= 1981 NFL draft =

National Football League draft

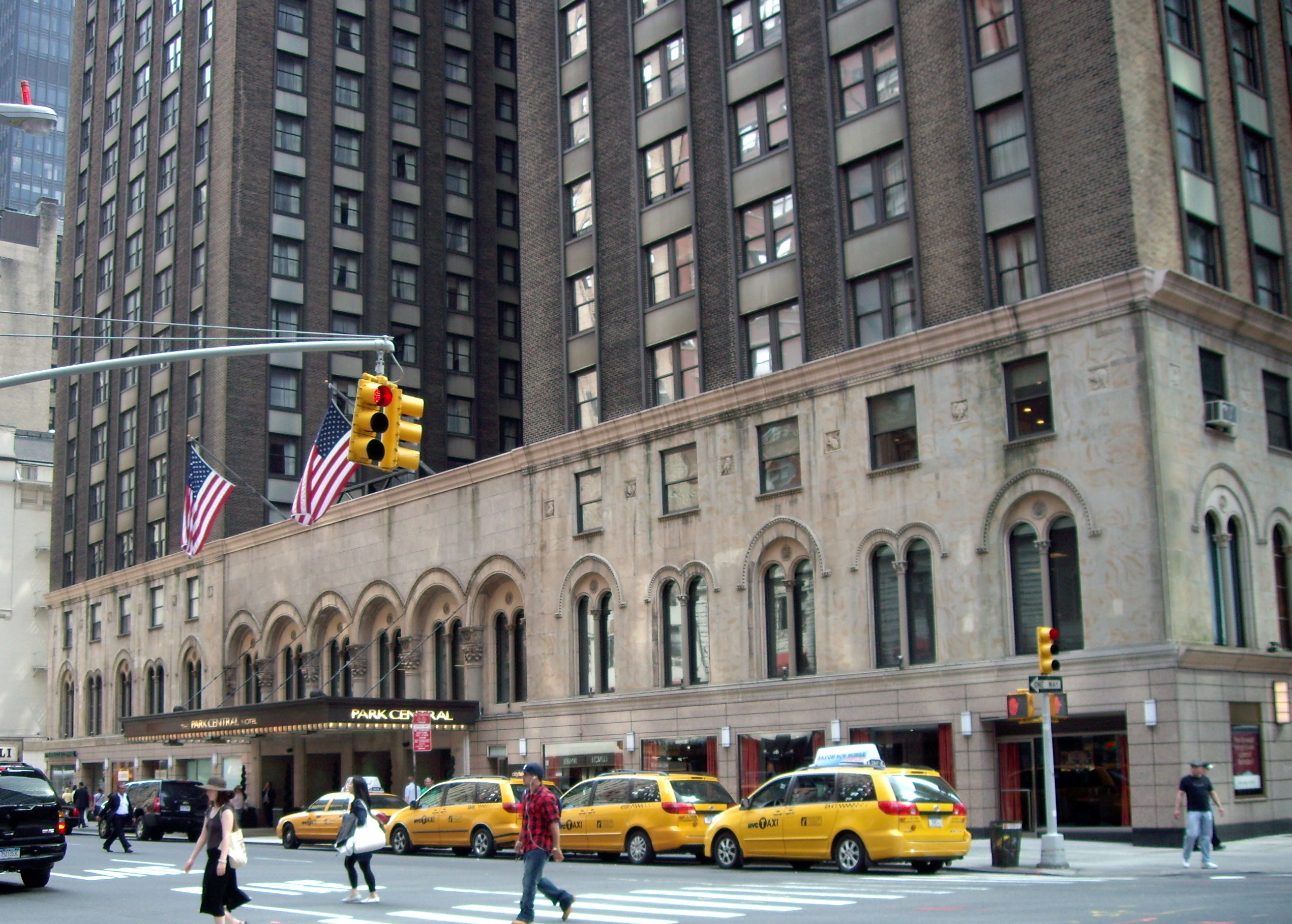
- The former Sheraton Hotel (draft venue), photographed in 2010

General information
- Date: April 28–29, 1981
- Location: New York Sheraton Hotel in New York City
- Network: ESPN

Overview
- 332 total selections in 12 rounds
- League: NFL
- First selection: George Rogers, RB; New Orleans Saints
- Mr. Irrelevant: Phil Nelson, TE; Oakland Raiders
- Most selections (17): New Orleans Saints
- Fewest selections (8): Tampa Bay Buccaneers
- Hall of Famers: 8: LB Lawrence Taylor; S Kenny Easley; CB Ronnie Lott; LB Mike Singletary; DE Howie Long; LB Rickey Jackson; G Russ Grimm; LB Sam Mills

The 1981 NFL draft was the procedure by which National Football League teams selected amateur college football players. It is officially known as the NFL Annual Player Selection Meeting. The draft was held during April 28–29, 1981, at the New York Sheraton Hotel in New York City. The league also held a supplemental draft after the regular draft and before the regular season.

For the first time, the top two picks of the draft, running back George Rogers selected by the New Orleans Saints and linebacker Lawrence Taylor picked by the New York Giants, were named Offensive and Defensive Rookies of the Year, respectively.

== Player selections ==
*	= compensatory selection
†	= Pro Bowler
‡	= Hall of Famer

Positions key
Offense	Defense	Special teams
QB — Quarterback; RB — Running back; FB — Fullback; WR — Wide receiver; TE — Tight end; OL — Offensive lineman; T — Tackle; G — Guard; C — Center	DL — Defensive lineman; DT — Defensive tackle (Note: Includes nose tackle (NT)); DE — Defensive end; EDGE — Edge rusher; LB — Linebacker (Note: Includes middle linebacker (MLB/MIKE), weakside linebacker (WILL), strongside linebacker (SAM), off-ball linebacker, and outside linebacker (OLB)); DB — Defensive back; CB — Cornerback; S — Safety (Note: Includes free safety (FS) and strong safety (SS))	K — Kicker (Note: Also known as a placekicker (PK)); P — Punter; LS — Long snapper; RS — Return specialist (Note: Includes kickoff and punt returners)

Rnd.	Pick	Team	Player	Pos.	College	Notes
1	1	New Orleans Saints	George Rogers ^{†}	RB	South Carolina	Heisman Trophy winner
1	2	New York Giants	Lawrence Taylor^{‡}^{†}	LB	North Carolina	
1	3	New York Jets	Freeman McNeil ^{†}	RB	UCLA	
1	4	Seattle Seahawks	Kenny Easley^{‡}^{†}	SS	UCLA	
1	5	St. Louis Cardinals	E. J. Junior ^{†}	LB	Alabama	
1	6	Green Bay Packers	Rich Campbell	QB	California	
1	7	Tampa Bay Buccaneers	Hugh Green ^{†}	LB	Pittsburgh	
1	8	San Francisco 49ers	Ronnie Lott^{‡}^{†}	CB	USC	
1	9	Los Angeles Rams	Mel Owens	LB	Michigan	from Washington
1	10	Cincinnati Bengals	David Verser	WR	Kansas	
1	11	Chicago Bears	Keith Van Horne	T	USC	
1	12	Baltimore Colts	Randy McMillan	RB	Pittsburgh	
1	13	Miami Dolphins	David Overstreet	RB	Oklahoma	
1	14	Kansas City Chiefs	Willie Scott	TE	South Carolina	
1	15	Denver Broncos	Dennis Smith ^{†}	S	USC	
1	16	Detroit Lions	Mark Nichols	WR	San Jose State	
1	17	Pittsburgh Steelers	Keith Gary	DE	Oklahoma	
1	18	Baltimore Colts	Donnell Thompson	DT	North Carolina	from Minnesota
1	19	New England Patriots	Brian Holloway ^{†}	T	Stanford	
1	20	Washington Redskins	Mark May ^{†}	T	Pittsburgh	from Los Angeles
1	21	Oakland Raiders	Ted Watts	CB	Texas Tech	from Houston
1	22	Cleveland Browns	Hanford Dixon ^{†}	CB	Southern Miss	
1	23	Oakland Raiders	Curt Marsh	T	Washington	from Buffalo
1	24	San Diego Chargers	James Brooks ^{†}	RB	Auburn	
1	25	Atlanta Falcons	Bobby Butler	CB	Florida State	
1	26	Dallas Cowboys	Howard Richards	T	Missouri	
1	27	Philadelphia Eagles	Leonard Mitchell	DE	Houston	
1	28	Buffalo Bills	Booker Moore	RB	Penn State	from Oakland
2	29	New Orleans Saints	Russell Gary	SS	Nebraska	
2	30	New York Jets	Marion Barber Jr.	RB	Minnesota	
2	31	Seattle Seahawks	David Hughes	RB	Boise State	
2	32	New York Giants	Dave Young	TE	Purdue	
2	33	St. Louis Cardinals	Neil Lomax ^{†}	QB	Portland State	
2	34	Tampa Bay Buccaneers	James Wilder Sr. ^{†}	RB	Missouri	
2	35	Green Bay Packers	Gary Lewis	TE	Texas–Arlington	
2	36	San Francisco 49ers	John Harty	DT	Iowa	from Washington
2	37	Cincinnati Bengals	Cris Collinsworth ^{†}	WR	Florida	
2	38	Chicago Bears	Mike Singletary^{‡}^{†}	LB	Baylor	from San Francisco
2	39	Minnesota Vikings	Mardye McDole	WR	Mississippi State	from Baltimore
2	40	San Francisco 49ers	Eric Wright ^{†}	CB	Missouri	from Chicago
2	41	Kansas City Chiefs	Joe Delaney ^{†}	RB	Northwestern State	
2	42	Denver Broncos	Clay Brown	TE	BYU	
2	43	Los Angeles Rams	Jim Collins ^{†}	LB	Syracuse	from Miami
2	44	Pittsburgh Steelers	Anthony Washington	CB	Fresno State	
2	45	Minnesota Vikings	Robin Sendlein	LB	Texas	
2	46	Detroit Lions	Curtis Green	DE	Alabama State	
2	47	New England Patriots	Tony Collins ^{†}	RB	East Carolina	
2	48	Oakland Raiders	Howie Long^{‡}^{†}	DT	Villanova	from Houston
2	49	Buffalo Bills	Chris Williams	CB	LSU	from Cleveland
2	50	Buffalo Bills	Byron Franklin	WR	Auburn	
2	51	New Orleans Saints	Rickey Jackson^{‡}^{†}	LB	Pittsburgh	from San Diego
2	52	Minnesota Vikings	Jarvis Redwine	RB	Nebraska	from Los Angeles via Washington and Baltimore
2	53	Dallas Cowboys	Doug Donley	WR	Ohio State	
2	54	Atlanta Falcons	Lyman White	LB	LSU	
2	55	Philadelphia Eagles	Dean Miraldi	G	Utah	
2	56	Miami Dolphins	Andra Franklin ^{†}	RB	Nebraska	from Oakland vis Los Angeles
3	57	New Orleans Saints	Frank Warren	DE	Auburn	
3	58	Seattle Seahawks	Bill Dugan	G	Penn State	
3	59	New York Giants	John Mistler	WR	Arizona State	
3	60	New York Jets	Ben Rudolph	DT	Long Beach State	
3	61	St. Louis Cardinals	Jeff Griffin	CB	Utah	
3	62	Green Bay Packers	Ray Stachowicz	P	Michigan State	
3	63	Los Angeles Rams	Greg Meisner	DT	Pittsburgh	from Tampa Bay
3	64	Cincinnati Bengals	John Simmons	CB	SMU	
3	65	San Francisco 49ers	Carlton Williamson ^{†}	S	Pittsburgh	
3	66	Los Angeles Rams	Robert Cobb	DE	Arizona	from Washington
3	67	Chicago Bears	Ken Margerum	WR	Stanford	
3	68	Baltimore Colts	Randy Van Divier	T	Washington	
3	69	Washington Redskins	Russ Grimm^{‡}^{†}	G	Pittsburgh	from Miami via Los Angeles
3	70	Kansas City Chiefs	Marvin Harvey	TE	Southern Miss	
3	71	New Orleans Saints	Hoby Brenner ^{†}	TE	USC	from Minnesota
3	72	Detroit Lions	Don Greco	G	Western Illinois	
3	73	Pittsburgh Steelers	Rick Donnalley	C	North Carolina	
3	74	Minnesota Vikings	Tim Irwin	T	Tennessee	from New England
3	75	Kansas City Chiefs	Roger Taylor	T	Oklahoma	from Cleveland via Denver
3	76	Buffalo Bills	Mike Mosley	WR	Texas A&M	
3	77	San Diego Chargers	Irvin Phillips	CB	Arkansas Tech	
3	78	Kansas City Chiefs	Lloyd Burruss ^{†}	S	Maryland	from Los Angeles
3	79	Houston Oilers	Michael Holston	WR	Morgan State	
3	80	Atlanta Falcons	Scott Woerner	S	Georgia	
3	81	Dallas Cowboys	Glen Titensor	DE	BYU	
3	82	Philadelphia Eagles	Greg LaFleur	TE	LSU	
3	83	Buffalo Bills	Robert Geathers	DT	South Carolina State	from Oakland
4	84	Miami Dolphins	Sammy Greene	WR	UNLV	from New Orleans
4	85	New York Giants	Clifford Chatman	FB	Central State (OK)	
4	86	New York Jets	Al Washington	LB	Ohio State	
4	87	Seattle Seahawks	Scott Phillips	WR	BYU	
4	88	St. Louis Cardinals	Steve Rhodes	WR	Oklahoma	
4	89	Tampa Bay Buccaneers	John Holt	CB	West Texas State	
4	90	Washington Redskins	Tom Flick	QB	Washington	from Green Bay
4	91	Dallas Cowboys	Scott Pelluer	LB	Washington State	from San Francisco
4	92	Cleveland Browns	Mike Robinson	DE	Arizona	from Washington
4	93	Cincinnati Bengals	Guy Frazier	LB	Wyoming	
4	94	Baltimore Colts	Tim Sherwin	TE	Boston College	
4	95	Chicago Bears	Todd Bell ^{†}	S	Ohio State	
4	96	Miami Dolphins	Brad Wright	QB	New Mexico	
4	97	Kansas City Chiefs	Ron Washington	WR	Arizona State	
4	98	Denver Broncos	Mark Herrmann	QB	Purdue	
4	99	Detroit Lions	Tracy Porter	WR	LSU	
4	100	Pittsburgh Steelers	Robbie Martin	WR	Cal Poly	
4	101	Minnesota Vikings	John Swain	CB	Miami (FL)	
4	102	New England Patriots	Don Blackmon	LB	Tulsa	
4	103	San Diego Chargers	Amos Lawrence	RB	North Carolina	
4	104	Los Angeles Rams	George Lilja	C	Michigan	
4	105	Green Bay Packers	Richard Turner	DT	Oklahoma	
4	106	Houston Oilers	Nick Eyre	T	BYU	
4	107	San Diego Chargers	Eric Sievers	TE	Maryland	
4	108	Dallas Cowboys	Derrie Nelson	LB	Nebraska	
4	109	Atlanta Falcons	John Scully	C	Notre Dame	
4	110	Philadelphia Eagles	Calvin Murray	RB	Ohio State	
4	111	Oakland Raiders	Johnny Robinson	DT	Louisiana Tech University	
5	112	New Orleans Saints	Louis Oubre	T	Oklahoma	
5	113	New York Jets	Tyrone Keys	DE	Mississippi State	
5	114	Seattle Seahawks	Edwin Bailey	G	South Carolina State	
5	115	New York Giants	Bill Neill	DT	Pittsburgh	
5	116	St. Louis Cardinals	John Gillen	LB	Illinois	
5	117	Green Bay Packers	Byron Braggs	DT	Alabama	
5	118	Oakland Raiders	James Davis	CB	Southern	from Tampa Bay
5	119	Washington Redskins	Dexter Manley ^{†}	DE	Oklahoma State	
5	120	Cincinnati Bengals	Benjie Pryor	TE	Pittsburgh	
5	121	San Francisco 49ers	Lynn Thomas	DB	Pittsburgh	
5	122	San Francisco 49ers	Arrington Jones	RB	Winston-Salem State	from Chicago
5	123	Minnesota Vikings	Wendell Ray	DE	Missouri	from Baltimore
5	124	Kansas City Chiefs	Todd Thomas	LS	North Dakota	
5	125	Denver Broncos	Ken Lanier	T	Florida State	
5	126	Miami Dolphins	Ken Poole	DE	Northeast Louisiana	
5	127	Pittsburgh Steelers	Ricky Martin	WR	New Mexico	
5	128	New Orleans Saints	Jerry Boyarsky	DT	Pittsburgh	from Minnesota
5	129	Detroit Lions	Larry Lee	G	UCLA	
5	130	New England Patriots	Steve Clark	DT	Kansas State	
5	131	San Diego Chargers	Keith Ferguson	LB	Ohio State	
5	132	Washington Redskins	Gary Sayre	G	Cameron	from L. A. Rams
5	133	Houston Oilers	Delbert Fowler	LB	West Virginia	
5	134	Cleveland Browns	Steve Cox	P/K	Arkansas	
5	135	Buffalo Bills	Calvin Clark	DE	Purdue	
5	136	Atlanta Falcons	Eric Sanders	T	Nevada	
5	137	Dallas Cowboys	Danny Spradlin	LB	Tennessee	
5	138	Miami Dolphins	Tommy Vigorito	RB	Virginia	from Philadelphia
6	139	New Orleans Saints	Nat Hudson	G	Georgia	
6	140	Seattle Seahawks	Steve Durham	DE	Clemson	
6	141	San Diego Chargers	Andy Gissinger	T	Syracuse	from N. Y. Giants
6	142	New York Jets	John Woodring	LB	Brown	
6	143	St. Louis Cardinals	Dave Ahrens	LB	Wisconsin	
6	144	New Orleans Saints	Johnnie Poe	CB	Missouri	from Tampa Bay
6	145	New York Giants	Mel Hoover	WR	Arizona State	from Green Bay
6	146	Cincinnati Bengals	Rex Robinson	K	Georgia	
6	147	San Francisco 49ers	Pete Kugler	DT	Penn State	
6	148	Washington Redskins	Larry Kubin	LB	Penn State	
6	149	Baltimore Colts	Bubba Green	DT	NC State	
6	150	Chicago Bears	Reuben Henderson	CB	San Diego State	
6	151	Denver Broncos	Alvin Lewis	RB	Colorado State	
6	152	Miami Dolphins	Mack Moore	DE	Texas A&M	
6	153	Kansas City Chiefs	Dock Luckie	DT	Florida	
6	154	Miami Dolphins	Fulton Walker	CB	West Virginia	from Minnesota
6	155	Detroit Lions	Sam Johnson	DB	Maryland	
6	156	Pittsburgh Steelers	Bryan Hinkle	LB	Oregon	
6	157	New England Patriots	Ron Wooten	G	North Carolina	
6	158	Los Angeles Rams	William Daniels	DT	Alabama State	
6	159	Houston Oilers	Bill Kay	CB	Purdue	
6	160	Cleveland Browns	Ron Simmons	DT	Florida State	
6	161	Buffalo Bills	Robert Holt	WR	Baylor	
6	162	San Diego Chargers	Bobby Duckworth	WR	Arkansas	
6	163	Dallas Cowboys	Vince Skillings	DB	Ohio State	
6	164	Atlanta Falcons	Harry Stanback	DT	North Carolina	
6	165	New York Giants	Edward O'Neal	RB	Tuskegee	
6	166	New Orleans Saints	Glen Redd	LB	BYU	from Oakland
7	167	New Orleans Saints	Kevin Williams	WR	USC	
7	168	New York Giants	Louis Jackson	RB	Cal Poly	
7	169	New York Jets	Kenny Neal	DE	Iowa State	
7	170	Seattle Seahawks	Ron Johnson	WR	Long Beach State	
7	171	St. Louis Cardinals	Kevin Donnalley	S	North Dakota State	
7	172	Green Bay Packers	Bill Whitaker	CB	Missouri	
7	173	Dallas Cowboys	Ron Fellows	CB	Missouri	from Tampa Bay
7	174	Philadelphia Eagles	Alan Duncan	K	Tennessee	from San Francisco
7	175	Los Angeles Rams	Ron Battle	TE	North Texas State	from Washington
7	176	Cincinnati Bengals	Jeff Schuh	LB	Minnesota	
7	177	Chicago Bears	Jeff Fisher	CB	USC	
7	178	Baltimore Colts	Obed Ariri	K	Clemson	
7	179	Miami Dolphins	Mike Daum	T	Cal Poly	
7	180	Kansas City Chiefs	Billy Jackson	RB	Alabama	
7	181	Denver Broncos	Steve Busick	LB	USC	
7	182	Detroit Lions	Lee Spivey	T	SMU	
7	183	Pittsburgh Steelers	David Little ^{†}	LB	Florida	
7	184	Minnesota Vikings	Don Shaver	RB	Kutztown (PA)	
7	185	New England Patriots	Ken Toler	WR	Ole Miss	
7	186	Seattle Seahawks	Brad Scovill	TE	Penn State	from Houston
7	187	Cleveland Browns	Eddie Johnson	LB	Louisville	
7	188	Buffalo Bills	Steve Doolittle	LB	Colorado	
7	189	San Diego Chargers	Pete Holohan	TE	Notre Dame	
7	190	Los Angeles Rams	Mike Clark	DE	Florida	
7	–	Atlanta Falcons	The Atlanta Falcons forfeited their 1981 seventh round pick after selecting Matthew Teague in the 1980 Supplemental draft			
7	191	Dallas Cowboys	Ken Miller	CB	Eastern Michigan	
7	192	Philadelphia Eagles	Doak Field	LB	Baylor	
7	193	Houston Oilers	Don Washington	DB	Texas A&I	from Oakland
8	194	New England Patriots	Ken Naber	K	Stanford	from New Orleans
8	195	New York Jets	Lloyd Jones	WR	BYU	
8	196	Seattle Seahawks	Eric Lane	RB	BYU	
8	197	New York Giants	John Powers	G	Michigan	
8	198	St. Louis Cardinals	Mike Fisher	WR	Baylor	
8	199	Tampa Bay Buccaneers	Denver Johnson	T	Tulsa	
8	200	Green Bay Packers	Larry Werts	LB	Jackson State	
8	201	Washington Redskins	Charlie Brown ^{†}	WR	South Carolina State	
8	202	Cincinnati Bengals	Bobby Kemp	S	Cal State Fullerton	
8	203	San Francisco 49ers	Garry White	RB	Minnesota	
8	204	Baltimore Colts	Ken Sitton	DB	Oklahoma	
8	205	Chicago Bears	Scott Zettek	DT	Notre Dame	
8	206	Kansas City Chiefs	David Dorn	WR	Rutgers	
8	207	New York Giants	Mark Reed	QB	Minnesota State–Moorhead	from Denver
8	208	Miami Dolphins	William Judson	CB	South Carolina State	
8	209	Pittsburgh Steelers	Frank Wilson	RB	Rice	
8	210	Minnesota Vikings	Wade Wilson ^{†}	QB	East Texas State	
8	211	Detroit Lions	Bob Niziolek	TE	Colorado	
8	212	New England Patriots	Lin Dawson	TE	NC State	
8	213	New York Jets	J. C. Watts	QB	Oklahoma	from Cleveland
8	214	New Orleans Saints	Gene Gladys	LB	Penn State	from Buffalo
8	215	New Orleans Saints	Kevin Evans	DB	Arkansas	from San Diego
8	216	Los Angeles Rams	Art Plunkett	T	UNLV	
8	217	Houston Oilers	Willie Tullis	WR	Troy State	
8	218	Dallas Cowboys	Paul Piurowski	LB	Florida State	
8	219	Atlanta Falcons	Cliff Toney	DB	Auburn	
8	220	Baltimore Colts	Hosea Taylor	DT	Houston	from Philadelphia
8	221	New York Giants	Billy Ard	G	Wake Forest	from Oakland
9	222	New Orleans Saints	Toussaint Tyler	RB	Washington	
9	223	Seattle Seahawks	Jim Stone	RB	Notre Dame	
9	224	New York Giants	Byron Hunt	LB	SMU	
9	225	New York Jets	Admiral Dewey Larry	DB	UNLV	
9	226	St. Louis Cardinals	Stump Mitchell	RB	The Citadel	
9	227	Green Bay Packers	Tim Huffman	T	Notre Dame	
9	228	Tampa Bay Buccaneers	Mike Ford	QB	SMU	
9	229	Cincinnati Bengals	Jim Hannula	T	Northern Illinois	
9	230	Cincinnati Bengals	Samoa Samoa	RB	Washington State	from San Francisco
9	231	Washington Redskins	Darryl Grant	G	Rice	
9	232	Chicago Bears	Frank Ditta	G	Baylor	
9	233	Baltimore Colts	Tim Gooch	DT	Kentucky	
9	234	Denver Broncos	Rusty Olsen	DE	Washington	
9	235	Miami Dolphins	John Noonan	WR	Nebraska	
9	236	Seattle Seahawks	Jim Whatley	WR	Washington State	from Minnesota
9	237	Kansas City Chiefs	Tony Vereen	DB	Southeastern Louisiana	
9	238	Detroit Lions	Hugh Jernigan	DB	Arkansas	
9	239	Pittsburgh Steelers	James Hunter	T	USC	
9	240	Detroit Lions	Dave Martin	CB	Villanova	from New England
9	241	Buffalo Bills	Robb Riddick	RB	Millersville (PA)	
9	–	San Diego Chargers	The San Diego Chargers forfeited their 1981 ninth round pick after selecting Billy Mullins in the 1980 Supplemental draft			
9	242	Los Angeles Rams	Ron Seawell	LB	Portland State	
9	243	Houston Oilers	Avon Riley	LB	UCLA	
9	244	Cleveland Browns	Randy Schleusener	G	Nebraska	
9	245	Atlanta Falcons	Calvin Fance	RB	Rice	
9	246	Dallas Cowboys	Mike Wilson	WR	Washington State	
9	247	Philadelphia Eagles	Chuck Commiskey	C	Ole Miss	
9	248	Oakland Raiders	Curt Mohl	T	UCLA	
10	249	New Orleans Saints	Hokie Gajan	RB	LSU	
10	250	New York Giants	Mike Barber	DT	Grambling State	
10	251	New York Jets	Marty Wetzel	LB	Tulane	
10	252	Seattle Seahawks	Ken Dawson	RB	Savannah State	
10	253	St. Louis Cardinals	James Mallard	WR	Alabama	
10	254	Tampa Bay Buccaneers	Ken McCune	DE	Texas	
10	255	Green Bay Packers	Nickie Hall	QB	Tulane	
10	256	Baltimore Colts	Gregg Gerken	LB	Northern Arizona	
10	257	Washington Redskins	Phil Kessel	QB	Northern Michigan	
10	258	Cincinnati Bengals	Hubert Simpson	RB	Tennessee	
10	259	Baltimore Colts	Trent Bryant	DB	Arkansas	from San Francisco
10	260	Chicago Bears	Tim Clifford	QB	Indiana	
10	261	Miami Dolphins	Steve Folsom	TE	Utah	
10	262	Kansas City Chiefs	Les Studdard	G	Texas	
10	263	St. Louis Cardinals	Jim Joiner	WR	Miami (FL)	
10	264	Detroit Lions	Andy Cannavino	LB	Michigan	
10	265	Pittsburgh Steelers	Mike Mayock	S	Boston College	
10	266	Minnesota Vikings	James Murphy	WR	Utah State	
10	267	Washington Redskins	Allan Kennedy	T	Washington State	
10	268	San Diego Chargers	Robert Parham	RB	Grambling	
10	269	Los Angeles Rams	Robert Alexander	RB	West Virginia	
10	270	Houston Oilers	Larry Jones	RB	Colorado State	
10	271	Cleveland Browns	Dean Prater	DE	Oklahoma State	
10	272	Buffalo Bills	Justin Cross	T	Western State (CO)	
10	273	Dallas Cowboys	Pat Graham	DT	California	
10	274	Atlanta Falcons	Robert Murphy	DB	Ohio State	
10	275	Philadelphia Eagles	Hubie Oliver	RB	Arizona	
10	276	Oakland Raiders	Frank Hawkins	RB	Nevada	
11	277	New Orleans Saints	Lester Mickens	WR	Kansas	
11	278	New York Jets	Ed Gall	DT	Maryland	
11	279	Seattle Seahawks	Lance Olander	RB	Colorado	
11	280	San Diego Chargers	Matt Petrzelka	T	Iowa	
11	281	St. Louis Cardinals	Mike Sherrod	TE	Illinois	
11	282	Green Bay Packers	Forrest Valora	LB	Oklahoma	
11	283	Tampa Bay Buccaneers	Johnny Ray Smith	DB	Lamar	
11	284	Washington Redskins	Jerry Hill	WR	North Alabama	
11	285	Cincinnati Bengals	Robert Jackson	DB	Central Michigan	
11	286	San Francisco 49ers	Rob DeBose	TE	UCLA	
11	287	Chicago Bears	Lonnie Johnson	RB	Indiana	
11	288	Baltimore Colts	Holden Smith	WR	California	
11	289	Kansas City Chiefs	Frank Case	DE	Penn State	
11	290	Denver Broncos	Pat Walker	WR	Miami (FL)	
11	291	Miami Dolphins	Jim Jensen	QB	Boston University	
11	292	Pittsburgh Steelers	Rick Trocano	QB	Pittsburgh	
11	293	Minnesota Vikings	Brent Knourek	FB	Oregon State	
11	294	Detroit Lions	Willie Jackson	DB	Mississippi State	
11	295	New England Patriots	Brian Buckley	QB	Harvard	
11	296	Los Angeles Rams	Marcellus Greene	DB	Arizona	
11	297	Houston Oilers	Claude Matthews	G	Auburn	
11	298	Cleveland Browns	Larry Friday	DB	Mississippi State	
11	299	Buffalo Bills	Buster Barnett	TE	Jackson State	
11	300	San Diego Chargers	Carlos Bradley	LB	Wake Forest	
11	301	Atlanta Falcons	Keith Chappelle	WR	Iowa	
11	302	Dallas Cowboys	Tim Morrison	G	Georgia	
11	303	Philadelphia Eagles	Gail Davis	DT	Virginia Union	
11	304	Oakland Raiders	Chester Willis	RB	Auburn	
12	305	New Orleans Saints	Jim Wilks	DT	San Diego State	
12	306	Seattle Seahawks	Jeff Bednarek	DT	Pacific	
12	307	New York Giants	Mike Maher	TE	Western Illinois	
12	308	New York Jets	Mike Moeller	T	Drake	
12	309	St. Louis Cardinals	Joe Adams	G	Nebraska	
12	310	Tampa Bay Buccaneers	Brad White	DT	Tennessee	
12	311	Green Bay Packers	Cliff Lewis	LB	Southern Miss	
12	312	Cincinnati Bengals	Mark O'Connell	QB	Ball State	
12	313	San Francisco 49ers	Major Ogilvie	RB	Alabama	
12	314	Washington Redskins	Clint Didier	TE	Portland State	
12	315	Baltimore Colts	Eric Scoggins	LB	USC	
12	316	Chicago Bears	Bob Shupryt	LB	New Mexico	
12	317	Denver Broncos	John Hankerd	LB	Notre Dame	
12	318	Miami Dolphins	John Alford	DT	South Carolina State	
12	319	Kansas City Chiefs	Bob Gagliano	QB	Utah State	
12	320	Minnesota Vikings	Brian Williams	TE	Southern	
12	321	Denver Broncos	Mandel Robinson	RB	Wyoming	
12	322	San Francisco 49ers	Joe Adams	QB	Tennessee State	from Pittsburgh
12	323	New England Patriots	Cris Crissy	DB	Princeton	
12	324	Houston Oilers	Bill Capece	K	Florida State	
12	325	Cleveland Browns	Kevin McGill	T	Oregon	
12	326	Buffalo Bills	Keith Clark	LB	Memphis State	
12	327	San Diego Chargers	Stacy Charles	WR	Bethune–Cookman	
12	328	Los Angeles Rams	Jairo Penaranda	RB	UCLA	
12	329	Dallas Cowboys	Nate Lundy	WR	Indiana	
12	330	Atlanta Falcons	Mark McCants	DT	Temple	
12	331	Philadelphia Eagles	Ray Ellis	DB	Ohio State	
12	332	Oakland Raiders	Phil Nelson	TE	Delaware	

== Supplemental draft ==
Rnd.	Pick	Team	Player	Pos.	College	Notes
1		New Orleans Saints	Dave Wilson	QB	Illinois	
11		New England Patriots	Chy Davidson	WR	Rhode Island	

== Hall of Famers ==
- Mike Singletary, linebacker from Baylor, taken 2nd round 38th overall by the Chicago Bears

Inducted: Professional Football Hall of Fame class of 1998.

- Lawrence Taylor, linebacker from North Carolina, taken 1st round 2nd overall by the New York Giants

Inducted: Professional Football Hall of Fame class of 1999.

- Ronnie Lott, cornerback from Southern California, taken 1st round 8th overall by the San Francisco 49ers

Inducted: Professional Football Hall of Fame class of 2000.

- Howie Long, defensive tackle from Villanova, taken 2nd round 48th overall by the Oakland Raiders

Inducted: Professional Football Hall of Fame class of 2000.

- Rickey Jackson, linebacker from Pittsburgh, taken 2nd round 51st overall by the New Orleans Saints

Inducted: Professional Football Hall of Fame class of 2010.

- Russ Grimm, offensive guard from Pittsburgh, taken 3rd round 69th overall by the Washington Redskins

Inducted: Professional Football Hall of Fame class of 2010.

- Kenny Easley, safety from UCLA, taken 1st round 4th overall by the Seattle Seahawks

Inducted: Professional Football Hall of Fame class of 2017.

- Sam Mills, linebacker from Montclair State, signed undrafted by the Cleveland Browns

Inducted: Professional Football Hall of Fame class of 2022 (posthumous).

== Notable undrafted players ==
†	= Pro Bowler	= Hall of Famer

Original NFL team	Player	Pos.	College	Notes
Atlanta Falcons	Jeff Brockhaus	K	Missouri	
Atlanta Falcons	Blane Gaison	S	Hawaii	
Atlanta Falcons	Floyd Hodge	WR	Utah	
Atlanta Falcons	Mick Luckhurst	K	California	
Atlanta Falcons	Stan Talley	P	TCU	
Baltimore Colts	Steve Parker	DE	Eastern Illinois	
Baltimore Colts	Dave Shula	WR	Dartmouth	
Buffalo Bills	Joe Bock	C	Virginia	
Buffalo Bills	Mike Humiston	LB	Weber State	
Buffalo Bills	Mark Roopenian	DT	Boston College	
Chicago Bears	Leslie Frazier	CB	Alcorn State	
Chicago Bears	Jay Hilgenberg ^{†}	C	Iowa	
Cleveland Browns	Bill Hill	CB	Rutgers	
Cleveland Browns	Sam Mills^{‡}^{†}	LB	Montclair State	
Dallas Cowboys	Michael Downs	S	Rice	
Dallas Cowboys	Joey Hackett	TE	Elon	
Dallas Cowboys	Angelo King	LB	South Carolina State	
Dallas Cowboys	Ron Spears	DE	San Diego State	
Dallas Cowboys	Everson Walls ^{†}	CB	Grambling State	
Dallas Cowboys	Steve Wright	T	Northern Iowa	
Denver Broncos	Steve Trimble	DB	Maryland	
Green Bay Packers	Rick Kehr	G	Carthage	
Green Bay Packers	Greg Knafelc	QB	Notre Dame	
Green Bay Packers	David Petway	S	Northern Illinois	
Green Bay Packers	Randy Scott	LB	Alabama	
Houston Oilers	Rich Karlis	K	Cincinnati	
Houston Oilers	Ralph Williams	T	Southern	
Kansas City Chiefs	Deron Cherry ^{†}	S	Rutgers	
Los Angeles Rams	Marcus Anderson	WR	Tulane	
Los Angeles Rams	Jeff Kemp	QB	Dartmouth	
Miami Dolphins	Rodell Thomas	LB	Alabama State	
New England Patriots	Rich Camarillo ^{†}	P	Washington	
New England Patriots	Tim Ross	LB	Bowling Green	
New England Patriots	John Tautolo	G	UCLA	
New Orleans Saints	Monte Bennett	DT	Kansas State	
New Orleans Saints	Victor Jackson	S	Bowie State	
New Orleans Saints	Steve Parker	DE	Eastern Illinois	
New Orleans Saints	Frank Wattelet	S	Kansas	
New York Giants	Leon Bright	RB	Florida State	
New York Giants	Jim Burt ^{†}	DT	Miami	
New York Jets	Joe Pellegrini	G	Harvard	
Oakland Raiders	Melvin Byrd	DB	UC Davis	
Oakland Raiders	Paul Davis	LB	North Carolina	
Philadelphia Eagles	Greg Brown	DT/DE	Kansas State	
Philadelphia Eagles	Frank Giddens	T	New Mexico	
Philadelphia Eagles	Lyndell Jones	CB	Hawaii	
Philadelphia Eagles	Buddy Moor	DE	Eastern Kentucky	
Philadelphia Eagles	Chuck Pitcock	G	Tulane	
Philadelphia Eagles	Jay Repko	TE	Ursinus	
Pittsburgh Steelers	David Trout	K	Pittsburgh	
San Diego Chargers	Rick Ackerman	DT	Memphis State	
San Francisco 49ers	Matt Bouza	WR	California	
San Francisco 49ers	Rick Gervais	S	Stanford	
San Francisco 49ers	Jim Looney	LB	Purdue	
San Francisco 49ers	Milt McColl	LB	Stanford	
Seattle Seahawks	Wilson Alvarez	K	Southeastern Louisiana	
Seattle Seahawks	Greg Gaines	LB	Tennessee	
Seattle Seahawks	Paul Johns	WR	Tulsa	
Seattle Seahawks	Gregg Johnson	CB/S	Oklahoma State	
Seattle Seahawks	Eugene Rowell	DT	Dubuque	
Seattle Seahawks	Harry Sydney	RB	Kansas	
Seattle Seahawks	Mike Tice	TE	Maryland	
Washington Redskins	Neil Elshire	DE	Oregon	
Washington Redskins	Mel Kaufman	LB	Cal Poly	
Washington Redskins	Joe Jacoby ^{†}	T	Louisville	
Washington Redskins	Dave Smigelsky	P	Virginia Tech	
Washington Redskins	Herb Spencer	LB	Newberry	
