= 1981 Cleveland Browns season =

NFL team season

- Owner: Art Modell
- Head coach: Sam Rutigliano
- Home stadium: Cleveland Municipal Stadium

Results
- Record: 5–11
- Division place: 4th AFC Central
- Playoffs: Did not qualify
- Pro Bowlers: TE Ozzie Newsome

The 1981 Cleveland Browns season was the team's 32nd season with the National Football League. In a highly disappointing season filled with a number of key injuries at different stretches during the campaign, the Browns finished the year with five straight losses for their longest losing streak since 1975 in a skid that saw them lose seven of their final eight games.

== Season summary ==
The Browns had a similar kind of season in 1981—eight of the games were decided by six points or less, and five were decided by three points or less. Sipe threw more interceptions (25) than TDs (17), his completion rate fell to just over 55 percent and his quarterback rating plummeted to 68.2. FB Mike Pruitt rushed for more than 1,000 yards (1,103) for the third straight year in 1981, and caught 63 passes for the second season in a row. Tight end Ozzie Newsome set a team record (since broken) for receptions with 69 and had the second-most receiving yards in Browns history at the time with 1,002.

HB Greg Pruitt established a personal best with 65 catches.

Ironically, through 2024 the 1981 Browns are the only team since the AFL-NFL merger in 1970 to have beaten both eventual Super Bowl participants, the Super Bowl champion San Francisco 49ers and the AFC Champion Cincinnati Bengals, while finishing with a losing record.

== Offseason ==
=== NFL draft ===
The following were selected in the 1981 NFL draft.

Round	Overall	Player	Position	School/Club team
1	22	Hanford Dixon	Defensive back	Southern Miss
4	92	Mike Robinson	Defensive end	Arizona
5	134	Steve Cox	Punter	Arkansas
6	160	Ron Simmons	Defensive tackle	Florida State
7	187	Eddie Johnson	Linebacker	Louisville
9	244	Randy Schleusener	Guard	Nebraska
10	271	Dean Prater	Defensive end	Oklahoma State
11	298	Larry Friday	Defensive back	Mississippi State
12	325	Kevin McGill	Offensive tackle	Oregon

== Personnel ==
=== Staff / Coaches ===
1981 Cleveland Browns staff
Front office: President and Owner – Art Modell; Assistant to the President – Peter Hadhazy; Head coaches: Head Coach – Sam Rutigliano; Offensive coaches: Quarterbacks – Paul Hackett; Running Backs – Jim Garrett; Receivers – Rich Kotite; Offensive Line – Rod Humenuik	Defensive coaches: Defensive Coordinator – Marty Schottenheimer; Defensive Line – Tom Pratt; Linebackers – Dave Adolph; Defensive Backs - Len Fontes; Special teams coaches: Special Teams – John Petercuskie; Strength and conditioning: Strength and Conditioning – Dave Redding; Director of Pro Personnel - Allan Webb; Film Coordinator - Ed Ulinski; Athletic Trainer - Leo Murphy

=== Roster ===
1981 Cleveland Browns roster
Quarterbacks (QB): 16 Paul McDonald; 17 Brian Sipe; 12 Rick Trocano; Running backs (RB): 24 Gary Davis; 26 Dino Hall; 35 Calvin Hill; 30 Cleo Miller; 34 Greg Pruitt; 43 Mike Pruitt; 25 Charles White; Wide receivers (WR): 83 Ricky Feacher; 86 Danny Fulton; 85 Dave Logan; 33 Reggie Rucker; Tight ends (TE): 82 Ozzie Newsome; 84 McDonald Oden	Offensive linemen (OL): 75 Ray Bloch T; 64 Joe DeLamielleure G; 73 Doug Dieken T; 68 Robert Jackson G; 71 Matt Miller T; 63 Cody Risien T; 65 Henry Sheppard G; 79 Gerry Sullivan C; Defensive linemen (DL): 77 Lyle Alzado DE; 91 Henry Bradley NT; 97 Thomas Brown DE; 94 Elvis Franks DE; 92 Mike Robinson DE; 72 Jerry Sherk NT	Linebackers (LB): 52 Dick Ambrose ILB; 50 Don Goode OLB; 58 Bruce Huther ILB; 56 Robert Jackson ILB; 51 Eddie Johnson ILB; 57 Clay Matthews OLB; Defensive backs (DB): 23 Autry Beamon FS; 28 Ron Bolton CB; 27 Thom Darden FS; 29 Hanford Dixon CB; 20 Judson Flint CB; 48 Lawrence Johnson CB; 22 Clarence Scott SS; Special teams (ST): 9 Matt Bahr K; 15 Steve Cox P; 10 Dave Jacobs K	Reserve: 80 Willis Adams WR (IR); 49 Clinton Burrell S (IR); 53 Bill Cowher LB (IR); 54 Tom DeLeone C (IR); 41 Larry Friday S (IR); 90 Marshall Harris DE (IR); 70 Kevin McGill T (IR); 69 Joel Patten T (IR); 55 Curtis Weathers LB (IR); Rookies in italics

== Regular season ==
=== Schedule ===
Week	Date	Opponent	Result	Record	Venue	Attendance	Recap
1	September 7	San Diego Chargers	**L** 14–44	0–1	Cleveland Municipal Stadium	78,904	Recap
2	September 13	**Houston Oilers**	**L** 3–9	0–2	Cleveland Municipal Stadium	79,483	Recap
3	September 20	at **Cincinnati Bengals**	**W** 20–17	1–2	Riverfront Stadium	52,170	Recap
4	September 27	Atlanta Falcons	**W** 28–17	2–2	Cleveland Municipal Stadium	78,283	Recap
5	October 4	at Los Angeles Rams	**L** 16–27	2–3	Anaheim Stadium	63,924	Recap
6	October 11	at **Pittsburgh Steelers**	**L** 7–13	2–4	Three Rivers Stadium	53,255	Recap
7	October 18	New Orleans Saints	**W** 20–17	3–4	Cleveland Municipal Stadium	76,059	Recap
8	October 25	Baltimore Colts	**W** 42–28	4–4	Cleveland Municipal Stadium	78,986	Recap
9	November 1	at Buffalo Bills	**L** 13–22	4–5	Rich Stadium	78,266	Recap
10	November 8	at Denver Broncos	**L** 20–23 (OT)	4–6	Mile High Stadium	74,859	Recap
11	November 15	at San Francisco 49ers	**W** 15–12	5–6	Candlestick Park	52,455	Recap
12	November 22	**Pittsburgh Steelers**	**L** 10–32	5–7	Cleveland Municipal Stadium	77,958	Recap
13	November 29	**Cincinnati Bengals**	**L** 21–41	5–8	Cleveland Municipal Stadium	75,186	Recap
14	December 3	at **Houston Oilers**	**L** 13–17	5–9	Houston Astrodome	44,502	Recap
15	December 12	New York Jets	**L** 13–14	5–10	Cleveland Municipal Stadium	56,866	Recap
16	December 20	at Seattle Seahawks	**L** 21–42	5–11	Kingdome	51,435	Recap
Note: Intra-division opponents are in **bold** text.

=== Standings ===
AFC Central
	W	L	T	PCT	DIV	CONF	PF	PA	STK
^{(1)} Cincinnati Bengals	12	4	0	.750	4–2	10–2	421	304	W2
Pittsburgh Steelers	8	8	0	.500	3–3	5–7	356	297	L3
Houston Oilers	7	9	0	.438	4–2	6–6	281	355	W1
Cleveland Browns	5	11	0	.313	1–5	2–10	276	375	L5

== Game summaries ==
=== Week 4: vs. Atlanta ===
Week 4: Atlanta Falcons at Cleveland Browns – Game summary

Quarter	1	2	3	4	Total
Falcons	3	7	0	7	17
Browns	0	21	7	0	28

at Cleveland Municipal Stadium, Cleveland, Ohio

- Date: September 27
- Game time: 1:00 p.m. EDT
- Game weather: 70 °F (21 °C), relative humidity 56%, round (wind) 17 mph (27 km/h)
- Game attendance: 78,283
- Referee: Jerry Markbreit
- TV announcers (CBS): Vin Scully (play–by–play) and John Madden (color commentator)

Game information

First quarter

- ATL – Luckhurst 35 yard field goal
  Falcons 3, Browns 0

Second quarter

- ATL – Jenkins 18 yard pass from Bartkowski (Luckhurst kick)
  Falcons 10, Browns 0
- CLE – Pruitt 13 yard pass from Sipe (Jacobs kick)
  Browns 14, Falcons 10
- CLE – Newsome 23 yard pass from Sipe (Jacobs kick)
  Browns 21, Falcons 10
- CLE – Sipe 1 yard rush (Jacobs kick)
  Browns 21, Falcons 10

Third quarter

- CLE – Pruitt 1 yard rush (Jacobs kick)
  Browns 28, Falcons 10

Fourth quarter

- ATL – Jenkins 5 yard pass from Bartkowski (Luckhurst kick)
  Browns 28, Falcons 17

Top passers

- ATL – Steve Bartkowski 12/30, 176 yds, 2 TD, 2 INT
- CLE – Brian Sipe 21/34, 215 yds, 2 TD, 2 INT

Top rushers

- ATL – William Andrews 16 carr, 97 yds
- CLE – Mike Pruitt, 20 carr, 99 yds, 1 TD

Top receivers

- ATL – Alfred Jenkins 6 rec, 136 yds, 2 TD
- CLE – Ozzie Newsome 6 rec, 78 yds, 1 TD

Turnovers

- ATL – 4
- CLE – 5
