= 1980 Florida State Seminoles football team =

American college football season

1980 Florida State Seminoles football

Co-national champion (FACT)

Orange Bowl, L 17–18 vs. Oklahoma
- Conference: Independent

Ranking
- Coaches: No. 5
- AP: No. 5
- Record: 10–2
- Head coach: Bobby Bowden (5th season)
- Offensive coordinator: George Henshaw (2nd season)
- Offensive scheme: Pro-style
- Defensive coordinator: Jack Stanton (5th season)
- Base defense: 4–3
- Captains: Reggie Herring; Greg Futch; Ron Simmons; Ken Lanier
- Home stadium: Doak Campbell Stadium

1980 NCAA Division I-A independents football records
	Conf.					Overall
Team	W		L		T	W		L		T
No. 2 Pittsburgh		–		–		11	–	1	–	0
Tennessee State		–		–		9	–	1	–	0
No. 5 Florida State		–		–		10	–	2	–	0
No. 8 Penn State		–		–		10	–	2	–	0
No. 9 Notre Dame		–		–		9	–	2	–	1
No. 18 Miami (FL)		–		–		9	–	3	–	0
Southern Miss		–		–		9	–	3	–	0
Navy		–		–		8	–	4	–	0
South Carolina		–		–		8	–	4	–	0
Virginia Tech		–		–		8	–	4	–	0
Boston College		–		–		7	–	4	–	0
Northeast Louisiana		–		–		7	–	4	–	0
Rutgers		–		–		7	–	4	–	0
UNLV		–		–		7	–	4	–	0
Tulane		–		–		7	–	5	–	0
Colgate		–		–		5	–	4	–	1
North Texas State		–		–		6	–	5	–	0
Villanova		–		–		6	–	5	–	0
West Virginia		–		–		6	–	6	–	0
Louisville		–		–		5	–	6	–	0
Richmond		–		–		5	–	6	–	0
Syracuse		–		–		5	–	6	–	0
East Carolina		–		–		4	–	7	–	0
Illinois State		–		–		4	–	7	–	0
Temple		–		–		4	–	7	–	0
Army		–		–		3	–	7	–	1
Holy Cross		–		–		3	–	8	–	0
Cincinnati		–		–		2	–	9	–	0
Memphis State		–		–		2	–	9	–	0
William & Mary		–		–		2	–	9	–	0
Georgia Tech		–		–		1	–	9	–	1
Rankings from AP Poll

The 1980 Florida State Seminoles football team represented Florida State University as an independent during the 1980 NCAA Division I-A football season. Led by fifth-year head coach Bobby Bowden, the Seminoles compiled a record of 10–2 with a loss to Oklahoma in the Orange Bowl. Florida State played home games at Doak Campbell Stadium in Tallahassee, Florida. The team was selected co-national champion by Rothman (FACT).

Florida State finished No. 5 in the AP poll and the UPI poll. The Seminoles' offense scored 369 points while the defense allowed 103 points. Sam Platt led the team in rushing with 983 yards and 6 touchdowns. Rick Stockstill led the team in passing with 1377 yards and 15 touchdown passes. Michael Whiting led the team with 25 receptions while Hardis Johnson led with 419 receiving yards and 9 touchdowns. Keith Jones led the team with 5 pass interceptions.

Monk Bonasorte (DB), Bobby Butler (DB), Bill Capece (K), Greg Futch (G), Reggie Herring (LB), Ken Lanier (OT), Mark Macek (DT), Paul Piurowski (LB), and Rohn Stark (P) were selected to the first-team All-South independent team. Butler, Capece, Ron Simmons (NG), and Stark were selected as First team All-Americans. Bonasorte, Herring and Lanier were selected as second-team All-Americans, and Futch, Macek, and Piurowski were named honorable mention All-Americans by the Associated Press. Butler, Lanier, Simmons, Piurowski, and Capece were selected in the 1981 NFL draft. Butler was a first-round pick.

== Schedule ==
Date	Opponent	Rank	Site	TV	Result	Attendance	Source
September 6	at LSU	No. 13	Tiger Stadium; Baton Rouge, LA		W 16–0	77,535	
September 13	Louisville	No. 10	Doak Campbell Stadium; Tallahassee, FL		W 52–0	52,623	
September 20	East Carolina	No. 9	Doak Campbell Stadium; Tallahassee, FL		W 63–7	50,547	
September 27	at Miami (FL)	No. 9	Miami Orange Bowl; Miami, FL (rivalry)		L 9–10	50,008	
October 4	at No. 3 Nebraska	No. 16	Memorial Stadium; Lincoln, NE		W 18–14	76,152	
October 11	No. 4 Pittsburgh	No. 11	Doak Campbell Stadium; Tallahassee, FL		W 36–22	52,894	
October 18	Boston College^{†}	No. 7	Doak Campbell Stadium; Tallahassee, FL		W 41–7	52,396	
October 25	at Memphis State	No. 6	Liberty Bowl Memorial Stadium; Memphis, TN	ABC	W 24–3	28,778	
November 1	Tulsa	No. 5	Doak Campbell Stadium; Tallahassee, FL		W 45–2	47,683	
November 8	Virginia Tech	No. 3	Doak Campbell Stadium; Tallahassee, FL	ABC	W 31–7	51,487	
December 6	Florida	No. 3	Doak Campbell Stadium; Tallahassee, FL (rivalry)	ABC	W 17–13	53,772	
January 1	vs. No. 4 Oklahoma	No. 2	Miami Orange Bowl; Miami, FL (Orange Bowl)	NBC	L 17–18	71,043	
^{†}Homecoming; Rankings from AP Poll released prior to the game

== Game summaries ==
=== At LSU ===
Bill Capece kicked three field goals and Florida State’s defense held Louisiana State without any points as the Seminoles opened their season with a 16-0 victory in Tiger Stadium. Florida State led 6-0 at halftime on field goals of 34 and 35 yards by Capece. The only touchdown of the game came with 2:32 remaining in the third quarter. Sam Platt ran in from four yards out for the score.

=== Louisville ===
Rick Stockstill threw four touchdown passes as the Seminoles routed Louisville 52-0 before the biggest crowd ever (52,623) to see a football game at Doak Campbell Stadium. The Seminoles got the first six of their seven touchdowns on passes, as Kelly Lowrey and Blair Williams followed Stockstill with one apiece. Stockstill threw TD passes to Dennis McKinnon (8 yards), Zeke Mowatt (7 yards), Hardis Johnson (26 yards) and Phil Williams (19 yards). Johnson and McKinnon caught TD passes from Lowrey and Williams and Ron Hester returned an interception 50 yards for a touchdown.

=== East Carolina ===
With a devastating running game and formidable defense, the Seminoles romped to a 63-7 victory. Sam Platt ran for 130 yards on 29 carries and Mike Whiting 71 yards on 15 carries. Rick Stockstill completed 10 of 11 passes for 132 yards. Ahead 35-7 going into the final quarter, the Seminoles added four more touchdowns and 28 points in the 4th quarter. Michael Whiting, Ken Burnett and Larry Harris each ran for two touchdowns. FSU rolled up 559 yards of total offense while holding the Pirates to 102 yards of total offense.

=== at Miami (FL) ===
#9 Florida State Seminoles (3–0) at Miami (FL) Hurricanes (3–0)

Quarter	1	2	3	4	Total
Florida St	0	0	3	6	9
Miami (FL)	0	7	3	0	10

at Orange Bowl, Miami, Florida

- Date: September 27, 1980
- Game weather: 91 °F (33 °C)
- Game attendance: 50,000
- Recap/Box

Game information

First quarter

- No scoring

Second quarter

- UM – Jim Kelly 1-yard run (Dan Miller kick), 0:41. Miami (FL) 7–0.

Third quarter

- FSU – Bill Capece 26-yard field goal. Miami (FL) 7–3.
- UM – Dan Miller 22-yard field goal. Miami (FL) 10–3.

Fourth quarter

- FSU – Sam Childers 11-yard pass from Rick Stockstill (pass failed). Miami (FL) 10–9. Drive: 55 yards.

Top passers

- FSU – Rick Stockstill – 19/30, 182 yards, TD, INT
- UM – Jim Kelly – 13/22, 172 yards

Top rushers

- FSU – Sam Platt – 10 rushes, 23 yards
- UM

Top receivers

- FSU – Hardis Johnson – 4 receptions, 55 yards
- UM

External videos
- 1980 Florida State at Miami (FL) – Game broadcast

Fumble after fumble after fumble on the quarterback-center exchange stymied the frustrated Seminoles throughout the game as Florida State lost its only regular season game by 10-9 thanks to a questionable flag thrown. FSU was flagged for pass interference on a ball that sailed ten feet over the head of a Miami receiver running down the sideline. Coach Bowden argued that the ball was clearly uncatchable to no avail. Back then, pass interference calls were spot fouls and this penalty allowed Miami to kick an easy field goal to go up 10-3. Even so, the Seminoles almost pulled it out in the final minutes, driving 55 yards to a touchdown that came on an 11 yard pass from Rick Stockstill to Sam Childers with 39 seconds left. Coach Bobby Bowden made the decision to go for a winning two points, rather than settle for a 10-10 tie. Stockstill’s pass in the quest for two hit the helmet of leaping nose guard at the line of scrimmage and never had a chance to reach a Seminole. This was the only loss in an otherwise outstanding season with the Seminoles defeating #3 Nebraska and #4 Pittsburgh in back-to-back games.

=== At Nebraska ===
Trailing by 4 points as the clock wound down under 15 seconds, Nebraska QB Jeff Quinn was hit only three yards from the end zone, forcing a fumble which was recovered by Florida State. The Seminoles escaped Lincoln with a win. Behind 14-0 by the middle of the second quarter, Florida State fought back. The Seminoles took the lead for good, at 15-14, on the third field goal by Bill Capece, with 1:16 left in the third quarter. Capece added a 41 yard field goal with 2:31 left in the game.

=== Pittsburgh ===
Bill Capece kicked five field goals and Florida State fought from behind to a 36-22 victory over previously unbeaten 4th ranked Pittsburgh. Rick Stockstill threw three touchdown passes. Stockstill’s TD passes went to Hardis Johnson (23 yards), Sam Childers (4 yards) and Kurt Unglaub (13 yards). Keith Jones, Monk Bonasorte and Bobby Butler intercepted Dan Marino passes to lead the defense.

=== Boston College ===
Bill Capece kicked four field goals, and linebacker Ron Hester twice blocked Boston College punts as Florida State beat Boston College, 41-7, before a homecoming crowd of 52,396 at Doak Campbell Stadium. Hester returned one of his blocked punts 33 yards for a touchdown. Michael Whiting, Rick Stockstill and Kelly Lowery all ran for touchdowns.

=== At Memphis ===
Sam Platt rushed for 188 yards in 29 carries, breaking the school single-game record, leading the Seminoles to a 24-3 victory. The Seminoles had 464 yards of total offense while holding the Tigers to 183 yards of total offense. Platt and Michael Whiting ran for touchdowns and Rick Stockstill threw an 18 yard TD pass to Hardis Johnson.

=== Tulsa ===
Florida State routed the Golden Hurricane in a 45-2 victory before 47,683 fans at Doak Campbell Stadium. Florida State outgained Tulsa 444 yards to 160 yards. Michael Whiting ran for two touchdowns, Sam Platt and Ricky Williams each ran for one. Rick Stockstill passed for two touchdowns, one to Hardis Johnson (17 yards) and Kurt Unglaub (10 yards).

=== Virginia Tech ===
Scoring two touchdowns in 51 seconds, Florida State's football team overcame a sluggish start and went on to whip Virginia Tech 31-7 at Doak Campbell Stadium. FSU moved to 8-0 on games televised on ABC under Bobby Bowden. The Seminoles fell behind 7-0, then poured it on, scoring 31 straight points. Rick Stockstill ran for a touchdown and threw two touchdowns to Hardis Johnson. Sam Platt added a 9 yard TD run in the 4th quarter.

=== Florida ===
Florida Gators (7–3) at #3 Florida State Seminoles (9–1)

Quarter	1	2	3	4	Total
Florida	7	6	0	0	13
Florida St	3	0	7	7	17

at Doak Campbell Stadium, Tallahassee, Florida

- Date: December 6
- Game attendance: 53,772
- TV: ABC
- Recap/Box

Game information

First quarter

- FSU – Bill Capece 44-yard field goal, 8:28. Florida St 3–0.
- FLA – Tyrone Young 53-yard pass from Wayne Peace (Brian Clark kick), 2:31. Florida 7–3. Drive: 88 yards.

Second quarter

- FLA – Brian Clark 38-yard field goal, 9:55. Florida 10–3.
- FLA – Brian Clark 36-yard field goal, 1:48. Florida 13–3.

Third quarter

- FSU – Hardis Johnson 19-yard pass from Rick Stockstill (Bill Capece kick), 10:12. Florida 13–10.

Fourth quarter

- FSU – Hardis Johnson 20-yard pass from Rick Stockstill (Bill Capece kick), 14:24. Florida St 17–13.

Top passers

- FLA – Wayne Peace – 9/24, 160 yards, TD, 4 INT
- FSU – Rick Stockstill – 11/18, 137 yards, 2 TD, 2 INT

Top rushers

- FLA –
- FSU – Ricky Williams – 21 rushes, 75 yards

Top receivers

- FLA –
- FSU – Hardis Johnson – 7 receptions, 107 yards

Florida had a 13-3 lead well into the 3rd quarter on a Wayne Peace 53 yard TD pass to Tyrone Young and two Brian Clark field goals, one from 38 yards and the other from 36 yards. The Seminoles stormed back behind quarterback Rick Stockstill, who threw two touchdown passes to Hardis Johnson to lead the Noles to a 17-13 victory.

- Hardis Johnson - ABC Player of Game
- FSU: 16th straight win at home

=== Oklahoma—Orange Bowl ===
After a scoreless first quarter, Ricky Williams put Florida State ahead with his touchdown run, and Oklahoma countered with a long field goal by Mike Keeling; the Seminoles led 7–3 at halftime. To start the second half, Oklahoma drove 78 yards on twelve plays, and halfback David Overstreet scored from four yards out to take a 10–7 lead. A short field goal by Bill Capece tied the game at ten for the last tally of the third quarter. Four minutes into the final quarter, cornerback Bobby Butler recovered a botched punt snap in the end zone to give the Seminoles a 17–10 lead. With 3:19 remaining, Oklahoma's fate laid in the hands of senior quarterback J. C. Watts, who had turned the ball over three times on fumbles. He led the Sooners on a 78 yard drive, culminating with an eleven yard touchdown pass to wide receiver Steve Rhodes with 1:33 remaining. Down by a point, Oklahoma opted for the two point conversion attempt, and Watts completed a pass to tight end Forrest Valora in the end zone for a one point lead. Florida State tried to counter back, but Capece's 62 yard field goal attempt fell short, and the Sooners were victorious

== Roster ==
1980 Florida State Seminoles football team roster
Players
Coaches
Offense

Pos.	#	Name	Class
C	65	Trent Barnes	Sr
G	63	Lee Adams	Sr
OT	75	Tom Brannon	Sr
RB		Ken Burnett
TE		Sam Childers
RB		Darish Davis
OL		Greg Futch
RB		Larry Harris
TE		Rick Houston
WR		Hardis Johnson
RB		Homes Johnson
OT	72	Ken Lanier	Sr
QB		Kelly Lowery
OL		John Madden
WR	6	Dennis McKinnon	So
TE	81	Zeke Mowatt	So
WR		Sam Platt
RB		Eric Riley
OT	62	Eric Ryan	So
RB		Ernie Sims
QB		Rick Stockstill
C	56	Jim Thompson	Fr
QB	18	Weegie Thompson	So
WR	19	Kurt Unglaub	Sr
OT	73	Barry Voltapetti	Jr
WR	2	Reggie Webb	Fr
TE		Tom Wheeler
FB	27	Michael Whiting	Jr
QB		Blair Williams
WR		Phil Williams
RB		Ricky Williams

Defense

Pos.	#	Name	Class
DB	42	Monk Bonasarte	Sr
LB		Roger Brownlee
CB	21	Bobby Butler	Sr
DL	76	Alphonso Carreker	Fr
DB	24	Harvey Clayton	So
DL		Jarvis Coursey
DL		Garry Futch
DL		James Gilbert
DB		James Harris
DB	40	Gary Henry	Jr
LB		Reggie Herring
LB		Ron Hester
DB		Keith Jones
DT	67	Mark Macek	Sr
DB	13	Kim Mack	Fr
DL	60	Scott McLean	Jr
LB	53	Paul Piurowski	Sr
DL		Arthur Scott
DL	50	Ron Simmons	Sr

Special teams

Pos.	#	Name	Class
K	17	Bill Capece	Sr
P	3	Rohn Stark	Jr

Head coach

- Bobby Bowden

Coordinators/assistant coaches

- George Henshaw (Offensive coordinator)
- Kent Schoolfield (Wide receivers)
- Dick Hopkins (Graduate assistant)

Legend

- (C) Team captain
- (S) Suspended
- (I) Ineligible
- Injured
- Redshirt
