= 1980 Ole Miss Rebels football team =

American college football season

1980 Ole Miss Rebels football
- Conference: Southeastern Conference
- Record: 3–8 (2–4 SEC)
- Head coach: Steve Sloan (3rd season)
- Offensive coordinator: John Cropp (3rd season)
- Defensive coordinator: Paul Crane (2nd season)
- Home stadium: Hemingway Stadium; Mississippi Veterans Memorial Stadium

1980 Southeastern Conference football standings
	Conf.					Overall
Team	W		L		T	W		L		T
No. 1 Georgia $	6	–	0	–	0	12	–	0	–	0
No. 19 Mississippi State	5	–	1	–	0	9	–	3	–	0
No. 6 Alabama	5	–	1	–	0	10	–	2	–	0
LSU	4	–	2	–	0	7	–	4	–	0
Florida	4	–	2	–	0	8	–	4	–	0
Tennessee	3	–	3	–	0	5	–	6	–	0
Ole Miss	2	–	4	–	0	3	–	8	–	0
Kentucky	1	–	5	–	0	3	–	8	–	0
Auburn	0	–	6	–	0	5	–	6	–	0
Vanderbilt	0	–	6	–	0	2	–	9	–	0
$ – Conference champion; Rankings from AP Poll

The 1980 Ole Miss Rebels football team represented the University of Mississippi as a member of the Southeastern Conference (SEC) during the 1980 NCAA Division I-A football season. Led by third-year head coach Steve Sloan, the Rebels compiled an overall record of 3–8 with a mark of 2–4 in conference play, and finished seventhin the SEC. Ole Miss played home games at Hemingway Stadium in Oxford, Mississippi and Mississippi Veterans Memorial Stadium in Jackson, Mississippi.

== Schedule ==
Date	Opponent	Site	Result	Attendance	Source
September 6	Texas A&M*	Mississippi Veterans Memorial Stadium; Jackson, MS	L 20–23	47,482	
September 13	Memphis State*	Hemingway Stadium; Oxford, MS (rivalry)	W 61–7	41,412	
September 20	No. 1 Alabama (Note: Prior to the 1980 season, the SEC ruled if two SEC teams scheduled each other independently, and not through the conference office, the game would not count in SEC standings. As such, although both were members of the SEC, the Alabama–Ole Miss games in 1980 and 1981 did not count as conference games in the official SEC standings.)*	Mississippi Veterans Memorial Stadium; Jackson, MS (rivalry)	L 35–59	50,686	
September 27	Tulane*	Hemingway Stadium; Oxford, MS (rivalry)	L 24–26	37,419	
October 4	vs. Southern Miss*	Mississippi Veterans Memorial Stadium; Jackson, MS	L 22–28	47,211	
October 11	at No. 6 Georgia	Sanford Stadium; Athens, GA	L 21–28	60,300	
October 18	Florida^{†}	Hemingway Stadium; Oxford, MS	L 3–15	36,012	
October 25	at Vanderbilt	Dudley Field; Nashville, TN (rivalry)	W 27–14	27,800	
November 1	at LSU	Tiger Stadium; Baton Rouge, LA (rivalry)	L 16–38	71,422	
November 15	vs. Tennessee	Liberty Bowl Memorial Stadium; Memphis, TN (rivalry)	W 20–9	50,033	
November 22	vs. No. 17 Mississippi State	Mississippi Veterans Memorial Stadium; Jackson, MS (Egg Bowl)	L 14–19	62,520	
*Non-conference game; ^{†}Homecoming; Rankings from AP Poll released prior to the game

== Personnel ==
1980 Ole Miss Rebels football team roster
Players
Coaches
Offense

Pos.	#	Name	Class
C	55	Chuck Commiskey	Sr
OL		Chris Cottam
OL		Adolph Duckworth
WR		Gino English
QB	1	John Fourcade	Jr
RB		Malvin Gibson
WR		James Harbour
WR		Michael Harmon
RB		Kinny Hooper
RB		Danny Jansen
QB		Skip Lane
TE		Don Lloyd
RB		Buford McGee
OL		Mark Moore
OL		Pat Phenix
QB		Scott Rushing
C	54	Mike Russell	Sr
WR	83	Norman Seawright	Sr
RB		Andre Thomas
RB		Chester Thornton
WR	30	Ken Toler	Sr
WR		Breck Tyler
TE		Billy Wise

Defense

Pos.	#	Name	Class
DB		Melvin Brown
DL		Bentley Burgess
DB		Johnny Burrow
LB		Dale Erves
DB		Mike Fountain
LB		Keith Fourcade
DL		Bryan Kennedy
LB		Carl Lewis
DL		James Otis
LB		Danny Robertson
DL		Andy Shaw
DB		Bobo Thomas
LB		Nakita Williams

Special teams

Pos.	#	Name	Class
K		Todd Gatlin
P		Darryl Graham

Head coach

- Steve Sloan

Coordinators/assistant coaches

Legend

- (C) Team captain
- (S) Suspended
- (I) Ineligible
- Injured
- Redshirt
