= George MacIntyre =

American football player and coach (1939–2016)

Biographical details
- Born: April 30, 1939; St. Petersburg, Florida, U.S.
- Died: January 5, 2016 (aged 76); Nashville, Tennessee, U.S.

Playing career
- 1958–1960: Miami (FL)

Coaching career (HC unless noted)
- 1961, 1963: Jacksonville Parker HS (FL) (assistant)
- 1964–1967: Miami (FL) (scout)
- 1968–1969: Tampa (DC)
- 1970–1972: Clemson (DB)
- 1973–1974: Vanderbilt (assistant)
- 1975–1977: Tennessee–Martin
- 1978: Ole Miss (OC)
- 1979–1985: Vanderbilt
- 1991–1992: Donelson Christian Academy (TN)
- 1993–1994: Episcopal HS of Jacksonville (FL)
- 1995–1996: Liberty (DC)
- 1997–1998: Liberty (RB)

Head coaching record
- Overall: 43–66–1 (college)
- Bowls: 0–1

Accomplishments and honors

Awards
- Bobby Dodd Coach of the Year Award (1982); Sporting News College Football COY (1982); SEC Coach of the Year (1982)

George Wallace MacIntyre (April 30, 1939 – January 5, 2016) was an American football player and coach. He served as the head coach at the University of Tennessee at Martin from 1975 to 1977 and at Vanderbilt University from 1979 to 1985, compiling a career college football record of 43–66–1. At Vanderbilt in 1982, he won the Bobby Dodd Coach of the Year Award.

== Biography ==
MacIntyre was born in St. Petersburg, Florida, and graduated from Andrew Jackson High School in Jacksonville, Florida, in 1957 and played quarterback on the school football team. He then was quarterback at the University of Miami for the 1958 season. MacIntyre sat out the 1957 season due to a broken wrist and served as a backup to All-America quarterback Fran Curci in 1958 and 1959 and to Eddie Johns in 1960. For the 1960 season, MacIntyre also was the holder for field goals. In Miami's final game of 1960, against Air Force, MacIntyre successfully threw a touchdown pass as part of a fake field goal. This play contributed to Miami's 23–14 victory and earned MacIntyre the nickname "The Finger". After graduating from Miami, MacIntyre became an assistant football coach at Terry Parker High School in Jacksonville in 1961 and 1963 and served in the military in 1962. In 1964, MacIntyre became a football recruiting administrator at the University of Miami. He would stay at Miami until 1967 and would join the University of Tampa football coaching staff as defensive coordinator in 1968.

From 1970 to 1972, MacIntyre was the defensive backs coach at Clemson and then was assistant coach for Vanderbilt from 1973 to 1974. The 1974 Peach Bowl between Vanderbilt and Texas Tech ended with a 6–6 tie. MacIntyre took his first head coaching position in 1975 with Tennessee–Martin and remained head coach until 1977. In three seasons, MacIntyre had an overall 18–14 record, with a 2–8 record in 1975 and 8–3 records in both 1976 and 1977. In 1978, MacIntyre was offensive coordinator for Ole Miss (the University of Mississippi).

MacIntyre again became a head coach in 1979, this time with Vanderbilt, having previously been an assistant coach for Vanderbilt from 1973 to 1974. Following three losing seasons (1–10 in 1979, 2–9 in 1980, and 4–7 in 1981), Vanderbilt went 8–4 in 1982 and earned a berth in the Hall of Fame Classic. This would be Vanderbilt's only winning season with MacIntyre as coach, and MacIntyre had an overall 25–52–1 record as Vanderbilt head coach from 1979 to 1985. After the 1985 season, MacIntyre resigned from Vanderbilt, blaming the "continuing rise in academic standards, both in admissions and in the retaining of student athletes" for Vanderbilt's losing seasons.

After leaving Vanderbilt, MacIntyre led a company that provided summer sales employment to college athletes until 1991, when he became head football coach and interim headmaster of Donelson Christian Academy in Nashville, the city where Vanderbilt is located. MacIntyre returned to Jacksonville in 1993 as the head coach at the Episcopal School of Jacksonville and worked his final coaching position as running backs coach at Liberty University. In 1999, MacIntyre retired from coaching after being diagnosed with multiple sclerosis.

MacIntyre's son George Michael "Mike" MacIntyre has been a football coach at both the collegiate and professional levels since the 1990s and became head coach at the University of Colorado in 2012. George MacIntyre died on January 5, 2016, at the age of 76. At the time of his death, he was being treated for multiple sclerosis, which he had for more than 20 years.

== Head coaching record ==
Year	Team	Overall	Conference	Standing	Bowl/playoffs
Tennessee–Martin Pacers (Gulf South Conference) (1975–1977)
1975	Tennessee–Martin	2–8	1–7	9th	
1976	Tennessee–Martin	8–3	5–3	T–4th	
1977	Tennessee–Martin	8–3	6–2	T–2nd	
Tennessee–Martin:		18–14	12–12		
Vanderbilt Commodores (Southeastern Conference) (1979–1985)
1979	Vanderbilt	1–10	0–6	T–9th	
1980	Vanderbilt	2–9	0–6	T–9th	
1981	Vanderbilt	4–7	1–5	10th	
1982	Vanderbilt	8–4	4–2	T–3rd	L Hall of Fame Classic
1983	Vanderbilt	2–9	0–6	T–9th	
1984	Vanderbilt	5–6	2–4	T–7th	
1985	Vanderbilt	3–7–1	1–4–1	8th	
Vanderbilt:		25–52–1	8–33–1		
Total:		43–66–1			
