= Tim Ross (American football) =

American football player (born 1958)

No. 93
- Position: Linebacker

Personal information
- Born: December 27, 1958 (age 67); Toledo, Ohio, U.S.
- Listed height: 6 ft 5 in (1.96 m)
- Listed weight: 225 lb (102 kg)

Career information
- High school: Woodward (Toledo)
- College: Bowling Green
- NFL draft: 1981: undrafted

Career history
- New England Patriots (1981)*; Detroit Lions (1987)
- * Offseason or practice squad member only

Career NFL statistics
- Sacks: 1
- Stats at Pro Football Reference

Timothy Leon Ross (born December 27, 1958) is an American former professional football player who was a linebacker for the Detroit Lions of the National Football League (NFL). He played college football for the Bowling Green Falcons.
