= Admiral Dewey Larry =

American football player (born 1958)

No. 42, 21
- Position: Defensive back

Personal information
- Born: September 1, 1958 (age 68); New Orleans, Louisiana, U.S.
- Listed height: 5 ft 11 in (1.80 m)
- Listed weight: 192 lb (87 kg)

Career information
- High school: Technical (Omaha, Nebraska)
- College: Southern (1977); Contra Costa (1978); UNLV (1979–1980)
- NFL draft: 1981: 9th round, 225th overall pick

Career history
- New York Jets (1981)*; Tampa Bay Buccaneers (1982)*; Arizona Wranglers (1983); San Francisco 49ers (1983)*; Ottawa Rough Riders (1984)
- * Offseason or practice squad member only

Admiral Dewey Larry Jr. (born September 1, 1958) is an American former professional football defensive back who played for the Arizona Wranglers of the United States Football League (USFL) and the Ottawa Rough Riders of the Canadian Football League (CFL). He was selected by the New York Jets in the ninth round of the 1981 NFL draft after playing college football at the University of Nevada, Las Vegas.

== Early life ==
Admiral Dewey Larry Jr. was born on September 1, 1958, in New Orleans, Louisiana. He attended Technical High School in Omaha, Nebraska.

== College career ==
Larry was a member of the Southern Jaguars of Southern University in 1977. He played at Contra Costa College in 1978. He was then a two-year letterman for the UNLV Rebels of the University of Nevada, Las Vegas from 1979 to 1980. He was a running back for the Rebels in 1979, rushing five times for 36 yards while also returning one kick for 53 yards. He converted to defensive back in 1980. Larry was also on the track team at UNLV.

== Professional career ==
Larry was selected by the New York Jets in the ninth round, with the 225th overall pick, of the 1981 NFL draft as a defensive back. He was released by the Jets on August 4, 1981.

Larry signed with the Tampa Bay Buccaneers of the NFL on February 9, 1982. He was released on September 6, 1982.

He played in nine games, starting seven, for the Arizona Wranglers of the United States Football League (USFL) during the 1983 USFL season. He was listed as a free safety / right cornerback during his time with the Wranglers.

He was signed by the NFL's San Francisco 49ers on June 10, 1983, but was later released.

Larry appeared in two games for the Ottawa Rough Riders of the Canadian Football League in 1984, returning three kicks for 52 yards and three punts for 13 yards. He was listed as a defensive back while with the Rough Riders.
