= Victor Jackson (American football) =

American football player (born 1959)

No. 20, 21, 39, 49
- Position: Defensive back

Personal information
- Born: August 6, 1959 (age 67); Princess Anne, Maryland, U.S.
- Listed height: 6 ft 0 in (1.83 m)
- Listed weight: 205 lb (93 kg)

Career information
- High school: DuVal (MD)
- College: Bowie State
- NFL draft: 1981: undrafted

Career history
- New Orleans Saints (1981)*; Washington Federals/Orlando Renegades (1983–1985); Indianapolis Colts (1986); Los Angeles Raiders (1987)
- * Offseason or practice squad member only
- Stats at Pro Football Reference

Victor Jackson (born August 6, 1959) is an American former professional football player who was a defensive back in the National Football League (NFL). He played college football for the Bowie State Bulldogs. He played in the NFL for the Indianapolis Colts in 1986 and the Los Angeles Raiders in 1987.
