= Mike Robinson (defensive end) =

American football player (1956–2022)

No. 92, 78
- Position: Defensive end

Personal information
- Born: August 19, 1956; Cleveland, Ohio, U.S.
- Died: November 26, 2022 (aged 66)
- Listed height: 6 ft 4 in (1.93 m)
- Listed weight: 265 lb (120 kg)

Career information
- High school: Glenville (OH)
- College: Arizona; Oklahoma State
- NFL draft: 1981: 4th round, 95th overall pick

Career history
- Cleveland Browns (1981–1982); New Orleans Breakers (1984); Arizona Outlaws (1985)

Awards and highlights
- Second-team All-Pac-10 (1980)

Career NFL statistics
- Sacks: 5
- Fumble recoveries: 1
- Stats at Pro Football Reference

Michael Bruce Robinson (August 19, 1956 – November 26, 2022) was an American professional football defensive end who played for the Cleveland Browns of the National Football League (NFL). He attended Glenville High School in Cleveland, Ohio.

== Career ==
Robinson played college football at the University of Arizona and Oklahoma State University. He was drafted by Cleveland in the fourth round with the 95th pick in the 1981 NFL draft. He played for Cleveland in 18 games in the 1981 and 1982 seasons.

== Death ==
Robinson died on November 26, 2022, at the age of 66.
