= 1980 Vanderbilt Commodores football team =

American college football season

1980 Vanderbilt Commodores football
- Conference: Southeastern Conference
- Record: 2–9 (0–6 SEC)
- Head coach: George MacIntyre (2nd season)
- Offensive coordinator: Red Parker (1st season)
- Defensive coordinator: Ron McCrone (2nd season)
- Home stadium: Dudley Field

1980 Southeastern Conference football standings
| | Conf. | | | | | Overall |
| Team | W | | L | | T | W | | L | | T |
|---|---|---|---|---|---|---|---|---|---|---|
| No. 1 Georgia $ | 6 | – | 0 | – | 0 | 12 | – | 0 | – | 0 |
| No. 19 Mississippi State | 5 | – | 1 | – | 0 | 9 | – | 3 | – | 0 |
| No. 6 Alabama | 5 | – | 1 | – | 0 | 10 | – | 2 | – | 0 |
| LSU | 4 | – | 2 | – | 0 | 7 | – | 4 | – | 0 |
| Florida | 4 | – | 2 | – | 0 | 8 | – | 4 | – | 0 |
| Tennessee | 3 | – | 3 | – | 0 | 5 | – | 6 | – | 0 |
| Ole Miss | 2 | – | 4 | – | 0 | 3 | – | 8 | – | 0 |
| Kentucky | 1 | – | 5 | – | 0 | 3 | – | 8 | – | 0 |
| Auburn | 0 | – | 6 | – | 0 | 5 | – | 6 | – | 0 |
| Vanderbilt | 0 | – | 6 | – | 0 | 2 | – | 9 | – | 0 |
$ – Conference champion; Rankings from AP Poll

The 1980 Vanderbilt Commodores football team represented Vanderbilt University in the 1980 NCAA Division I-A football season. The Commodores were led by head coach George MacIntyre in his second season and finished the season with a record of two wins and nine losses (2–9 overall, 0–6 in the SEC).

== Schedule ==
| Date | Opponent | Site | Result | Attendance | Source |
|---|---|---|---|---|---|
| September 13 | at Maryland* | Byrd Stadium; College Park, MD | L 6–31 | 27,150 | |
| September 20 | Mississippi State | Dudley Field; Nashville, TN | L 14–24 | 29,300 | |
| September 27 | at No. 1 Alabama | Bryant–Denny Stadium; Tuscaloosa, AL | L 0–41 | 60,210 | |
| October 11 | Tulane* | Dudley Field; Nashville, TN | L 21–43 | 35,960 | |
| October 18 | at No. 6 Georgia | Sanford Stadium; Athens, GA (rivalry) | L 0–41 | 59,300 | |
| October 25 | Ole Miss^{†} | Dudley Field; Nashville, TN (rivalry) | L 14–27 | 27,800 | |
| November 1 | at Memphis State* | Liberty Bowl Memorial Stadium; Memphis, TN | W 14–10 | 18,422 | |
| November 8 | at Kentucky | Commonwealth Stadium; Lexington, KY (rivalry) | L 10–31 | 54,522 | |
| November 15 | Miami (FL)* | Dudley Field; Nashville, TN | L 17–24 | 12,830 | |
| November 22 | Chattanooga* | Dudley Field; Nashville, TN | W 31–29 | 22,700 | |
| November 29 | Tennessee | Dudley Field; Nashville, TN (rivalry) | L 13–51 | 31,100 | |
*Non-conference game; ^{†}Homecoming; Rankings from AP Poll released prior to the game

== Roster ==
1980 Vanderbilt Commodores football team roster
Players
Coaches
Offense

| Pos. | # | Name | Class |
|---|---|---|---|
| QB | 7 | Van Heflin | Jr |
| QB | 10 | Whit Taylor | So |

Defense

| Pos. | # | Name | Class |

Special teams

| Pos. | # | Name | Class |
|---|---|---|---|
| P | 6 | Jim Arnold | So |

Head coach

- George MacIntyre

Coordinators/assistant coaches

Legend

- (C) Team captain
- (S) Suspended
- (I) Ineligible
- Injured
- Redshirt
