= 1980 Georgia Bulldogs football team =

American college football season

1980 Georgia Bulldogs football

Consensus national champion SEC champion Sugar Bowl champion

Sugar Bowl, W 17–10 vs. Notre Dame
- Conference: Southeastern Conference

Ranking
- Coaches: No. 1
- AP: No. 1
- Record: 12–0 (6–0 SEC)
- Head coach: Vince Dooley (17th season)
- Offensive coordinator: George Haffner (1st season)
- Offensive scheme: I formation
- Defensive coordinator: Erk Russell (17th season)
- Base defense: 4–4
- Home stadium: Sanford Stadium

1980 Southeastern Conference football standings
	Conf.					Overall
Team	W		L		T	W		L		T
No. 1 Georgia $	6	–	0	–	0	12	–	0	–	0
No. 19 Mississippi State	5	–	1	–	0	9	–	3	–	0
No. 6 Alabama	5	–	1	–	0	10	–	2	–	0
LSU	4	–	2	–	0	7	–	4	–	0
Florida	4	–	2	–	0	8	–	4	–	0
Tennessee	3	–	3	–	0	5	–	6	–	0
Ole Miss	2	–	4	–	0	3	–	8	–	0
Kentucky	1	–	5	–	0	3	–	8	–	0
Auburn	0	–	6	–	0	5	–	6	–	0
Vanderbilt	0	–	6	–	0	2	–	9	–	0
$ – Conference champion; Rankings from AP Poll

The 1980 Georgia Bulldogs football team represented the University of Georgia during the 1980 NCAA Division I-A football season. The Bulldogs completed the season with a 12–0 record. The Bulldogs had a regular season Southeastern Conference (SEC) record of 6–0. The Bulldogs completed their season with a 17–10 victory over Notre Dame in the Sugar Bowl.

The team was named national champion by NCAA-designated major selectors of Associated Press, Berryman, Billingsley, Football News, Football Writers, Helms, National Championship Foundation, National Football Foundation, Poling System, Sporting News, and UPI (coaches), while co-champion by Rothman and Sagarin (ELO-Chess), resulting in a consensus national champion designation.

== Schedule ==
Date	Time	Opponent	Rank	Site	TV	Result	Attendance	Source
September 6	7:30 p.m.	at Tennessee	No. 16	Neyland Stadium; Knoxville, TN (rivalry)		W 16–15	95,288	
September 13	1:30 p.m.	Texas A&M*	No. 12	Sanford Stadium; Athens, GA		W 42–0	60,150	
September 20	1:30 p.m.	Clemson*	No. 10	Sanford Stadium; Athens, GA (rivalry)		W 20–16	61,800	
September 27	1:30 p.m.	TCU*	No. 10	Sanford Stadium; Athens, GA		W 34–3	59,200	
October 11	1:30 p.m.	Ole Miss	No. 6	Sanford Stadium; Athens, GA	ESPN (tape delay)	W 28–21	60,300	
October 18	1:30 p.m.	Vanderbilt^{†}	No. 6	Sanford Stadium; Athens, GA (rivalry)		W 41–0	59,300	
October 25	7:30 p.m.	at Kentucky	No. 5	Commonwealth Stadium; Lexington, KY		W 27–0	57,239	
November 1	12:35 p.m.	No. 14 South Carolina*	No. 4	Sanford Stadium; Athens, GA (rivalry)	ABC	W 13–10	62,200	
November 8	12:35 p.m.	vs. No. 20 Florida	No. 2	Gator Bowl Stadium; Jacksonville, FL (rivalry)	ABC	W 26–21	68,528	
November 15	2:30 p.m.	at Auburn	No. 1	Jordan-Hare Stadium; Auburn, AL (rivalry)		W 31–21	74,900	
November 29	1:30 p.m.	Georgia Tech*	No. 1	Sanford Stadium; Athens, GA (rivalry)		W 38–20	62,800	
January 1, 1981	2:00 p.m.	vs. No. 7 Notre Dame*	No. 1	Louisiana Superdome; New Orleans, LA (Sugar Bowl)	ABC	W 17–10	77,895	
*Non-conference game; ^{†}Homecoming; Rankings from AP Poll released prior to the game

== Before the season ==
Herschel Walker, a 6-1, 218-pound running back, and the most sought after high school football player in the nation, signed a national letter of intent to play for the University of Georgia Bulldogs on Easter Sunday, April 6, 1980. Mike Cavan helped provide head coach Vince Dooley with his prized recruit.

== Game summaries ==
=== Tennessee ===
The season began with junior Donnie McMickens starting ahead of Walker at tailback as the Bulldogs faced the University of Tennessee on September 6 in Knoxville. With Tennessee gaining a 9–0 lead early in the 2nd quarter, coach Dooley told his offensive coordinator, "I'm putting Herschel in...Don't be afraid to let him carry the ball."

Tennessee held a 15–2 advantage late in the third quarter when Walker changed the momentum of the game. Late in the third quarter, Walker scored on a pitch sweep from 16 yards out, where he ran over Tennessee's safety and future Dallas Cowboys teammate, Bill Bates, near the goal line. Walker scored again five minutes later on a 9-yard touchdown run as Georgia went on to win the game, 16–15.

=== Texas A&M ===
A week later, Georgia hosted Texas A&M as the Bulldogs got off to a 28–0 lead by halftime. With four minutes left in the third quarter, Walker broke off a 76-yard TD run. He finished with 21 carries for 145 yards and 3 touchdowns against the Aggies. Quarterback Buck Belue complemented Walker's ground game by going 6 of 13 for 147 passing yards during the contest.

=== Clemson ===
In the games that followed, Georgia raced to a 6–0 start by knocking off Clemson (20–16), TCU (34–3), Ole Miss (28–21), and Vanderbilt (41–0). Walker ran for 121 yards against Clemson and 69 more versus TCU—including a 41-yard run. Georgia's 20-16 win over Clemson was even closer than the score indicated, as the Tigers held Georgia to just 155 total yards, of offense which was just 34 more than Walker's rush total. Walker needed help from senior CB/PR Scott Woerner to get past defensive-minded Clemson as the return man delivered with a 67-yard punt return for a score early in the first quarter as the Bulldogs would go on to win a close one.

=== Ole Miss ===
Walker missed much of the Ole Miss game with an injury.

=== Vanderbilt ===
In the Vandy game on October 18, Walker had 23 rushes for a career-high 283 yards, scoring on long touchdown runs of 60, 48, and 53 yards.

=== South Carolina ===
The special teams and defense gave Georgia the upper hand in the two weekends that followed and helped the Bulldogs get past Kentucky (27–0) and South Carolina (13–10). The win in Athens, Georgia over the Gamecocks on November 1 featured Walker matching up with the eventual Heisman Trophy winner, George Rogers. Georgia got out to a 13–0 lead early in the third quarter and held on to win by three points. Walker's 76-yard touchdown run gave Georgia a commanding lead at 10–0 with early in the third quarter. Walker rushed 43 times for 219 yards. Rogers similarly kept pace, gaining 168 yards on 35 carries.

=== Florida ===
#20 Florida Gators (6–1) vs. #2 Georgia Bulldogs (8–0)

Quarter	1	2	3	4	Total
Georgia	7	7	6	6	26
Florida	3	7	0	11	21

at Gator Bowl • Jacksonville, Florida

- Date: November 8
- Game weather: Sunny
- Game attendance: 68,528
- TV announcers (ABC): Al Michaels and Frank Broyles

Game information

Georgia

- Buck Belue
  7/16, 145 Yds, TD, 2 INT
- Herschel Walker
  37 Rush, 238 Yds, TD
- Lindsay Scott
  2 Rec, 114 Yds, TD

Florida

- Wayne Peace
  20/37, 286 Yds, TD, 2 INT
- James Jones
  22 Rush, 89 Yds, TD
- Tyrone Young
  10 Rec, 183 Yds

Georgia had made it to 8–0 when coach Dooley's Bulldogs faced the most daunting task of the year. The game would be affectionately referred to as the "Miracle on Duval Street" as second-ranked Georgia faced a 6–1 Florida Gators team in Jacksonville on November 8. Walker started things off by taking a toss sweep play to the right for 72 yards and a score early in the first quarter. Walker carried Georgia's offense that afternoon by rushing 37 times for 238 yards against the Gators. Georgia extended its lead to 20–10 late in the 3rd quarter when Florida began to mount its comeback. Florida QB Wayne Peace directed two scoring drives that gave the Gators a 21–20 lead late. With time running out on 3rd-and-11, QB Buck Belue found WR Lindsay Scott for a 93-yard touchdown pass to give Georgia the win, 26–21.

Scoring summary

Quarter	Time	Drive			Team	Scoring information	Score	
Quarter	Time	Plays	Yards	TOP	Team	Scoring information	UGA	FLA
1	13:09				Georgia	Walker 72-yard touchdown run, Robinson kick good	7	0
1	7:07				Florida	40-yard field goal by Clark	7	3
2	13:29		77		Georgia	Stewart 13-yard touchdown reception from Belue, Robinson kick good	14	3
2	7:10				Florida	Collinsworth 9-yard touchdown reception from Peace, Clark kick good	14	10
3	9:38				Georgia	24-yard field goal by Robinson	17	10
3	3:58				Georgia	20-yard field goal by Robinson	20	10
4	14:14		81		Florida	Jones 11-yard touchdown run, 2-point pass good	20	18
4	6:52	11			Florida	40-yard field goal by Clark	20	21
4	1:03				Georgia	Scott 93-yard touchdown reception from Belue, 2-point pass incomplete	26	21
"TOP" = time of possession. For other American football terms, see Glossary of American football.							26	21

=== Auburn ===
Georgia clinched the SEC Championship on November 15 by taking out Auburn on the road, 31–21. Walker did most of the work by rushing 27 times for 84 yards, including an 18-yard touchdown.

=== Georgia Tech ===
Two weeks later, Walker ended the regular season with an exclamation point by scoring on touchdown runs of 1, 23, and 65 yards as Georgia defeated in-state rival Georgia Tech, 38–20. Walker rushed 25 times for 205 yards against the Ramblin' Wreck.

=== Notre Dame ===
The Bulldogs were ranked No. 1 at 11–0 as they were invited to play a traditional football power, coach Dan Devine's Notre Dame Fighting Irish (9–1–1), in the Sugar Bowl in New Orleans, La. on January 1, 1981. With the score tied 3–3, Walker took center stage after Notre Dame failed to properly field a kickoff. Two plays later, Walker dove over the top for a 1-yard touchdown run to give UGA a 10–3 lead. He took advantage of more Irish misfortune as a Notre Dame fumble set Georgia up at the Irish 22-yard line. Three plays later, Walker was in the end zone again for a 17–3 lead. Georgia held on to win, 17–10. Walker, who suffered a dislocated left shoulder very early in the game, managed to rush 36 times for 150 yards, including a longest run of 23 yards.

At the season's conclusion, Walker helped his Georgia Bulldogs complete a 12–0 record as the Associated Press voted the University of Georgia No. 1 with 58½ first place votes to Pittsburgh's 3½. Walker and his teammates were also voted No. 1 by the United Press International Poll—which listed Georgia with 36 first place votes to Pitt's 3.

This was Georgia's last national championship until 2021.

== Roster ==
1980 Georgia Bulldogs football team roster
Players
Coaches
Offense

Pos.	#	Name	Class
OT	77	Jim Blakewood	Jr
QB	8	Buck Belue	Jr
TE	88	Norris Brown	So
QB	17	Daryll Jones	Fr
WR	80	Charles Junior	So
WR	24	Lindsay Scott	Jr
FB	33	Ronnie Stewart	Jr
RB	34	Herschel Walker	Fr
TE	30	Scott Williams	Fr
FB	25	Jimmy Womack	Sr

Defense

Pos.	#	Name	Class
CB	31	Mike Fisher	Sr
S	49	Jeff Hipp	Sr
DL	98	Tim Parks	Sr
LB	46	Danny Rogers	Sr
CB	19	Scott Woerner	Sr

Special teams

Pos.	#	Name	Class
K	6	Rex Robinson	Sr

Head coach

- Vince Dooley

Coordinators/assistant coaches

Legend

- (C) Team captain
- (S) Suspended
- (I) Ineligible
- Injured
- Redshirt
