= Skip Lane =

American football player (born 1960)

No. 37, 26, 39
- Positions: Cornerback, safety

Personal information
- Born: January 30, 1960 (age 66); Norwalk, Connecticut, U.S.

Career information
- High school: Staples (CT).
- College: Ole Miss
- NFL draft: 1984: undrafted

Career history
- Kansas City Chiefs (1984); New York Jets (1984); Washington Redskins (1987)

Career NFL statistics
- Games played: 7
- Games started: 3
- Stats at Pro Football Reference

Paul John "Skip" Lane Jr. (born January 30, 1960) is an American former professional football player who was a defensive back for two seasons in the National Football League (NFL). He played college football for the Ole Miss Rebels.

Lane was featured in the ESPN documentary Year of the Scab. In 2018, Lane was awarded a Super Bowl ring for playing for the Washington Redskins in 1987, the year they won Super Bowl XXII.
