= 1980 Florida Gators football team =

American college football season

1980 Florida Gators football

Tangerine Bowl, W 35–20 vs. Maryland
- Conference: Southeastern Conference

Ranking
- Coaches: No. 19
- Record: 8–4 (4–2 SEC)
- Head coach: Charley Pell (2nd season)
- Offensive coordinator: Mike Shanahan (1st season)
- Captains: Timothy Groves; Cris Collinsworth; Timothy Golden; David Little
- Home stadium: Florida Field

1980 Southeastern Conference football standings
	Conf.					Overall
Team	W		L		T	W		L		T
No. 1 Georgia $	6	–	0	–	0	12	–	0	–	0
No. 19 Mississippi State	5	–	1	–	0	9	–	3	–	0
No. 6 Alabama	5	–	1	–	0	10	–	2	–	0
LSU	4	–	2	–	0	7	–	4	–	0
Florida	4	–	2	–	0	8	–	4	–	0
Tennessee	3	–	3	–	0	5	–	6	–	0
Ole Miss	2	–	4	–	0	3	–	8	–	0
Kentucky	1	–	5	–	0	3	–	8	–	0
Auburn	0	–	6	–	0	5	–	6	–	0
Vanderbilt	0	–	6	–	0	2	–	9	–	0
$ – Conference champion; Rankings from AP Poll

The 1980 Florida Gators football team represented the University of Florida during the 1980 NCAA Division I-A football season. The season was the Florida Gators football team's second season under new head coach Charles B. "Charley" Pell, and marked a remarkable one-year turnaround for the Gators from their 0–10–1 record in 1979. The winless 1979 season was the worst season in Gators history, and it was Pell's first campaign as the new head coach of the Gators, after the Gators' previous head coach, Doug Dickey, was fired in the aftermath of a 4–7 season in 1978. Pell's 1980 Florida Gators posted an 8–4 overall record and a Southeastern Conference (SEC) record of 4–2, tying for fourth place in the ten-team SEC. The Gators capped their season with a 35–20 bowl victory over the Maryland Terrapins in the Tangerine Bowl, marking the first time in the history of major college football that a winless team received a bowl bid the following season. Linebacker David Little set the career record for tackles by a Gator and was consensus All-American. Receivers Cris Collinsworth was first-team All-American. Ted Alston was the second receiver. The season features the famous "Run Lindsay Run" in the close loss to national champion Georgia.

== Schedule ==
Date	Opponent	Rank	Site	TV	Result	Attendance	Source
September 13	vs. California*		Tampa Stadium; Tampa, FL		W 41–13	41,388	
September 20	at Georgia Tech*		Grant Field; Atlanta, GA		W 45–12	35,165	
September 27	Mississippi State		Florida Field; Gainesville, FL		W 21–15	56,225	
October 4	LSU	No. 19	Florida Field; Gainesville, FL (rivalry)		L 7–24	59,299	
October 18	at Ole Miss		Hemingway Stadium; Oxford, MS		W 15–3	36,012	
October 25	Louisville*^{†}		Florida Field; Gainesville, FL		W 13–0	62,687	
November 1	Auburn		Florida Field; Gainesville, FL (rivalry)		W 21–10	63,274	
November 8	vs. No. 2 Georgia	No. 20	Gator Bowl Stadium; Jacksonville, FL (rivalry)	ABC	L 21–26	68,528	
November 15	at Kentucky	No. 20	Commonwealth Stadium; Lexington, KY (rivalry)		W 17–15	51,766	
November 29	Miami (FL)*	No. 18	Florida Field; Gainesville, FL (rivalry)	ABC	L 7–31	56,437	
December 6	at No. 3 Florida State*	No. 19	Doak Campbell Stadium; Tallahassee, FL (rivalry)	ABC	L 13–17	53,772	
December 20	vs. Maryland*		Orlando Stadium; Orlando, FL (Tangerine Bowl)	MTN	W 35–20	52,541	
*Non-conference game; ^{†}Homecoming; Rankings from AP Poll released prior to the game

== Game summaries ==
=== California ===
Team	1	2	3	4	Total
California	0	13	0	0	13
• Florida	13	0	21	7	41

- Date: September 13
- Location: Tampa Stadium
- Game attendance: 41,388

Scoring summary
Q1	8:58	FLA	Kellom 1 yard run (Clark kick)	FLA 7–0
Q1	3:29	FLA	Clark 33 yard field goal	FLA 10–0
Q1	:24	FLA	Clark 49 yard field goal	FLA 13–0
Q2	10:46	CAL	Lewis 24 yard pass from Campbell (Luckhurst kick)	FLA 13–7
Q2	3:29	CAL	Luckhurst 42 yard field goal	FLA 13–10
Q2	:04	CAL	Luckhurst 30 yard field goal	Tie 13–13
Q3	5:49	FLA	Faulkner 9 yard pass from Hawko (Clark kick)	FLA 20–13
Q3	3:11	FLA	Jones 3 yard run (Clark kick)	FLA 27–13
Q3	1:15	FLA	Garrett 20 yard pass from Hawko (Clark kick)	FLA 34–13
Q4	13:23	FLA	T. Williams 2 yard run (Clark kick)	FLA 41–13

=== Vs. Georgia ===
#20 Florida Gators (6–1) vs. #2 Georgia Bulldogs (8–0)

Quarter	1	2	3	4	Total
Georgia	7	7	6	6	26
Florida	3	7	0	11	21

at Gator Bowl • Jacksonville, Florida

- Date: November 8
- Game weather: Sunny
- Game attendance: 68,528
- TV announcers (ABC): Al Michaels and Frank Broyles

Game information

Georgia

- Buck Belue
  7/16, 145 Yds, TD, 2 INT
- Herschel Walker
  37 Rush, 238 Yds, TD
- Lindsay Scott
  2 Rec, 114 Yds, TD

Florida

- Wayne Peace
  20/37, 286 Yds, TD, 2 INT
- James Jones
  22 Rush, 89 Yds, TD
- Tyrone Young
  10 Rec, 183 Yds

Scoring summary

Quarter	Time	Drive			Team	Scoring information	Score	
Quarter	Time	Plays	Yards	TOP	Team	Scoring information	UGA	FLA
1	13:09				Georgia	Walker 72-yard touchdown run, Robinson kick good	7	0
1	7:07				Florida	40-yard field goal by Clark	7	3
2	13:29		77		Georgia	Stewart 13-yard touchdown reception from Belue, Robinson kick good	14	3
2	7:10				Florida	Collinsworth 9-yard touchdown reception from Peace, Clark kick good	14	10
3	9:38				Georgia	24-yard field goal by Robinson	17	10
3	3:58				Georgia	20-yard field goal by Robinson	20	10
4	14:14		81		Florida	Jones 11-yard touchdown run, 2-point pass good	20	18
4	6:52	11			Florida	40-yard field goal by Clark	20	21
4	1:03				Georgia	Scott 93-yard touchdown reception from Belue, 2-point pass incomplete	26	21
"TOP" = time of possession. For other American football terms, see Glossary of American football.							26	21

=== At Florida State ===
Florida Gators (7–3) at #3 Florida State Seminoles (9–1)

Quarter	1	2	3	4	Total
Florida	7	6	0	0	13
Florida St	3	0	7	7	17

at Doak Campbell Stadium, Tallahassee, Florida

- Date: December 6
- Game attendance: 53,772
- TV: ABC
- Recap/Box

Game information

First quarter

- FSU – Bill Capece 44-yard field goal, 8:28. Florida St 3–0.
- FLA – Tyrone Young 53-yard pass from Wayne Peace (Brian Clark kick), 2:31. Florida 7–3. Drive: 88 yards.

Second quarter

- FLA – Brian Clark 38-yard field goal, 9:55. Florida 10–3.
- FLA – Brian Clark 36-yard field goal, 1:48. Florida 13–3.

Third quarter

- FSU – Hardis Johnson 19-yard pass from Rick Stockstill (Bill Capece kick), 10:12. Florida 13–10.

Fourth quarter

- FSU – Hardis Johnson 20-yard pass from Rick Stockstill (Bill Capece kick), 14:24. Florida St 17–13.

Top passers

- FLA – Wayne Peace – 9/24, 160 yards, TD, 4 INT
- FSU – Rick Stockstill – 11/18, 137 yards, 2 TD, 2 INT

Top rushers

- FLA –
- FSU – Ricky Williams – 21 rushes, 75 yards

Top receivers

- FLA –
- FSU – Hardis Johnson – 7 receptions, 107 yards

== Personnel ==
1980 Florida Gators football team roster
Players
Coaches
Offense

Pos.	#	Name	Class
RB	14	Johnell Brown	So
WR	21	Cris Collinsworth (C)	Sr
RB		Calvin Davis
WR		Dwayne Dixon	Fr
TE	80	Chris Faulkner	So
OT	69	Dan Fike	So
WR	42	Johnny Gaffney	Jr
WR	28	Curt Garrett	Jr
QB	12	Bob Hewko	So
WR	89	Spencer Jackson	So
FB	30	James Jones	So
RB		Doug Kellom
TE	88	Wilber Marshall	Fr
QB		Mark Massey
TE	82	Mike Mularkey	So
QB		Larry Ochab
QB		Wayne Peace	Fr
OL		Dan Plonk
RB	39	Carl Prioleau	Sr
OL		John Redmond
C	59	Doug Smith	So
WR	19	Johnny Smith	Sr
OL		Jim Subers
OT	70	Joe Wickline	Sr
RB	44	Derald Williams	So
RB	31	Terry Williams	Sr
WR	7	Tyrone Young	So

Defense

Pos.	#	Name	Class
DL	53	Rod Brooks (C)	Sr
DL	90	Val Brown	So
DE	87	Mike Clark	Sr
DL	61	Ron Coleman	Sr
DB		Ivory Curry
DL	66	Robin Fisher	Jr
DL	85	David Galloway	Jr
DB	43	Sonny Gilliam	So
DE	57	Tim Golden	Sr
S	20	Tim Groves	Sr
LB		Fernando Jackson
CB	24	Kyle Knight	So
DB		Tony Lilly
LB	51	David Little	Sr
DL		Dock Luckie
DB		Vito McKeever
DL	50	Yancey Sutton	Sr
CB	47	Bruce Vaughan	So
LB	95	Tom Weigmann	So

Special teams

Pos.	#	Name	Class
K	3	Brian Clark	Jr
P	4	Mark Dickert	Jr

Head coach

- Charley Pell

Coordinators/assistant coaches

- Mike Heimerdinger (GA)
- Vince Kendrick (RB)
- Mike Shanahan (OC)

Legend

- (C) Team captain
- (S) Suspended
- (I) Ineligible
- Injured
- Redshirt
