= 1980 Tennessee Volunteers football team =

American college football season

1980 Tennessee Volunteers football
- Conference: Southeastern Conference
- Record: 5–6 (3–3 SEC)
- Head coach: Johnny Majors (4th season)
- Offensive coordinator: Bill Pace (1st season)
- Defensive coordinator: Bobby Jackson (1st season)
- Captain: Jim Noonan
- Home stadium: Neyland Stadium

1980 Southeastern Conference football standings
	Conf.					Overall
Team	W		L		T	W		L		T
No. 1 Georgia $	6	–	0	–	0	12	–	0	–	0
No. 19 Mississippi State	5	–	1	–	0	9	–	3	–	0
No. 6 Alabama	5	–	1	–	0	10	–	2	–	0
LSU	4	–	2	–	0	7	–	4	–	0
Florida	4	–	2	–	0	8	–	4	–	0
Tennessee	3	–	3	–	0	5	–	6	–	0
Ole Miss	2	–	4	–	0	3	–	8	–	0
Kentucky	1	–	5	–	0	3	–	8	–	0
Auburn	0	–	6	–	0	5	–	6	–	0
Vanderbilt	0	–	6	–	0	2	–	9	–	0
$ – Conference champion; Rankings from AP Poll

The 1980 Tennessee Volunteers football team (variously "Tennessee", "UT" or the "Vols") represented the University of Tennessee in the 1980 NCAA Division I-A football season. Playing as a member of the Southeastern Conference (SEC), the team was led by head coach Johnny Majors, in his fourth year, and played their home games at Neyland Stadium in Knoxville, Tennessee. They finished the season with a record of five wins and six losses (5–6 overall, 3–3 in the SEC).

== Schedule ==
Date	Opponent	Site	TV	Result	Attendance	Source
September 6	No. 16 Georgia	Neyland Stadium; Knoxville, TN		L 15–16	95,288	
September 13	No. 5 USC*	Neyland Stadium; Knoxville, TN	ESPN	L 17–20	95,049	
September 20	Washington State*	Neyland Stadium; Knoxville, TN		W 35–23	93,520	
September 27	at No. 18 Auburn	Jordan–Hare Stadium; Auburn, AL (rivalry)		W 42–0	75,942	
October 11	at Georgia Tech*	Grant Field; Atlanta, GA (rivalry)		W 23–10	50,127	
October 18	No. 1 Alabama	Neyland Stadium; Knoxville, TN (Third Saturday in October)	ABC	L 0–27	96,748	
October 25	No. 12 Pittsburgh*	Neyland Stadium; Knoxville, TN		L 6–30	94,008	
November 1	Virginia*^{†}	Neyland Stadium; Knoxville, TN		L 13–16	94,333	
November 15	vs. Ole Miss	Liberty Bowl Memorial Stadium; Memphis, TN (rivalry)		L 9–20	50,033	
November 22	Kentucky	Neyland Stadium; Knoxville, TN (rivalry)		W 45–14	90,244	
November 29	at Vanderbilt	Dudley Field; Nashville, TN (rivalry)		W 51–13	31,100	
*Non-conference game; ^{†}Homecoming; Rankings from AP Poll released prior to the game

== Roster ==
1980 Tennessee Volunteers football team roster
Players
Coaches
Offense

Pos.	#	Name	Class
WR	26	Willie Gault	So
WR	28	Anthony Hancock	Jr
OT	78	Tim Irwin	Sr

Defense

Pos.	#	Name	Class
DB	40	Bill Bates	So
LB	50	Danny Spradlin	Sr
DE	92	Reggie White	Fr
DE	93	Mike Cofer	So

Special teams

Pos.	#	Name	Class
K	10	Alan Duncan	Sr
P	20	John Warren	So

Head coach

- Johnny Majors

Coordinators/assistant coaches

- Bill Pace – Offensive coordinator/quarterbacks/assistant head coach
- Doug Mathews – Running backs
- Bob Harrison – Wide receivers
- Phillip Fulmer – Offensive line
- Bobby Jackson – Defensive coordinator/linebackers
- Frank Emanuel – Defensive line
- John Julies – Defensive ends
- Dom Capers – Defensive backs

Legend

- (C) Team captain
- (S) Suspended
- (I) Ineligible
- Injured
- Redshirt

== Team players drafted into the NFL ==
Player	Position	Round	Pick	NFL club
Tim Irwin	Tackle	3	74	Minnesota Vikings
Danny Spradlin	Linebacker	5	137	Dallas Cowboys
Alan Duncan	Kicker	7	174	Philadelphia Eagles
Hubert Simpson	Running back	10	258	Cincinnati Bengals
Brad White	Nose tackle	12	310	Tampa Bay Buccaneers
