= 1980 LSU Tigers football team =

American college football season

1980 LSU Tigers football
- Conference: Southeastern Conference
- Record: 7–4 (4–2 SEC)
- Head coach: Jerry Stovall (1st season)
- Offensive coordinator: George Belu (2nd season)
- Defensive coordinator: Greg Williams (2nd season)
- Home stadium: Tiger Stadium

1980 Southeastern Conference football standings
	Conf.					Overall
Team	W		L		T	W		L		T
No. 1 Georgia $	6	–	0	–	0	12	–	0	–	0
No. 19 Mississippi State	5	–	1	–	0	9	–	3	–	0
No. 6 Alabama	5	–	1	–	0	10	–	2	–	0
LSU	4	–	2	–	0	7	–	4	–	0
Florida	4	–	2	–	0	8	–	4	–	0
Tennessee	3	–	3	–	0	5	–	6	–	0
Ole Miss	2	–	4	–	0	3	–	8	–	0
Kentucky	1	–	5	–	0	3	–	8	–	0
Auburn	0	–	6	–	0	5	–	6	–	0
Vanderbilt	0	–	6	–	0	2	–	9	–	0
$ – Conference champion; Rankings from AP Poll

The 1980 LSU Tigers football team represented Louisiana State University (LSU) as a member of the Southeastern Conference (SEC) during the 1980 NCAA Division I-A football season. Led by first-year head coach Jerry Stovall, the Tigers compiled an overall record of 7–4, with a mark of 4–2 in conference play, and finished tied for fourth in the SEC.

Bo Rein was hired November 30, 1979 after four seasons at North Carolina State as the successor to Charles McClendon, who compiled a 137–59–7 record in 18 seasons. Rein's tenure was cut short after only 42 days when he died in a plane crash January 10, 1980.

Stovall, a former LSU All-America, nine-year National Football League veteran with the St. Louis Cardinals and previously an assistant coach under McClendon, was approved as Rein's successor approximately 36 hours after the plane crash.

LSU was tied for first place in the Southeastern Conference following a Nov. 1 victory over Ole Miss, but subsequent one-sided road losses to Alabama and Mississippi State, plus an ugly September loss to Rice, led bowls to snub the Tigers (Florida, which lost 24-7 to LSU at home in October and tied the Tigers in the conference standings, was invited to a bowl).

LSU ended on a high note by drubbing bowl-bound Tulane, the Tigers' only win vs. the Green Wave between 1979 and 1982.

As of 2025, this is the last LSU team to finish with a winning record and not be invited to a bowl.

== Schedule ==
Date	Opponent	Site	Result	Attendance	Source
September 6	No. 13 Florida State*	Tiger Stadium; Baton Rouge, LA	L 0–16	77,535	
September 13	Kansas State*	Tiger Stadium; Baton Rouge, LA	W 21–0	75,405	
September 20	Colorado*	Tiger Stadium; Baton Rouge, LA	W 23–20	74,999	
September 27	at Rice*	Rice Stadium; Houston, TX	L 7–17	41,000	
October 4	at No. 19 Florida	Florida Field; Gainesville, FL (rivalry)	W 24–7	59,299	
October 11	Auburn^{†}	Tiger Stadium; Baton Rouge, LA (rivalry)	W 21–17	76,094	
October 18	at Kentucky	Commonwealth Stadium; Lexington, KY	W 17–10	57,800	
November 1	Ole Miss	Tiger Stadium; Baton Rouge, LA (rivalry)	W 38–16	71,422	
November 8	at No. 6 Alabama	Bryant–Denny Stadium; Tuscaloosa, AL (rivalry)	L 7–28	60,210	
November 15	at No. 19 Mississippi State	Mississippi Veterans Memorial Stadium; Jackson, MS (rivalry)	L 31–55	48,863	
November 22	Tulane*	Tiger Stadium; Baton Rouge, LA (Battle for the Rag)	W 24–7	69,248	
*Non-conference game; ^{†}Homecoming; Rankings from AP Poll released prior to the game

== Roster ==
1980 LSU Tigers football team roster
Players
Coaches
Offense

Pos.	#	Name	Class
QB	7	Alan Risher	So
WR	21	Tracy Porter	Sr
WR	32	Orlando McDaniel	Jr
RB	47	Hokie Gajan	Sr
TE	89	Greg LaFleur	Sr

Defense

Pos.	#	Name	Class
CB	4	Chris Hutchinson	So
CB	10	Frank Killeen	So
CB	11	James Britt	Jr
S	22	Chris Williams	Sr
NG	60	George Atyieh	Sr
LB	51	Albert Richardson	So
DE	70	Leonard Marshall	So
LB	94	Lyman White	Sr

Special teams

Pos.	#	Name	Class
K	5	David Johnston	Jr

Head coach

- Jerry Stovall

Coordinators/assistant coaches

- George Belu – Offensive coordinator/offensive line
- Bob Gatling – Quarterbacks
- Darrel Moody – Running backs
- Stephen Regan – Wide receivers
- Otis Washington – Offensive line
- Greg Williams – Defensive coordinator/defensive backs
- Pete Jenkins – Defensive line
- Bishop Harris – Outside linebackers
- Bobby Morrison – Inside linebackers

Legend

- (C) Team captain
- (S) Suspended
- (I) Ineligible
- Injured
- Redshirt

Roster
