= James Harbour =

American football player (born 1962)

No. 88
- Position: Wide receiver

Personal information
- Born: November 10, 1962 (age 63); Meridian, Mississippi, U.S.
- Listed height: 6 ft 1 in (1.85 m)
- Listed weight: 192 lb (87 kg)

Career information
- High school: Meridian
- College: Ole Miss
- NFL draft: 1985: 7th round, 173rd overall pick

Career history
- Indianapolis Colts (1986)

Career NFL statistics
- Receptions: 4
- Receiving yards: 46
- Stats at Pro Football Reference

James Harbour (born November 10, 1962) is an American former professional football player who was a wide receiver for the Indianapolis Colts of the National Football League (NFL) in 1986. He played college football for the Ole Miss Rebels. Harbour had four receptions for 46 yards with the Colts.
