= 1980 Alabama Crimson Tide football team =

American college football season

1980 Alabama Crimson Tide football

Cotton Bowl champion

Cotton Bowl, W 30–2 vs. Baylor
- Conference: Southeastern Conference

Ranking
- Coaches: No. 6
- AP: No. 6
- Record: 10–2 (5–1 SEC)
- Head coach: Bear Bryant (23rd season)
- Offensive coordinator: Mal Moore (6th season)
- Offensive scheme: Wishbone
- Defensive coordinator: Ken Donahue (7th season)
- Base defense: 5–2
- Captains: Major Ogilvie; Randy Scott
- Home stadium: Bryant–Denny Stadium; Legion Field

1980 Southeastern Conference football standings
	Conf.					Overall
Team	W		L		T	W		L		T
No. 1 Georgia $	6	–	0	–	0	12	–	0	–	0
No. 19 Mississippi State	5	–	1	–	0	9	–	3	–	0
No. 6 Alabama	5	–	1	–	0	10	–	2	–	0
LSU	4	–	2	–	0	7	–	4	–	0
Florida	4	–	2	–	0	8	–	4	–	0
Tennessee	3	–	3	–	0	5	–	6	–	0
Ole Miss	2	–	4	–	0	3	–	8	–	0
Kentucky	1	–	5	–	0	3	–	8	–	0
Auburn	0	–	6	–	0	5	–	6	–	0
Vanderbilt	0	–	6	–	0	2	–	9	–	0
$ – Conference champion; Rankings from AP Poll

The 1980 Alabama Crimson Tide football team (variously "Alabama", "UA" or "Bama") represented the University of Alabama in the 1980 NCAA Division I-A football season. It was the Crimson Tide's 86th overall and 47th season as a member of the Southeastern Conference (SEC). The team was led by head coach Bear Bryant, in his 23rd year, and played their home games at Bryant–Denny Stadium in Tuscaloosa and Legion Field in Birmingham, Alabama. They finished season with ten wins and two losses (10–2 overall, 5–1 in the SEC) and with a victory over Baylor in the Cotton Bowl.

A 6–3 loss to Mississippi State ended Alabama's school record 28-game winning streak and all-time SEC record 27-game conference winning streak, and was Alabama's first loss to Mississippi State since 1957. It also cost the Tide a share of the SEC championship, the first time since 1976 they failed to win the SEC. Despite surrendering 35 points to Ole Miss, the Alabama defense still allowed only 98 points for the entire season.

== Schedule ==
Date	Time	Opponent	Rank	Site	TV	Result	Attendance	Source
September 6	1:30 p.m.	Georgia Tech*	No. 2	Legion Field; Birmingham, AL (rivalry)		W 26–3	78,410	
September 20	1:30 p.m.	at Ole Miss (Note: Prior to the 1980 season, the SEC ruled if two SEC teams scheduled each other independently, and not through the conference office, the game would not count in SEC standings. As such, although both were members of the SEC, the Alabama–Ole Miss games in 1980 and 1981 did not count as conference games in the official SEC standings.)*	No. 1	Mississippi Veterans Memorial Stadium; Jackson, MS (rivalry)		W 59–35	50,686	
September 27	1:30 p.m.	Vanderbilt	No. 1	Bryant–Denny Stadium; Tuscaloosa, AL	ESPN	W 41–0	60,210	
October 4	1:30 p.m.	Kentucky	No. 1	Legion Field; Birmingham, AL	ESPN	W 45–0	78,400	
October 11	12:30 p.m.	at Rutgers*	No. 1	Giants Stadium; East Rutherford, NJ	ESPN	W 17–13	58,107	
October 18	2:30 p.m.	at Tennessee	No. 1	Neyland Stadium; Knoxville, TN (Third Saturday in October)	ABC	W 27–0	96,748	
October 25	1:30 p.m.	No. 20 Southern Miss*^{†}	No. 1	Bryant–Denny Stadium; Tuscaloosa, AL	ESPN	W 42–7	60,210	
November 1	1:30 p.m.	at Mississippi State	No. 1	Mississippi Veterans Memorial Stadium; Jackson, MS (rivalry)	ESPN	L 3–6	50,891	
November 8	1:30 p.m.	LSU	No. 6	Bryant–Denny Stadium; Tuscaloosa, AL (rivalry)	ESPN	W 28–7	60,210	
November 15	2:30 p.m.	No. 6 Notre Dame*	No. 5	Legion Field; Birmingham, AL	ABC	L 0–7	78,873	
November 29	1:30 p.m.	vs. Auburn	No. 9	Legion Field; Birmingham, AL (Iron Bowl)		W 34–18	78,549	
January 1, 1981	1:00 p.m.	vs. No. 6 Baylor*	No. 9	Cotton Bowl; Dallas, TX (Cotton Bowl)	CBS	W 30–2	74,281	
*Non-conference game; ^{†}Homecoming; Rankings from AP Poll released prior to the game; All times are in Central time

== Roster ==
1980 Alabama Crimson Tide football team roster
Players
Coaches
Offense

Pos.	#	Name	Class
G	62	Scott Allison	Sr
RB	33	Billy Jackson	Sr
QB	5	Don Jacobs	Sr

Defense

Pos.	#	Name	Class
LB	90	Tom Boyd	Jr
DT	47	Byron Braggs	Sr
DT	98	Jackie Cline	So
DB	9	Jim Bob Harris	Jr
LB	39	E.J. Junior	Sr
DB	23	Benny Perrin	Jr
DE	81	Mike Pitts	So
LB	50	Randy Scott	Sr

Special teams

Pos.	#	Name	Class

Head coach

- Bear Bryant

Coordinators/assistant coaches

Legend

- (C) Team captain
- (S) Suspended
- (I) Ineligible
- Injured
- Redshirt
