= 1980 Memphis State Tigers football team =

American college football season

1980 Memphis State Tigers football
- Conference: Independent
- Record: 2–9
- Head coach: Richard Williamson (6th season)
- Home stadium: Liberty Bowl Memorial Stadium

1980 NCAA Division I-A independents football records
	Conf.					Overall
Team	W		L		T	W		L		T
No. 2 Pittsburgh		–		–		11	–	1	–	0
Tennessee State		–		–		9	–	1	–	0
No. 5 Florida State		–		–		10	–	2	–	0
No. 8 Penn State		–		–		10	–	2	–	0
No. 9 Notre Dame		–		–		9	–	2	–	1
No. 18 Miami (FL)		–		–		9	–	3	–	0
Southern Miss		–		–		9	–	3	–	0
Navy		–		–		8	–	4	–	0
South Carolina		–		–		8	–	4	–	0
Virginia Tech		–		–		8	–	4	–	0
Boston College		–		–		7	–	4	–	0
Northeast Louisiana		–		–		7	–	4	–	0
Rutgers		–		–		7	–	4	–	0
UNLV		–		–		7	–	4	–	0
Tulane		–		–		7	–	5	–	0
Colgate		–		–		5	–	4	–	1
North Texas State		–		–		6	–	5	–	0
Villanova		–		–		6	–	5	–	0
West Virginia		–		–		6	–	6	–	0
Louisville		–		–		5	–	6	–	0
Richmond		–		–		5	–	6	–	0
Syracuse		–		–		5	–	6	–	0
East Carolina		–		–		4	–	7	–	0
Illinois State		–		–		4	–	7	–	0
Temple		–		–		4	–	7	–	0
Army		–		–		3	–	7	–	1
Holy Cross		–		–		3	–	8	–	0
Cincinnati		–		–		2	–	9	–	0
Memphis State		–		–		2	–	9	–	0
William & Mary		–		–		2	–	9	–	0
Georgia Tech		–		–		1	–	9	–	1
Rankings from AP Poll

The 1980 Memphis State Tigers football team represented Memphis State University (now known as the University of Memphis) as an independent during the 1980 NCAA Division I-A football season. In its sixth and final season under head coach Richard Williamson, the team compiled a 2–9 record and was outscored by a total of 255 to 115. The team played its home games at Liberty Bowl Memorial Stadium in Memphis, Tennessee.

The team's statistical leaders included Darrell Martin with 888 passing yards, Richard Williams with 438 rushing yards, Jerry Knowlton with 470 receiving yards, and Rusty Bennett with 35 points scored.

== Schedule ==
Date	Opponent	Site	Result	Attendance	Source
September 6	Mississippi State	Liberty Bowl Memorial Stadium; Memphis, TN	L 7–34	45,789	
September 13	at Ole Miss	Hemingway Stadium; Oxford, MS (rivalry)	L 7–61	41,412	
September 27	at Georgia Tech	Grant Field; Atlanta, GA	L 8–17	28,062	
October 4	Arkansas State	Liberty Bowl Memorial Stadium; Memphis, TN (Paint Bucket Bowl)	W 24–3	20,352	
October 11	at Louisville	Fairgournds Stadium; Louisville, KY (rivalry)	L 14–38	15,501	
October 18	North Texas State	Liberty Bowl Memorial Stadium; Memphis, TN	L 10–29		
October 25	Florida State	Liberty Bowl Memorial Stadium; Memphis, TN	L 3–24	28,778	
November 1	Vanderbilt^{†}	Liberty Bowl Memorial Stadium; Memphis, TN	L 10–14	18,422	
November 8	at Cincinnati	Nippert Stadium; Cincinnati, OH (rivalry)	L 10–14	7,117	
November 15	at Tulane	Louisiana Superdome; New Orleans, LA	L 16–21	33,184	
November 22	Wichita State	Liberty Bowl Memorial Stadium; Memphis, TN	W 6–0	10,069	
^{†}Homecoming
