= 1980 Kentucky Wildcats football team =

American college football season

1980 Kentucky Wildcats football
- Conference: Southeastern Conference
- Record: 3–8 (1–5 SEC)
- Head coach: Fran Curci (8th season)
- Home stadium: Commonwealth Stadium

1980 Southeastern Conference football standings
	Conf.					Overall
Team	W		L		T	W		L		T
No. 1 Georgia $	6	–	0	–	0	12	–	0	–	0
No. 19 Mississippi State	5	–	1	–	0	9	–	3	–	0
No. 6 Alabama	5	–	1	–	0	10	–	2	–	0
LSU	4	–	2	–	0	7	–	4	–	0
Florida	4	–	2	–	0	8	–	4	–	0
Tennessee	3	–	3	–	0	5	–	6	–	0
Ole Miss	2	–	4	–	0	3	–	8	–	0
Kentucky	1	–	5	–	0	3	–	8	–	0
Auburn	0	–	6	–	0	5	–	6	–	0
Vanderbilt	0	–	6	–	0	2	–	9	–	0
$ – Conference champion; Rankings from AP Poll

The 1980 Kentucky Wildcats football team represented the University of Kentucky in the Southeastern Conference (SEC) during the 1980 NCAA Division I-A football season. In their eighth season under head coach Fran Curci, the Wildcats compiled a 3–8 record (1–5 against SEC opponents), finished in eighth place in the SEC, and were outscored by their opponents, 280 to 167. The team played its home games in Commonwealth Stadium in Lexington, Kentucky.

The team's statistical leaders included Larry McCrimmon with 1,060 passing yards, Randy Brooks with 578 rushing yards, and Alan Watson with 536 receiving yards.

== Schedule ==
Date	Opponent	Site	Result	Attendance	Source
September 6	Utah State*	Commonwealth Stadium; Lexington, KY	W 17–10	57,900	
September 13	at No. 4 Oklahoma*	Oklahoma Memorial Stadium; Norman, OK	L 7–29	74,852	
September 20	Indiana*	Commonwealth Stadium; Lexington, KY (rivalry)	L 30–36	57,869	
September 27	Bowling Green*	Commonwealth Stadium; Lexington, KY	W 21–20	55,800	
October 4	at Alabama	Legion Field; Birmingham, AL	L 0–45	78,400	
October 18	LSU	Commonwealth Stadium; Lexington, KY	L 10–17	57,800	
October 25	No. 5 Georgia	Commonwealth Stadium; Lexington, KY	L 0–27	57,353	
November 1	at Tulane*	Louisiana Superdome; New Orleans, LA	L 22–24	42,139	
November 8	Vanderbilt	Commonwealth Stadium; Lexington, KY (rivalry)	W 31–10	54,522	
November 15	No. 20 Florida	Commonwealth Stadium; Lexington, KY (rivalry)	L 15–17	54,200	
November 22	at Tennessee	Neyland Stadium; Knoxville, TN (rivalry)	L 14–45	90,244	
*Non-conference game; Rankings from AP Poll released prior to the game

== Roster ==
1980 Kentucky Wildcats football team roster
Players
Coaches
Offense

Pos.	#	Name	Class
QB	7	Terry Henry
WR	11	Larry McCrimmon
QB	12	Randy Jenkins
QB	15	John Thomas Boyle
WR	16	Juan Portela
WR	20	Massie
WR	22	Kerry Baird
RB	23	Chris Jackson
RB	24	Gordon Jackson
FB	32	Rod Francis
RB	34	Henry Parks
FB	45	Randy Brooks
G	50	John Maddox
C	51	Ken Roark
OT	52	Richard Adams
OL	63	Johnson
OT	64	Corbin
C	65	Burford
C	67	Young
G	69	Bond
OL	70	Martin
G	73	Robert Cobb
C	74	Thomas
C	75	Stiles
G	76	Williams
OT	77	Smyth
OT	79	Mickey Cochran
TE	80	Jim Campbell
WR	82	Clark
TE	85	Mangas
SE	86	Watson

Defense

Pos.	#	Name	Class
DB	2	Venus Meaux
DB	4	Petty
DB	9	Richmond
DB	14	Beuhner
DB	19	Jacobs
DB	21	Grimsley
LB	27	J Jones
DB	28	Meers
DB	31	Motley
DB	35	B Johnson
DB	37	Greg Long
LB	38	Joe Freeman
DE	41	Ference
LB	42	Scott Schroeder
LB	44	Glenn Amerson
DE	44	Roe
LB	46	Dorazio
DE	48	Jacobs
LB	49	McClelland
LB	53	Ben Ansley
LB	54	Robert Byrd
NG	55	C Jones
LB	56	Marzan
L	58	Hasty
DE	59	Smith
DT	60	James Bowen	So
DL	61	Ronald Bojalad	Fr
DT	62	Craig Miller	So
DT	72	Tim Gooch
DT	78	Earl Wilson	Jr
DB	81	Eddie Simmons	Fr

Special teams

Pos.	#	Name	Class
PK	3
P	5	Chris Poulton
PK	17	Rick Strein

Head coach

- Fran Curci

Coordinators/assistant coaches

- Jon Mirilovich – Offensive coordinator
- Tom Turchetta – Offensive line coach
- Larry Kirksey – Wide receivers/tight ends coach
- Charlie McCullers – Offensive backs coach
- Charlie Bailey – Assistant Head Coach and Defensive coordinator
- Dan Coughlin – Defensive line coach
- Bill Glaser – Defensive ends coach
- George Catavolos – Defensive backs coach
- Mike Cassity – Assistant defensive backs coach

Legend

- (C) Team captain
- (S) Suspended
- (I) Ineligible
- Injured
- Redshirt

== Postseason ==
=== NFL draft ===
The following Wildcat drafted into the National Football League following the season.

Round	Pick	Player	Position	NFL team
9	233	Tim Gooch	Defensive tackle	Baltimore Colts
