= Kevin Donnalley (American football, born 1958) =

American football player and coach

Biographical details
- Born: January 17, 1958 (age 68); Warren, Ohio, U.S.

Playing career
- 1977–1980: North Dakota State
- 1981: New England Patriots
- Position: Defensive back

Coaching career (HC unless noted)
- 1985–1986: North Dakota State (DB)
- 1987–1991: Montana State (assistant)
- 1992–1993: Fort Lewis

Head coaching record
- Overall: 2–18

Kevin Dale Donnalley (born January 17, 1958) is an American former professional football player and college coach. He played as a defensive back for one season with the New England Patriots of the National Football League (NFL) in 1981. He served as the head football coach at Fort Lewis College from 1992 to 1993, compiling a record of 2–18.

== Head coaching record ==
Year	Team	Overall	Conference	Standing	Bowl/playoffs
Fort Lewis Raiders (Rocky Mountain Athletic Conference) (1992–1993)
1992	Fort Lewis	1–9	0–7	8th	
1993	Fort Lewis	1–9	0–7	8th	
Fort Lewis:		2–18	0–14		
Total:		2–18			
