= Paul Piurowski =

American football player (born 1959)

Profile
- Position: Linebacker

Personal information
- Born: March 16, 1959 (age 67); Sarasota, Florida, U.S.
- Listed height: 6 ft 2 in (1.88 m)
- Listed weight: 225 lb (102 kg)

Career information
- High school: Saratosa (FL)
- College: Florida State
- NFL draft: 1981: 8th round, 218th overall pick

Career history
- Dallas Cowboys (1981)*; Miami Dolphins (1981)*; New York Jets (1982)*; Tampa Bay Bandits (1983–1984)
- * Offseason or practice squad member only

Awards and highlights
- Second-team USFL All-League (1983)

Career USFL statistics
- Games played: 33

Paul Piurowski (born March 16, 1959) is an American former professional football linebacker in the United States Football League (USFL) for the Tampa Bay Bandits. He played college football at Florida State University.

== Early life ==
Piurowski attended Sarasota High School, where he practiced football and baseball. He was a starter at quarterback and strong safety. He received All-state honors as a senior.

Piurowski accepted a football scholarship from Florida State University to play as a strong safety. As a freshman, he was moved to linebacker and was a reserve player.

As a sophomore, he was named a starter at outside linebacker. Although he only played in 6 games because of a knee injury, he tallied 84 tackles (fourth on the team) and 2 forced fumbles.

As a junior, he registered 123 tackles (second on the team), 6 sacks, 2 forced fumbles and 2 interceptions (one returned for a touchdown), contributing to the team finishing with a perfect regular-season record (11–0).

As a senior, he posted 122 tackles (second on the team), 2 sacks and 3 forced fumbles. He also had what is considered one of the greatest plays in school history in the 18–14 win against No. 3 Nebraska. The number 16 ranked Seminoles battled back from a 14–3 deficit and scored 15 unanswered points. With 13 seconds left in the game, the Huskers drove to the Seminole's three-yard line and Piurowski (who had 18 tackles) sacked and forced a fumble from quarterback Jeff Quinn which was recovered by defensive tackle Gary Futch to secure the win. He had his appendix removed the week after the game, which forced him to miss 3 games.

He finished his college career with 340 tackles, 7 tackles for loss, 8 sacks, 2 interceptions and 8 forced fumbles. The school had a combined 39–8 record during his 4 seasons.

In 1989, he was inducted into the Florida State Athletics Hall of Fame.

== Professional career ==
=== Dallas Cowboys ===
Piurowski was selected by the Dallas Cowboys in the eighth round (218th overall) of the 1981 NFL draft. He was released on August 3.

=== Miami Dolphins ===
On August 5, 1981, he was signed as a free agent by the Miami Dolphins. He was cut on August 17. He was re-signed in 1982 and released on June 1.

=== New York Jets ===
On June 2, 1982, he was claimed off waivers by the New York Jets. He was released after failing his physical examination on July 27.

=== Tampa Bay Bandits ===
In 1983, he signed as a free agent with the Tampa Bay Bandits of the United States Football League. He was a starter at inside linebacker, led the team in tackles and received Second-team All-League honors. In 1984, he was limited with an arm injury. On August 29, 1985, he was acquired by the Jacksonville Bulls, but did not play in any game after the league folded.

== Personal life ==
Piurowski is one of 10 children, 5 played for Sarasota High School. His son Caz and his younger brother John also played at Florida State University.
