= 1980 Auburn Tigers football team =

American college football season

1980 Auburn Tigers football
- Conference: Southeastern Conference
- Record: 5–6 (0–6 SEC)
- Head coach: Doug Barfield (5th season)
- Defensive coordinator: P. W. Underwood (5th season)
- Home stadium: Jordan-Hare Stadium

1980 Southeastern Conference football standings
| | Conf. | | | | | Overall |
| Team | W | | L | | T | W | | L | | T |
|---|---|---|---|---|---|---|---|---|---|---|
| No. 1 Georgia $ | 6 | – | 0 | – | 0 | 12 | – | 0 | – | 0 |
| No. 19 Mississippi State | 5 | – | 1 | – | 0 | 9 | – | 3 | – | 0 |
| No. 6 Alabama | 5 | – | 1 | – | 0 | 10 | – | 2 | – | 0 |
| LSU | 4 | – | 2 | – | 0 | 7 | – | 4 | – | 0 |
| Florida | 4 | – | 2 | – | 0 | 8 | – | 4 | – | 0 |
| Tennessee | 3 | – | 3 | – | 0 | 5 | – | 6 | – | 0 |
| Ole Miss | 2 | – | 4 | – | 0 | 3 | – | 8 | – | 0 |
| Kentucky | 1 | – | 5 | – | 0 | 3 | – | 8 | – | 0 |
| Auburn | 0 | – | 6 | – | 0 | 5 | – | 6 | – | 0 |
| Vanderbilt | 0 | – | 6 | – | 0 | 2 | – | 9 | – | 0 |
$ – Conference champion; Rankings from AP Poll

The 1980 Auburn Tigers football team achieved an overall 5–6 record in their fifth year under head coach Doug Barfield and failed to win a single game in the SEC, losing all six games. The team was also serving its second year of probation.

A deep pall was cast over the season when legendary coach Ralph "Shug" Jordan died on July 17. Jordan coached the Tigers to a 176-83-6 record from 1951 to 1975, highlighted by the Associated Press national championship in 1957. Jordan's name was added to Auburn's stadium in 1973, the first coach to be honored while still active.

Auburn extended Doug Barfield's contract for the 1980 season. However, no head coach lasts very long at Auburn without beating arch-rival Alabama, which he failed to do in five attempts; he was dismissed as head coach following the 1980 season. During his tenure as head coach, Auburn "won 29 games in five seasons and produced 14 All-SEC and three All-American players." Doug Barfield compiled an overall record of 29–25–1 (.536) as head coach of the Auburn Tigers.

Three players were named to the All-SEC first team for 1980: running back James Brooks, defensive tackle Frank Warren, and offensive tackle George Stephenson.

== Schedule ==
| Date | Opponent | Rank | Site | Result | Attendance | Source |
|---|---|---|---|---|---|---|
| September 13 | at TCU* | No. 18 | Amon G. Carter Stadium; Fort Worth, TX | W 10–7 | 22,812 | |
| September 20 | Duke* | No. 19 | Jordan-Hare Stadium; Auburn, AL | W 35–28 | 57,742 | |
| September 27 | Tennessee | No. 18 | Jordan-Hare Stadium; Auburn, AL (rivalry) | L 0–42 | 75,942 | |
| October 4 | Richmond* | | Jordan-Hare Stadium; Auburn, AL | W 55–16 | 47,226 | |
| October 11 | at LSU | | Tiger Stadium; Baton Rouge, LA (rivalry) | L 17–21 | 76,094 | |
| October 18 | Georgia Tech* | | Jordan-Hare Stadium; Auburn, AL (rivalry) | W 17–14 | 57,950 | |
| October 25 | at Mississippi State | | Mississippi Veterans Memorial Stadium; Jackson, MS | L 21–24 | 40,822 | |
| November 1 | at Florida | | Florida Field; Gainesville, FL (rivalry) | L 10–21 | 63,274 | |
| November 8 | Southern Miss*^{†} | | Jordan-Hare Stadium; Auburn, AL | W 31–0 | 56,800 | |
| November 15 | No. 1 Georgia | | Jordan-Hare Stadium; Auburn, AL (rivalry) | L 21–31 | 74,900 | |
| November 29 | vs. No. 9 Alabama | | Legion Field; Birmingham, AL (Iron Bowl) | L 18–34 | 78,549 | |
*Non-conference game; ^{†}Homecoming; Rankings from AP Poll released prior to the game

== Roster ==
1980 Auburn Tigers football team roster
Players
Coaches
Offense

| Pos. | # | Name | Class |
|---|---|---|---|
| QB | 5 | Joe Sullivan | So |
| RB | 21 | James Brooks | Sr |
| FB | 22 | George Peoples | Jr |
| OT | 78 | Keith Uecker | Jr |
| WR | 82 | Byron Franklin | Sr |

Defense

| Pos. | # | Name | Class |
|---|---|---|---|
| DT | 66 | Frank Warren | Sr |
| DE | 99 | Edmund Nelson | Jr |

Special teams

| Pos. | # | Name | Class |

Head coach

- Doug Barfield

Coordinators/assistant coaches

Legend

- (C) Team captain
- (S) Suspended
- (I) Ineligible
- Injured
- Redshirt

Roster
