= Rick Trocano =

American football player (born 1959)

No. 12
- Position: Quarterback

Personal information
- Born: April 4, 1959 (age 67); Cleveland, Ohio, U.S.
- Listed height: 6 ft 0 in (1.83 m)
- Listed weight: 188 lb (85 kg)

Career information
- High school: Brooklyn (Brooklyn, Ohio)
- College: Pittsburgh
- NFL draft: 1981: 11th round, 292nd overall pick

Career history
- Pittsburgh Steelers (1981)*; Cleveland Browns (1981–1983)
- * Offseason or practice squad member only
- Stats at Pro Football Reference

Fredrick Charles Trocano (born April 4, 1959) is an American former professional football player who was a quarterback for the Cleveland Browns of the National Football League (NFL). He was selected 292nd overall by the Pittsburgh Steelers in the 11th round of the 1981 NFL draft. He played college football for the Pittsburgh Panthers.
