= Tyrone Young =

American football player (1960–2015)

No. 89
- Position: Wide receiver

Personal information
- Born: April 29, 1960; Ocala, Florida, U.S.
- Died: October 15, 2015 (aged 55); San Diego, California, U.S.
- Listed height: 6 ft 6 in (1.98 m)
- Listed weight: 190 lb (86 kg)

Career information
- High school: Ocala (FL) Forest
- College: Florida
- NFL draft: 1983: undrafted

Career history
- New Orleans Saints (1983–1984)

Career NFL statistics
- Receptions: 36
- Receiving yards: 682
- Touchdowns: 6
- Stats at Pro Football Reference

Tyrone Donnive Young (April 29, 1960 – October 15, 2015) was an American college and professional football player who was a wide receiver in the National Football League (NFL) for two seasons during the 1980s. Young played college football for the University of Florida, and thereafter, he played professionally for the NFL's New Orleans Saints.

== Early life ==
Young was born in Ocala, Florida in 1960. He attended Forest High School in Ocala, and he was the quarterback for the Forest Wildcats high school football team. Young led the Wildcats to back-to-back Florida state football championships in 1975 and 1976.

== College career ==
Young accepted an athletic scholarship to attend the University of Florida in Gainesville, Florida, where he played for coach Doug Dickey and coach Charley Pell's Florida Gators football teams from 1978 to 1982. The Gators coaching staff decided to red-shirt him as a true freshman in 1978, but he subsequently worked his way up the depth chart to briefly become the Gators' starting quarterback. He subsequently changed positions to wide receiver and was paired with another converted quarterback, Cris Collinsworth, as the Gators' star flankers. During Young's sophomore season in 1980, he was a member of the Gators team that posted the biggest one-year turnaround in the history of NCAA Division I football—from 0–10–1 in 1979 to an 8–4 bowl team in 1980. Memorably, Young caught ten passes for 183 yards against the Georgia Bulldogs in 1980, which remains the eighth best single-game performance by a Gators wide receiver He also caught a fifty-one-yard touchdown reception against the Florida State Seminoles in 1981.

Young graduated from the University of Florida with a bachelor's degree in 1988.

== Professional career ==
The New Orleans Saints signed Young as an undrafted free agent in 1983, and he played for the Saints in 1983 and 1984. He saw limited action in his rookie season, but had almost 600 yards receiving as a second-year pro. In his two NFL seasons, Young played in thirty-two games and had thirty-six receptions for 682 yards and six touchdowns.

== Death ==
Young died on October 15, 2015, in San Diego, California from multiple myeloma, which was first diagnosed in 2004. He was 55 years old.

== See also ==
- List of New Orleans Saints players
- List of University of Florida alumni
