= 1980 Mississippi State Bulldogs football team =

American college football season

1980 Mississippi State Bulldogs football

Sun Bowl, L 17–31 vs. Nebraska
- Conference: Southeastern Conference

Ranking
- AP: No. 19
- Record: 9–3 (5–1 SEC)
- Head coach: Emory Bellard (2nd season)
- Defensive coordinator: Melvin Robertson (2nd season)
- Home stadium: Scott Field; Mississippi Veterans Memorial Stadium

1980 Southeastern Conference football standings
	Conf.					Overall
Team	W		L		T	W		L		T
No. 1 Georgia $	6	–	0	–	0	12	–	0	–	0
No. 19 Mississippi State	5	–	1	–	0	9	–	3	–	0
No. 6 Alabama	5	–	1	–	0	10	–	2	–	0
LSU	4	–	2	–	0	7	–	4	–	0
Florida	4	–	2	–	0	8	–	4	–	0
Tennessee	3	–	3	–	0	5	–	6	–	0
Ole Miss	2	–	4	–	0	3	–	8	–	0
Kentucky	1	–	5	–	0	3	–	8	–	0
Auburn	0	–	6	–	0	5	–	6	–	0
Vanderbilt	0	–	6	–	0	2	–	9	–	0
$ – Conference champion; Rankings from AP Poll

The 1980 Mississippi State Bulldogs football team represented Mississippi State University during the 1980 NCAA Division I-A football season. The season is best known for a win over then-#1 Alabama, often considered to be the greatest win in school history.

== Schedule ==
Date	Opponent	Rank	Site	TV	Result	Attendance	Source
September 6	at Memphis State*		Liberty Bowl Memorial Stadium; Memphis, TN		W 34–7	45,789	
September 13	Louisiana Tech*		Scott Field; Starkville, MS		W 31–11	32,812	
September 20	at Vanderbilt		Dudley Field; Nashville, TN		W 24–14	29,300	
September 27	at Florida		Florida Field; Gainesville, FL		L 15–21	56,225	
October 4	at Illinois*		Memorial Stadium; Champaign, IL		W 28–21	60,889	
October 11	Southern Miss*		Scott Field; Starkville, MS		L 14–42	36,211	
October 18	at No. 18 Miami (FL)*		Miami Orange Bowl; Miami, FL		W 34–31	17,806	
October 25	Auburn		Mississippi Veterans Memorial Stadium; Jackson, MS		W 24–21	40,822	
November 1	No. 1 Alabama		Mississippi Veterans Memorial Stadium; Jackson, MS (rivalry)		W 6–3	50,891	
November 15	LSU	No. 19	Mississippi Veterans Memorial Stadium; Jackson, MS (rivalry)		W 55–31	48,863	
November 22	vs. Ole Miss	No. 17	Mississippi Veterans Memorial Stadium; Jackson, MS (Egg Bowl)		W 19–14	62,520	
December 27	vs. No. 8 Nebraska*	No. 17	Sun Bowl; El Paso, TX (Sun Bowl)	CBS	L 17–31	34,723	
*Non-conference game; Rankings from AP Poll released prior to the game

== Personnel ==
1980 Mississippi State Bulldogs football team roster
Players
Coaches
Offense

Pos.	#	Name	Class
QB	12	Tony Black	Sr
QB	13	John Bond	Fr
WR	18	James Otis Doss	Sr
G	63	Matt Edwards	Sr
WR	21	David Ellis	Sr
OL		Ronman Grace
RB	26	Michael Haddix	So
OL		Wayne Harris
C	58	Kent Hull	So
RB		Donald Ray King
RB		Danny Knight
RB	33	Henry Koontz	Fr
OT	71	Alan Massey	Sr
WR	88	Mardye McDole	Sr
OL		Mike McDonald
QB	14	Robby Mink	Jr
QB	1	Tim Parenton	Fr
WR		Jerry Price
RB		Lamar Windham
RB	32	George Wonsley	Fr
WR	8	Glen Young	So

Defense

Pos.	#	Name	Class
DL	96	Eamie Barnes	So
DB	9	Dwayne Brown	Sr
DE	79	Glen Collins	Jr
LB	99	Johnie Cooks	Jr
LB	93	Don Edwards	Sr
DB	24	Lawrence Evans	So
DB		Rob Fesmire
DB	20	Larry Friday	Sr
DL		Ricky George
DL		Billy Jackson
DB	36	Willie Jackson	Sr
DB		Steve Johnson
DL	98	Tyrone Keys	Sr
LB		Rusty Martin
DL		Mike McEnany
LB	17	John Miller	So
SS	31	Don Nelson	Sr
LB	52	Curtis Stowers	So
DB	4	Greg Williams	So

Special teams

Pos.	#	Name	Class
K, P	7	Dana Moore	So
K		Bob Morgan

Head coach

- Emory Bellard

Coordinators/assistant coaches

Legend

- (C) Team captain
- (S) Suspended
- (I) Ineligible
- Injured
- Redshirt

== Game summaries ==
=== vs Ole Miss ===
Ole Miss Rebels (3–7) vs. #17 Mississippi State Bulldogs (8–2)

Quarter	1	2	3	4	Total
Mississippi St	10	0	3	6	19
Ole Miss	0	7	0	7	14

at Mississippi Veterans Memorial Stadium, Jackson, Mississippi

- Date: November 22, 1980
- Game weather: Rain
- Game attendance: 62,520

Team	Category	Player	Statistics
Mississippi St	Passing	John Bond	8/14, 151 Yds
Mississippi St	Rushing	John Bond	15 Rush, 163 Yds, TD
Mississippi St	Receiving		
Ole Miss	Passing		
Ole Miss	Rushing		
Ole Miss	Receiving		

Scoring summary

Quarter	Time	Drive			Team	Scoring information	Score	
Quarter	Time	Plays	Yards	TOP	Team	Scoring information	MSU	MISS
1					Mississippi St	24-yard field goal by Dana Moore	3	0
1					Mississippi St	John Bond 57-yard touchdown run, Dana Moore kick good	10	0
2			68		Ole Miss	Kinny Hopper 1-yard touchdown run, kick good	10	7
3					Mississippi St	32-yard field goal by Dana Moore	13	7
4	8:20				Ole Miss	Gino English 7-yard touchdown reception from John Fourcade, kick good	13	14
4	7:40				Mississippi St	Michael Haddix 10-yard touchdown run, kick no good	19	14
"TOP" = time of possession. For other American football terms, see Glossary of American football.							19	14
