= Wayne Peace =

American football player and coach (born 1961)

No. 15
- Position: Quarterback

Personal information
- Born: November 3, 1961 (age 65); Lakeland, Florida, U.S.
- Listed height: 6 ft 2 in (1.88 m)
- Listed weight: 215 lb (98 kg)

Career information
- High school: Lakeland
- College: Florida
- Supplemental draft: 1984: 1st round, 7th overall pick

Career history
- Tampa Bay Bandits (1984)

Awards and highlights
- Second-team All-SEC (1983)

Wayne Lamar Peace, Jr. (born November 3, 1961) is an American former college and professional football quarterback and current high school football coach in Lakeland, Florida.

He was born in Lakeland, Florida, and attended Lakeland High School, where he was an all-state football and basketball player. He was recruited by several top college programs and chose to accept a scholarship to play for coach Charley Pell at the University of Florida.

Peace became the Gators' starting quarterback just five games into his freshman season of 1980 when a knee injury to starter Bob Hewko propelled the rookie into the lineup, and he performed well enough to keep the starting job for most of the next three and a half seasons. Over his career at Florida, Peace lead the Gators to a 28-12-1 record, four bowl games, and their first ever top-10 ranking in the final AP Poll (No. 6 in 1983). He set several individual records as well; his career completion percentage (61.6%) was a school record and his 7,206 passing yards were second in school history when he graduated. During his junior season in 1982, Peace set an NCAA record for completion percentage (70.7%) which was broken by Steve Young the following year. Peace appeared on the cover of the September 13, 1982 cover of Sports Illustrated. In one of a series of articles written for The Gainesville Sun in 2006, the Sun sportswriters ranked him as No. 81 all-time greatest Gator of the first 100 years of Florida football. He was later inducted into the University of Florida Athletic Hall of Fame as a "Gator Great."

In the spring of 1984, Peace signed with the Tampa Bay Bandits of the United States Football League (USFL), who were coached by former Florida quarterback Steve Spurrier. Peace played in several games, sharing time under center with another Florida alumnus, John Reaves. After the league folded, Peace was drafted by the Cincinnati Bengals in the first round of the 1984 NFL Supplemental Draft of USFL and CFL Players, the second USFL quarterback picked after Steve Young. However, he was waived during preseason camp in August 1985. Peace tried out for several other National Football League (NFL) teams over the next two seasons, signing briefly with the Miami Dolphins and playing in preseason games with the San Diego Chargers, but he did not make a regular season roster and decided to retire from football in late 1986.

Peace graduated from the University of Florida with a bachelor's degree in marketing in 1986. In February 1987, he founded a State Farm insurance agency in his hometown of Lakeland. In 2006, while continuing to run his insurance agency, Peace became the quarterbacks coach for the high school team at Lakeland Christian School. In January 2011, he was named head football coach at the school, and has led his team to 6-5 and 7-3 records in his first two seasons.

== Personal ==
Peace is married to the former Melanie Britt, who is also from Lakeland. They have four children.

== See also ==
- List of University of Florida alumni
- List of University of Florida Athletic Hall of Fame members
