= 1980 UCLA Bruins football team =

American college football season

1980 UCLA Bruins football
- Conference: Pacific-10 Conference

Ranking
- Coaches: No. 14
- AP: No. 13
- Record: 9–2 (5–2 Pac-10)
- Head coach: Terry Donahue (5th season)
- Offensive coordinator: Homer Smith (3rd season)
- Defensive coordinator: Jed Hughes (4th season)
- Home stadium: Los Angeles Memorial Coliseum

1980 Pacific-10 Conference football standings
	Conf.					Overall
Team	W		L		T	W		L		T
No. 16 Washington $	6	–	1	–	0	9	–	3	–	0
No. 13 UCLA	5	–	2	–	0	9	–	2	–	0
No. 11 USC	4	–	2	–	1	8	–	2	–	1
Arizona State	5	–	3	–	0	7	–	4	–	0
Oregon	4	–	3	–	1	6	–	3	–	2
Stanford	3	–	4	–	0	6	–	5	–	0
Arizona	3	–	4	–	0	5	–	6	–	0
Washington State	3	–	4	–	0	4	–	7	–	0
California	3	–	5	–	0	3	–	8	–	0
Oregon State	0	–	8	–	0	0	–	11	–	0
$ – Conference champion; Rankings from AP Poll

The 1980 UCLA Bruins football team was an American football team that represented the University of California, Los Angeles during the 1980 NCAA Division I-A football season. In their fifth year under head coach Terry Donahue, the Bruins compiled a 9–2 record (5–2 Pac-10), finished in second place in the Pacific-10 Conference, and were ranked No. 13 in the final AP Poll.

UCLA's offensive leaders in 1980 were quarterback Tom Ramsey with 1,116 passing yards, running back Freeman McNeil with 1,105 rushing yards, and wide receiver Cormac Carney with 591 receiving yards.

== Schedule ==
Date	Opponent	Rank	Site	TV	Result	Attendance	Source
September 13	Colorado*		Los Angeles Memorial Coliseum; Los Angeles, CA		W 56–14	37,250	
September 20	at Purdue*		Ross–Ade Stadium; West Lafayette, IN		W 23–14	69,333	
September 27	Wisconsin*	No. 16	Los Angeles Memorial Coliseum; Los Angeles, CA		W 35–0	40,018	
October 4	at No. 2 Ohio State*	No. 11	Ohio Stadium; Columbus, OH	ABC	W 17–0	88,084	
October 11	No. 16 Stanford	No. 5	Los Angeles Memorial Coliseum; Los Angeles, CA (rivalry)		W 35–21	64,175	
October 25	at California	No. 3	California Memorial Stadium; Berkeley, CA (rivalry)		W 32–9	53,000	
November 1	at Arizona	No. 2	Arizona Stadium; Tucson, AZ		L 17–23	42,876	
November 8	Oregon	No. 8	Los Angeles Memorial Coliseum; Los Angeles, CA		L 14–20	40,907	
November 15	at Arizona State	No. 17	Sun Devil Stadium; Tempe, AZ		W 23–14	65,640	
November 22	No. 12 USC	No. 18	Los Angeles Memorial Coliseum; Los Angeles, CA (Victory Bell)	ABC	W 20–17	83,491	
November 30	vs. Oregon State	No. 14	National Stadium; Tokyo, Japan (Mirage Bowl)	KTLA	W 34–3	80,000	
*Non-conference game; Rankings from AP Poll released prior to the game

== Game summaries ==
=== Colorado ===
Team	1	2	3	4	Total
Colorado	0	0	7	7	14
• UCLA	28	28	0	0	56

- Date: September 13
- Location: Los Angeles Memorial Coliseum, Los Angeles, CA
- Game attendance: 37,250

Scoring summary
Q1	UCLA	Ramsey 6 yard run (Johnson kick)	UCLA 7–0
Q1	UCLA	Townsell 15 yard pass from Ramsey (Johnson kick)	UCLA 14–0
Q1	UCLA	Ramsey 1 yard run (Johnson kick)	UCLA 21–0
Q1	UCLA	Penaranda 19 yard run (Johnson kick)	UCLA 28–0
Q2	UCLA	Schroeder 12 yard run (Reeves kick)	UCLA 35–0
Q2	UCLA	Penaranda 1 yard run (Potter kick)	UCLA 42–0
Q2	UCLA	D. Green 8 yard run (Reeves kick)	UCLA 49–0
Q2	UCLA	Nelson 2 yard run (Reeves kick)	UCLA 56–0
Q3	COL	Hawkins 9 yard run (Field kick)	UCLA 56–7
Q4	COL	Olander 25 yard pass from C. Davis (Field kick)	UCLA 56–14

=== At Ohio State ===
Team	1	2	3	4	Total
• UCLA	3	0	14	0	17
Ohio State	0	0	0	0	0

- Date: October 4
- Location: Ohio Stadium

=== USC ===
#12 USC Trojans (7–1–1) at #18 UCLA Bruins (7–2)

Quarter	1	2	3	4	Total
USC	3	0	7	7	17
UCLA	0	7	7	6	20

at Los Angeles Memorial Coliseum, Los Angeles, California

- Date: November 22, 1980
- Game attendance: 83,491
- Eugene Register-Guard, 1980 Nov 23.

Game information

First quarter

- USC – Eric Hipp 32-yard field goal. USC 3–0. Drive:

Second quarter

- UCLA – Freeman McNeil 6-yard run (Norm Johnson kick). UCLA 7–3. Drive: 80 yards.

Third quarter

- USC – Jeff Simmons 12-yard pass from Scott Tinsley (Eric Hipp kick), 12:05. USC 10–7. Drive:
- UCLA – Michael Brant 25-yard pass from Jay Schroeder (Norm Johnson kick). UCLA 14–10. Drive:

Fourth quarter

- USC – Marcus Allen 1-yard run (Eric Hipp kick), 12:33. USC 17–14. Drive: 10 plays, 43 yards.
- UCLA – Freeman McNeil 58-yard pass from Jay Schroeder (kick failed), 2:07. UCLA 20–17. Drive: 6 plays, 80 yards.

Top passers

- USC – Scott Tinsley – 15/27, 146 yards, TD, INT
- UCLA – Jay Schroeder – 9/11, 165 yards, 2 TD, INT

Top rushers

- USC – Marcus Allen – 37 rushes, 72 yards, TD
- UCLA – Freeman McNeil – 24 rushes, 111 yards, TD

Top receivers

- USC – Jeff Simmons – 5 receptions, 53 yards, TD
- UCLA – Freeman McNeil – 2 receptions, 74 yards, TD

Terry Donahue's first win versus USC

== Personnel ==
1980 UCLA Bruins football team roster
Players
Coaches
Offense

Pos.	#	Name	Class
WR	15	Michael Brant	Sr
RB	42	Frank Bruno	So
WR	83	Cormac Carney	So
OL	70	Gregg Charitiansen	Sr
WR	36	Ricky Coffman	Jr
WR	18	Willie Curran	Jr
TE	85	Ronnie DeBose	Sr
G	59	Dan Dufour	So
TE	90	James Forge	Jr
RB		Chester Goynes
RB		Daryl Green
G	77	Larry Lee	Sr
RB	24	Freeman McNeil	Sr
OT	79	Curt Mohl	Sr
RB	3	Kevin Nelson
C	51	Dave Otey	Jr
RB	22	Jairo Penaranda	Sr
QB	14	Tom Ramsey	So
QB	7	Jay Schroeder	So
OL	67	Luis Sharpe	Jr
G	66	John Tautolo	Sr
WR	26	JoJo Townsell	So
WR	30	Dokie Williams	So
TE	91	Tim Wrightman	Jr

Defense

Pos.	#	Name	Class
LB	39	Arthur Akers	Sr
DL		Mike Barbee
DB	29	Mike Durden	So
CB	5	Kenny Easley	Sr
DT	75	Irv Eatman	So
LB	98	Chris Elias	Sr
DE		Joe Gary	Jr
LB	41	Larry Hall	So
DL	40	Karl Morgan	So
DL		Martin Moss
LB	27	Blanchard Montgomery	So
LB	99	Brad Plummerons	Jr
LB	9	Avon Riley	Sr
DB	21	Lupe Sanchez	So
LB	44	Scott Stauch	Sr
SS	32	Tom Sullivan	So
DB	35	Jimmy Turner	So

Special teams

Pos.	#	Name	Class
K	8	Norm Johnson	Jr
P	37	Matt McFarland	Sr
K		Doug Reeves

Head coach

- Terry Donahue

Coordinators/assistant coaches

Legend

- (C) Team captain
- (S) Suspended
- (I) Ineligible
- Injured
- Redshirt

== Awards and honors ==
- Kenny Easley, S, All American (consensus), All-Conference Honor
- Irv Eatman, DT, All-Conference Honor
- Avon Riley, LB, All-Conference Honor
- Tim Wrightman, TE, All-Conference Honor
- Larry Lee, OG, All-Conference Honor

== Team players in the NFL ==
The following players were drafted into professional football following the season.

Player	Position	Round	Pick	Franchise
Freeman McNeil	Running back	1	3	New York Jets
Kenny Easley	Defensive back	1	4	Seattle Seahawks
Larry Lee	Guard	5	129	Detroit Lions
Avon Riley	Linebacker	9	243	Houston Oilers
Curt Mohl	Tackle	9	248	Oakland Raiders
Rob DeBose	Tight end	11	286	San Francisco 49ers
Jairo Penaranda	Running back	12	328	Los Angeles Rams

- Freeman McNeil, TB, All American, All-Conference Honor
