= 1980 Army Cadets football team =

American college football season

1980 Army Cadets football
- Conference: Independent
- Record: 3–7–1
- Head coach: Ed Cavanaugh (1st season)
- Captain: Stan March
- Home stadium: Michie Stadium

1980 NCAA Division I-A independents football records
	Conf.					Overall
Team	W		L		T	W		L		T
No. 2 Pittsburgh		–		–		11	–	1	–	0
Tennessee State		–		–		9	–	1	–	0
No. 5 Florida State		–		–		10	–	2	–	0
No. 8 Penn State		–		–		10	–	2	–	0
No. 9 Notre Dame		–		–		9	–	2	–	1
No. 18 Miami (FL)		–		–		9	–	3	–	0
Southern Miss		–		–		9	–	3	–	0
Navy		–		–		8	–	4	–	0
South Carolina		–		–		8	–	4	–	0
Virginia Tech		–		–		8	–	4	–	0
Boston College		–		–		7	–	4	–	0
Northeast Louisiana		–		–		7	–	4	–	0
Rutgers		–		–		7	–	4	–	0
UNLV		–		–		7	–	4	–	0
Tulane		–		–		7	–	5	–	0
Colgate		–		–		5	–	4	–	1
North Texas State		–		–		6	–	5	–	0
Villanova		–		–		6	–	5	–	0
West Virginia		–		–		6	–	6	–	0
Louisville		–		–		5	–	6	–	0
Richmond		–		–		5	–	6	–	0
Syracuse		–		–		5	–	6	–	0
East Carolina		–		–		4	–	7	–	0
Illinois State		–		–		4	–	7	–	0
Temple		–		–		4	–	7	–	0
Army		–		–		3	–	7	–	1
Holy Cross		–		–		3	–	8	–	0
Cincinnati		–		–		2	–	9	–	0
Memphis State		–		–		2	–	9	–	0
William & Mary		–		–		2	–	9	–	0
Georgia Tech		–		–		1	–	9	–	1
Rankings from AP Poll

The 1980 Army Cadets football team was an American football team that represented the United States Military Academy as an independent during the 1980 NCAA Division I-A football season. In their first season under head coach Ed Cavanaugh, the Cadets compiled a 3–7–1 record and were outscored by their opponents 295 to 204. In the annual Army–Navy Game, the Cadets lost to Navy, 33 to 6.

== Schedule ==
Date	Time	Opponent	Site	TV	Result	Attendance	Source
September 13		Holy Cross	Michie Stadium; West Point, NY		W 28–7	28,043	
September 20		California	Michie Stadium; West Point, NY		W 26–19	32,575	
September 27		at Washington State	Martin Stadium; Pullman, WA		L 18–31	24,213	
October 4		Harvard	Michie Stadium; West Point, NY		L 10–15	38,479	
October 11		Lehigh	Michie Stadium; West Point, NY		T 24–24	32,850	
October 18		at No. 5 Notre Dame	Notre Dame Stadium; Notre Dame, IN (rivalry)		L 3–30	59,075	
October 25		at Boston College	Alumni Stadium; Chestnut Hill, MA		L 14–30	23,000	
November 1		Rutgers	Michie Stadium; West Point, NY		L 21–37	34,441	
November 8		Air Force	Michie Stadium; West Point, NY (Commander-in-Chief's Trophy)		W 47–24	37,653	
November 15	1:30 p.m.	No. 8 Pittsburgh	Michie Stadium; West Point, NY		L 7–45	31,150	
November 29	3:45 p.m.	vs. Navy	Veterans Stadium; Philadelphia, PA (Army–Navy Game)	ABC	L 6–33	70,338	
Rankings from AP Poll released prior to the game; All times are in Eastern time

== Season summary ==
=== at Washington State ===
Army Cadets (2–0) at Washington State Cougars (1–1)

Quarter	1	2	3	4	Total
Army	0	10	2	6	18
Washington St	14	7	7	3	31

at Martin Stadium, Pullman, Washington

- Date: September 27, 1980
- Game attendance: 24,321

Game information

First quarter

- WSU – Robert Williams 4-yard run (Mike DeSanto kick). Washington St 7–0. Drive: 13 plays, 78 yards.
- WSU – Samoa Samoa 21-yard run (Mike DeSanto kick). Washington St 14–0.

Second quarter

- WSU – Mike Washington 2-yard run (Mike DeSanto kick). Washington St 21–0.
- ARMY – Mike Fahnestock 15-yard run (Dave Aucoin kick). Washington St 21–7.
- ARMY – Dave Aucoin 27-yard field goal. Washington St 21–10.

Third quarter

- WSU – Samoa Samoa 28-yard run (Mike DeSanto kick). Washington St 28–10.
- ARMY – Safety, Tim Harris tackled in end zone. Washington St 28–12.

Fourth quarter

- WSU – Mike DeSanto 26-yard field goal. Washington St 31–12.
- ARMY – Bobby Vicci 6-yard run (run failed). Washington St 31–18.

Top passers

- ARMY – Jerryl Bennett – 19/37, 262 yards, 3 INT
- WSU – Samoa Samoa – 4/10, 80 yards

Top rushers

- ARMY – Gerald Walker – 20 rushes, 122 yards
- WSU – Tim Harris – 12 rushes, 83 yards

Top receivers

- ARMY – Mike Fahnestock – 6 receptions, 128 yards
- WSU – Jim Whatley – 2 receptions, 63 yards

== Personnel ==
1980 Army Cadets football team roster
Players
Coaches
Offense

Pos.	#	Name	Class
QB	17	Brian Allem	Fr
RB	20	Rob Bauder	Jr
QB	16	Jerryl Bennett	Jr
OT	77	Steve Carter	Sr
RB	29	Andre Cuerington	Fr
QB	11	T.D. Decker	Sr
C	52	Dan Enright	Jr
WR	88	Mike Fahnestock	Sr
RB	45	Dino Harris	Jr
FB	39	Rob Heather	Jr
G	62	Matt Herholtz	Sr
WR	37	Glenn Hoy	So
WR	38	Kevin Kullander	Jr
TE	85	Mark McKearn	Sr
OT	76	Jay Meyer	Jr
WR	82	Larry Pruitt	So
G	73	Jim Sharman	Jr
TE	90	Gene Skinner	Jr
FB	32	Bobby Vicci	Sr
G	79	Rick Waddell	So
FB	33	Warren Waldorff	So
HB	40	Gerald Walker	So
OT	71	Bill Wilhelm	Sr
RB	31	Todd Williams	Fr

Defense

Pos.	#	Name	Class
DE	89	Larry Carroll	Fr
DB	23	Jeff Cook	Sr
DB	22	Rich Dauch	So
DT	69	Kevin Dodson	Jr
LB	53	John Garrison	Jr
LB	48	Steve Gerras	Jr
LB	51	Dan Kessler	So
DE	87	Mark Lingo	So
DB	19	Dale Love	Jr
DT	72	Stan March (C)	Sr
LB	44	Al Mazyck	Sr
DB	27	Tom Morgan	So
DB	24	Kevin Murphy	So
DB	20	Scott Sherwood	So
LB	80	Scott Stangle	Sr
DT	85	Kevin Streets	Sr
DE	59	Charles Swanson	Jr
LB	43	Pat Sweeney	Jr
LB	92	Darryl Williams	So
DB	18	Mike Williams	So
LB	86	Bob Wood	So
DB	28	Chris Zawie	So
LB	49	Frank Zito	So

Special teams

Pos.	#	Name	Class
K	95	Dave Aucoin	Jr
P	97	Joe Sartiano	Fr

Head coach

- Ed Cavanaugh

Coordinators/assistant coaches

Legend

- (C) Team captain
- (S) Suspended
- (I) Ineligible
- Injured
- Redshirt
