= 1980 Washington State Cougars football team =

American college football season

1980 Washington State Cougars football
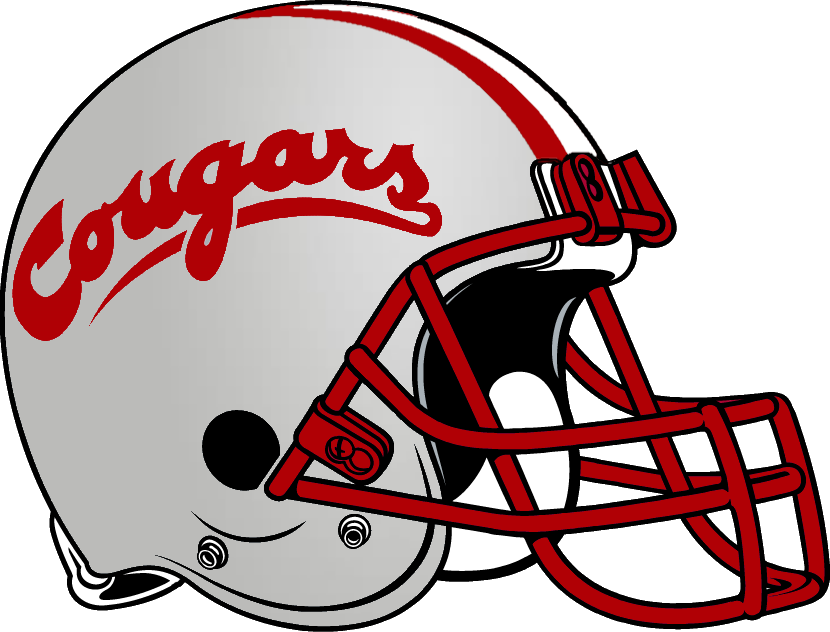
- Conference: Pacific-10 Conference
- Record: 4–7 (3–4 Pac-10)
- Head coach: Jim Walden (3rd season)
- Offensive coordinator: Pat Ruel (1st season)
- Defensive coordinator: Bob Padilla (1st season)
- Captains: Samoa Samoa; Allan Kennedy; Brian Flones; Scott Pelluer
- Home stadium: Martin Stadium; Joe Albi Stadium

1980 Pacific-10 Conference football standings
	Conf.					Overall
Team	W		L		T	W		L		T
No. 16 Washington $	6	–	1	–	0	9	–	3	–	0
No. 13 UCLA	5	–	2	–	0	9	–	2	–	0
No. 11 USC	4	–	2	–	1	8	–	2	–	1
Arizona State	5	–	3	–	0	7	–	4	–	0
Oregon	4	–	3	–	1	6	–	3	–	2
Stanford	3	–	4	–	0	6	–	5	–	0
Arizona	3	–	4	–	0	5	–	6	–	0
Washington State	3	–	4	–	0	4	–	7	–	0
California	3	–	5	–	0	3	–	8	–	0
Oregon State	0	–	8	–	0	0	–	11	–	0
$ – Conference champion; Rankings from AP Poll

The 1980 Washington State Cougars football team was an American football team that represented Washington State University in the Pacific-10 Conference (Pac-10) during the 1980 NCAA Division I-A football season. In their third season under head coach Jim Walden, the Cougars compiled a 4–7 record (3–4 in Pac-10, tied for sixth), and outscored their opponents 287 to 271.

The team's statistical leaders included Samoa Samoa with 1,668 passing yards, Tim Harris with 801 rushing yards, and Jim Whatley with 433 receiving yards.

This year's Apple Cup is the most recent played at Joe Albi Stadium in Spokane; since 1982, the Cougar home games in the series (even-numbered years) have been held on campus at Martin Stadium. From 1950 through 1980 (except 1954 in Pullman), the Cougars were 3–12 (.200) in Spokane Apple Cups, while winning five in Seattle.

== Schedule ==
Date	Opponent	Site	TV	Result	Attendance	Source
September 13	San Jose State*	Joe Albi Stadium; Spokane, WA	ABC (regional)	L 26–31	18,153	
September 20	at Tennessee*	Neyland Stadium; Knoxville, TN		L 23–35	93,520	
September 27	Army*	Martin Stadium; Pullman, WA		W 31–18	24,213	
October 4	Pacific (CA)*	Martin Stadium; Pullman, WA		L 22–24	18,123	
October 11	at Arizona State	Sun Devil Stadium; Tempe, AZ		L 21–27	64,333	
October 18	at Arizona	Arizona Stadium; Tucson, AZ		W 38–14	47,132	
October 25	Stanford	Martin Stadium; Pullman, WA		L 34–48	30,371	
November 1	at Oregon	Autzen Stadium; Eugene, OR		L 10–20	30,083	
November 8	Oregon State^{†}	Martin Stadium; Pullman, WA		W 28–7	15,651	
November 15	at California	California Memorial Stadium; Berkeley, CA		W 31–17	30,000	
November 22	No. 16 Washington	Joe Albi Stadium; Spokane, WA (Apple Cup)	ABC (regional)	L 23–30	34,557	
*Non-conference game; ^{†}Homecoming; Rankings from AP Poll released prior to the game

== Season summary ==
=== Army ===
Army Cadets (2–0) at Washington State Cougars (1–1)

Quarter	1	2	3	4	Total
Army	0	10	2	6	18
Washington St	14	7	7	3	31

at Martin Stadium, Pullman, Washington

- Date: September 27, 1980
- Game attendance: 24,321

Game information

First quarter

- WSU – Robert Williams 4-yard run (Mike DeSanto kick). Washington St 7–0. Drive: 13 plays, 78 yards.
- WSU – Samoa Samoa 21-yard run (Mike DeSanto kick). Washington St 14–0.

Second quarter

- WSU – Mike Washington 2-yard run (Mike DeSanto kick). Washington St 21–0.
- ARMY – Mike Fahnestock 15-yard run (Dave Aucoin kick). Washington St 21–7.
- ARMY – Dave Aucoin 27-yard field goal. Washington St 21–10.

Third quarter

- WSU – Samoa Samoa 28-yard run (Mike DeSanto kick). Washington St 28–10.
- ARMY – Safety, Tim Harris tackled in end zone. Washington St 28–12.

Fourth quarter

- WSU – Mike DeSanto 26-yard field goal. Washington St 31–12.
- ARMY – Bobby Vicci 6-yard run (run failed). Washington St 31–18.

Top passers

- ARMY – Jerryl Bennett – 19/37, 262 yards, 3 INT
- WSU – Samoa Samoa – 4/10, 80 yards

Top rushers

- ARMY – Gerald Walker – 20 rushes, 122 yards
- WSU – Tim Harris – 12 rushes, 83 yards

Top receivers

- ARMY – Mike Fahnestock – 6 receptions, 128 yards
- WSU – Jim Whatley – 2 receptions, 63 yards

== Personnel ==
1980 Washington State Cougars football team roster
Players
Coaches
Offense

Pos.	#	Name	Class
TE	89	Pat Beach	Jr
RB	20	Al Bowens	So
QB	9	Clete Casper	So
G	71	John Dreyer	So
C	67	Eugene Emerson	Sr
WR	87	Paul Escalera	Jr
RB		Doug Hall
RB	43	Tim Harris	So
TE		Rick Hedlund
OT	75	Steve Johnson	Sr
WR	88	Jeff Keller	Jr
OT	72	Allan Kennedy (C)	Sr
OT	77	John Little	Sr
RB	23	Mike Martin	Jr
G	63	Gary Patrick	So
WR		Jeff Poppe
OL		Greg Porter
RB		Tom Ramberg
QB	11	Samoa Samoa (C)	Sr
TE		Tom Spencer
G	56	Greg Sykes	Sr
QB		Ricky Turner
RB	26	Mike Washington	Sr
WR	21	Jim Whatley	Sr
WR		Chris Williams
RB	42	Robert Williams	So
WR	22	Mike Wilson	Sr

Defense

Pos.	#	Name	Class
LB	96	Lee Blakeney	Fr
CB	30	Nate Bradley	Jr
DT	95	Ken Collins	Jr
DT	73	Matt Elisara	Jr
LB	34	Ken Emmil	So
CB	41	Jeff Files	Jr
NG	61	Brian Flones (C)	Sr
CB	6	Bill Gribble	Jr
LB		Dirk Hunter
DL		Ken Jacobsen
LB	47	Scott Pelluer (C)	Sr
LB	38	Melvin Sanders	Sr
S	48	Peter Shaw	Jr
LB	10	Brian Sickler	Sr
S	28	Paul Sorensen	Jr
DB		Joe Taylor
S	5	Gary Teague	Sr
DE	62	Mike Walker	Sr
S	44	John West	Jr
LB		Brent White

Special teams

Pos.	#	Name	Class
P	16	Tim Davey	Jr
K	1	Mike DeSanto	Sr

Head coach

- Jim Walden (3rd year)

Coordinators/assistant coaches

- Dave Elliott (LB)
- Gary Gagnon (RB)
- Lindsay Hughes (OLB)
- Rich Glover (DL)
- Steve Morton (TE)
- Bob Padilla (DC, DL)
- Pat Ruel (OC, OL)
- Ken Woody (WR)
- Harold Wheeler (DB)

Legend

- (C) Team captain
- (S) Suspended
- (I) Ineligible
- Injured
- Redshirt

== NFL draft ==
Five Cougars were selected in the 1981 NFL draft.

Player	Position	Round	Overall	Franchise
Scott Pelluer	LB	4	91	Dallas Cowboys
Samoa Samoa	RB/QB	9	230	Cincinnati Bengals
Jim Whatley	WR	9	236	Seattle Seahawks
Mike Wilson	WR	9	246	Dallas Cowboys
Allan Kennedy	T	10	267	Washington Redskins
