= 1980 California Golden Bears football team =

American college football season

1980 California Golden Bears football
- Conference: Pacific-10 Conference
- Record: 3–8 (3–5 Pac-10)
- Head coach: Roger Theder (3rd season)
- Offensive coordinator: Al Saunders
- Defensive coordinator: Gunther Cunningham (2nd season)
- Home stadium: California Memorial Stadium

1980 Pacific-10 Conference football standings
	Conf.					Overall
Team	W		L		T	W		L		T
No. 16 Washington $	6	–	1	–	0	9	–	3	–	0
No. 13 UCLA	5	–	2	–	0	9	–	2	–	0
No. 11 USC	4	–	2	–	1	8	–	2	–	1
Arizona State	5	–	3	–	0	7	–	4	–	0
Oregon	4	–	3	–	1	6	–	3	–	2
Stanford	3	–	4	–	0	6	–	5	–	0
Arizona	3	–	4	–	0	5	–	6	–	0
Washington State	3	–	4	–	0	4	–	7	–	0
California	3	–	5	–	0	3	–	8	–	0
Oregon State	0	–	8	–	0	0	–	11	–	0
$ – Conference champion; Rankings from AP Poll

The 1980 California Golden Bears football team was an American football team that represented the University of California, Berkeley during the 1980 NCAA Division I-A football season. Under head coach Roger Theder, the team compiled an overall record of 3–8 and 3–5 in conference.

== Schedule ==
Date	Opponent	Site	Result	Attendance	Source
September 13	vs. Florida*	Tampa Stadium; Tampa, FL	L 13–41	41,388	
September 20	at Army*	Michie Stadium; West Point, NY	L 19–26	32,575	
September 27	Arizona	California Memorial Stadium; Berkeley, CA	L 24–31	41,000	
October 4	at Michigan*	Michigan Stadium; Ann Arbor, MI	L 13–38	104,621	
October 11	Oregon	California Memorial Stadium; Berkeley, CA	W 31–6	35,000	
October 18	Oregon State	California Memorial Stadium; Berkeley, CA	W 27–6	30,454	
October 25	No. 3 UCLA	California Memorial Stadium; Berkeley, CA (rivalry)	L 9–32	53,000	
November 1	at No. 7 USC	Los Angeles Memorial Coliseum; Los Angeles, CA	L 7–60	55,658	
November 8	at Arizona State	Sun Devil Stadium; Tempe, AZ	L 6–34	62,228	
November 15	Washington State	California Memorial Stadium; Berkeley, CA	L 17–31	30,000	
November 22	Stanford	California Memorial Stadium; Berkeley, CA (Big Game)	W 28–23	78,258	
*Non-conference game; Rankings from AP Poll released prior to the game

== Game summaries ==
=== Stanford ===
Stanford Cardinal (6–4) at California Golden Bears (2–8)

Quarter	1	2	3	4	Total
Stanford	7	0	0	16	23
California	7	14	0	7	28

at California Memorial Stadium, Berkeley, California

- Date: November 22
- Game attendance: 78,258

Game information

First quarter

- CAL – John Tuggle 15-yard run (Mick Luckhurst kick). Cal 7–0. Drive:
- STAN – Vincent White 1-yard run (Ken Naber kick). Tie 7–7. Drive:

Second quarter

- CAL – Tyrone Portee 24-yard pass from J Torchio (Mick Luckhurst kick). Cal 14–7. Drive:
- CAL – John Tuggle 2-yard run (Mick Luckhurst kick). Cal 21–7. Drive:

Third quarter

- No scoring

Fourth quarter

- STAN – Vincent White 32-yard pass from John Elway (Ken Naber kick). Cal 21–14. Drive:
- STAN – Vincent White 4-yard run (Ken Naber kick). Tie 21–21. Drive:
- CAL – J Torchio 3-yard run (Mick Luckhurst kick). Cal 28–21. Drive:
- STAN – Safety, center snapped ball out of end zone. Cal 28–23.

Top passers

- STAN – John Elway – 28/44, 257 yards, TD
- CAL – J Torchio – 11/22, 186 yards, TD

Top rushers

- STAN – Vincent White – 24 rushes, 83 yards, 2 TD
- CAL – John Tuggle – 27 rushes, 110 yards, TD

Top receivers

- STAN – Vincent White – 9 receptions, 109 yards, TD
- CAL – Don Sprague – 2 receptions, 62 yards

Cal made a goal-line stand with 1:07 remaining to preserve the victory.

== Personnel ==
1980 California Golden Bears football team roster
Players
Coaches
Offense

Pos.	#	Name	Class
OL		Brian Bailey
WR		Matt Bouza
WR		Michael Buggs
QB	19	Rich Campbell	Sr
OL		Jesse Covarrubias
WR		Floyd Eddings
RB		Mark Funderburk
OL		Tim Galas
QB		Gale Gilbert
TE		David Lewis
RB		Edgardo Mixco
RB		Carl Montgomery
TE		Dan Mosley
RB		Dave Palmer
WR		Tyrone Portee
OL		Harvey Salem
WR		Holden Smith
OL		Bruce Sorensen
TE		Don Sprague
OL		Greg Stubblefield
QB		J Torchio	So
RB		John Tuggle
RB		Terry Wiley
RB		Tyran Wright

Defense

Pos.	#	Name	Class
DB		Ahmed Anderson
DB		Gregg Beagle
LB		Steve Cacciara
DL		Reggie Camp
DB		Ron Coccimiglio
LB		Rich Dixon
DL		Pat Graham
DL		Kirk Karacozoff
DB		Mike Lozica
LB		Ulysses Madison
DL		Dupre Marshall
DB		Kevin Moen
LB		Paul Najarian
DL		Rich Stachowski
DB		John Sullivan
DB		Fred Williams

Special teams

Pos.	#	Name	Class
P		Mike Ahr
P		Mike Fortunato
K	45	Mick Luckhurst

Head coach

- Roger Theder

Coordinators/assistant coaches

- Gunther Cunningham
- Al Saunders

Legend

- (C) Team captain
- (S) Suspended
- (I) Ineligible
- Injured
- Redshirt
