= 1980 USC Trojans football team =

American college football season

1980 USC Trojans football
- Conference: Pacific-10 Conference

Ranking
- Coaches: No. 12
- AP: No. 11
- Record: 8–2–1 (4–2–1 Pac-10)
- Head coach: John Robinson (5th season)
- Captains: Ronnie Lott; Keith Van Horne
- Home stadium: Los Angeles Memorial Coliseum

1980 Pacific-10 Conference football standings
	Conf.					Overall
Team	W		L		T	W		L		T
No. 16 Washington $	6	–	1	–	0	9	–	3	–	0
No. 13 UCLA	5	–	2	–	0	9	–	2	–	0
No. 11 USC	4	–	2	–	1	8	–	2	–	1
Arizona State	5	–	3	–	0	7	–	4	–	0
Oregon	4	–	3	–	1	6	–	3	–	2
Stanford	3	–	4	–	0	6	–	5	–	0
Arizona	3	–	4	–	0	5	–	6	–	0
Washington State	3	–	4	–	0	4	–	7	–	0
California	3	–	5	–	0	3	–	8	–	0
Oregon State	0	–	8	–	0	0	–	11	–	0
$ – Conference champion; Rankings from AP Poll

The 1980 USC Trojans football team represented the University of Southern California (USC) in the 1980 NCAA Division I-A football season. In their fifth year under head coach John Robinson, the Trojans compiled an 8–2–1 record (4–2–1 against conference opponents), finished in third place in the Pacific-10 Conference (Pac-10), and outscored their opponents by a combined total of 265 to 134.

Quarterback Gordon Adams led the team in passing, completing 104 of 179 passes for 1,237 yards with seven touchdowns and seven interceptions. Marcus Allen led the team in rushing with 354 carries for 1,563 yards and 14 touchdowns. Hoby Brenner led the team in receiving with 26 catches for 315 yards and no touchdowns.

== Schedule ==
Date	Opponent	Rank	Site	TV	Result	Attendance	Source
September 13	at Tennessee*	No. 5	Neyland Stadium; Knoxville, TN	ESPN	W 20–17	95,049	
September 20	No. 20 South Carolina*	No. 4	Los Angeles Memorial Coliseum; Los Angeles, CA		W 23–13	58,385	
September 27	at Minnesota*	No. 5	Memorial Stadium; Minneapolis, MN		W 24–7	55,115	
October 4	Arizona State^{†}	No. 4	Los Angeles Memorial Coliseum; Los Angeles, CA		W 23–21	69,052	
October 11	at Arizona	No. 2	Arizona Stadium; Tucson, AZ	ONTV	W 27–10	54,789	
October 18	at Oregon	No. 2	Autzen Stadium; Eugene, OR	USA	T 7–7	43,733	
November 1	California	No. 7	Los Angeles Memorial Coliseum; Los Angeles, CA		W 60–7	55,658	
November 8	at Stanford	No. 4	Stanford Stadium; Stanford, CA (rivalry)	ABC	W 34–9	84,892	
November 15	Washington	No. 2	Los Angeles Memorial Coliseum; Los Angeles, CA		L 10–20	55,515	
November 22	at No. 18 UCLA	No. 12	Los Angeles Memorial Coliseum; Los Angeles, CA (Victory Bell)	ABC	L 17–20	83,491	
December 6	No. 2 Notre Dame*	No. 17	Los Angeles Memorial Coliseum; Los Angeles, CA (rivalry)	ABC	W 20–3	82,663	
*Non-conference game; ^{†}Homecoming; Rankings from AP Poll released prior to the game

== Personnel ==
1980 USC Trojans football team roster
Players
Coaches
Offense

Pos.	#	Name	Class
QB		Gordon Adams
RB	33	Marcus Allen	Jr
TE	89	Hoby Brenner	Sr
RB		Paul DiLulo
G	64	Roy Foster	Jr
RB		Anthony Gibson
RB		Michael Harper
WR	5	Speedy Hart	RSr
TE	85	James Hunter	Sr
WR		Thomas Jefferson
RB		Doug MacKenzie
C	66	Bruce Matthews	So
RB		Bob McClanahan
WR		Malcolm Moore
OT	72	Don Mosebar	So
OL		Allen Pugh
WR		Vic Rakshani
G	77	Ken Ruettgers	Fr
WR	25	Jeff Simmons	So
OT	67	Kelly Thomas	So
QB	15	Scott Tinsley	So
OT	68	Keith Van Horne	Sr
WR		Timmy White
WR	8	Kevin Williams	Sr

Defense

Pos.	#	Name	Class
DL		George Achica
LB	51	Chip Banks	Jr
DT	94	Bryon Darby	So
S	47	Joey Browner	So
DL		Keith Browner
LB	54	Steve Busick	Sr
DL	87	August Curley	So
DL	94	Byron Darby	So
DL		Dennis Edwards
CB	40	Jeff Fisher	Sr
LB		Riki Gray
DB		Don Jones
S	42	Ronnie Lott	Sr
LB	81	Eric Scoggins	Sr
DB	49	Dennis Smith	Sr
DL		Charles Ussery

Special teams

Pos.	#	Name	Class
K		Eric Hipp
P	13	John Perry	Sr

Head coach

- John Robinson

Coordinators/assistant coaches

Legend

- (C) Team captain
- (S) Suspended
- (I) Ineligible
- Injured
- Redshirt

== Game summaries ==
=== Minnesota ===
- Marcus Allen 42 rushes, 216 yards

=== Arizona St ===
Team	1	2	3	4	Total
Arizona St	0	7	7	7	21
• USC	7	13	3	0	23

- Date: October 4
- Location: Los Angeles Memorial Coliseum
- Game attendance: 69,052

Scoring summary
Q1	USC	Allen 2 yard run (Hipp kick)	USC 7–0
Q2	ASU	Mistler 3 yard pass from Pagel (Lewis kick)	Tie 7–7
Q2	USC	Hipp 33 yard field goal	USC 10–7
Q2	USC	Simmons 15 yard pass from Adams (Hipp kick)	USC 17–7
Q2	USC	Hipp 43 yard field goal	USC 20–7
Q3	ASU	Gittens 59 yard run (Lewis kick)	USC 20–14
Q3	USC	Hipp 27 yard field goal	USC 23–14
Q4	ASU	Wetzel 14 yard pass from Pagel (Lewis kick)	USC 23–21

- Marcus Allen 36 Rush, 133 Yds

=== Oregon ===
Team	1	2	3	4	Total
USC	0	7	0	0	7
Oregon	0	0	7	0	7

- Date: October 18
- Location: Autzen Stadium

Scoring summary
Q2	USC	Simmons 38 yard pass from Adams (Hipp kick)	USC 7–0
Q3	ORE	Jones 3 yard run (Jollymour kick)	Tie 7–7

=== Washington ===
- Marcus Allen 30 rushes, 216 yards

=== Vs. UCLA ===
#18 UCLA Bruins (7–2) vs. #12 USC Trojans (7–1–1)

Quarter	1	2	3	4	Total
USC	3	0	7	7	17
UCLA	0	7	7	6	20

at Los Angeles Memorial Coliseum, Los Angeles, California

- Date: November 22
- Game attendance: 83,491
- Eugene Register-Guard, 1980 Nov 23.

Game information

First quarter

- USC – Eric Hipp 32-yard field goal. USC 3–0. Drive:

Second quarter

- UCLA – Freeman McNeil 6-yard run (Norm Johnson kick). UCLA 7–3. Drive: 80 yards.

Third quarter

- USC – Jeff Simmons 12-yard pass from Scott Tinsley (Eric Hipp kick), 12:05. USC 10–7. Drive:
- UCLA – Michael Brant 25-yard pass from Jay Schroeder (Norm Johnson kick). UCLA 14–10. Drive:

Fourth quarter

- USC – Marcus Allen 1-yard run (Eric Hipp kick), 12:33. USC 17–14. Drive: 10 plays, 43 yards.
- UCLA – Freeman McNeil 58-yard pass from Jay Schroeder (kick failed), 2:07. UCLA 20–17. Drive: 6 plays, 80 yards.

Top passers

- USC – Scott Tinsley – 15/27, 146 yards, TD, INT
- UCLA – Jay Schroeder – 9/11, 165 yards, 2 TD, INT

Top rushers

- USC – Marcus Allen – 37 rushes, 72 yards, TD
- UCLA – Freeman McNeil – 24 rushes, 111 yards, TD

Top receivers

- USC – Jeff Simmons – 5 receptions, 53 yards, TD
- UCLA – Freeman McNeil – 2 receptions, 74 yards, TD

=== Notre Dame ===
Team	1	2	3	4	Total
Notre Dame	0	0	3	0	3
• USC	0	10	0	10	20

- Date: December 6
- Location: Los Angeles Memorial Coliseum, Los Angeles, CA
- Game attendance: 82,663
- Television network: ABC

Scoring summary
2	8:23	USC	Harper 6-yard run (Hipp kick)	USC 7-0
2		USC	Hipp 22-yard field goal	USC 10-0
3		ND	Oliver 30-yard field goal	USC 10-3
4		USC	Hipp 17-yard field goal	USC 13-3
4	1:09	USC	Harper 10-yard run (Hipp kick)	USC 20-3

== Team players drafted into the NFL ==
- Ronnie Lott, 1st round, San Francisco 49ers
- Keith Van Horne, 1st round, Chicago Bears
- Dennis Smith, 1st round, Denver Broncos\
- Ray Butler, 4th round, Baltimore Colts
- Kevin Williams, 7th round, New Orleans Saints
- Jeff Fisher, 7th round, Chicago Bears
- Steve Busick, 7th round, Denver Broncos
- James Hunter, 9th round, Pittsburgh Steelers
- Eric Scoggins, 12th round, Baltimore Colts

== Awards and honors ==
- Former USC Trojans player Tay Brown, was inducted into the College Football Hall of Fame
