= 1980 Arizona Wildcats football team =

American college football season

1980 Arizona Wildcats football
- Conference: Pacific-10 Conference
- Record: 5–6 (3–4 Pac-10)
- Head coach: Larry Smith (1st season)
- Offensive coordinator: Steve Axman (1st season)
- Defensive coordinator: Moe Ankney (1st season)
- Captain: Hubie Oliver
- Home stadium: Arizona Stadium

1980 Pacific-10 Conference football standings
	Conf.					Overall
Team	W		L		T	W		L		T
No. 16 Washington $	6	–	1	–	0	9	–	3	–	0
No. 13 UCLA	5	–	2	–	0	9	–	2	–	0
No. 11 USC	4	–	2	–	1	8	–	2	–	1
Arizona State	5	–	3	–	0	7	–	4	–	0
Oregon	4	–	3	–	1	6	–	3	–	2
Stanford	3	–	4	–	0	6	–	5	–	0
Arizona	3	–	4	–	0	5	–	6	–	0
Washington State	3	–	4	–	0	4	–	7	–	0
California	3	–	5	–	0	3	–	8	–	0
Oregon State	0	–	8	–	0	0	–	11	–	0
$ – Conference champion; Rankings from AP Poll

The 1980 Arizona Wildcats football team represented the University of Arizona in the Pacific-10 Conference (Pac-10) during the 1980 NCAA Division I-A football season. In their first season under head coach Larry Smith, the Wildcats compiled a 5–6 record (3–4 against Pac-10 opponents), finished in a tie for sixth place in the Pac-10, and were outscored by their opponents, 275 to 215. The team played its home games in Arizona Stadium in Tucson, Arizona.

Despite finishing the season with a 5–6 record, the Wildcats defeated UCLA (who was ranked second at the time), which would become the first of several signature moments during Smith's tenure with the program.

The team's statistical leaders included Tom Tunnicliffe with 1,204 passing yards, Hubert Oliver with 655 rushing yards, and Tim Holmes with 545 receiving yards. Linebacker Jack Housley led the team with 104 total tackles.

== Before the season ==
Arizona finished the 1979 season with a 6–5 record, and lost to Pittsburgh in the Fiesta Bowl. During the offseason, head coach Tony Mason was discovered as being allegedly involved in a cash payment scandal by giving boosters money to players, which was illegal under NCAA rules. As a result, Mason resigned as coach and was replaced by Smith, who was coaching at Tulane. Smith was a former assistant coach at Arizona under Mason's predecessor Jim Young. In a press conference, Smith promised to rebuild the program and bring the team to a winning success.

== Schedule ==
Date	Time	Opponent	Site	TV	Result	Attendance	Source
September 20	7:00 p.m.	Colorado State*	Arizona Stadium; Tucson, AZ	KZAZ	L 13–15	48,511	
September 27	7:00 p.m.	at California	California Memorial Stadium; Berkeley, CA		W 31–24	41,000	
October 4	10:00 a.m.	at Iowa*	Kinnick Stadium; Iowa City, IA	ESPN	W 5–3	59,950	
October 11	6:00 p.m.	No. 2 USC	Arizona Stadium; Tucson, AZ	CBS	L 10–27	54,789	
October 18	12:30 p.m.	Washington State	Arizona Stadium; Tucson, AZ	USA	L 14–38	47,132	
October 25	7:30 p.m.	No. 4 Notre Dame*	Arizona Stadium; Tucson, AZ	ESPN	L 3–20	56,211	
November 1	12:30 p.m.	No. 2 UCLA^{†}	Arizona Stadium; Tucson, AZ	ABC	W 23–17	42,876	
November 8	8:30 p.m.	at Washington	Husky Stadium; Seattle, WA	ESPN	L 22–45	49,341	
November 15	3:00 p.m.	Pacific (CA)*	Arizona Stadium; Tucson, AZ	KZAZ	W 63–35	39,576	
November 22	2:00 p.m.	at Oregon State	Parker Stadium; Corvallis, OR		W 24–7	15,300	
November 29	10:00 a.m.	Arizona State	Arizona Stadium; Tucson, AZ (rivalry)	ABC	L 7–44	53,108	
*Non-conference game; ^{†}Homecoming; Rankings from AP Poll released prior to the game; All times are in Mountain time

== Game summaries ==
=== Colorado State ===
Arizona opened the season against ex-WAC foe Colorado State in Smith's debut as Wildcat coach. The Rams converted on a field goal in the game’s final minute to win it and ruin Smith’s first game.

=== California ===
The Wildcats went on the road to Berkeley to face California. Arizona narrowly defeated the Golden Bears to give Smith not only his first win as Arizona coach, but his first Pac-10 victory as well as his first road win.

=== Iowa ===
Arizona at Iowa

Team	1	2	3	4	Total
• Wildcats	2	3	0	0	5
Hawkeyes	0	0	0	3	3

- Date: October 4
- Location: Kinnick Stadium, Iowa City, IA
- Game attendance: 59,950

Scoring summary
1	12:07	ARIZ	Safety, punt blocked by Ware out of end zone	ARIZ 2–0
2	7:31	ARIZ	Weber 37-yard field goal	ARIZ 5–0
4	9:23	IOWA	Reggie Roby 36-yard field goal	ARIZ 5–3

The Wildcats traveled to Iowa in their next game against the Hawkeyes. Both Arizona and Iowa's offenses struggled throughout the game, but the Wildcats’ defense dominated and scored a safety early by blocking a punt. Arizona ultimately held on for the victory. It was one of the only games in college football history in which a team won by only scoring exactly five points. It was also Arizona's fifth consecutive win over Iowa dating back to 1970. They would not defeat the Hawkeyes again until 1998.

=== USC ===
In Smith's first big test as Arizona's coach, the Wildcats took on USC, who was ranked second in the nation. The Trojans would be no match for the Wildcats as they would earn an easy victory. Smith would ultimately leave Arizona to become USC’s coach after the 1986 season.

=== Notre Dame ===
Arizona played Notre Dame for the first time since 1941, with Notre Dame making its first visit to the state of Arizona. At home against the tough fourth-ranked Fighting Irish, the Wildcats never had a chance as they would be outplayed and scored only a field goal. A memorable play occurred in the second half when the Irish faked a punt to have more points and Arizona never recovered.

To date, this remains Notre Dame's only visit to Tucson (and very likely the only time ever), as the Wildcats believed that it would be too expensive to schedule a home game against a storied non-conference opponent like the Irish, allegedly since Tucson is a small market.

=== UCLA ===
For homecoming, Arizona hosted second-ranked UCLA. The Bruins were poised to get the top ranking with a win, as #1 Alabama had lost to Mississippi State earlier that day. However, the Wildcats put those hopes to rest by upsetting the Bruins and finally giving Smith his first home win as coach. It was also Smith's first big win at Arizona. The win by Arizona, combined with Alabama's loss, stunned the college football world as the top two ranked teams lost that day.

=== Arizona State ===
Arizona State at Arizona

Team	1	2	3	4	Total
• Sun Devils	14	17	13	0	44
Wildcats	0	0	7	0	7

- Date: November 29
- Location: Arizona Stadium, Tucson, AZ
- Television network: ABC

Scoring summary
1	ASU	Wetzel 22-yard pass from Pagel (Lewis kick)	ASU 7–0
1	ASU	Maxwell recovers blocked punt in end zone (Lewis kick)	ASU 14–0
2	ASU	Richards 35-yard interception return (Lewis kick)	ASU 21–0
2	ASU	Lewis 23-yard field goal	ASU 24–0
2	ASU	Mistler 4-yard pass from Pagel (Lewis kick)	ASU 31–0
3	ARIZ	Netting 18-yard pass from Tunnicliffe (Weber kick)	ASU 31–7
3	ASU	Pagel 1-yard run (Lewis kick)	ASU 38–7
3	ASU	Weathers yard run	ASU 44–7

In the rivalry game, Arizona and Arizona State faced each other. For the Wildcats, this was Smith's first matchup against ASU. The more experienced Sun Devils dominated the mistake-prone Wildcats in a blowout, as most of the Arizona Stadium crowd had already headed for the exits by the time the fourth quarter began. Arizona managed to get on the scoreboard with a touchdown in the third quarter that prevented a shutout against a blitzing Arizona State defense, but the deficit would be too much to overcome in an embarrassing rivalry loss.

Days after the game (and season) ended, Smith said in an interview that he claimed that ASU's dominance over Arizona in the rivalry at the time was a result of Arizona State being located in the larger Phoenix area (ASU's campus is in the suburb Tempe), as UA is located in Tucson, with its metro area being smaller than Phoenix's, and referred to ASU as the state's “de facto NFL team” as a result (the state of Arizona did not get an NFL team until 1988 when the Cardinals relocated from St. Louis), and that it led to the Wildcats being consistently played in the Sun Devils’ shadow due to Arizona State's performance under the coaching prestige of former coach Frank Kush, who was fired midway through the previous season. Smith later said that as the new coach, he vowed to rebuild the program to build a bright future and to lead the Wildcats to a winning tradition.

The Wildcats finished Smith's first season with a record of 5–6.

== Season notes ==
- Smith's first season was known as a rebuilding year to fans. An extremely difficult schedule also affected Arizona's chances at a bowl game, and led to the team's mediocre record.
- The season was the only one in the 1980s that Arizona finished with a losing record and one of only two seasons in the decade that they had a non-winning record (the other was in 1987 when they went 4–4–3).
- Also, this season started a decade of resurgence for the Wildcats, fulfilling Smith's promise when he was hired before the season started (see above).
- Arizona did not play Texas Tech for the first time since 1970.
- From mid-October through early November, due to Pac-10 scheduling, the Wildcats played four consecutive home games.
- The victory over UCLA was the first big win under Smith, which became overshadowed by Arizona's upset of USC (UCLA's chief rival) during the following season.
- This season was the only one in Smith lost to ASU at home. Arizona did not lose to their rival at home again until 1992. In addition, this was the only time under Smith that the Wildcats scored less than ten points against ASU.
- The game against Arizona State had the earliest start time in Arizona Stadium history. The 10:00 a.m. kickoff was due to the fact that the game was televised regionally and that there were scheduling conflicts within the broadcasting window, meaning that there wasn't an open afternoon/evening time slot available for the game to kick off.
- This was the last season until 2012 that Arizona wore red helmets and also the last season until 2005 that they wore red jerseys for home games. The red helmets had been worn since the 1977 season and were previously used from 1967 to 1972 and the red jerseys had been their primary home jerseys since 1977. Arizona officials believed that the team wearing red was too confusing with Pac-10 schools USC, Stanford, Arizona State, and Washington State, whose colors are a variation and/or a darker shade of red (Arizona and conference foe California have blue as one of their colors, though Arizona's blue is slightly lighter than California's, who has a darker shade of blue). Beginning in 1981, the Wildcats returned to wearing blue jerseys at home and white helmets for the first time since 1976. Prior to 1977, Arizona had worn the blue jerseys for home games. The helmets would feature a red “A” on them and it was worn by players until the end of the 1989 season.
- Arizona did not wear red jerseys for a home game against Arizona State again until 2006.

== After the season ==
Although the Wildcats finished the 1980 season with a losing record, they would begin improving under Smith and started to compete with the other conference teams, as Arizona completed their third season as a Pac-10 member, and would build a winning culture for both the university and the Tucson community that lasted through most of the 1980s and the team would become known for their upset victories under Smith's watch. Even though they would later be punished for their part in the scandal prior to Smith's hiring, Arizona would bring in recruits to bring success to start a period of dominance that would surprise fans across Arizona and credit Smith for making the Wildcats a relevant team again, like what Young did during the mid-1970s.

== Personnel ==
1980 Arizona Wildcats football team roster
Players
Coaches
Offense

Pos.	#	Name	Class
FB	39	Rory Barnett
WR	9	Bob Carter	Jr
		Richard Hersey
RB	6	Brian Holland
		Tim Holmes
RB	44	Hubie Oliver (C)	Sr
		John Pace
TE	81	Rich Roberts
QB	12	Tom Tunnicliffe	Fr

Defense

Pos.	#	Name	Class
DT	98	Robert Cobb	Sr
LB	56	Sam Giangardella	Sr
CB	32	Marcellus Greene	Sr
LB		Jack Housley
DT	92	Mike Robinson	Sr

Special teams

Pos.	#	Name	Class
P		Barry Kramer
P	13	Sergio Vega
K	5	Brett Weber

Head coach

- Larry Smith

Coordinators/assistant coaches

Legend

- (C) Team captain
- (S) Suspended
- (I) Ineligible
- Injured
- Redshirt
