= 1980 Oregon State Beavers football team =

American college football season

1980 Oregon State Beavers football
- Conference: Pacific-10 Conference
- Record: 0–11 (0–8 Pac-10)
- Head coach: Joe Avezzano (1st season)
- Home stadium: Parker Stadium

1980 Pacific-10 Conference football standings
	Conf.					Overall
Team	W		L		T	W		L		T
No. 16 Washington $	6	–	1	–	0	9	–	3	–	0
No. 13 UCLA	5	–	2	–	0	9	–	2	–	0
No. 11 USC	4	–	2	–	1	8	–	2	–	1
Arizona State	5	–	3	–	0	7	–	4	–	0
Oregon	4	–	3	–	1	6	–	3	–	2
Stanford	3	–	4	–	0	6	–	5	–	0
Arizona	3	–	4	–	0	5	–	6	–	0
Washington State	3	–	4	–	0	4	–	7	–	0
California	3	–	5	–	0	3	–	8	–	0
Oregon State	0	–	8	–	0	0	–	11	–	0
$ – Conference champion; Rankings from AP Poll

The 1980 Oregon State Beavers football team represented Oregon State University as a member of the Pacific-10 Conference (Pac-10) during the 1980 NCAA Division I-A football season In their first season under head coach Joe Avezzano, the Beavers compiled an overall record of 0–11 with a mark of 0–8 in conference play, finished last in the Pac-10, and were outscored by their opponents 386 to 108. The team played four home games on campus at Parker Stadium in Corvallis, Oregon.

Avezzano, previously the offensive coordinator at Tennessee under Johnny Majors, was hired in late 1979; he succeeded Craig Fertig and signed a four-year contract at $40,000 per year.

== Schedule ==
Date	Opponent	Site	Result	Attendance	Source
September 13	at Wyoming*	War Memorial Stadium; Laramie, WY	L 10–30	20,113	
September 20	at Arizona State	Sun Devil Stadium; Tempe, AZ	L 14–42	64,861	
September 27	at Texas*	Texas Memorial Stadium; Austin, TX	L 0–35	60,381	
October 11	Washington	Parker Stadium; Corvallis, OR	L 6–41	33,000	
October 18	at California	California Memorial Stadium; Berkeley, CA	L 6–27	30,454	
October 25	Long Beach State*	Parker Stadium; Corvallis, OR	L 21–31	20,000	
November 1	at Stanford	Stanford Stadium; Stanford, CA	L 13–54	43,294	
November 8	at Washington State	Martin Stadium; Pullman, WA	L 7–28	15,651	
November 15	Oregon	Parker Stadium; Corvallis, OR (Civil War)	L 21–40	41,600	
November 22	Arizona	Parker Stadium; Corvallis, OR	L 7–24	15,300	
November 30	vs. No. 14 UCLA	National Stadium; Tokyo, Japan (Mirage Bowl)	L 3–34	80,000	
*Non-conference game; Rankings from AP Poll released prior to the game

== Game summaries ==
=== Arizona State ===
- Tony Robinson - 168 yards rushing and two touchdowns on 37 attempts

== Personnel ==
1980 Oregon State Beavers football team roster
Players
Coaches
Offense

Pos.	#	Name	Class
HB		Randy Holmes
FB		Tony Robinson

Defense

Pos.	#	Name	Class

Special teams

Pos.	#	Name	Class

Head coach

- Joe Avezzano

Coordinators/assistant coaches

Legend

- (C) Team captain
- (S) Suspended
- (I) Ineligible
- Injured
- Redshirt
