= 1980 Washington Huskies football team =

American college football season

1980 Washington Huskies football

Pac-10 champion

Rose Bowl, L 6–23 vs. Michigan
- Conference: Pacific-10 Conference

Ranking
- Coaches: No. 17
- AP: No. 16
- Record: 9–3 (6–1 Pac-10)
- Head coach: Don James (6th season)
- Offensive coordinator: Bob Stull (2nd season)
- Defensive coordinator: Jim Lambright (3rd season)
- MVP: Tom Flick
- Captains: Tom Flick; Randy Van Divier; Rusty Olsen; Ken Gardner
- Home stadium: Husky Stadium

1980 Pacific-10 Conference football standings
	Conf.					Overall
Team	W		L		T	W		L		T
No. 16 Washington $	6	–	1	–	0	9	–	3	–	0
No. 13 UCLA	5	–	2	–	0	9	–	2	–	0
No. 11 USC	4	–	2	–	1	8	–	2	–	1
Arizona State	5	–	3	–	0	7	–	4	–	0
Oregon	4	–	3	–	1	6	–	3	–	2
Stanford	3	–	4	–	0	6	–	5	–	0
Arizona	3	–	4	–	0	5	–	6	–	0
Washington State	3	–	4	–	0	4	–	7	–	0
California	3	–	5	–	0	3	–	8	–	0
Oregon State	0	–	8	–	0	0	–	11	–	0
$ – Conference champion; Rankings from AP Poll

The 1980 Washington Huskies football team was an American football team that represented the University of Washington during the 1980 NCAA Division I-A football season. In its sixth season under head coach Don James, the team compiled a 9–2 record in the regular season and were Pacific-10 Conference champions at 6–1. They returned to the Rose Bowl, but fell to favored Michigan; for the season Washington outscored its opponents 333 to 198.

Both regular season losses were at home at Husky Stadium. The sole conference loss was to border rival Oregon, who last defeated the Huskies in 1973; it was the first loss for James against a Northwest team. In his eighteen games against the Ducks, James lost only three; the other two were in 1987 and 1988. The conference opponents not played this season were California and UCLA. The Huskies' winning streak over Washington State in the Apple Cup reached seven with another win in Spokane; it has not been held there since.

Senior quarterback Tom Flick was selected as the team's most valuable player; Flick, Ken Gardner, Rusty Olsen, and Randy Van Divier were the team captains.

== Schedule ==
Date	Opponent	Rank	Site	Result	Attendance	Source
September 13	Air Force*	No. 19	Husky Stadium; Seattle, WA	W 50–7	44,999	
September 20	Northwestern*	No. 16	Husky Stadium; Seattle, WA	W 45–7	49,975	
September 27	Oregon	No. 13	Husky Stadium; Seattle, WA (rivalry)	L 10–34	56,282	
October 4	at Oklahoma State*		Lewis Field; Stillwater, OK	W 24–18	48,200	
October 11	at Oregon State		Parker Stadium; Corvallis, OR	W 41–6	33,000	
October 18	at No. 20 Stanford		Stanford Stadium; Stanford, CA	W 27–24	60,066	
October 25	Navy*	No. 18	Husky Stadium; Seattle, WA	L 10–24	48,841	
November 1	Arizona State		Husky Stadium; Seattle, WA	W 25–0	48,691	
November 8	Arizona		Husky Stadium; Seattle, WA	W 45–22	49,341	
November 15	at No. 2 USC		Los Angeles Memorial Coliseum; Los Angeles, CA	W 20–10	55,512	
November 22	at Washington State	No. 16	Joe Albi Stadium; Spokane, WA (Apple Cup)	W 30–23	34,577	
January 1, 1981	vs. No. 5 Michigan*	No. 16	Rose Bowl; Pasadena, CA (Rose Bowl)	L 6–23	104,863	
*Non-conference game; Rankings from AP Poll released prior to the game; Source:

== Roster ==
1980 Washington Huskies football team roster
Players
Coaches
Offense

Pos.	#	Name	Class
WR	15	Anthony Allen	So
TE	86	David Bayle	Sr
WR	17	Ron Blacken	Sr
OL		Pat Bresolin
G	57	James Carter	Jr
QB	6	Tim Cowan
G	75	Mike Curtis	Sr
RB		Brenno DeFeo
QB	12	Tom Flick (C)	Sr
WR	80	Danny Greene	Fr
RB		Sterling Hinds
RB		Ron Jackson
RB		Chris James
G	56	Rick Mallory	Fr
OT	78	Curt Marsh	Sr
TE		Lance Neubauer
QB	16	Steve Pelluer	Fr
C	53	Mike Reilly	Sr
FB	32	Willie Rosborough	So
WR	7	Paul Skansi	So
RB	20	Kyle Stevens
RB		Kyle Stewart
RB	45	Toussaint Tyler	Sr
OT	79	Randy Van Divier (C)	Sr
WR	91	Aaron Williams

Defense

Pos.	#	Name	Class
CB	4	Dennis Brown	So
LB	48	Tony Caldwell	So
LB	40	Ken Driscoll	So
LB	82	Bret Gagliardi	Sr
S	69	Ken Gardner (C)	Sr
DT	92	Scott Garnett	Fr
S	3	Derek Harvey	So
CB	8	Ray Horton	Jr
DT	65	Fletcher Jenkins	Jr
LB	67	Mark Jerue	Jr
LB	47	Jerry McLain	Sr
DB	23	Vince Newsome	So
DB	33	Chris O'Connor
DT	64	Rusty Olsen (C)	Sr
LB	49	Steve Pope	Jr
CB	2	William Reed	Jr
CB	11	Bill Stapleton	So
LB	38	Mark Stewart	So

Special teams

Pos.	#	Name	Class
P	14	Rich Camarillo	Sr
K	13	Chuck Nelson	So

Head coach

- Don James (6th year)

Coordinators/assistant coaches

- Jim Lambright (DC)
- Bob Stull (OC)

Legend

- (C) Team captain
- (S) Suspended
- (I) Ineligible
- Injured
- Redshirt

== NFL draft selections ==
Five University of Washington Huskies were selected in the 1981 NFL draft, which lasted twelve rounds with 332 selections.

= Husky Hall of Fame

Player	Position	Round	Overall	Franchise
Curt Marsh	Tackle	1st	23	Oakland Raiders
Randy Van Divier	Tackle	3rd	68	Baltimore Colts
Tom Flick	Quarterback	4th	90	Washington Redskins
Toussaint Tyler	Running back	9th	222	New Orleans Saints
Rusty Olsen	Defensive tackle	9th	234	Denver Broncos
