= 1980 Stanford Cardinals football team =

American college football season

1980 Stanford Cardinals football
- Conference: Pacific-10 Conference
- Record: 6–5 (3–4 Pac-10)
- Head coach: Paul Wiggin (1st season)
- Offensive coordinator: Dennis Green (1st season)
- Offensive scheme: West Coast
- Defensive coordinator: Jack Harbaugh (1st season)
- Base defense: 4–3
- Home stadium: Stanford Stadium

1980 Pacific-10 Conference football standings
	Conf.					Overall
Team	W		L		T	W		L		T
No. 16 Washington $	6	–	1	–	0	9	–	3	–	0
No. 13 UCLA	5	–	2	–	0	9	–	2	–	0
No. 11 USC	4	–	2	–	1	8	–	2	–	1
Arizona State	5	–	3	–	0	7	–	4	–	0
Oregon	4	–	3	–	1	6	–	3	–	2
Stanford	3	–	4	–	0	6	–	5	–	0
Arizona	3	–	4	–	0	5	–	6	–	0
Washington State	3	–	4	–	0	4	–	7	–	0
California	3	–	5	–	0	3	–	8	–	0
Oregon State	0	–	8	–	0	0	–	11	–	0
$ – Conference champion; Rankings from AP Poll

The 1980 Stanford Cardinals football team represented Stanford University in the Pacific-10 Conference during the 1980 NCAA Division I-A football season. Following the surprise resignation of Rod Dowhower after one season in January, Stanford's new head coach was alumnus Paul Wiggin, and he led the Cardinals to a 6–5 record (3–4 in Pac-10, tied for sixth). Home games were played on campus at Stanford Stadium in Stanford, California.

Hired in February, Wiggin was a former star defensive end at Stanford (All-Pacific Coast in 1955, 1956), played 11 years in the National Football League (NFL), was a head coach for three seasons with the Kansas City Chiefs (1975–1977), and most recently was the defensive coordinator of the New Orleans Saints.

After the season in December, offensive coordinator Dennis Green became the head coach at Northwestern in the Big Ten Conference, and receivers/backs coach Jim Fassel was promoted. Green returned to Stanford as head coach in 1989.

== Schedule ==
Date	Opponent	Rank	Site	TV	Result	Attendance	Source
September 6	at Oregon	No. 15	Autzen Stadium; Eugene, OR (rivalry)		W 35–25	37,300	
September 13	Tulane*	No. 13	Stanford Stadium; Stanford, CA		W 19–14	54,829	
September 20	at Boston College*	No. 11	Alumni Stadium; Chestnut Hill, MA		L 13–30	32,037	
September 27	at No. 4 Oklahoma*		Oklahoma Memorial Stadium; Norman, OK		W 31–14	75,811	
October 4	San Jose State*	No. 15	Stanford Stadium; Stanford, CA (rivalry)		W 35–21	61,127	
October 11	at No. 5 UCLA	No. 16	Los Angeles Memorial Coliseum; Los Angeles, CA (rivalry)		L 21–35	64,175	
October 18	Washington	No. 20	Stanford Stadium; Stanford, CA	ABC	L 24–27	60,066	
October 25	at Washington State		Martin Stadium; Pullman, WA		W 48–34	30,371	
November 1	Oregon State		Stanford Stadium; Stanford, CA		W 54–13	43,294	
November 8	No. 4 USC		Stanford Stadium; Stanford, CA (rivalry)	ABC	L 9–34	84,892	
November 22	at California		California Memorial Stadium; Berkeley, CA (Big Game)		L 23–28	78,258	
*Non-conference game; Rankings from AP Poll released prior to the game

== Game summaries ==
=== At California ===
Stanford Cardinal (6–4) at California Golden Bears (2–8)

Quarter	1	2	3	4	Total
Stanford	7	0	0	16	23
California	7	14	0	7	28

at California Memorial Stadium, Berkeley, California

- Date: November 22
- Game attendance: 78,258

Game information

First quarter

- CAL – John Tuggle 15-yard run (Mick Luckhurst kick). Cal 7–0. Drive:
- STAN – Vincent White 1-yard run (Ken Naber kick). Tie 7–7. Drive:

Second quarter

- CAL – Tyrone Portee 24-yard pass from J Torchio (Mick Luckhurst kick). Cal 14–7. Drive:
- CAL – John Tuggle 2-yard run (Mick Luckhurst kick). Cal 21–7. Drive:

Third quarter

- No scoring

Fourth quarter

- STAN – Vincent White 32-yard pass from John Elway (Ken Naber kick). Cal 21–14. Drive:
- STAN – Vincent White 4-yard run (Ken Naber kick). Tie 21–21. Drive:
- CAL – J Torchio 3-yard run (Mick Luckhurst kick). Cal 28–21. Drive:
- STAN – Safety, center snapped ball out of end zone. Cal 28–23.

Top passers

- STAN – John Elway – 28/44, 257 yards, TD
- CAL – J Torchio – 11/22, 186 yards, TD

Top rushers

- STAN – Vincent White – 24 rushes, 83 yards, 2 TD
- CAL – John Tuggle – 27 rushes, 110 yards, TD

Top receivers

- STAN – Vincent White – 9 receptions, 109 yards, TD
- CAL – Don Sprague – 2 receptions, 62 yards

Two costly fumbles and being stopped on the goal line with 1:07 left, ended Stanford's season on a sour note, and knocked them out of possible Peach Bowl consideration.

== Roster ==
1980 Stanford Cardinal football team roster
Players
Coaches
Offense

Pos.	#	Name	Class
HB	41	LaMott Atkins	Jr
FB	32	Jim Brown	Sr
TE	82	Jim Clymer	Fr
OL	59	John Delmare	Jr
RB	24	Mike Dotterer	So
TE	83	Chris Dressel	So
OL	78	Jim Dykstra	Sr
QB	7	John Elway	So
FB	35	Jeff Haile	Sr
OT	67	Brian Holloway	Sr
FB	40	Greg Hooper	So
C	66	John Macauley	Sr
WR	28	Ken Margerum	Sr
OL	71	Bo Mattson	Sr
FB	33	Rob Moore	So
FB	36	Mark Mordell	Jr
HB	23	Eric Mullins	Fr
OL	68	Mike Neill	Sr
HB	31	Darrin Nelson	Jr
OL	62	Chris Rose	So
WR	26	Mike Tolliver	So
WR	25	Andre Tyler	Sr
HB	22	Vincent White	So
QB	18	Phil Wilson	Jr

Defense

Pos.	#	Name	Class
DL	65	Craig Awbrey	Jr
DB	48	Kevin Baird	So
DL	74	Duke Dapper	Sr
DB	11	Rick Gervais	Sr
DB	20	Rod Gilmore	Jr
DL	83	Kevin Lamar	Fr
DB	12	Kevin MacMillan	So
LB	80	Milt McColl	Sr
LB	50	Dave Morze	Jr
DL	60	Doug Rogers	Jr
LB	98	Jay Summers	Jr
DB	45	Vaughn Williams	Fr
LB	58	Gary Wimmer	So
LB	52	Craig Zellmer	Sr

Special teams

Pos.	#	Name	Class
K, P	10	Ken Naber	Sr

Head coach

- Paul Wiggin (1st year)

Coordinators/assistant coaches

- Dennis Green (OC)
- Jack Harbaugh (DC)
- Jim Fassel (QB, WR)
- Larry Mac Duff (OL)
- Dave Ottmar (TE)
- Chuck Detwiler (DB)
- Ray Handley (OLB)
- Dick James (OL)

Legend

- (C) Team captain
- (S) Suspended
- (I) Ineligible
- Injured
- Redshirt
