= 1980 Oregon Ducks football team =

American college football season

1980 Oregon Ducks football
- Conference: Pacific-10 Conference
- Record: 6–3–2 (4–3–1 Pac-10)
- Head coach: Rich Brooks (4th season)
- Offensive coordinator: Erik Widmark (1st season)
- Captain: Game captains
- Home stadium: Autzen Stadium

1980 Pacific-10 Conference football standings
| | Conf. | | | | | Overall |
| Team | W | | L | | T | W | | L | | T |
|---|---|---|---|---|---|---|---|---|---|---|
| No. 16 Washington $ | 6 | – | 1 | – | 0 | 9 | – | 3 | – | 0 |
| No. 13 UCLA | 5 | – | 2 | – | 0 | 9 | – | 2 | – | 0 |
| No. 11 USC | 4 | – | 2 | – | 1 | 8 | – | 2 | – | 1 |
| Arizona State | 5 | – | 3 | – | 0 | 7 | – | 4 | – | 0 |
| Oregon | 4 | – | 3 | – | 1 | 6 | – | 3 | – | 2 |
| Stanford | 3 | – | 4 | – | 0 | 6 | – | 5 | – | 0 |
| Arizona | 3 | – | 4 | – | 0 | 5 | – | 6 | – | 0 |
| Washington State | 3 | – | 4 | – | 0 | 4 | – | 7 | – | 0 |
| California | 3 | – | 5 | – | 0 | 3 | – | 8 | – | 0 |
| Oregon State | 0 | – | 8 | – | 0 | 0 | – | 11 | – | 0 |
$ – Conference champion; Rankings from AP Poll

The 1980 Oregon Ducks football team represented the University of Oregon in the 1980 NCAA Division I-A football season. Playing as a member of the Pacific-10 Conference (Pac-10), the team was led by head coach Rich Brooks, in his fourth year, and played their home games at Autzen Stadium in Eugene, Oregon. They finished the season with a record of six wins, three losses and two ties (6–3–2 overall, 4–3–1 in the Pac-10).

In their rivalry game with Washington, the Ducks won in Seattle for the first time in 12 years; the win also broke a six-game losing streak to the Huskies. Oregon defeated all three northwest teams in the Pac-10, their first sweep in 26 years.

After the season in December, Brooks' contract was extended through the 1984 season with a salary increase, from under $37,000 to over $46,000.

== Schedule ==
| Date | Time | Opponent | Site | TV | Result | Attendance | Source |
|---|---|---|---|---|---|---|---|
| September 6 | 1:30 pm | Stanford | Autzen Stadium; Eugene, OR (rivalry) | | L 25–35 | 37,300 | |
| September 13 | 1:30 pm | Kansas* | Autzen Stadium; Eugene, OR | | T 7–7 | 27,750 | |
| September 20 | 1:30 pm | Michigan State* | Autzen Stadium; Eugene, OR | | W 35–7 | 30,431 | |
| September 27 | 1:30 pm | at No. 18 Washington | Husky Stadium; Seattle, WA (rivalry) | | W 34–10 | 51,008 | |
| October 11 | 1:00 pm | at California | California Memorial Stadium; Berkeley, CA | | L 6–31 | 35,000 | |
| October 18 | 1:30 pm | No. 2 USC | Autzen Stadium; Eugene, OR (rivalry) | | T 7–7 | 42,733 | |
| October 25 | 1:30 pm | UNLV* | Autzen Stadium; Eugene, OR | | W 32–9 | 31,651 | |
| November 1 | 12:30 pm | Washington State | Autzen Stadium; Eugene, OR | ABC | W 20–10 | 30,083 | |
| November 8 | 1:30 pm | at No. 8 UCLA | Los Angeles Memorial Coliseum; Los Angeles, CA | | W 20–14 | 40,907 | |
| November 15 | 1:00 pm | at Oregon State | Parker Stadium; Corvallis, OR (Civil War) | | W 40–21 | 41,600 | |
| November 22 | 6:30 pm | at Arizona State | Sun Devil Stadium; Tempe, AZ | | L 37–42 | 61,623 | |
*Non-conference game; Rankings from AP Poll released prior to the game; All times are in Pacific time

== Roster ==
1980 Oregon Ducks football team roster
Players
Coaches
Offense

| Pos. | # | Name | Class |
|---|---|---|---|
| RB | 32 | Charlie Bisharat | So |
| WR | 81 | Jon Brosterhous | Jr |
| RB | 48 | Reggie Brown | Jr |
| RB | | Don Davis |
| C | 52 | Mike Delegato | So |
| TE | 88 | Greg Hogensen | Jr |
| WR | 24 | Curt Jackson | Jr |
| WR | 21 | Mark James |
| RB | 9 | Ladaria Johnson |
| RB | 33 | Terrance Jones | So |
| OT | 69 | Jeff Kubitz | So |
| WR | 23 | Rourke Lowe | So |
| QB | 13 | Kevin Lusk | So |
| G | 68 | Jamey Matthews |
| OT | 76 | Kevin McGill | Sr |
| WR | | Greg Moser |
| QB | 11 | Reggie Ogburn | Sr |
| WR | 2 | Dwight Robertson | Jr |
| G | 73 | Scott Shepard | So |
| TE | 85 | Tim Tyler | So |
| RB | | Vince Williams |
| G | 55 | Stu Yatsko | Jr |
| RB | | Eugene Young |
| C | 56 | Gary Zimmerman | So |

Defense

| Pos. | # | Name | Class |
|---|---|---|---|
| DB | 44 | Gary Beck | Jr |
| DL | 83 | Gordon Bledsoe | Jr |
| DB | 28 | Steve Brown | So |
| DB | 10 | Dennis Clay | So |
| DB | 40 | Joe Figures | Jr |
| DB | 6 | Ross Gibbs | Jr |
| DL | 63 | Vince Goldsmith | Sr |
| LB | 47 | Ed Hagerty | Jr |
| LB | 16 | Bryan Hinkle | Sr |
| DL | 45 | Bill Lowder | So |
| DB | 43 | Mike Nolan | Sr |
| DL | 35 | Rich Schwartz | Sr |
| DL | 94 | Scott Setterlund | Sr |
| LB | 51 | Andy Vobora | Jr |
| DE | 54 | Michael Walter | So |

Special teams

| Pos. | # | Name | Class |
|---|---|---|---|
| P | 36 | Mike Babb |
| K | 4 | Pat English |
| K | 3 | Doug Jollymour |

Head coach

- Rich Brooks (4th year)

Coordinators/assistant coaches

- Erik Widmark (OC)
- Bob McCray (OL)

Legend

- (C) Team captain
- (S) Suspended
- (I) Ineligible
- Injured
- Redshirt

== NFL draft ==
Two Ducks were selected in the 1981 NFL draft, which lasted 12 rounds (332 selections).

| Player | Position | Round | Pick | Franchise |
| Bryan Hinkle | Linebacker | 6 | 156 | Pittsburgh Steelers |
| Kevin McGill | Tackle | 12 | 325 | Cleveland Browns |
