= 1980 Arizona State Sun Devils football team =

American college football season

1980 Arizona State Sun Devils football
- Conference: Pacific-10 Conference
- Record: 7–4 (5–3 Pac-10)
- Head coach: Darryl Rogers (1st season)
- Offensive coordinator: Bob Baker (1st season)
- Defensive coordinator: George Dyer (1st season)
- Captain: John Mistler
- Home stadium: Sun Devil Stadium

1980 Pacific-10 Conference football standings
	Conf.					Overall
Team	W		L		T	W		L		T
No. 16 Washington $	6	–	1	–	0	9	–	3	–	0
No. 13 UCLA	5	–	2	–	0	9	–	2	–	0
No. 11 USC	4	–	2	–	1	8	–	2	–	1
Arizona State	5	–	3	–	0	7	–	4	–	0
Oregon	4	–	3	–	1	6	–	3	–	2
Stanford	3	–	4	–	0	6	–	5	–	0
Arizona	3	–	4	–	0	5	–	6	–	0
Washington State	3	–	4	–	0	4	–	7	–	0
California	3	–	5	–	0	3	–	8	–	0
Oregon State	0	–	8	–	0	0	–	11	–	0
$ – Conference champion; Rankings from AP Poll

The 1980 Arizona State Sun Devils football team represented Arizona State University as a member of the Pac-10 Conference (Pac-10) during the 1980 NCAA Division I-A football season. Led by first-year head coach Darryl Rogers, the Sun Devils compiled an overall record of 7–4, with a mark of 5–3 in conference play, and finished fourth in the Pac-10.

== Schedule ==
Date	Time	Opponent	Rank	Site	TV	Result	Attendance	Source
September 13	7:30 pm	No. 9 Houston*		Sun Devil Stadium; Tempe, AZ		W 29–13	64,868	
September 20	7:30 pm	Oregon State		Sun Devil Stadium; Tempe, AZ		W 42–14	64,831	
September 27	10:30 am	at No. 2 Ohio State*	No. 20	Ohio Stadium; Columbus, OH		L 21–38	88,097	
October 4	1:30 pm	at No. 4 USC		Los Angeles Memorial Coliseum; Los Angeles, CA		L 21–23	69,052	
October 11	7:30 pm	Washington State		Sun Devil Stadium; Tempe, AZ		W 27–21	64,333	
October 25	7:30 pm	Pacific (CA)*		Sun Devil Stadium; Tempe, AZ		W 37–9	57,579	
November 1	2:30 pm	at Washington		Husky Stadium; Seattle, WA		L 0–25	32,738	
November 8	7:30 pm	California		Sun Devil Stadium; Tempe, AZ		W 34–6	62,228	
November 15	7:30 pm	No. 17 UCLA^{†}		Sun Devil Stadium; Tempe, AZ		L 14–23	65,640	
November 22	7:30 pm	Oregon		Sun Devil Stadium; Tempe, AZ		W 42–37	61,623	
November 29	10:00 am	at Arizona		Arizona Stadium; Tucson, AZ (rivalry)	ABC	W 44–7	53,108	
*Non-conference game; ^{†}Homecoming; Rankings from AP Poll released prior to the game; All times are in Mountain time

== Roster ==
1980 Arizona State Sun Devils football team roster
Players
Coaches
Offense

Pos.	#	Name	Class
QB	19	Steve Bratkowski	Jr
QB	11	Sandy Osiecki	So
QB	10	Mike Pagel	Jr
RB	37	Gerald Riggs	Jr

Defense

Pos.	#	Name	Class
SS	25	Mike Richardson	So

Special teams

Pos.	#	Name	Class
P	7	Mike Black	So

Head coach

- Darryl Rogers

Coordinators/assistant coaches

- Al Luginbill – Linebackers

Legend

- (C) Team captain
- (S) Suspended
- (I) Ineligible
- Injured
- Redshirt
