= Scott Pelluer =

American football player and coach (1959–2023)

No. 53
- Position: Linebacker

Personal information
- Born: April 28, 1959; Yakima, Washington, U.S.
- Died: June 26, 2023 (aged 64); Seattle, Washington, U.S.
- Listed height: 6 ft 2 in (1.88 m)
- Listed weight: 219 lb (99 kg)

Career information
- High school: Interlake (Bellevue, Washington)
- College: Washington State
- NFL draft: 1981: 4th round, 91st overall pick

Career history

Playing
- Dallas Cowboys (1981)*; New Orleans Saints (1981–1986)
- * Offseason or practice squad member only

Coaching
- Boise State (1986–1992) Defensive assistant; Northern Arizona (1993-1995) Defensive coordinator and linebackers; Washington (1996–1998) Linebackers and safeties; Skyline High School (2000) Defensive coordinator; Arizona (2001–2002) Special teams and inside linebackers; Washington (2003–2004) Tight ends and special teams

Career NFL statistics
- Games played: 65
- Games started: 6
- Fumble recoveries: 2
- Stats at Pro Football Reference

Scott John Pelluer (April 28, 1959 – June 26, 2023) was an American professional football player who was a linebacker for the New Orleans Saints of the National Football League (NFL). He played college football for the Washington State Cougars and was selected by the Dallas Cowboys in the fourth round of the 1981 NFL draft. He also coached at several collegiate programs.

== Early life ==
Born in Yakima, Washington, Pelluer attended Mead High School north of Spokane, then moved in 1975 with his family to Bellevue, a suburb east of Seattle. He transferred to Interlake High School as a junior, and was a tight end and linebacker for the Saints.

After graduation in 1977, Pelluer accepted a scholarship from Washington State University in Pullman, where he was a four-year starter at defensive end and outside linebacker. As a junior in 1979, he registered 71 tackles, three sacks (led the team) and two interceptions. Pelluer followed that in 1980 with twelve sacks (a school record at the time) and two interceptions.

Pelluer finished his college career with 240 tackles (180 solo) and 19 sacks, at the time ranking as the school career sack leader and one of the top career tacklers.

== Professional career ==
=== Dallas Cowboys ===
Pelluer was selected by the Dallas Cowboys in the fourth round (91st overall) of the 1981 NFL draft. At the time, he was assisting with spring football practice at Weber State in Ogden, Utah, under first-year head coach Mike Price. Pelluer was waived by the Cowboys on August 3.

=== New Orleans Saints ===
On September 1, 1981, Pelluer was signed as a free agent by the New Orleans Saints, where he was a backup outside linebacker under head coach Bum Phillips. From 1981 to 1984, he only had one start at linebacker, focusing most of his playing time on special teams.

In 1985, he appeared in eleven games, with five starts as a right inside linebacker in the team's 3–4 defense. He missed three games with a hamstring injury, and was placed on the injured reserve list with a knee injury for the final two contests of the season.

On August 19, 1986, Pelluer was placed on the injured reserve list. In January 1987, he was released before the start of training camp, as part of a youth movement.

== Coaching career ==
From 1986 to 1992, Pelluer served as a defensive assistant coach at Boise State University. From 1993 to 1995, he was the defensive coordinator and linebackers coach at Northern Arizona University. In 1996, he was named the linebackers and safeties coach at the University of Washington.

In 1999, he joined the private sector to work for a sports Internet firm, while also being the color commentator on Washington State's football radio broadcasts. In 2000, he was named the defensive coordinator at Skyline High School, helping them win the Washington state championship.

From 2001 to 2002, he was the special teams coordinator and linebackers coach at the University of Arizona. In 2003, he returned to the University of Washington, to be the special teams coordinator and tight ends coach.

== Personal life ==
Pelluer's father Arnie (1934–1971) was a standout multi-sport athlete from Bremerton and played at Washington State from 1953 to 1955. He was later the track coach at Yakima Valley College, Whitworth in Spokane, and Eastern Washington in Cheney; diagnosed with diabetes, Arnie had a seizure while swimming at the Whitworth Terrace Community pool in Spokane and died at age 36. His widow Jodee (née Gustafson) later married Jim Harryman and the family moved to the Seattle area in 1975 so the boys could play football at Interlake under head coach Rollie Robbins, a friend of Arnie's.

Brother Steve (born 1962) was the starting quarterback for rival Washington and in the NFL with the Dallas Cowboys; youngest brother Arnie was a linebacker at Stanford from 1985 to 1989. Their maternal grandfather, Carl Gustafson, was a fullback at Washington State from 1925 to 1927.

Pelluer's three sons played Division I college football: Tyler at Montana (FCS), Cooper at Washington, and Peyton at Washington State.

At age 64, Pelluer died from a cardiac arrest at a Seattle hospital on June 26, 2023.
