= 1980 NCAA Division I-A football season =

American college football season

1980 NCAA Division I-A season
- Number of teams: 139
- Preseason AP No. 1: Ohio State

Postseason
- Bowl games: 15
- Heisman Trophy: South Carolina running back George Rogers
- Champion(s): Georgia (AP, Coaches, FWAA, NFF)

Division I-A football seasons
- ← 1979 1981 →

The 1980 NCAA Division I-A football season was the season of college football played by teams at the highest level of the sport. The top five teams in the final AP and UPI polls were:

1. Georgia, coached by Vince Dooley, compiled a perfect 12–0 record, defeated Notre Dame in the Sugar Bowl, and was ranked No. 1 in the final polls. Freshman running back Herschel Walker gained 1,616 rushing yards and was a unanimous All-American.
2. Pittsburgh, coached by Jackie Sherrill, compiled an 11–1 record and defeated South Carolina in the Gator Bowl. The team was led by quarterback Dan Marino, defensive end Hugh Green, and offensive tackle Mark May. Green won the Maxwell Award and finished second in the Heisman Trophy voting. May won the Outland Trophy.
3. Oklahoma, coached by Barry Switzer, compiled a 10–2 record and defeated Florida State in the Orange Bowl. Quarterback J.C. Watts tallied 905 passing yards, 678 rushing yards, and 18 touchdowns.
4. Michigan, coached by Bo Schembechler, compiled a 10–2 record and defeated Washington in the Rose Bowl. The team did not allow a touchdown in its final five games. Wide receiver Anthony Carter caught 46 passes and was selected as the team's most valuable player.
5. Florida State, coached by Bobby Bowden, compiled a 10–2 record, lost to Oklahoma in the Orange Bowl. During the regular season, the Seminoles defeated No. 3 Nebraska at Nebraska and the following week defeated No. 2 Pittsburgh.

George Rogers of South Carolina tallied 1,781 rushing yards and won the Heisman Trophy. The year's statistical leaders included Rogers in rushing yardage, Jim McMahon of BYU with 4,571 passing yards, Rainey Meszaros of Pacific with 1,062 receiving yards, and Sammy Winder of Southern MIss with 120 points scored.

== Rules changes ==
- Offensive linemen are permitted full arm extension on so-called "retreat" blocking during pass plays, and clenched hands are permitted.
- The "chop block" (a second offensive player blocking a defensive player below the knees while engaged with another offensive player) is outlawed.
- A tie-breaker system was proposed for the post-season (similar to the one adopted for the 1995 post-season, except the start of overtime was at the 15–yard line and no defensive scores allowed), but failed to gain acceptance by the bowls.
- Facemasking now includes grabbing the helmet as well as the facemask.

== Conference and program changes ==
School	1979 Conference	1980 Conference
Air Force Falcons	Independent	WAC

== September ==
Most of the top teams of 1979 were expected to have strong seasons again in 1980. The preseason AP Poll had a top five of No. 1 Ohio State, No. 2 Alabama, No, 3 Pittsburgh, No. 4 USC, and No. 5 Oklahoma, all of whom had finished undefeated or with one loss the previous year. Georgia, which had gone just 6–5 in 1979, started at No. 16.

September 6: No. 2 Alabama was the first top-five team to begin its schedule, winning 26–3 over Georgia Tech. The other teams at the top of the poll had not begun their seasons; the next poll changed only slightly, with No. 1 Ohio State, No. 2 Alabama, No. 3 Pittsburgh, No. 4 Oklahoma, and No. 5 USC.

September 13: No. 1 Ohio State hosted Syracuse and won 31–21. No. 2 Alabama was idle. No. 3 Pittsburgh defeated Boston College 14–6, No. 4 Oklahoma beat Kentucky 29–7, and No. 5 USC won 20–17 at Tennessee. The AP voters shuffled the teams around somewhat: No. 1 Alabama, No. 2 Ohio State, No. 3 Oklahoma, No. 4 USC, and No. 5 Pittsburgh.

September 20: No. 1 Alabama defeated Mississippi 59–35 in a game arranged independently from the official SEC schedule. No. 2 Ohio State shut out Minnesota 47–0. No. 3 Oklahoma was idle. No. 4 USC won 23–13 over No. 20 South Carolina. No. 5 Pittsburgh defeated Kansas 18–3, but still fell out of the top five. No. 6 Nebraska impressed the voters with a 57–0 blowout of Iowa and moved up several spots in the next poll: No. 1 Alabama, No. 2 Ohio State, No. 3 Nebraska, No. 4 Oklahoma, and No. 5 USC.

September 27: Whilst both teams had no national ranking, the final meeting between college football's maiden rivalry occurred in Piscataway, New Jersey, as the Rutgers Scarlet Knights upended the Princeton Tigers 44–13. As both institutions have gone in opposite directions, no attempts to revive the first rivalry have transpired, nor will likely happen. No. 1 Alabama blanked Vanderbilt 41–0. No. 2 Ohio State won 38–21 over No. 20 Arizona State. No. 3 Nebraska visited No. 11 Penn State and came away with a 21–7 victory. The first of the top teams to lose was No. 4 Oklahoma, which fell 31–14 at home to John Elway and Stanford. No. 5 USC won 24–7 at Minnesota. No. 7 Texas shut out Oregon State 35–0 and moved into the top five in the next poll: No. 1 Alabama, No. 2 Ohio State, No. 3 Nebraska, No. 4 USC, and No. 5 Texas.

== October ==
October 4: No. 1 Alabama recorded their second consecutive shutout, 45–0 over Kentucky, but the teams behind them were not as successful. No. 2 Ohio State was shut out at home by No. 11 UCLA, 17–0. No. 3 Nebraska was also upset at home, losing to No. 16 Florida State 18–14 on a fumble at the Seminoles’ three-yard line with 12 seconds left. No. 4 USC almost met a similar fate, but pulled out a 23–21 victory against Arizona State. No. 5 Texas won 41–28 at Rice. No. 6 Pittsburgh beat Maryland 38–9 and returned to the top five in the next poll: No. 1 Alabama, No. 2 USC, No. 3 Texas, No. 4 Pittsburgh, and No. 5 UCLA.

October 11: No. 1 Alabama had a surprisingly tough time with unheralded Rutgers, but the Tide prevailed 17–13. No. 2 USC won 27–10 at Arizona. No. 3 Texas met No. 12 Oklahoma in the Red River Shootout and dealt the Sooners another loss, 20–13. No. 4 Pittsburgh lost by a score of 36–22 to No. 11 Florida State, the Seminoles’ second consecutive win against a top-four opponent. No. 5 UCLA defeated No. 16 Stanford 35–21. No. 7 Notre Dame won 32–14 against No. 13 Miami. Three of the Irish's four wins had been over ranked teams, and they moved up in the next poll: No. 1 Alabama, No. 2 USC, No. 3 Texas, No. 4 UCLA, and No. 5 Notre Dame.

October 18: No. 1 Alabama bounced back with another shutout win, 27–0 at Tennessee. No. 2 USC got bogged down in the rain at Oregon and had to settle for a 7–7 tie. No. 3 Texas and No. 4 UCLA were idle. No. 5 Notre Dame dominated Army 30–3. No. 6 Georgia, who had been slowly moving up in the poll with a mixture of narrow wins and blowouts (three of their six wins were by a touchdown or less, and the other three were by more than 30 points) defeated Vanderbilt 41–0 and moved up in the next poll: No. 1 Alabama, No. 2 Texas, No. 3 UCLA, No. 4 Notre Dame, and No. 5 Georgia.

October 25: No. 1 Alabama won 42–7 over No. 20 Southern Mississippi. No. 2 Texas fell to SMU by a score of 20–6, and the Longhorns would end up losing five of their last seven games after a 5–0 start. No. 3 UCLA defeated California 32–9 on the road. No. 4 Notre Dame won 20–3 at Arizona. No. 5 Georgia registered a second straight shutout by defeating Kentucky 27–0. No. 6 Florida State, whose only loss was by a single point to Miami, beat Memphis 24–3 to move into the top five: No. 1 Alabama, No. 2 UCLA, No. 3 Notre Dame, No. 4 Georgia, and No. 5 Florida State.

== November ==
November 1: After five straight weeks with at least one major upset, this may have been the craziest day of all. No. 1 Alabama, which had held the top ranking for six weeks and was riding a 28-game winning streak, was knocked off by Mississippi State, 6–3; similar to the earlier Nebraska-Florida State game, the favored team lost on a late fumble at the three-yard line. No. 2 UCLA heard the news of Alabama's loss, but the Bruins could not take advantage, falling 23–17 to Arizona in Tucson. No. 3 Notre Dame shut out Navy 33–0. No. 4 Georgia squeaked past No. 14 South Carolina 13–10 in a matchup between star running backs Herschel Walker and George Rogers. No. 5 Florida State crushed Tulsa 45–2, No. 7 USC blew California out 60–7, and No. 8 Nebraska defeated No. 15 Missouri 38–16. The next poll featured No. 1 Notre Dame, No. 2 Georgia, No. 3 Florida State, No. 4 USC, and No. 5 Nebraska.

November 8: The madness continued as new No. 1 Notre Dame was held to a 3–3 tie by Georgia Tech, who would finish with a 1–9–1 record. For the second week in a row, the second-ranked team struggled after being notified that the team above them had lost. No. 2 Georgia trailed rival No. 20 Florida late in the game when QB Buck Belue hit WR Lindsay Scott on an out pattern; Scott turned upfield and went 90 yards for the winning score in the season's most memorable play. It was Scott's only touchdown reception all season and it gave the Bulldogs a 26–21 win, making them the only undefeated and untied team in the nation. The other top teams had less trouble. No. 3 Florida State defeated Virginia Tech 31–7, No. 4 USC won 34–9 at Stanford, No. 5 Nebraska beat Kansas State 55–8, and No. 6 Alabama won 28–7 over LSU. The next poll featured No. 1 Georgia, No. 2 USC, No. 3 Florida State, No. 4 Nebraska, and No. 5 Alabama.

November 15: No. 1 Georgia won 31–21 at Auburn, the first game of the season where their winning margin was more than 7 but less than 30; the victory clinched the SEC title and a Sugar Bowl berth for the Bulldogs. For the fifth week in a row, a top-two team suffered an upset, as No. 2 USC lost at home to Washington, 20–10, moving the Huskies into first place in the Pac-10. No. 3 Florida State was idle, beginning an unusual three-week layoff before their last game. No. 4 Nebraska shut out Iowa State 35–0. No. 6 Notre Dame went down to Birmingham and beat No. 5 Alabama 7–0. No. 7 Ohio State, who had started at the top of the poll and still had only one loss, beat Iowa 41–7 and finally returned to the top five: No. 1 Georgia, No. 2 Notre Dame, No. 3 Florida State, No. 4 Nebraska, and No. 5 Ohio State.

November 22: No. 1 Georgia and No. 3 Florida State were idle, while No. 2 Notre Dame won 24–10 over Air Force. No. 4 Nebraska and No. 9 Oklahoma met to decide the Big 8 title and the Orange Bowl berth, and for the second straight year the underdog Sooners narrowly upset the Cornhuskers (this time winning 21–17 on a touchdown with less than a minute to play). No. 5 Ohio State and No. 10 Michigan squared off in their usual showdown for the Big Ten championship, and once again the underdog won a close game, with the Wolverines prevailing 9–3. Michigan's Rose Bowl opponent would be No. 16 Washington, who clinched the Pac-10 title with a 30–23 win over Washington State. No. 6 Pittsburgh and No. 7 Penn State were idle as they prepared for their rivalry game, but both teams moved into the top five after the Nebraska and Ohio State losses: No. 1 Georgia, No. 2 Notre Dame, No. 3 Florida State, No. 4 Pittsburgh, and No. 5 Penn State.

November 28–29: No. 1 Georgia completed their undefeated season with a 38–20 win over Georgia Tech. No. 2 Notre Dame and No. 3 Florida State were idle. No. 4 Pittsburgh faced No. 5 Penn State, and the Panthers’ defense led the way to a 14–9 victory. No. 6 Oklahoma had finished its season, but the Sooners moved up in the next poll: No. 1 Georgia, No. 2 Notre Dame, No. 3 Florida State, No. 4 Pittsburgh, and No. 5 Oklahoma.

== December ==
December 6: The season ended with one final upset as No. 2 Notre Dame, whose only previous blemish was their tie against Georgia Tech, fell 20–3 to No. 17 USC. No. 3 Florida State, the only other highly ranked team which had not finished its schedule, defeated No. 19 Florida 17–13. No. 6 Michigan moved up one spot in the final regular-season poll: No. 1 Georgia, No. 2 Florida State, No. 3 Pittsburgh, No. 4 Oklahoma, and No. 5 Michigan.

The major bowls extended their invitations in mid-November when there were still games left to be played, which led to problems for some of the top-ranked teams. Predicting that Notre Dame would defeat USC and finish undefeated, the Sugar Bowl organizers arranged for a meeting between the Fighting Irish and Georgia, which would have been a No. 1 vs. No. 2 showdown. The early invitation, combined with Notre Dame's late-season loss, cost Florida State (the actual No. 2 team in the final poll) a chance to play in a de facto national championship game. The Seminoles ended up in an Orange Bowl rematch against Oklahoma, who had defeated them in the same event the previous year.

The other unfortunate team was Pittsburgh, which was shut out of the New Year's Day bowls despite a No. 3 ranking and a 10–1 record (their only loss being to Florida State). The Cotton Bowl organizers invited No. 9 Alabama to face No. 6 Baylor (who earned the automatic bid as the SWC champion) before the Panthers had obtained their resume-building win over Penn State. Since the Rose Bowl was contracted to feature the Big Ten and Pac-10 winners, the Panthers had to settle for a Gator Bowl bid against No. 18 South Carolina and Heisman Trophy winner George Rogers.

== Conference standings ==
1980 Atlantic Coast Conference football standings
	Conf.					Overall
Team	W		L		T	W		L		T
No. 10 North Carolina $	6	–	0	–	0	11	–	1	–	0
Maryland	5	–	1	–	0	8	–	4	–	0
NC State	3	–	3	–	0	6	–	5	–	0
Clemson	2	–	4	–	0	6	–	5	–	0
Wake Forest	2	–	4	–	0	5	–	6	–	0
Virginia	2	–	4	–	0	4	–	7	–	0
Duke	1	–	5	–	0	2	–	9	–	0
$ – Conference champion; Rankings from AP Poll

1980 Big Eight Conference football standings
	Conf.					Overall
Team	W		L		T	W		L		T
No. 3 Oklahoma $	7	–	0	–	0	10	–	2	–	0
No. 7 Nebraska	6	–	1	–	0	10	–	2	–	0
Missouri	5	–	2	–	0	8	–	4	–	0
Iowa State	3	–	4	–	0	7	–	4	–	0
Oklahoma State	3	–	4	–	0	4	–	7	–	0
Kansas State	2	–	5	–	0	4	–	7	–	0
Kansas	1	–	6	–	0	2	–	8	–	1
Colorado	1	–	6	–	0	1	–	10	–	0
$ – Conference champion; Rankings from AP Poll

1980 Big Ten Conference football standings
	Conf.					Overall
Team	W		L		T	W		L		T
No. 4 Michigan $	8	–	0	–	0	10	–	2	–	0
No. 15 Ohio State	7	–	1	–	0	9	–	3	–	0
No. 17 Purdue	7	–	1	–	0	9	–	3	–	0
Iowa	4	–	4	–	0	4	–	7	–	0
Minnesota	4	–	5	–	0	5	–	6	–	0
Indiana	3	–	5	–	0	6	–	5	–	0
Wisconsin	3	–	5	–	0	4	–	7	–	0
Illinois	3	–	5	–	0	3	–	7	–	1
Michigan State	2	–	6	–	0	3	–	8	–	0
Northwestern	0	–	9	–	0	0	–	11	–	0
$ – Conference champion; Rankings from AP Poll

1980 Ivy League football standings
	Conf.					Overall
Team	W		L		T	W		L		T
Yale $	6	–	1	–	0	8	–	2	–	0
Cornell	5	–	2	–	0	5	–	5	–	0
Harvard	4	–	3	–	0	7	–	3	–	0
Brown	4	–	3	–	0	6	–	4	–	0
Princeton	4	–	3	–	0	6	–	4	–	0
Dartmouth	4	–	3	–	0	4	–	6	–	0
Penn	1	–	6	–	0	1	–	9	–	0
Columbia	0	–	7	–	0	1	–	9	–	0
$ – Conference champion

1980 Mid-American Conference football standings
	Conf.					Overall
Team	W		L		T	W		L		T
Central Michigan $	7	–	2	–	0	9	–	2	–	0
Western Michigan	6	–	3	–	0	7	–	4	–	0
Northern Illinois	4	–	3	–	0	7	–	4	–	0
Miami (OH)	4	–	3	–	0	5	–	6	–	0
Ball State	5	–	4	–	0	6	–	5	–	0
Ohio	5	–	4	–	0	6	–	5	–	0
Bowling Green	4	–	4	–	0	4	–	7	–	0
Toledo	3	–	6	–	0	4	–	7	–	0
Kent State	3	–	6	–	0	3	–	8	–	0
Eastern Michigan	1	–	7	–	0	1	–	9	–	0
$ – Conference champion

1980 Missouri Valley Conference football standings
	Conf.					Overall
Team	W		L		T	W		L		T
Tulsa $	4	–	1	–	0	8	–	3	–	0
Wichita State	4	–	1	–	1	5	–	5	–	1
Indiana State	4	–	2	–	0	6	–	5	–	0
Drake	3	–	2	–	0	8	–	3	–	0
West Texas State	2	–	4	–	0	5	–	6	–	0
New Mexico State	1	–	4	–	1	3	–	7	–	1
Southern Illinois	1	–	5	–	0	3	–	8	–	0
$ – Conference champion

1980 Pacific Coast Athletic Association football standings
	Conf.					Overall
Team	W		L		T	W		L		T
Long Beach State $	5	–	0	–	0	8	–	3	–	0
Utah State	4	–	1	–	0	6	–	5	–	0
San Jose State	3	–	2	–	0	7	–	4	–	0
Fresno State	1	–	4	–	0	5	–	6	–	0
Cal State Fullerton	1	–	4	–	0	4	–	7	–	0
Pacific (CA)	1	–	4	–	0	4	–	8	–	0
$ – Conference champion

1980 Pacific-10 Conference football standings
	Conf.					Overall
Team	W		L		T	W		L		T
No. 16 Washington $	6	–	1	–	0	9	–	3	–	0
No. 13 UCLA	5	–	2	–	0	9	–	2	–	0
No. 11 USC	4	–	2	–	1	8	–	2	–	1
Arizona State	5	–	3	–	0	7	–	4	–	0
Oregon	4	–	3	–	1	6	–	3	–	2
Stanford	3	–	4	–	0	6	–	5	–	0
Arizona	3	–	4	–	0	5	–	6	–	0
Washington State	3	–	4	–	0	4	–	7	–	0
California	3	–	5	–	0	3	–	8	–	0
Oregon State	0	–	8	–	0	0	–	11	–	0
$ – Conference champion; Rankings from AP Poll

1980 Southeastern Conference football standings
	Conf.					Overall
Team	W		L		T	W		L		T
No. 1 Georgia $	6	–	0	–	0	12	–	0	–	0
No. 19 Mississippi State	5	–	1	–	0	9	–	3	–	0
No. 6 Alabama	5	–	1	–	0	10	–	2	–	0
LSU	4	–	2	–	0	7	–	4	–	0
Florida	4	–	2	–	0	8	–	4	–	0
Tennessee	3	–	3	–	0	5	–	6	–	0
Ole Miss	2	–	4	–	0	3	–	8	–	0
Kentucky	1	–	5	–	0	3	–	8	–	0
Auburn	0	–	6	–	0	5	–	6	–	0
Vanderbilt	0	–	6	–	0	2	–	9	–	0
$ – Conference champion; Rankings from AP Poll

1980 Southern Conference football standings
	Conf.					Overall
Team	W		L		T	W		L		T
Furman $	7	–	0	–	0	9	–	1	–	1
Chattanooga	5	–	2	–	0	8	–	3	–	0
Appalachian State	4	–	2	–	1	6	–	4	–	1
The Citadel	3	–	2	–	0	7	–	4	–	0
Western Carolina	2	–	4	–	1	3	–	7	–	1
VMI	1	–	4	–	1	3	–	7	–	1
East Tennessee State	1	–	4	–	0	2	–	9	–	0
Marshall	0	–	5	–	1	2	–	8	–	1
Davidson	0	–	0	–	0	5	–	5	–	0
$ – Conference champion; This conference was a hybrid of I-A and I-AA programs. Davidson was classified as I-AA. The rest of the teams were I-A.

1980 Southland Conference football standings
	Conf.					Overall
Team	W		L		T	W		L		T
McNeese State $	5	–	0	–	0	10	–	2	–	0
Southwestern Louisiana	4	–	1	–	0	7	–	4	–	0
UT Arlington	3	–	2	–	0	3	–	8	–	0
Louisiana Tech	2	–	3	–	0	5	–	6	–	0
Lamar	1	–	4	–	0	3	–	8	–	0
Arkansas State	0	–	5	–	0	2	–	9	–	0
$ – Conference champion

1980 Southwest Conference football standings
	Conf.					Overall
Team	W		L		T	W		L		T
No. 14 Baylor $	8	–	0	–	0	10	–	2	–	0
No. 20 SMU	5	–	3	–	0	8	–	4	–	0
Houston	5	–	3	–	0	7	–	5	–	0
Texas	4	–	4	–	0	7	–	5	–	0
Rice	4	–	4	–	0	5	–	6	–	0
Arkansas	3	–	5	–	0	7	–	5	–	0
Texas A&M	3	–	5	–	0	4	–	7	–	0
Texas Tech	3	–	5	–	0	5	–	6	–	0
TCU	1	–	7	–	0	1	–	10	–	0
$ – Conference champion; Rankings from AP Poll

1980 Western Athletic Conference football standings
	Conf.					Overall
Team	W		L		T	W		L		T
No. 12 BYU $	6	–	1	–	0	12	–	1	–	0
Colorado State	5	–	1	–	1	6	–	4	–	1
Hawaii	3	–	3	–	0	8	–	3	–	0
Wyoming	4	–	4	–	0	6	–	5	–	0
San Diego State	4	–	4	–	0	4	–	8	–	0
New Mexico	3	–	4	–	0	4	–	7	–	0
Utah	2	–	3	–	1	5	–	5	–	1
Air Force	1	–	3	–	0	2	–	9	–	1
UTEP	1	–	6	–	0	1	–	11	–	0
$ – Conference champion; Rankings from AP Poll

1980 NCAA Division I-A independents football records
	Conf.					Overall
Team	W		L		T	W		L		T
No. 2 Pittsburgh		–		–		11	–	1	–	0
Tennessee State		–		–		9	–	1	–	0
No. 5 Florida State		–		–		10	–	2	–	0
No. 8 Penn State		–		–		10	–	2	–	0
No. 9 Notre Dame		–		–		9	–	2	–	1
No. 18 Miami (FL)		–		–		9	–	3	–	0
Southern Miss		–		–		9	–	3	–	0
Navy		–		–		8	–	4	–	0
South Carolina		–		–		8	–	4	–	0
Virginia Tech		–		–		8	–	4	–	0
Boston College		–		–		7	–	4	–	0
Northeast Louisiana		–		–		7	–	4	–	0
Rutgers		–		–		7	–	4	–	0
UNLV		–		–		7	–	4	–	0
Tulane		–		–		7	–	5	–	0
Colgate		–		–		5	–	4	–	1
North Texas State		–		–		6	–	5	–	0
Villanova		–		–		6	–	5	–	0
West Virginia		–		–		6	–	6	–	0
Louisville		–		–		5	–	6	–	0
Richmond		–		–		5	–	6	–	0
Syracuse		–		–		5	–	6	–	0
East Carolina		–		–		4	–	7	–	0
Illinois State		–		–		4	–	7	–	0
Temple		–		–		4	–	7	–	0
Army		–		–		3	–	7	–	1
Holy Cross		–		–		3	–	8	–	0
Cincinnati		–		–		2	–	9	–	0
Memphis State		–		–		2	–	9	–	0
William & Mary		–		–		2	–	9	–	0
Georgia Tech		–		–		1	–	9	–	1
Rankings from AP Poll

== No. 1 and No. 2 Progress ==
WEEKS	No. 1	No. 2	Event
PRE	Ohio State	Alabama	
1–3	Alabama	Ohio State	UCLA 17, Ohio State 0 (Oct. 4)
4–5	Alabama	USC	Oregon 7, USC 7 (Oct 18)
6	Alabama	Texas	SMU 20, Texas 6 (Oct 25)
7	Alabama	UCLA	Miss. St 6, Alabama 3 (Nov. 1) & Arizona 23, UCLA 17 (Nov. 1)
8	Notre Dame	Georgia	Ga. Tech 3, Notre Dame 3 (Nov. 8)
9	Georgia	USC	Washington 20, USC 10 (Nov 15)
10–11	Georgia	Florida State	USC 20, Notre Dame 3 (Dec 6)
12	Georgia	Pittsburgh	End Regular Season

== Notable rivalry games ==
- Notre Dame 29, Michigan 27
- Rutgers 44, Princeton 13 (Final meeting)
- Michigan 9, Ohio State 3
- No. 9 Oklahoma 21, No. 5 Nebraska 17
- UCLA 20, USC 17
- Pitt 14, Penn State 9
- California 28, Stanford 23
- No. 1 Georgia 38, Georgia Tech 20
- LSU 24, Tulane 7
- USC 20, No. 2 Notre Dame 3

== I-AA team wins over I-A teams ==
Italics denotes I-AA teams.

Date	Visiting team	Home team	Site	Result	Attendance	Ref.
September 6	Boise State	Utah	Robert Rice Stadium • Salt Lake City, Utah	28–7	27,231	
September 6	Wofford	East Tennessee State	Memorial Center • Johnson City, Tennessee	16–9	7,477	
September 13	UT Arlington	Northwestern State	Harry Turpin Stadium • Natchitoches, Louisiana	31–38		
September 13	Western Carolina	Tennessee Tech	Tucker Stadium • Cookeville, Tennessee	10–26	9,313	
September 20	Delaware	Temple	Veterans Stadium • Philadelphia, Pennsylvania	28–7	23,013	
September 20	Villanova	UMass	Warren McGuirk Alumni Stadium • Amherst, Massachusetts	12–24	11,494	
September 20	Murray State	Louisville	Fairgrounds Stadium • Louisville, Kentucky	13–9		
September 20	East Tennessee State	Southeastern Louisiana	Strawberry Stadium • Hammond, Louisiana	3–7	8,500	
September 26	Lehigh	Penn	Franklin Field • Philadelphia, Pennsylvania	35–6	14,864	
September 27	Bucknell	Brown	Brown Stadium • Providence, Rhode Island	28–20	7,000	
September 27	New Hampshire	Dartmouth	Memorial Field • Hanover, New Hampshire (Granite Bowl)	24–7	11,027	
September 27	Southeastern Louisiana	Illinois State	Hancock Stadium • Normal, Illinois	28–21	6,622	
October 4	Colgate	Connecticut	Memorial Stadium • Storrs, Connecticut	21–24	11,439	
October 4	Long Beach State	Tennessee State	Hale Stadium • Nashville, Tennessee	35–38	15,203	
October 11	Eastern Michigan	Akron	Rubber Bowl • Akron, Ohio	10–21		
October 18	Cal State Fullerton	No. 9 (I-AA) Boise State	Bronco Stadium • Boise, Idaho	11–26	17,052	
October 18	No. 8 (I-AA) Connecticut	Holy Cross	Fitton Field • Worcester, Massachusetts	18–17	6,000	
October 18	East Tennessee State	Eastern Kentucky	Hanger Field • Richmond, Kentucky	6–25	9,500	
October 18	Penn	Lafayette	Fisher Field • Easton, Pennsylvania	0–3	12,000	
October 25	No. T–10 (I-AA) Delaware	William & Mary	Cary Field • Williamsburg, Virginia (rivalry)	7–3	11,600	
October 25	Southeastern Louisiana	Northeast Louisiana	Malone Stadium • Monroe, Louisiana	55–30	17,203	
November 1	VMI	No. T–7 (I-AA) Boston University	Nickerson Field • Boston, Massachusetts	22–38	3,000	
November 1	Cornell	Bucknell	Memorial Stadium • Lewisburg, Pennsylvania	16–33	2,500	
November 1	Villanova	No. 9 (I-AA) Delaware	Delaware Stadium • Newark, Delaware (Battle of the Blue)	7–17	22,680	
November 1	Illinois State	Western Illinois	Hanson Field • Macomb, Illinois	0–27	3,631	
November 8	No. T–10 (I-AA) UMass	Holy Cross	Fitton Field • Worcester, Massachusetts	17–13	7,121	
November 15	No. T–6 (I-AA) Eastern Kentucky	East Carolina	Ficklen Memorial Stadium • Greenville, North Carolina	28–16	10,021	
^{#}Rankings from AP Poll released prior to game.

- Note:
  - Lehigh at Army tied 24–24.
  - Colgate at Lehigh tied 17–17.
  - Wofford at Furman tied 14–14.

=== Division II team wins over I-A teams ===
Italics denotes D-II teams.

Date	Visiting team	Home team	Site	Result	Attendance	Ref.
October 4	Illinois State	Eastern Illinois	O'Brien Stadium • Charleston, Illinois (Mid-America Classic)	14–31	10,500	
^{#}Rankings from AP Poll released prior to game.

== Bowl games ==
New Year's Day

- Sugar Bowl: No. 1 Georgia 17, No. 7 Notre Dame 10
- Orange Bowl: No. 4 Oklahoma 18, No. 2 Florida State 17
- Rose Bowl: No. 5 Michigan 23, No. 16 Washington 6
- Cotton Bowl: No. 9 Alabama 30, No. 6 Baylor 2

Other bowls

- Gator Bowl: No. 3 Pittsburgh 37, No. 18 South Carolina 9
- Sun Bowl: No. 8 Nebraska 31, No. 17 Mississippi State 17
- Fiesta Bowl: No. 10 Penn State 31, No. 11 Ohio State 19
- Peach Bowl: No. 20 Miami 20, Virginia Tech 10
- Bluebonnet Bowl: No. 13 North Carolina 16, Texas 7
- Liberty Bowl: Purdue 28, Missouri 25
- Hall of Fame Classic: Arkansas 34, Tulane 15
- Tangerine Bowl: Florida 35, Maryland 20
- Holiday Bowl: No. 14 BYU 46, No. 19 SMU 45
- Garden State Bowl: Houston 35, Navy 0
- Independence Bowl: Southern Mississippi 16, McNeese State 14

== Final AP and UPI rankings ==
Rank	AP	UPI
1.	Georgia	Georgia
2.	Pittsburgh	Pittsburgh
3.	Oklahoma	Oklahoma
4.	Michigan	Michigan
5.	Florida State	Florida State
6.	Alabama	Alabama
7.	Nebraska	Nebraska
8.	Penn State	Penn State
9.	Notre Dame	North Carolina
10.	North Carolina	Notre Dame
11.	UCLA	BYU
12.	BYU	UCLA
13.	USC	Baylor
14.	Baylor	USC
15.	Ohio State	Ohio State
16.	Washington	Purdue
17.	Purdue	Washington
18.	Miami (FL)	Miami (FL)
19.	Mississippi St.	Florida
20.	SMU	SMU

== Heisman Trophy voting ==
The Heisman Trophy is given to the year's most outstanding player

Player	School	Position	1st	2nd	3rd	Total
George Rogers	South Carolina	RB	216	179	122	1,128
Hugh Green	Pittsburgh	DE	179	125	74	861
Herschel Walker	Georgia	RB	107	120	122	638
Mark Herrmann	Purdue	QB	58	71	89	405
Jim McMahon	BYU	QB	30	32	35	189
Art Schlichter	Ohio State	QB	18	34	36	158
Neil Lomax	Portland State	QB	10	11	17	69
Jarvis Redwine	Nebraska	RB	4	16	20	64
Kenny Easley	UCLA	S	5	5	19	44
Anthony Carter	Michigan	WR	4	6	10	34

== Other major awards ==
- Maxwell - Hugh Green, DE, Pittsburgh
- Outland – Mark May, OT, Pittsburgh
- Camp - Hugh Green, DE, Pittsburgh
- Lombardi - Hugh Green, DE, Pittsburgh

== Attendances ==
Average home attendance top 3:

Rank	Team	Average
1	Michigan Wolverines	104,292
2	Tennessee Volunteers	88,649
3	Ohio State Buckeyes	87,925
