= Dan Dufour =

American football player (born 1960)

No. 71
- Position: Guard

Personal information
- Born: October 18, 1960 (age 66); Lynn, Massachusetts
- Listed height: 6 ft 5 in (1.96 m)
- Listed weight: 280 lb (127 kg)

Career information
- High school: Lynn (MA) Classical
- College: UCLA

Career history
- Atlanta Falcons (1983–1984)
- Stats at Pro Football Reference

Dan Dufour (born October 18, 1960) is an American former football guard. He played for the Atlanta Falcons from 1983 to 1984.
