= Randy Van Divier =

American football player (born 1958)

No. 79, 67, 68, 74
- Positions: Tackle, guard

Personal information
- Born: June 5, 1958 (age 68); Anaheim, California, U.S.
- Listed height: 6 ft 5 in (1.96 m)
- Listed weight: 274 lb (124 kg)

Career information
- High school: Anaheim
- College: Washington
- NFL draft: 1981: 3rd round, 68th overall pick

Career history
- Baltimore Colts (1981); Los Angeles Raiders (1982)*; Oakland Invaders (1984); Portland Breakers (1985); Los Angeles Raiders (1985)*
- * Offseason or practice squad member only

Awards and highlights
- Second-team All-Pac-10 (1980)

Career NFL statistics
- Games played: 16
- Games started: 1
- Stats at Pro Football Reference

Randall Lee Van Divier (/ˈvændɪvɪər/ VAN-dih-veer; born June 5, 1958) is an American former professional football player who was an offensive lineman in the National Football League (NFL). Van Divier, who played at Anaheim High School, was a captain for the 1980 Pac-10 champion Washington Huskies, and was later selected by the Baltimore Colts as the 68th overall pick in the third round of the 1981 NFL draft. After playing in 16 games with one start, Van Divier was cut by the Colts prior to the 1982 NFL season. Van Divier then signed with the Los Angeles Raiders but did not see action during the season. In 1983, he was cut by the Raiders at the end of training camp, and went on to play for the Oakland Invaders of the United States Football League (USFL) during the league's 1984 season. Following the season, he was signed and released by both the New Jersey Generals and the Portland Breakers prior to the 1985 USFL season but did not play for either team. He was re-signed by the Los Angeles Raiders but suffered a broken leg during a 1985 preseason game and was placed on season-ending injured reserve. Van Divier returned in 1986 but was waived during training camp prior to the regular season.
