= Scott Stauch =

American football player (born 1959)

No. 32
- Position: Running back

Personal information
- Born: January 3, 1959 (age 67); Seattle, Washington, U.S.
- Listed height: 5 ft 11 in (1.80 m)
- Listed weight: 204 lb (93 kg)

Career information
- High school: Grants Pass
- College: UCLA
- NFL draft: 1981: undrafted

Career history
- San Francisco 49ers (1981)*; New Orleans Saints (1981)
- * Offseason or practice squad member only
- Stats at Pro Football Reference

Scott Stauch (born January 3, 1959) is an American former professional football player who was a running back for one season for the New Orleans Saints of the National Football League (NFL). He played college football for the UCLA Bruins.
