= Samoa Samoa =

American football player (born 1956)

Profile
- Position: Running back

Personal information
- Born: September 23, 1956 (age 70); Leone, American Samoa
- Listed height: 6 ft 2 in (1.88 m)
- Listed weight: 207 lb (94 kg)

Career information
- High school: Carson (Carson, California, U.S.)
- College: Long Beach CC (1976–1977); Washington State (1978–1980)
- NFL draft: 1981: 9th round, 320th overall pick

Career history
- Cincinnati Bengals (1981)

Awards and highlights
- Second-team All-Metropolitan Conference (1977)

Samoa Sione Samoa (born September 23, 1956) is an American Samoan former player of American football. He was born in Leone, American Samoa, and moved to the mainland United States in ninth grade. He played high school football at Carson High School in Carson, California, and was the quarterback for the South team in the 1976 California Shrine Game played at the Rose Bowl. Samoa played college football at Long Beach City College, earning junior college All-American honors. He then transferred to Washington State University, where he was the Cougars' starting quarterback during the 1980 season. After a strong performance in the Hula Bowl all-star game, Samoa was selected by the Cincinnati Bengals in the ninth round of the 1981 NFL draft as a running back. He missed the entire 1981 NFL season due to a torn Achilles tendon, and was released before the start of the 1982 season. He later moved back to American Samoa.

== Early life ==
Samoa Sione Samoa was born on September 23, 1956, in Leone, American Samoa, and grew up playing rugby. He said that throwing rocks taught him how to throw a football, stating "In Samoa if you want a coconut, you gotta climb a tree or, if you lazy, you pick up a rock and knock down the coconut. I was lazy, so I learn to knock 'em down." He moved to the mainland United States in ninth grade, living with distant relatives, and attended junior high in Los Angeles. Samoa played high school football at Carson High School in Carson, California, as a quarterback. Samoa had received college football interest from USC and UCLA. However, he broke a bone in his leg late in his senior year of 1975, which hurt his college football prospects. He threw for 973 yards and 11 touchdowns during the 1975 season. Samoa also played volleyball in high school, and was offered a scholarship by UCLA to play the sport in college. Samoa was the quarterback for the South team in the 1976 California Shrine Game played at the Rose Bowl.

== College career ==
Samoa originally signed to play college football at Northern Arizona but switched to Long Beach City College, stating he wanted to transfer from Long Beach City to a Pacific-8 Conference school. As a freshman in 1976, Samoa split time with sophomore Greg Hopkins, completing 47 of 123 passes (38.2%) for 852 yards and eight touchdowns. Samoa earned honorable mention All-Metropolitan Conference honors and was also named the team's most promising freshman. He led Long Beach City to an 8–3 record as a sophomore in 1977, garnering team MVP, junior college All-American, and second-team Metropolitan Conference recognition. Samoa was ambidextrous, normally throwing with his left hand but also completed a right-handed pass while at Long Beach City. After his junior college career, Samoa received the most interest from Pittsburgh, Missouri, Kentucky, Washington State, and Washington.

Samoa chose to accept an offer from Washington State University, where he played for the Washington State Cougars of the Pacific-10 Conference. He redshirted the 1978 season and was a two-year letterman from 1979 to 1980. He was an option quarterback at Washington State. Samoa chose to wear jersey number 11 due to it being a double number like his double name of Samoa Samoa. His teammates nicknamed him "Repeat". Samoa played in four games as the backup to senior quarterback Steve Grant in 1979, completing eight of 17 passes (47.1%) for 105 yards. Samoa took over as starter his senior year in 1980, completing 105 of 200 passes (52.5%) for 1,668 yards, nine touchdowns, and 11 interceptions while also rushing for 453 yards and 11 touchdowns. He was a team captain during his senior year and was named the team's offensive player of the year. The Cougars finished the 1980 season with a 4–7 record. Samoa's 11 interceptions were the most in the Pacific-10 Conference that year. He was teammates with his American Samoan cousins Jack Thompson, Tali Ena, and Dave Pritchard while at Washington State. Samoa majored in elementary education in college, stating "Right now, my biggest problem still the language. But I getting over it. I try hard."

At the conclusion of his college career, Samoa was invited to play in the Hula Bowl all-star game as part of the West team after California Golden Bears quarterback Rich Campbell suffered a late-season injury. Samoa split time with Missouri Tigers quarterback Phil Bradley during the game, completing three passes for 34 yards while also rushing for 45 yards and two touchdowns. The West beat the East 24–17 and Samoa won the Hula Bowl offensive player of the game award.

== Professional career ==
Cincinnati Bengals owner Paul Brown and assistant general manager Mike Brown took note of Samoa after his performance in the Hula Bowl. Samoa's third cousin, and fellow American Samoan quarterback Jack Thompson, had also "raved" to Paul and Mike about Samoa. Samoa was selected by the Bengals in the ninth round, with the 230th overall pick, of the 1981 NFL draft. The Bengals projected him as a running back who could catch passes out of the backfield. Samoa joined his cousin Thompson on the Bengals in 1981. Prior to the draft, Samoa had told Thompson, "If I don't get drafted, I'm heading homeward (to American Samoa)." On August 22, in the third preseason game against the Chicago Bears, Samoa tore his Achilles tendon. He was placed on season-ending injured reserve on August 25, 1981. During the 1982 preseason, Samoa tried to make the team as a backup fullback. He stood 6'2" and weighed 207 pounds during his time with the Bengals. He was released on August 30, 1982, before the start of the 1982 regular season.

== Personal life ==
After his NFL career, Samoa spent some time coaching high school football in Southern California. He then returned to American Samoa and began a long career as a school administrator, teacher, and high school football coach. He was inducted into Long Beach City College's athletics hall of fame in 2007. Shortly before the COVID-19 pandemic, Samoa and his wife went to Seattle to visit their children. However, as a result of the pandemic, Samoa could not return to American Samoa. He decided to stay in Seattle permanently.
