= Tim Harris (running back) =

American football player (born 1961)

No. 43
- Position: Running back

Personal information
- Born: June 25, 1961 (age 65); Compton, California, U.S.
- Listed height: 5 ft 9 in (1.75 m)
- Listed weight: 206 lb (93 kg)

Career information
- High school: Compton
- College: Washington State (1979–1982)
- NFL draft: 1983: undrafted

Career history
- Pittsburgh Steelers (1983); Houston Oilers (1985)*; Seattle Seahawks (1987)
- * Offseason or practice squad member only

Awards and highlights
- 2× Second-team All-Pac-10 (1981, 1982)
- Stats at Pro Football Reference

Timothy Allen Harris (born June 15, 1961) is an American former professional football running back who played one season with the Pittsburgh Steelers of the National Football League (NFL). He played college football at Washington State University.

== Early life and college ==
Timothy Allen Harris was born on June 15, 1961, in Compton, California. He attended Compton High School in Compton.

Harris was a four-year letterman for the Washington State Cougars of Washington State University from 1979 to 1982. He rushed 67 times for 414 yards and two touchdowns as a freshman in 1979 while also catching two passes for nine yards and returning 18 kicks for 359 yards. In 1980, he recorded 167 carries for 801 yards and seven touchdown, and 16 receptions for 157 yards. His junior year in 1981, Harris totaled 157 rushing attempts for 915 yards and five touchdowns, and 12 catches for 71 yards, earning Coaches second-team All-Pac-10 honors. As a senior in 1982, he rushed 147 times for 684 yards and three touchdowns while also catching 18 passes for 126 yards, garnering Coaches second-team All-Pac-10 recognition for the second consecutive season.

== Professional career ==
After going undrafted in the 1983 NFL draft, Harris signed with the Pittsburgh Steelers on May 1. He was released on August 29, 1983, but re-signed the next day. He played in 14 games for the Steelers during the 1983 season, recording two carries for 15 yards, 18 kick returns for 289 yards, three punt returns for 12 yards, two fumbles, and one fumble recovery. Harris also appeared in one playoff game that year, recording one rushing attempt for two yards, one kick return for 19 yards, and one fumble. He was released by the Steelers on August 6, 1984.

Harris signed with the Houston Oilers. He was released on August 19, 1985.

On September 23, 1987, Harris was signed by the Seattle Seahawks during the 1987 NFL players strike. However, he did not play in any games for the Seahawks before being released.
