= J Torchio =

American football player (born 1960)

No. 11
- Position: Quarterback

Personal information
- Born: September 14, 1960 (age 66); Oakland, California, U.S.
- Listed height: 6 ft 2 in (1.88 m)
- Listed weight: 205 lb (93 kg)

Career information
- College: California (1980–1983)
- NFL draft: 1984: undrafted

Career history
- San Antonio Gunslingers (1984); Oakland Invaders (1985)

Career USFL statistics
- Comp. / Att.: 6 / 18
- Passing percentage: 33.3%
- Yards: 74
- TDs / INTs: 0 / 1
- Rushing yards: 18
- Rush avg.: 4.5

Lloyd J. Torchio II (born September 14, 1960) is an American former professional football player who was a quarterback for the San Antonio Gunslingers of the United States Football League (USFL). He played college football at California. He signed as an undrafted free agent by the Gunslingers.

== College career ==
Torchio attended the University of California, Berkeley, as a walk-on member of the Golden Bears football team from 1980 to 1983. In 1980, he appeared in 11 games. He completed 43-of-75 passing attempts (57.3%) for 644 yards, two touchdowns and three interceptions. That season, he was the winning quarterback in the Big Game against Stanford, led by future Pro Football Hall of Famer John Elway. In 1981, he started 11 games. He completed 155-of-363 passing attempts (42.7%) for 2,112 yards, nine touchdowns and 12 interceptions. In 1982, he returned to being a back-up and appeared in 11 games. He completed 57-of-123 passing attempts (46.3%) for 730 yards, three touchdowns and eight interceptions. In 1983, he appeared in 11 games. He completed 10-of-36 passing attempts (27.8%) for 155 yards, no touchdowns and four interceptions. He graduated with a Bachelor of Science degree in Business Administration.

== Professional career ==
After graduating from California, Berkeley, he signed with the San Antonio Gunslingers of the United States Football League (USFL) in 1984. In 1984, he appeared in three games. He completed 6-of-18 passing attempts (33.3%) for 74 yards, no touchdowns and one interception. He rushed the ball four times for 18 yards (4.5 avg.). In 1985, he joined the Oakland Invaders.

== Personal life ==
Torchio is the son of Lloyd J. Torchio, who played quarterback for the Golden Bears in 1947.

Toricho graduated with an MBA from the University of Southern California. He then began working at JP Morgan, where he worked for 12 years. Since, he has worked at Lafayette Capital Group where he is currently the company's corporate secretary. He is married to his wife Mary. They live in Lafayette, California and have three children.
