= Scott Tinsley =

American football player (born 1959)

No. 11
- Position: Quarterback

Personal information
- Born: November 14, 1959 (age 66); Oklahoma City, Oklahoma, U.S.
- Listed height: 6 ft 2 in (1.88 m)
- Listed weight: 195 lb (88 kg)

Career information
- High school: Putnam City West (Oklahoma City)
- College: USC
- NFL draft: 1983: undrafted

Career history
- Los Angeles Rams (1983–1986); Philadelphia Eagles (1987)

Career NFL statistics
- Passing attempts: 86
- Passing completions: 48
- Completion percentage: 55.8%
- TD–INT: 3–4
- Passing yards: 637
- Passer rating: 71.7
- Stats at Pro Football Reference

Scott Tinsley (born November 14, 1959) is an American former professional football player who was a quarterback who played for one season in the National Football League (NFL) for the Philadelphia Eagles in 1987. He was signed by the Los Angeles Rams as an undrafted free agent in 1984. He played college football for the USC Trojans.

== Professional career ==
=== Los Angeles Rams ===
Tinsley wa signed by the Los Angeles Rams as an undrafted free agent following the 1984 NFL draft. He was placed on the injured reserve list on August 21, 1984.

=== Philadelphia Eagles ===
Tinsley signed with the Philadelphia Eagles as a replacement player during the 1987 players strike. He played in 3 games and started 2. The Eagles lost all 3 games played with replacement players.
