= 1980 NCAA Division I-A football rankings =

- Season: 1980
- Bowl season: 1980–81 bowl games
- Preseason No. 1: Ohio State
- End of season champions: Georgia
- Conference with most teams in final AP poll: Big Ten, Pac-10, SEC (3)

Two human polls comprised the 1980 National Collegiate Athletic Association (NCAA) Division I-A football rankings. Unlike most sports, college football's governing body, the NCAA, does not bestow a national championship, instead that title is bestowed by one or more different polling agencies. There are two main weekly polls that begin in the preseason—the AP Poll and the Coaches Poll.with the Heisman winner George Rogers

== Legend ==
	Increase in ranking
	Decrease in ranking
	Not ranked previous week
	National champion
(#–#)	Win–loss record
(Italics)	Number of first place votes
т	Tied with team above or below also with this symbol

== AP Poll ==
	Preseason Aug 29	Week 1 Sep 6	Week 2 Sep 13	Week 3 Sep 20	Week 4 Sep 27	Week 5 Oct 4	Week 6 Oct 11	Week 7 Oct 18	Week 8 Oct 25	Week 9 Nov 1	Week 10 Nov 8	Week 11 Nov 15	Week 12 Nov 22	Week 13 Nov 29	Week 14 Dec 6	Week 15 (Final) Jan 3	
1.	Ohio State (36)	Ohio State (0–0)	Alabama (1–0)	Alabama (2–0)	Alabama (3–0)	Alabama (4–0)	Alabama (5–0)	Alabama (6–0)	Alabama (7–0)	Notre Dame (7–0)	Georgia (9–0)	Georgia (10–0)	Georgia (10–0)	Georgia (11–0)	Georgia (11–0)	Georgia (12–0) (58 1/2)	1.
2.	Alabama (24)	Alabama (1–0)	Ohio State (1–0)	Ohio State (2–0)	Ohio State (3–0)	USC (4–0)	USC (5–0)	Texas (5–0)	UCLA (6–0)	Georgia (8–0)	USC (7–0–1)	Notre Dame (8–0–1)	Notre Dame (9–0–1)	Notre Dame (9–0–1)	Florida State (10–1)	Pittsburgh (11–1) (3 1/2)	2.
3.	Pittsburgh (3)	Pittsburgh (0–0)	Oklahoma (1–0)	Nebraska (2–0)	Nebraska (3–0)	Texas (4–0)	Texas (5–0)	UCLA (5–0)	Notre Dame (6–0)	Florida State (8–1)	Florida State (9–1)	Florida State (9–1)	Florida State (9–1)	Florida State (9–1)	Pittsburgh (10–1)	Oklahoma (10–2)	3.
4.	USC (1)	Oklahoma (0–0)	USC (1–0)	Oklahoma (1–0)	USC (3–0)	Pittsburgh (4–0)	UCLA (5–0)	Notre Dame (5–0)	Georgia (7–0)	USC (6–0–1)	Nebraska (8–1)	Nebraska (9–1)	Pittsburgh (10–1)	Pittsburgh (10–1)	Oklahoma (9–2)	Michigan (10–2)	4.
5.	Oklahoma (1)	USC (0–0)	Pittsburgh (1–0)	USC (2–0)	Texas (3–0)	UCLA (4–0)	Notre Dame (4–0)	Georgia (6–0)	Florida State (7–1)	Nebraska (7–1)	Alabama (8–1)	Ohio State (9–1)	Penn State (9–2)	Oklahoma (9–2)	Michigan (9–2)	Florida State (10–2) (1)	5.
6.	Arkansas	Texas (1–0)	Nebraska (1–0)	Pittsburgh (2–0)	Pittsburgh (3–0)	Georgia (4–0)	Georgia (5–0)	Florida State (6–1)	North Carolina (7–0)	Alabama (7–1)	Notre Dame (7–0–1)	Pittsburgh (9–1)	Oklahoma (8–2)	Michigan (9–2)	Baylor (10–1)	Alabama (10–2)	6.
7.	Nebraska	Notre Dame (1–0)	Texas (1–0)	Texas (2–0)	Notre Dame (2–0)	Notre Dame (3–0)	Florida State (5–1)	North Carolina (6–0)	USC (5–0–1)	Ohio State (7–1)	Ohio State (8–1)	Penn State (9–1)	Michigan (9–2)	Baylor (10–1)	Notre Dame (9–1–1)	Nebraska (10–2)	7.
8.	Houston	Nebraska (0–0)	Notre Dame (1–0)	Notre Dame (2–0)	Georgia (4–0)	North Carolina (4–0)	North Carolina (5–0)	USC (5–0–1)	Nebraska (6–1)	UCLA (6–1)	Pittsburgh (8–1)	Alabama (8–2)	Baylor (10–1)	Alabama (9–2)	Nebraska (9–2)	Penn State (10–2)	8.
9.	Purdue	Houston (0–0)	Florida State (2–0)	Florida State (3–0)	Missouri (3–0)	Ohio State (3–1)	Ohio State (4–1)	Nebraska (5–1)	Ohio State (6–1)	Pittsburgh (7–1)	Penn State (8–1)	Oklahoma (7–2)	Alabama (8–2)	Nebraska (9–2)	Alabama (9–2)	Notre Dame (9–2–1)	9.
10.	Texas	Florida State (1–0)	Georgia (2–0)	Georgia (3–0)	North Carolina (3–0)	Nebraska (3–1)	Nebraska (4–1)	Ohio State (5–1)	Baylor (7–0)	Penn State (7–1)	Oklahoma (6–2)	Michigan (8–2)	Nebraska (9–2)	Penn State (9–2)	Penn State (9–2)	North Carolina (11–1)	10.
11.	Notre Dame	Michigan (1–0)	Stanford (2–0)	Penn State (2–0)	UCLA (3–0)	Florida State (4–1)	Pittsburgh (4–1)	Baylor (6–0)	Pittsburgh (6–1)	Oklahoma (5–2)	Michigan (7–2)	Baylor (9–1)	Ohio State (9–2)	Ohio State (9–2)	Ohio State (9–2)	USC (8–2–1)	11.
12.	Michigan	Georgia (1–0)	Penn State (1–0)	Missouri (2–0)	Oklahoma (1–1)	Oklahoma (2–1)	Penn State (4–1)	Pittsburgh (5–1)	Texas (5–1)	Michigan (6–2)	Baylor (8–1)	USC (7–1–1)	BYU (10–1)	North Carolina (10–1)	USC (8–2–1)	BYU (12–1)	12.
13.	Florida State	Stanford (1–0)	North Carolina (2–0)	Washington (2–0)	Miami (FL) (4–0)	Miami (FL) (4–0)	Baylor (5–0)	Penn State (5–1)	Penn State (6–1)	BYU (7–1)	BYU (8–1)	BYU (9–1)	North Carolina (10–1)	BYU (11–1)	North Carolina (10–1)	UCLA (9–2)	13.
14.	North Carolina	Penn State (1–0)	Michigan (1-1)	North Carolina (2–0)	Arkansas (2–1)	Penn State (3–1)	Arkansas (4–1)	South Carolina (6–1)	South Carolina (6–1)	North Carolina (7–1)	South Carolina (7–2)	South Carolina (8–2)	UCLA (8–2)	UCLA (9–2)	BYU (11–1)	Baylor (10–2)	14.
15.	Stanford	North Carolina (1–0)	Missouri (1–0)	Arkansas (1–1)	Stanford (3–1)	Arkansas (3–1)	South Carolina (5–1)	Arkansas (4–1)	Missouri (6–1)	South Carolina (6–2)	North Carolina (8–1)	North Carolina (9–1)	Washington (9–2)	Washington (9–2)	UCLA (9–2)	Ohio State (9–3)	15.
16.	Georgia	Arkansas (0–1)	Washington (1–0)	UCLA (2–0)	Florida State (3–1)	Stanford (4–1)	Missouri (4–1)	Missouri (5–1)	Oklahoma (4–2)	Baylor (7–1)	Purdue (7–2)	Washington (8–2)	Mississippi State (9–2)	Mississippi State (9–2)	Washington (9–2)	Washington (9–3)	16.
17.	Missouri	Missouri (0–0)	Arkansas (0–1)	Michigan (1-2)	Penn State (2–1)	South Carolina (4–1)	Oklahoma (2–2)	Oklahoma (3–2)	BYU (6–1)	Purdue (6–2)	UCLA (6–2)	Mississippi State (8–2)	USC (7–2–1)	USC (7–2–1)	Mississippi State (9–2)	Purdue (9–3)	17.
18.	Penn State	Auburn (0–0)	Houston (0–1)	Auburn (2–0)	South Carolina (3–1)	Baylor (4–0)	Miami (FL) (4–1)	Washington (5–1)	Michigan (5–2)	SMU (6–2)	SMU (7–2)	UCLA (7–2)	Florida (7–2)	South Carolina (8–3)	South Carolina (8–3)	Miami (FL) (9–3)	18.
19.	Auburn	Washington (0–0)	Auburn (1–0)	Maryland (3–0)	Florida (3–0)	Missouri (3–1)	Iowa State (5–0)	BYU (5–1)	SMU (5–2)	Mississippi State (7–2)	Mississippi State (7–2)	Florida (7–2)	South Carolina (8–3)	SMU (8–3)	SMU (8–3)	Mississippi State (9–3)	19.
20.	Washington	Purdue (0–1)	South Carolina (2–0)	Arizona State (2–0)	Baylor (3–0)	SMU (4–0)	Stanford (4–2)	Southern Miss (6–0)	Purdue (5–2)	Florida (6–1)	Florida (6–2)	Texas (7–2)	SMU (8–3)	Miami (FL) (8–3)	Miami (FL) (8–3)	SMU (8–4)	20.
	Preseason Aug 29	Week 1 Sep 6	Week 2 Sep 13	Week 3 Sep 20	Week 4 Sep 27	Week 5 Oct 4	Week 6 Oct 11	Week 7 Oct 18	Week 8 Oct 25	Week 9 Nov 1	Week 10 Nov 8	Week 11 Nov 15	Week 12 Nov 22	Week 13 Nov 29	Week 14 Dec 6	Week 15 (Final) Jan 3	
		None	Dropped: Purdue	Dropped: Stanford; Houston; South Carolina	Dropped: Washington; Michigan; Auburn; Maryland; Arizona State	Dropped: Florida	Dropped: SMU	Dropped: Miami; Iowa State; Stanford	Dropped: Arkansas; Washington; Southern Miss	Dropped: Texas; Missouri	None	Dropped: Purdue; SMU	Dropped: Texas	Dropped: Florida	None	Dropped: South Carolina	

== Coaches Poll ==
	Preseason Preseason	Week 1 Sep 6	Week 2 Sep 13	Week 3 Sep 20	Week 4 Sep 27	Week 5 Oct 4	Week 6 Oct 11	Week 7 Oct 18	Week 8 Oct 25	Week 9 Nov 1	Week 10 Nov 8	Week 11 Nov 15	Week 12 Nov 22	Week 13 Nov 29	Week 14 Dec 6	Week 15 (Final) Jan 4	
1.	Ohio State (21)	Ohio State (0–0) (21)	Alabama (1–0) (19)	Alabama (2–0) (22)	Alabama (3–0) (26)	Alabama (4–0) (39)	Alabama (5–0) (29)	Alabama (6–0) (36)	Alabama (7–0) (35)	Notre Dame (7–0) (29)	Georgia (9–0) (34)	Georgia (10–0) (36)	Georgia (10–0) (40)	Georgia (11–0) (35)	Georgia (11–0) (37)	Georgia (12–0) (36)	1.
2.	Alabama (14)	Alabama (1–0) (16)	Ohio State (1–0) (21)	Ohio State (2–0) (14)	Ohio State (3–0) (8)	USC (4–0)	USC (5–0) (7)	Texas (5–0) (2)	UCLA (6–0) (5)	Georgia (8–0) (11)	USC (7–0–1) (4)	Notre Dame (8–0–1) (4)	Notre Dame (9–0–1) (2)	Notre Dame (9–0–1) (2)	Florida State (10–1) (1)	Pittsburgh (11–1) (3)	2.
3.	Oklahoma (1)	Oklahoma (0–0) (1)	Oklahoma (1–0)	Nebraska (2–0) (5)	Nebraska (3–0) (8)	Pittsburgh (4–0) (2)	Texas (5–0) (3)	UCLA (5–0) (3)	Notre Dame (6–0) (2)	USC (6–0–1) (1)	Nebraska (8–1) (2)	Nebraska (9–1) (2)	Florida State (9–1)	Florida State (9–1)	Pittsburgh (10–1) (1)	Oklahoma (10–2)	3.
4.	Pittsburgh (5)	Pittsburgh (0–0) (3)	USC (1–0)	Oklahoma (1–0)	USC (3–0)	Texas (4–0)	UCLA (5–0) (2)	Notre Dame (5–0) (1)	Georgia (7–0)	Florida State (8–1)	Florida State (9–1)	Florida State (9–1)	Pittsburgh (9–1)	Pittsburgh (10–1) (1)	Oklahoma (9–2)	Michigan (10–2) (1)	4.
5.	USC	USC (0–0)	Texas (1–0) (1)	USC (2–0)	Texas (3–0)	UCLA (4–0) (1)	Notre Dame (4–0) (1)	Georgia (6–0)	Florida State (7–1)	Nebraska (7–1) (1)	Alabama (8–1)	Ohio State (9–1)	Penn State (9–1)	Oklahoma (9–2)	Michigan (9–2)	Florida State (10–2)	5.
6.	Houston	Texas (1–0) (1)	Nebraska (1–0)	Texas (2–0)	Pittsburgh (3–0)	Georgia (4–0)	Georgia (5–0)	Florida State (6–1)	North Carolina (7–0)	Alabama (7–1)	Ohio State (8–1)	Pittsburgh (9–1)	Oklahoma (8–2)	Michigan (9–2)	Alabama (9–2)	Alabama (10–2)	6.
7.	Nebraska (1)	Nebraska (0–0)	Pittsburgh (1–0) (1)	Notre Dame (2–0) (1)	Notre Dame (2–0)	Notre Dame (3–0)	Florida State (5–1)	North Carolina (6–0)	Nebraska (6–1)	Ohio State (7–1)	Notre Dame (7–0–1) (1)	Penn State (9–1)	Michigan (9–2)	Baylor (10–1)	Baylor (10–1)	Nebraska (10–2)	7.
8.	Arkansas	Notre Dame (1–0)	Notre Dame (1–0)	Pittsburgh (2–0)	Georgia (4–0)	North Carolina (4–0)	North Carolina (5–0)	Nebraska (5–1)	USC (5–0–1)	Pittsburgh (7–1)	Pittsburgh (8–1)	Baylor (9–1)	Baylor (10–1)	Alabama (9–2)	Notre Dame (8–1–1)	Penn State (10–2)	8.
9.	Texas	Houston (0–0)	Georgia (2–0)	Florida State (3–0)	Missouri (3–0)	Nebraska (3–1)	Nebraska (4–1)	USC (5–0–1)	Ohio State (6–1)	UCLA (6–1)	Penn State (8–1)	Oklahoma (7–2)	Alabama (8–2)	Nebraska (9–2)	Nebraska (9–2)	North Carolina (11–1)	9.
10.	Purdue	Michigan (0–0)	Florida State (2–0)	Georgia (3–0)	UCLA (3–0)	Florida State (4–1)	Ohio State (4–1)	Ohio State (5–1)	Pittsburgh (6–1)	Penn State (7–1)	Baylor (8–1)	Alabama (8–2)	Nebraska (9–2)	Penn State (9–2)	Penn State (9–2)	Notre Dame (9–2–1)	10.
11.	Michigan	Florida State (1–0)	Penn State (1–0)	Penn State (2–0)	North Carolina (3–0)	Ohio State (3–1)	Pittsburgh (4–1)	Pittsburgh (5–1)	Baylor (7–0)	Oklahoma (5–2)	Oklahoma (6–2)	Michigan (8–2)	North Carolina (10–1)	North Carolina (10–1)	North Carolina (10–1)	BYU (12–1)	11.
12.	Notre Dame	Penn State (1–0)	Michigan (1–0)	Missouri (2–0)	Oklahoma (1–1)	Oklahoma (2–1)	Penn State (4–1)	Penn State (5–1)	Texas (5–1)	Michigan (6–2)	Michigan (7–2)	USC (7–1–1)	Ohio State (9–2)	UCLA (9–2)	UCLA (9–2)	USC (8–2–1)	12.
13.	Penn State	North Carolina (1–0)	North Carolina (2–0)	Washington (2–0)	Miami (FL) (4–0)	Miami (FL) (4–0)	Baylor (5–0)	Baylor (6–0)	Penn State (6–1)	South Carolina (6–2)	BYU (8–1)	North Carolina (9–1)	BYU (10–1)	Ohio State (9–2)	USC (8–2–1)	Baylor (10–2)	13.
14.	Stanford	Stanford (1–0)	Stanford (2–0)	UCLA (2–0)	Penn State (2–1)	Penn State (4–1)	South Carolina (5–1)	Arkansas (4–1)	South Carolina (6–1)	North Carolina (7–1)	South Carolina (7–2)	BYU (8–1)	UCLA (8–2)	BYU (11–1)	Ohio State (9–2)	UCLA (9–2)	14.
15.	Washington	Georgia (1–0)	Washington (1–0)	North Carolina (2–0)	South Carolina (3–1)	Baylor (4–0)	Arkansas (4–1)	South Carolina (6–1)	Missouri (6–1)	Baylor (7–1)	North Carolina (8–1)	South Carolina (8–2)	Washington (9–2)	Washington (9–2)	BYU (11–1)	Ohio State (9–3)	15.
16.	Florida State	Arkansas (0–1)	Missouri (1–0)	Arkansas (1–1)	Arkansas (2–1)	Stanford (4–1)	Iowa State (5–0)	Missouri (5–1)	Oklahoma (4–2)	BYU (7–1)	Purdue (7–2)	Mississippi State (8–2)	Mississippi State (9–2)	Mississippi State (9–2)	Washington (9–2)	Purdue (9–3)	16.
17.	North Carolina	Missouri (0–0)	UCLA (1–0)	Michigan (1–1)	Stanford (3–1)	South Carolina (4–1)	Missouri (4–1)	Oklahoma (3–2)	BYU (6–1)	Mississippi State (7–2)	Mississippi State (7–2)	Washington (8–2)	USC (7–2–1)	USC (7–2–1)	Mississippi State (9–2)	Washington (9–3)	17.
18.	Missouri	Washington (0–0)	South Carolina (2–0)	Arizona State (2–0)	Florida State (3–1)	Arkansas (3–1)	Oklahoma (2–2)	BYU (5–1)	Michigan (5–2)	Texas (5–2)	UCLA (6–2)	Texas (7–2)	Florida (7–2)	South Carolina (8–3)	South Carolina (8–3)	Miami (FL) (9–3)	18.
19.	BYU	Texas A&M (1–0)	Houston (0–1)	Miami (FL) (3–0)	Baylor (3–0)	Missouri (3–1)	Miami (FL) (4–1)	Washington (5–1)	Arkansas (4–2)	Purdue (6–2)	Texas (6–2)	UCLA (7–2)	SMU (8–3)	Maryland (8–3)	SMU (8–3)	Florida (9–3)	19.
20.	Georgia	South Carolina (1–0)	Arkansas (0–1)	Baylor (2–0)	Florida (3–0)	Iowa State (4–0)	BYU (4–1)	Southern Miss (6–0)	Purdue (5–2)	Florida (6–1)	Washington (7–2)	Florida (7–2)	Texas (7–3)	SMU (8–3)	Maryland (8–3)	SMU (8–4)	20.
	Preseason Preseason	Week 1 Sep 6	Week 2 Sep 13	Week 3 Sep 20	Week 4 Sep 27	Week 5 Oct 4	Week 6 Oct 11	Week 7 Oct 18	Week 8 Oct 25	Week 9 Nov 1	Week 10 Nov 8	Week 11 Nov 15	Week 12 Nov 22	Week 13 Nov 29	Week 14 Dec 6	Week 15 (Final) Jan 4	
		Dropped: Purdue; BYU	Dropped: Texas A&M	Dropped: Stanford; South Carolina; Houston	Dropped: Washington; Michigan; Arizona State	Dropped: Florida	Dropped: Stanford	Dropped: Iowa State; Miami (FL)	Dropped: Washington; Southern Miss	Dropped: Missouri; Arkansas	Dropped: Florida	Dropped: Purdue	Dropped: South Carolina	Dropped: Florida; Texas	None	Dropped: Mississippi State; South Carolina; Maryland	
