= Florida–Georgia football rivalry =

American college football rivalry

Florida-Georgia football rivalry

- Florida Gators Georgia Bulldogs
- Sport: College football
- First meeting: October 15, 1904; Georgia, 52–0 (per UGA); November 6, 1915; Georgia, 37–0 (per UF)
- Latest meeting: October 31, 2026; Georgia, 27–8
- Next meeting: October 30, 2027
- Stadiums: EverBank Stadium, Jacksonville, Florida (1996–2025, 2028–2031); Raymond James Stadium, Tampa, Florida (2027); Mercedes-Benz Stadium, Atlanta, Georgia (2026); Sanford Stadium, Athens, Georgia (1932, 1995); Ben Hill Griffin Stadium, Gainesville, Florida (1931, 1994); Gator Bowl Stadium, Jacksonville, Florida (1927, 1929, 1933–1993); Municipal Stadium, Savannah, Georgia (1928, 1930); Sanford Field, Athens, Georgia (1916, 1920, 1926); Plant Field, Tampa, Florida (1919); Barrs Field, Jacksonville, Florida (1915)
- Trophy: Okefenokee Oar

Statistics
- Total meetings: 104 (per Florida); 105 (per Georgia)
- All-time series: Georgia leads 58–44–2 (per Florida); Georgia leads 59–44–2 (per Georgia)
- Largest victory: Georgia, 75–0 (1942)
- Longest win streak: Florida, 7 (1990–1996); Georgia, 7 (1941–1948)
- Current win streak: Georgia, 6 (2021–present)

Relative locations of UF, UGA, and Jacksonville

The Florida–Georgia football rivalry (Note: Also known as the Georgia–Florida football rivalry) is an American college football rivalry game played annually by the University of Florida Gators and the University of Georgia Bulldogs, both members of the Southeastern Conference (SEC). The programs first met in 1904 and have played every season since 1926 except for a war-time interruption in 1943. It is one of the most prominent rivalry games in college football, and it has been held in Jacksonville, Florida, since 1933, with only three exceptions, making it one of the few remaining neutral-site rivalries in college football. The game attracts huge crowds to Jacksonville, and the associated tailgating and other events earned it the nickname of the "World's Largest Outdoor Cocktail Party", although that name has not been officially used since 2006, as the schools and the SEC did not want to be seen as promoting excessive alcohol consumption.

Though highly contested on both sides, the rivalry has gone through several periods in which one team dominated for more than a decade. Georgia dominated the early series while Florida held the advantage in the 1950s and early 1960s. Georgia again dominated from the late 1960s through the 80s under coach Vince Dooley, while Florida again took the upper hand in the rivalry during the 1990s and early 2000s under coaches Steve Spurrier and Urban Meyer. The series was uncharacteristically even over twelve seasons beginning in 2008, with the rivals enjoying and then suffering through alternating sets of three-game win streaks. After winning in 2026, Georgia has won nine out of the last ten meetings under coach Kirby Smart.

== Series history ==
=== Disputed beginnings ===
The two universities do not agree on the date of their first gridiron meeting. Georgia's football program was established in 1892, and in 1904, the Red and Black defeated the University of Florida Blue and White by the lopsided score of 52–0. However, this was not the current University of Florida, but a predecessor school based in Lake City which had been known as Florida Agricultural College (FAC) for twenty years before its name was changed in 1903 to reflect its expanded course offerings. FAC ceased to exist after the 1904–05 academic year, as Florida's Buckman Act merged it with three additional state-supported schools to establish the modern University of Florida in Gainesville. The new school opened in 1905 and established a football program in 1906. UF does not include games played by its four predecessor institutions in its official sports records, including Georgia's win over the University of Florida at Lake City.

Georgia, on the other hand, counts the 1904 game as a victory against its future rival. UGA sports historian Dan Magill sums up the school's attitude: "That's where Florida was back then. We can't help it if they got run out of Lake City."

The first game in the rivalry acknowledged by both schools took place in Jacksonville in 1915. The series has been played annually since 1926 except in 1943, when Florida did not field a team due to World War II.

=== Series trends ===
Georgia dominated the early rivalry. Florida did not score a single point against the Bulldogs until their fifth (or sixth) meeting. The Gators won their first two games against Georgia in 1928 and 1929, when coach Charlie Bachman's squads briefly brought Florida's football program to national prominence. However, after a scoreless tie in 1930, Georgia resumed its dominance, winning fifteen out of the next seventeen games in the series as coach Wally Butts led the Bulldogs to several SEC championships while the Gators suffered through a period of mediocrity in the 1930s and 1940s.

Florida finally enjoyed longer-term success in the rivalry in the 1950s under coach Bob Woodruff, a trend that continued into the 1960s under coach Ray Graves. The hiring of new Georgia coach Vince Dooley in 1964 evened the rivalry for the remainder of the decade, and in the 1970s and 1980s, his Bulldog squads usually won the game in Jacksonville while winning a national championship in 1980 along the way. Coach Steve Spurrier's arrival in Gainesville turned the rivalry back around beginning in 1990, and his Gator squads went 11–1 against the Bulldogs. Coach Urban Meyer continued Florida's winning trend through the mid-2000s, but the rivalry was unusually even between 2008-2019. Florida began a three game series win streak in 2008, which was followed by a three game Georgia streak, then another three game streak for Florida, which was answered by three Georgia wins, marking the longest evenly-divided dozen years in series history. As of the 2024 meeting, Georgia has won seven out of the last eight meetings, with current head coach Kirby Smart holding a 7-2 record against the Gators.

=== Conference implications & upsets ===
Since the 1960s, the Florida–Georgia rivalry often held conference or national championship implications for one or both teams, and both schools have had title hopes dashed in the game, sometimes in a surprising upset. In 1966, the Bulldogs intercepted 3 passes by eventual Heisman Trophy winner Steve Spurrier, derailing the Gators' conference title hopes in a 27–10 upset. Florida's SEC title hopes were similarly dashed by the Bulldogs in 1975 and 1976, and their first ever stint atop the AP poll ended after one week in 1985 with a loss in Jacksonville. In 2002, Florida turned the tables by posting a major upset win over Georgia. It was the Bulldogs' only blemish on the season and likely cost them a chance to play for the national championship.

The rivalry took on even more importance when the SEC split into divisions in 1992. Both teams were placed in the SEC East, and the late season rivalry game often decided who would represent their division in the SEC Championship Game. This dynamic began quickly, as Florida's upset win over Georgia in 1992 cost the Bulldogs a berth in the inaugural SEC championship game. Subsequent rivalry losses in 2008, 2014, and 2020 also knocked the Bulldogs out of the SEC East race, while Georgia's win over an undefeated Gator squad in 2012 similarly knocked Florida out of championship contention. Over 32 SEC championship games during the league's division era, Florida represented the SEC East on thirteen occasions, Georgia in twelve.

The SEC dropped the division format for football when it expanded to 16 member schools in 2024. While the move to a nine game conference schedule beginning in 2026 disrupted many long-standing annual rivalries, the league preserved the Florida-Georgia game as a yearly affair.

== Rivalry traditions ==
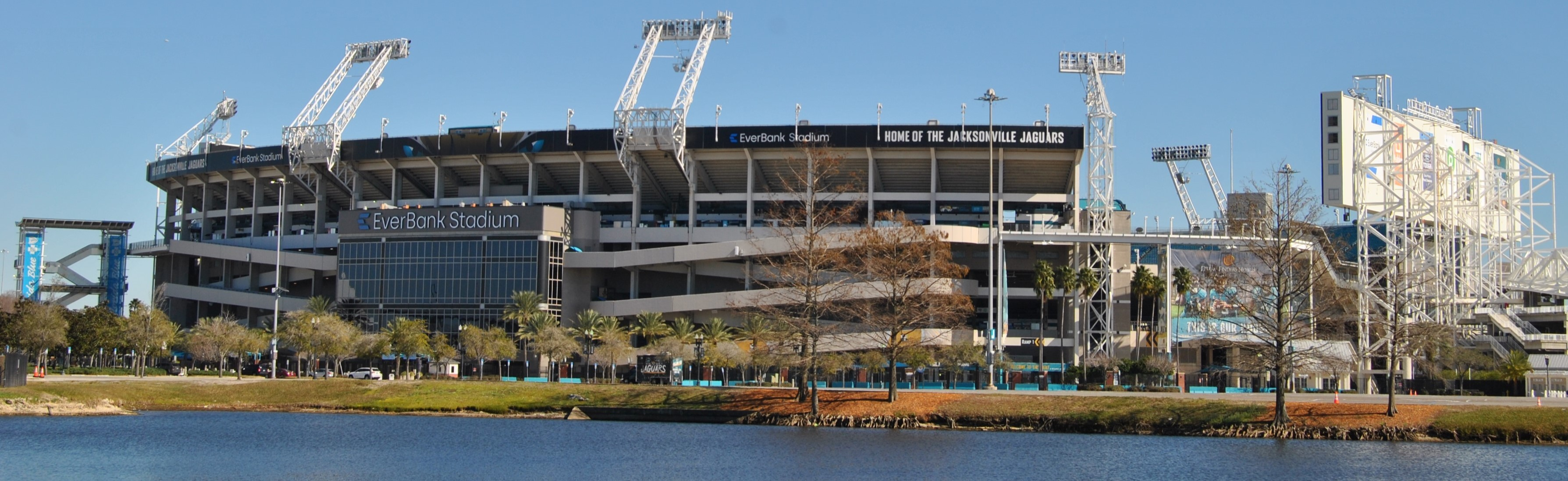
Everbank Stadium (1996–present)

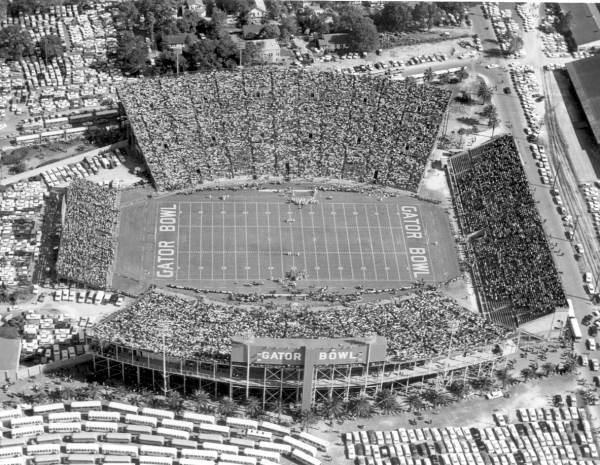
Gator Bowl Stadium (1933–1993)

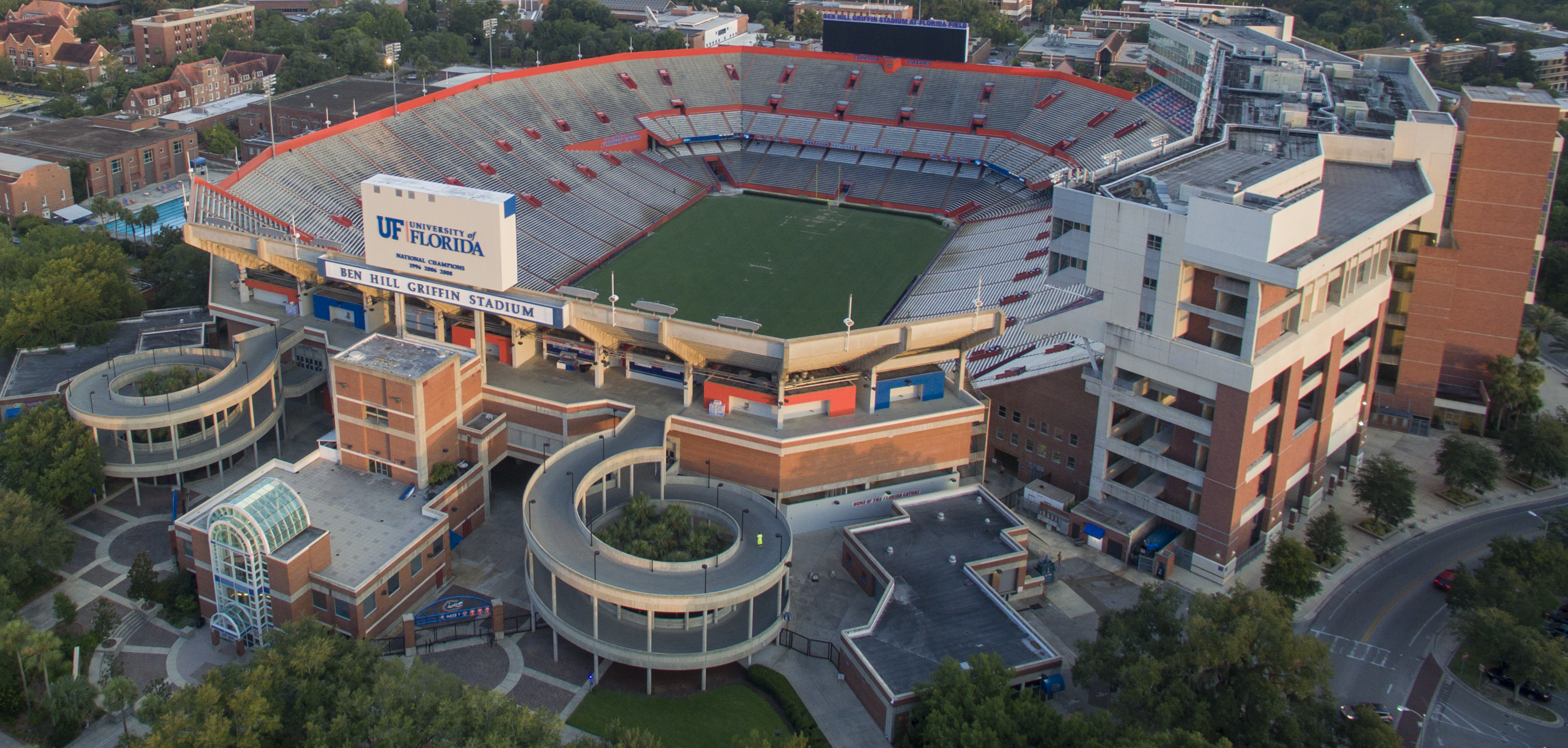
Ben Hill Griffin Stadium (1994)

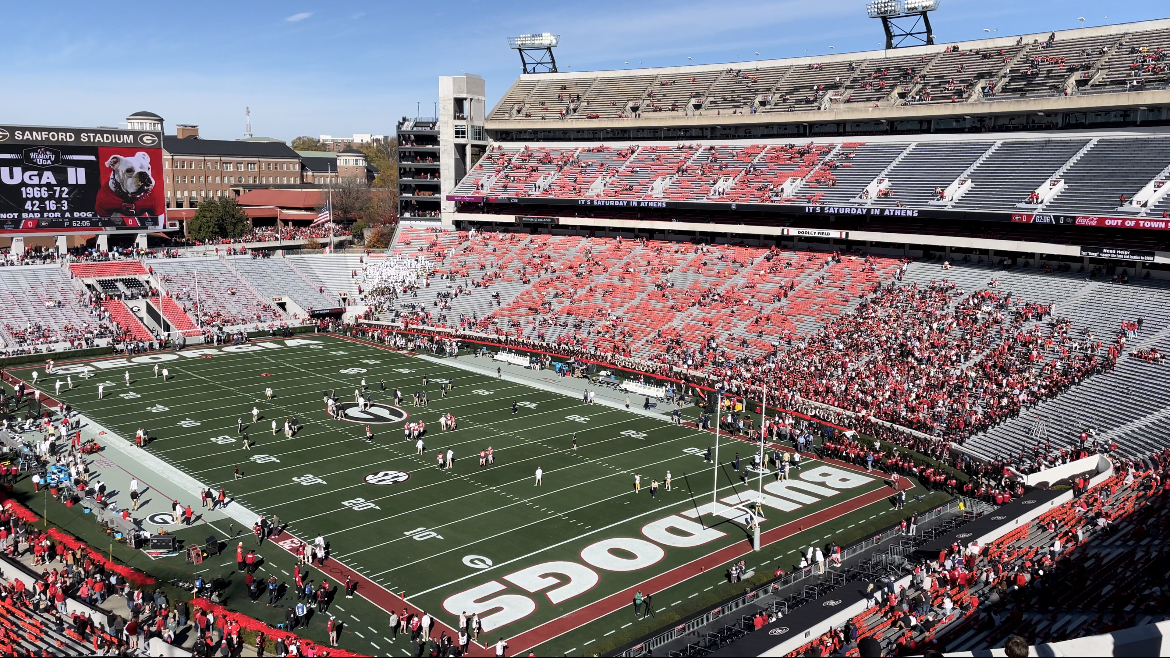
Sanford Stadium (1995)

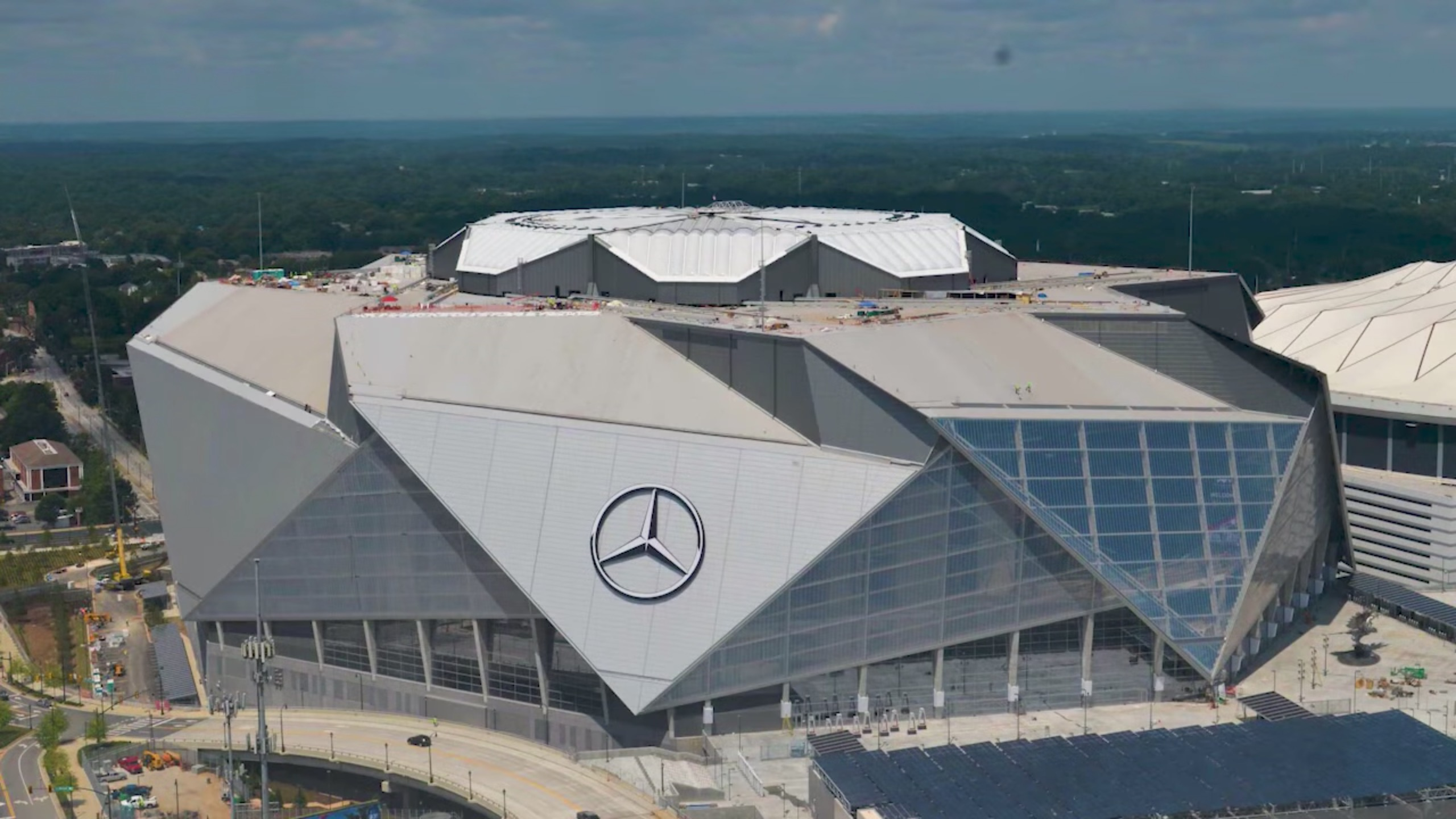
Mercedes Benz Stadium (2026)

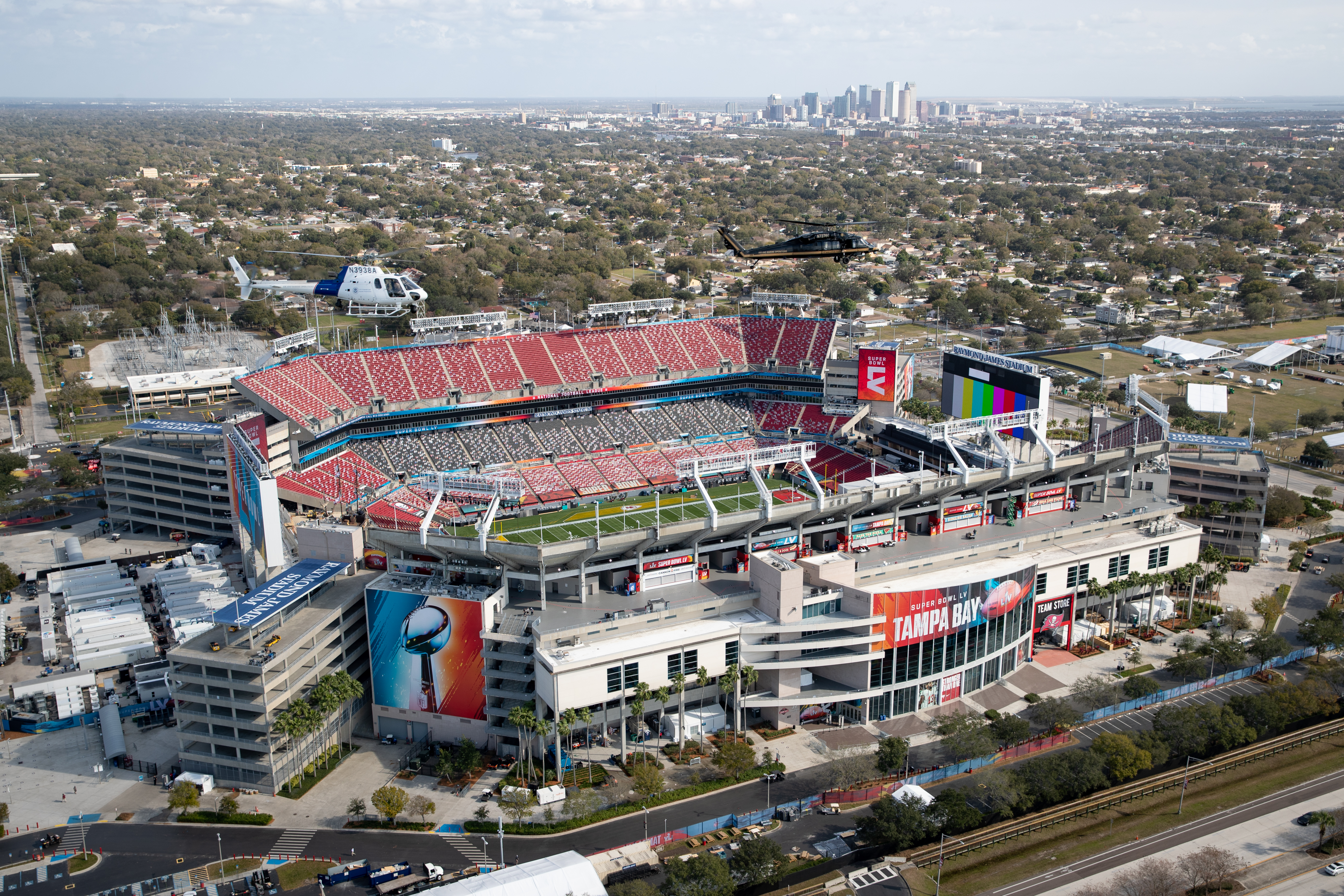
Raymond James Stadium (2027)

=== Site of the game ===
The Florida-Georgia game has been played in Jacksonville almost every season since 1933. This neutral site trend began very early in the series; in over 100 meetings, the rivalry has been played at on-campus facilities on just seven occasions.

Florida's original football facility of Fleming Field was quite small and primitive, so early Gator squads regularly scheduled "home" games against major college opposition in various cities across the state. Early Florida-Georgia contests were held in Jacksonville (three times), Savannah (twice), and Tampa (once), along with several Georgia home games in Athens. (The disputed 1904 game was played in Macon, Georgia, another neutral site.)

Florida Field opened in 1930, the Bulldogs made their first trip to Gainesville in 1931, and the Gators made a return visit to Athens in 1932. The schools agreed to meet in Jacksonville in 1933, and the game has been played there every subsequent season except for 1994 and 1995, when the old Gator Bowl stadium was demolished and the current EverBank Stadium built on the same site for the expansion Jacksonville Jaguars of the NFL. The Florida/Georgia game was held in Gainesville in 1994, in Athens in 1995, and then returned to Jacksonville in 1996.

There have been some calls to move the game from Jacksonville over the years, usually when one or the other school was dominating the rivalry. More recently, Georgia coach Kirby Smart has argued that playing at a neutral site cost both programs a valuable home recruiting weekend every other year. However, the schools have repeatedly extended their agreement to play in Jacksonville, both for tradition's sake and because the neutral-site contest has become quite lucrative for the universities. Florida and Georgia have long split ticket revenue for the game, and in 2019, the city of Jacksonville agreed to compensate the schools for the loss of a home game by paying all travel expenses plus a $1 million per year bonus, a figure which increases to $1.5 million in 2024. As of the latest renewal agreement, each university makes almost $4 million from the game every year, far more than the approximately $3 million every other year they would earn from a home-and-home series.

In 2026 and 2027, the rivalry will again leave Jacksonville for two seasons due to a major renovation of Everbank Stadium. However, unlike in the 1990s, it will not be played at the schools' on-campus facilities, but will instead shift to other neutral sites: Atlanta's Mercedes-Benz Stadium in 2026 and Tampa's Raymond James Stadium in 2027. The game will return to Jacksonville in 2028, with the most recent contract renewal keeping the rivalry in the city until at least 2031.

=== "World's Largest Outdoor Cocktail Party" ===
The city of Jacksonville is willing to provide financial guarantees to keep the rivalry in town because the game weekend is extremely lucrative for local businesses, drawing thousands of fans to a community that is more known for its naval base and heavy industry than for tourism. Local hotels fill to near capacity, downtown and the Jacksonville Landing along the St. Johns River hosts festivities on Friday and Saturday, and the area around the stadium is alive with tailgating and other happenings on game day.

Besides Jacksonville, the Georgia Golden Isles also depend on the game to sustain businesses through the winter season. Georgia students and alumni spend the game weekend on the Georgia Coast, particularly on Saint Simons Island, where thousands of Georgia students gather each year at the aptly named "Frat Beach" on Friday before commuting to Jacksonville the next day.

As a result of the festive atmosphere, the game and associated revelry was once known as "the World's Largest Outdoor Cocktail Party", a nickname coined in 1958 by then Florida Times-Union sports editor Bill Kastelz after he witnessed an inebriated fan cheerfully offer an alcoholic beverage to an on-duty police officer before the game. The "Cocktail Party" moniker proved so popular that the City of Jacksonville used it officially for many years, but the practice ended in the 1980s following a series of alcohol-fueled outbursts. In 1984, Florida fans stormed the field and tore down the goal posts after a 27–0 victory; the following year, a 24–3 Georgia win led Bulldogs fans to do the same, resulting in dozens of arrests and several injuries on both occasions. Thereafter, the city cracked down on excessive drinking and dropped the name, though the media continued to use it until 2006, when both schools and the Southeastern Conference asked CBS Sports (which had the SEC football TV broadcast contract in 2006) to stop using the nickname due to concerns about alcohol abuse by students and other attendees.

Since then, the rivalry has simply been called the "Florida–Georgia game" or "Georgia–Florida game", with some entities (including the Florida Times-Union, which initiated the Cocktail Party nickname) rotating the names each year to list the designated home team first. Since 2009, the respective student government associations of the institutions have referred to the game as the War for the Oar, as the winning team takes home the Okefenokee Oar.

=== Home teams and seating ===
The designated "home" team alternates from year to year, with ticket distribution split evenly between the fans of the two teams. Beginning in the late 1980s, fans from Florida and Georgia were assigned seats grouped in alternating sections of the stadium to minimize incidents, and the contrasting colors worn by the fans (red and black for Georgia, orange and blue for Florida) created a "beach ball" visual effect in the stands. More recently, the seating arrangement has split the stadium lengthwise and fans sit on the side corresponding to the sideline their team occupies. The teams take turns serving as the "home" team, with the "hosts" usually wearing their home uniforms and the visitors wearing white road jerseys. However, on several occasions, the Bulldogs and Gators have faced off with both squads wearing their home uniforms.

=== Okefenokee Oar ===
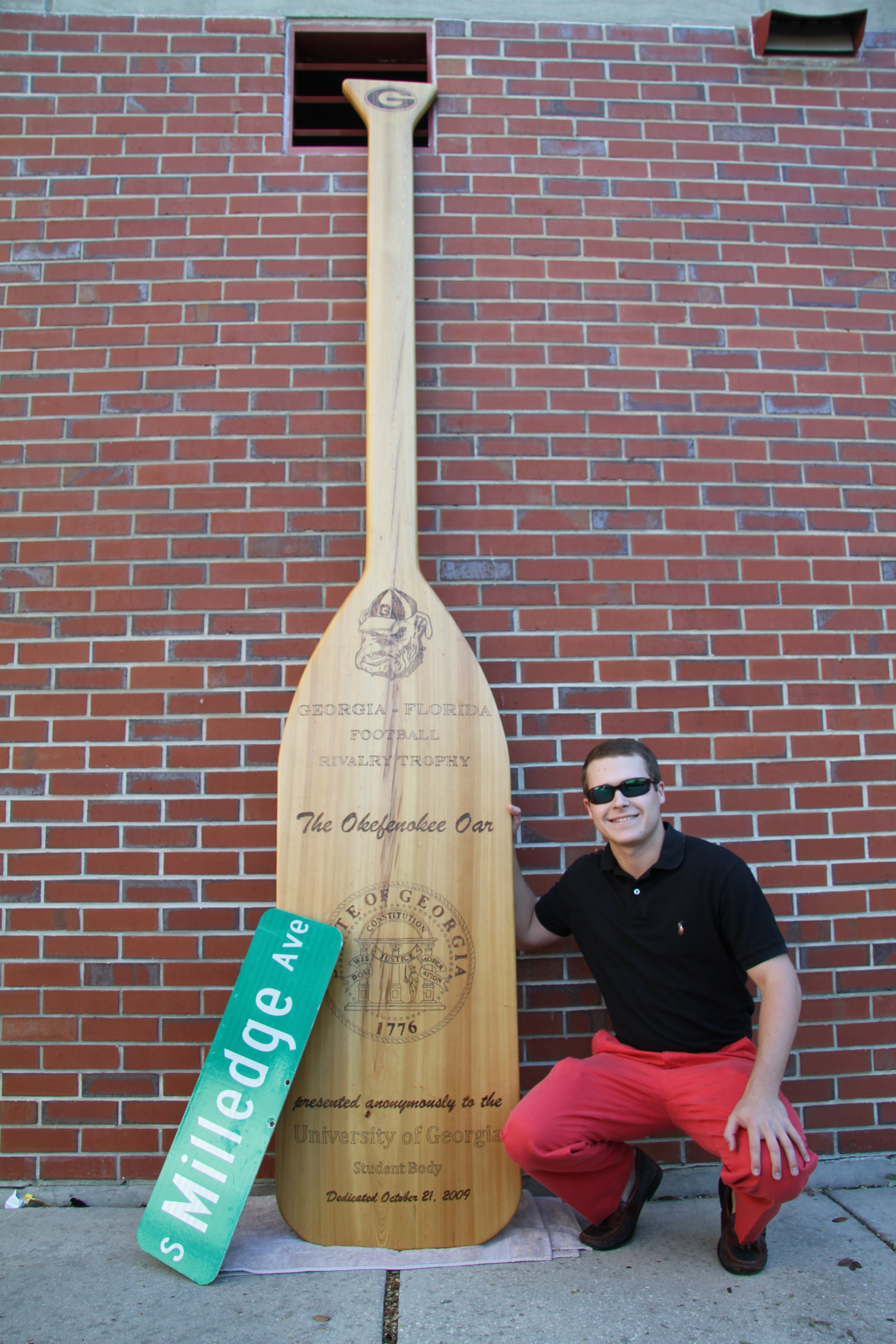
The "Georgia side" of the Okefenokee Oar

Unlike many college sports rivalries, the Georgia–Florida game historically has not been played for a trophy. The city of Jacksonville announced that it would award the winning teams the goalposts from the game in 1986, in order to persuade fans not to storm the field and destroy them as they had the previous two years. However, no goalposts were ever given out because neither university wanted them.

In 2009, the student governments of the two universities announced the creation of a new trophy, the "Okefenokee Oar". The 10-foot-long Oar was donated anonymously to the University of Florida in 2009, and has opposing sides carved with symbols and logos from each school. The Oar was carved from the remains of a 1,000-year-old cypress tree that once grew in the Okefenokee Swamp, which straddles the Florida–Georgia border and was the source of an interstate boundary dispute. Beginning with the 2009 contest, the Okefenokee Oar is presented to the winning university's student body president. No trophy is presented at the game, however.

== Notable games ==
=== 1928: Gators first victory ===
When Charlie Bachman became the 1928 Gators' new head coach, he inherited a team loaded with talent recruited by his predecessor, Harold Sebring. However, he also inherited a program which had never come close to beating the Georgia Bulldogs, their Southern Intercollegiate Athletic Association rival. Georgia was 6–0 against Florida with five shutouts and an overall scoring advantage of 190–9, including a 56–0 defeat by the 1920 "ten second backfield" and a 28–0 defeat by last year's "Dream and Wonder team".

The teams met again in Savannah, Georgia on November 10, and Bachman's Gators finally beat the Bulldogs through the efforts of Florida's first All-American Dale Van Sickle, and its "Phantom Four" backfield of Carl Brumbaugh, Rainey Cawthon, Clyde Crabtree and Royce Goodbread. With Florida holding a commanding lead in fourth quarter, jubilant Gator fans prematurely rushed the field to tear down the goal posts, resulting in fist fights breaking out between supporters of the two schools. Order was restored, the game was completed, and Florida earned its first victory in the series by the score of 26–6.

=== 1941: Sinkwich stars despite broken jaw ===
Georgia's All-American back Frank Sinkwich had broken his jaw in a game earlier in the season, but that did not keep him off the field. Wearing a custom-made chinstrap attached to his helmet, Sinkwich ran 31 times for 142 yards and two touchdowns and kicked Georgia's first field goal since 1924 in the Bulldogs' 19–3 victory over the Gators. When speaking about the loss after the game, Florida coach Tom Lieb simply said "Too much Sinkwich."

=== 1942: Georgia's largest victory ===
Having lost most upper-class players and several members of the coaching staff to service in World War II, the 1942 Florida Gators brought an inexperienced 3–4 squad into Jacksonville for the 1942 contest with Georgia. The Bulldogs, on the other hand, still had the services of many key contributors thanks to draft deferments issued to players enrolled in the University of Georgia's ROTC program, and brought a 7–0 record and No. 1 ranking to Jacksonville.

Georgia halfback Charley Trippi and Heisman Trophy-winning back Frank Sinkwich combined to score seven touchdowns as Georgia defeated Florida 75–0, the largest margin in series history. The Bulldogs finished the regular season 10–1, won the Southeastern Conference championship, defeated the UCLA Bruins 9–0 in the Rose Bowl, and were named national champions by multiple polls and ratings services. Meanwhile, the depleted Gators would not win another game on the season, and when even more students and staff joined the war effort, the school did not field a football team at all in 1943.

=== 1949: "Golden Era" victory over Georgia ===
The post–World War II 1940s were unsuccessful years for the Florida Gators. Coached by Raymond Wolf, the Gators' collection of recent high school graduates and returning war veterans played four consecutive losing seasons, a record low point in the history of the Gators football program, ironically remembered by the close-knit players as the "Golden Era." But there were still star athletes and historical moments; Wolf's 1949 Florida Gators were led by senior lineman Jimmy Kynes and running back Chuck Hunsinger. Despite being considered by media to be underdogs against Wally Butts' Georgia Bulldogs in Jacksonville, two-way linemen Kynes led what was considered their best performance of the season, stopping the Bulldogs' running game on defense, and blocking for Hunsinger on offense. Hunsinger rushed eighteen times for 174 yards and three touchdowns, and the Gators won 28–7, breaking a seven-game Georgia winning streak. Wolf would be dismissed as Florida's head coach at the end of the season, but on that day in Jacksonville, he was carried off the field by his players in celebration of their unexpected win.

=== 1952: Florida wins easy ===
Georgia clearly dominated the first several decades of their series against Florida. Coming into the 1952 contest, the Bulldogs were 23–5–1 all-time against the Gators and had won nine of the previous ten meetings, including two straight victories over Florida coach Bob Woodruff.

The Gators arrived in Jacksonville with a 3–2 record and an offense that had struggled against good defenses. In an attempt to jump-start their run-oriented attack, Woodruff and Florida offensive coordinator Frank Broyles decided to swap the positions of quarterback Rick Casares and running back Doug Dickey. Casares had been heavily recruited by Georgia but thought that Bulldog Coach Wally Butts was "too rough" with his players during a recruiting visit, so he opted to attend Florida instead.

Led by All-American lineman Charlie LaPradd on defense and Casares on offense and special teams (he was also the team's place-kicker), the Gators dominated the Bulldogs 30–0 in Jacksonville, which would remain the Gators' largest victory over the Bulldogs for almost forty years and was the first shutout over the Bulldogs since 1937. Casares ran for 108 yards and two touchdowns and kicked three extra points and a field goal, while halfback Buford Long ran for 116 yards on 10 carries.

Florida finished the season 8–3 and were invited to their first major bowl game, the 1953 Gator Bowl. Georgia finished 7–4 and went on to suffer through several sub-par seasons in the 1950s, helping Florida earn a winning decade over their border rivals for first time in the series.

=== 1964: Botched field goal beats Florida ===
While Georgia still held an overall advantage in the series, Florida enjoyed a 10–2 streak from 1952 to 1963 under head coaches Bob Woodruff and Ray Graves. That changed with the arrival of Vince Dooley as the new head coach of the underdog 1964 Georgia Bulldogs. In a game where the Bulldogs' quarterback failed to complete a single pass and was intercepted twice, Dooleys' 'Dogs relied on their running game, a staunch second-half defense, and a little bit of luck to beat Graves' tenth-ranked Florida Gators. With the game tied at 7–7 in the fourth quarter, Bulldogs placekicker Bob Etter lined up for a potential game-winning field goal. Instead, in a wild broken play, the Bulldogs' center and placeholder mishandled the snap, but Etter picked up the bobbled ball and ran it for a touchdown to score the winning points in the 14–7 contest.

Dooley's teams would split their first seven games 3–3–1 against Graves' Gators. Thereafter, Dooley's 'Dogs would go on to dominate the rivalry, winning fourteen of the nineteen games from 1971 to 1989.

=== 1966: Georgia beats Spurrier ===
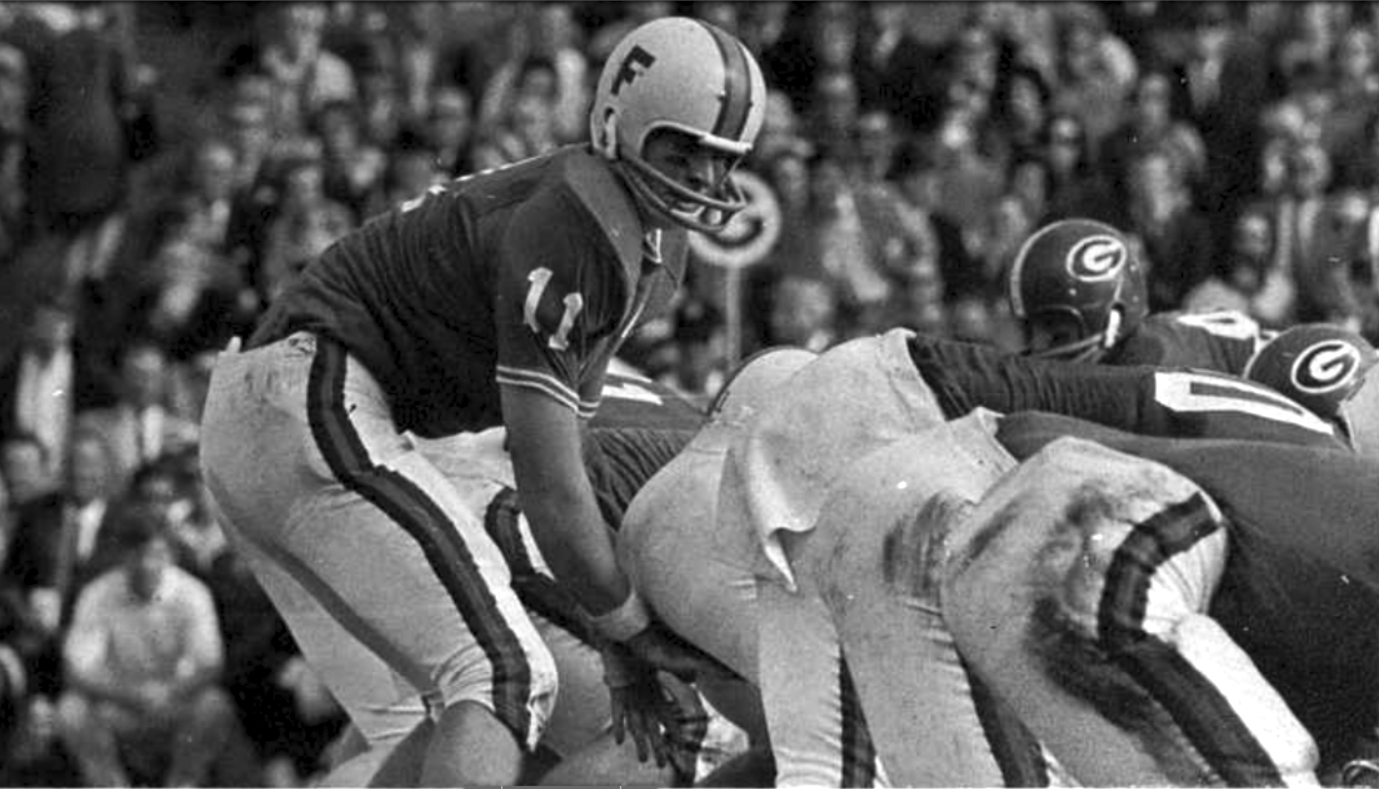
Spurrier under center

The seventh-ranked 1966 Florida Gators entered the game with a 7–0 record and the opportunity to clinch a share of their first-ever SEC title. The Gators' senior quarterback, Steve Spurrier, had just locked up the Heisman trophy the previous week with a stellar performance versus the Auburn Tigers. The Florida–Georgia game turned out very differently, however, as the Bulldogs defense dominated the game, and Spurrier threw three interceptions in the 27–10 Georgia victory. All-American defensive tackle Bill Stanfill would later reference Spurrier in recounting his experiences growing up on a farm in southwest Georgia before the advent of weightlifting: "Holding pigs for my dad to castrate was quite a challenge. I can't say that helped prepare me for football, but it sure did remind me an awful lot of sacking Steve Spurrier."

Spurrier returned to Gainesville as the Gators' head coach in 1990 and, with the sting of the 1966 loss in mind, emphasized the annual Florida–Georgia contest as the "biggest of the year." Under his tenure, the Gators were 11–1 against their bitter rivals.

=== 1970: Youngblood's forced fumble leads to Florida win ===
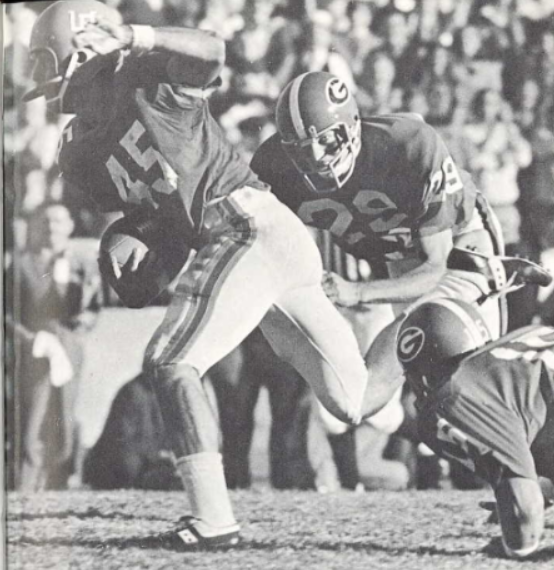
Carlos Alvarez

The 1970 Florida Gators featured All-American defensive end Jack Youngblood, and he pulled off one of the most remarkable plays in Florida football history. With Bulldogs leading 17–10 and in possession of the ball at the Gators' two-yard line, Youngblood stood up Georgia back Ricky Lake short of the goal, forced a fumble and fell on the football. "They ran a lead play to my side, and I cut it off", Youngblood said. "I'm standing there holding the ballcarrier and I take the ball away from him, and gave it back to our offense." Gators quarterback John Reaves and wide receiver Carlos Alvarez then connected for two touchdown passes in the final 5:13 to rally the Florida Gators to a 24–17 victory.

=== 1975: Trick play beats Florida ===
The 1975 Florida Gators came into the game with a 6–1 record and No. 7 ranking, while the Georgia Bulldogs were 5–2 and ranked No. 19. The Gators' offense was led by running back Tony Green, who ran an early one-yard touchdown to put the Gators ahead 7–0. The Gators led 7–3 as time was winding down in the fourth quarter. Georgia's "Junkyard Dawgs" defense allowed yards between the 20-yard-lines, but ceded little ground in the red zone. The Bulldogs set up at their own 20-yard-line with 3:10 remaining, and head coach Vince Dooley did something he rarely did: he called a trick play. Tight end Richard Appleby accepted the handoff on a reverse to the right, but instead of running downfield, he threw the ball to wide receiver Gene Washington for an improbable 80-yard touchdown play. Florida mounted a drive in the closing minutes but a bad snap foiled the Gators' game-tying field goal attempt, and Georgia held on for a 10–7 victory.

=== 1976: Fourth and dumb ===
The 1976 Florida Gators were 6–1 and ranked No. 10 coming into the game, and again seeking to secure their first SEC football championship. The Gators held a 27–13 halftime advantage and seemed to have the game in hand until the Bulldogs scored early in the third quarter to cut the lead to 27–20. Then, faced with a fourth-and-one situation at the Gators' own 29-yard-line, coach Doug Dickey decided to go for the first down rather than punt. Gators running back Earl Carr was stopped short by Bulldogs safety Johnny Henderson. Led by quarterback Ray Goff's game management and running back Kevin McLee's 198-yard rushing performance, the Bulldogs seized the momentum and scored three touchdowns on their way to a 41–27 win. After the game, Dickey admitted that "We were not outplayed; we were outcoached. I made some dumb calls." Sports writers seized on Dickey's mea culpa, and in subsequent months and years popularized the phrase "fourth and dumb" to refer to both Dickey's failed fourth down attempt and the game itself.

=== 1980: Run Lindsay Run ===
Trailing the underdog 1980 Florida Gators with their perfect season and their No. 2 ranking in jeopardy, the Bulldogs executed one of the most famous plays in college football history. Georgia trailed 21–20 with less than a minute to play and faced third and long from their own 7-yard-line. Bulldog quarterback Buck Belue dropped back to pass and was forced to scramble around in his own endzone to avoid the Gator pass rush before finding wide receiver Lindsay Scott open in the middle of the field near the Georgia 25-yard-line. Scott caught the pass facing his own endzone, turned and darted diagonally through Florida's secondary, and outran everyone down the sideline to score the game-winning touchdown with only seconds left on the game clock.

Long-time Georgia radio announcer Larry Munson's legendary call of the play gave the game its nickname:

Florida in a stand-up five, they may or may not blitz. Buck back, third down on the eight. In trouble, he got a block behind him. Gotta throw on the run. Complete to the 25. To the 30, Lindsay Scott 35, 40, Lindsay Scott 45, 50, 45, 40 . . . Run Lindsay, 25, 20, 15, 10, 5, Lindsay Scott! Lindsay Scott! Lindsay Scott!

The improbable 93-yard pass play sealed the Bulldogs' 26–21 victory, and kept Georgia's national championship hopes alive. The Bulldogs moved to No. 1 in the next round of polls and would go on to win the 1980 consensus national championship.

=== 1981 ===
Much like the previous year, the favored Georgia Bulldogs trailed the Florida Gators in the fourth quarter 21–20. Backed up on their own five yard line with eight minutes remaining in the fourth quarter, the Bulldogs methodically marched 95 yards on 17 plays, mostly on the ground. The drive culminated in three straight hand-offs to running back Herschel Walker in which he attempted to jump over the line into the endzone, finally succeeding on third down. Florida still had two minutes to score but turned over the ball on downs near midfield, and Georgia won 26–21 for the second year in a row.

=== 1984 ===
After suffering several defeats to the Bulldogs with a conference championship at stake, coach Galen Hall's 1984 Florida Gators entered the contest undefeated in the SEC. The Gators dominated early, building a 17–0 lead by early in the second half. But the Bulldogs seemed to come alive in the third quarter, mounting a long drive; however, Georgia's drive died in the shadow of the Gators' goal line when they were stuffed on fourth down, checking the Bulldogs momentarily but pinning the Gators deep in their own territory. On the third play following the change of possession, Gators quarterback Kerwin Bell dropped back into his own end zone and lofted a long pass to streaking receiver Ricky Nattiel, who went 96 yards for a touchdown. The Bulldog momentum was snuffed out and the Gators went on to a convincing 27–0 victory, inspiring jubilant Florida fans to storm the field and tear down the goalposts after the final whistle.

=== 1985 ===
The 1985 Florida Gators entered the contest on a roll: coming off an emotional win over the Auburn Tigers, undefeated, and ranked No. 1 in the nation for the first time in school history. This would not be a repeat of the 1984 game, however. As they had done so many times in the past, the Bulldogs spoiled Florida's season, defeating the Gators 24–3 with freshmen running backs Keith Henderson and Tim Worley both rushing for over 100 yards. After the game, jubilant Georgia fans stormed the field and tore down the goalposts.

=== 1993 ===
In constant rain, the usually prolific passing game of coach Steve Spurrier's 1993 Florida Gators was stymied. Instead, the Gators relied on tailback Errict Rhett to amass 183 yards and two touchdowns to build a 33–26 fourth-quarter lead. Led by quarterback Eric Zeier, the Georgia Bulldogs mounted a drive into Florida territory in the final minute and a half. Zeier completed what appeared to be the game-tying touchdown to Jerry Jerman with five seconds remaining in the game. However, Gators cornerback Anthone Lott had called a timeout just before the ball was snapped, forcing the Bulldogs to play the down again. Lott was called for pass interference on the ensuing play, giving Georgia one last untimed chance to score. Zeier's final pass fell incomplete, and the Gators won a hard-fought, but controversial 33–26 victory.

=== 1995 ===
In the mid-1990s, the old Gator Bowl Stadium was rebuilt as Jacksonville Municipal Stadium for the expansion Jacksonville Jaguars of the NFL, temporarily moving the Florida-Georgia game to on-campus sites for the first time in over six decades Florida had soundly defeated Georgia at "The Swamp" in 1994, and an undefeated 1995 Florida Gators hoped to repeat the feat at Sanford Stadium against a struggling Georgia Bulldogs team led by soon-to-be-fired coach Ray Goff.

Gators starting quarterback Danny Wuerffel threw for 242 yards and five touchdowns before leaving the game in the third quarter with Florida leading 38-17. Backup quarterback Eric Kresser threw for two more touchdowns in the fourth quarter, including one with 1:21 remaining, to make the final score 52–17. After the game, Gators coach Steve Spurrier stated that he kept running his usual offense in the second half because he'd wanted to score "half a hundred" against the Bulldogs in their own stadium, stating that "we heard no one had ever done that before." Spurrier continued to defend his playcalling in later years; in a 2023 interview, he said, "We threw a touchdown with one or two minutes left in the game with all the backups in there. So if they wanted to get mad about that, that’s OK." The Gators' 52 points remains the record for most scored against the Bulldogs on their home field.

=== 2002 ===
The 2002 Bulldogs brought a perfect 8–0 record and No. 4 ranking to the annual grudge match in Jacksonville. Under new head coach Ron Zook, the Gators limped into the game with a 5–3 record and were unranked for the first time in over a decade. In a reversal of many Florida-Georgia games over the years, it was the underdog Gators who would ruin the Bulldogs' season.

Trailing 7–6, the Gators took the lead with a key play on defense. Upon entering the contest in the second quarter, Bulldogs quarterback DJ Shockley was intercepted by Gators safety Guss Scott, who returned it for a touchdown, giving his team a 12–7 lead after a failed two-point conversion attempt. The Bulldogs moved the ball but could not punch it into the endzone, settling for two field goals to take a halftime 13–12 lead. The defenses continued to dominate in the second half, until an early fourth-quarter Gator drive ended with a touchdown pass from quarterback Rex Grossman and gave Florida a 20–13 advantage. The Georgia offense failed to score again and failed to convert a third-down in thirteen attempts as Florida held on for the upset. This turned out to be Georgia's only loss of the season. They went 13–1 and won the SEC Championship and Sugar Bowl.

=== 2007 – 2008 ===
==== 2007 ====
The 2007 game is remembered for the "Gator Stomp", a first-quarter mass celebration of the entire Georgia team in the Gators' endzone after Georgia running back Knowshon Moreno scored the game's first touchdown early in the contest. Georgia coach Mark Richt later acknowledged that he had encouraged his players to draw an excessive celebration penalty after their first touchdown, but intended that only the eleven players on the field celebrate, not the entire team. Georgia received two unsportsmanlike conduct penalties for the celebration, moving the ensuing kickoff to their own 8-yard line, and Florida scored a touchdown on their next possession to tie the game at seven. Still, the early celebration seemed to fire up the underdog Bulldogs. Moreno ran for 188 yards and Georgia's defense sacked Gators quarterback Tim Tebow six times, holding him to the lowest rushing total (−15 net yards) of his Heisman Trophy-winning season in the Bulldogs' 42–30 victory. The high-scoring game was the first in series history in which both teams scored thirty or more points.

==== 2008 ====
The 2008 Georgia–Florida game, which Georgia lost 49–10.

As the 2008 game approached, both coaches repeatedly stated that the previous year's incident would have no bearing on the contest. Florida coach Urban Meyer went so far as to issue a gag order to his players, instructing them not to talk about the 2007 game with the media. However, in his authorized biography published soon after the 2007 season, Meyer wrote: "That wasn't right. It was a bad deal. . . . We'll handle it, and it's going to be a big deal." The Bulldogs and Gators were both ranked in the top 10, and the winner would have the inside track in the SEC Eastern Division race and a possible shot at a national title. Some commentators went so far as to call it the biggest match-up in the series history, or at least the previous 20 years.

Both offenses moved the ball with some effectiveness in the first half, but while the Gators scored two touchdowns, the Bulldogs were held to three field goal attempts and missed two of them. Georgia coach Mark Richt also called an unsuccessful onside kick after his team's made field goal, further blunting their momentum, and Florida held a 14–3 halftime lead. The Bulldogs turned the ball over four times in the second half and the Gators took advantage, pulling away for a 49–10 win in what was the Bulldogs' second worst loss in series history. In an apparent response to the Bulldogs' endzone celebration of the previous year, Meyer used both of his remaining timeouts with less than a minute to play, giving his team and fans more time to celebrate the sure victory. After the game, he broke his pre-game silence on the 2007 celebration. "Was it motivation for our players? Yeah, it was."

Florida went on to win the SEC Championship Game and the BCS National Championship that season.

=== 2012 ===
The rivals came into their 2012 matchup with only one loss between them – Florida had a 7–0 record and a No. 2 ranking in the AP poll while Georgia was 6–1 and ranked No. 12 – once again making the game in Jacksonville a pivotal one for the teams' conference and national championship prospects, as South Carolina, the only other SEC East contender, already had 2 conference losses to LSU and Florida and was thus eliminated from SEC East contention. Both teams featured strong defenses and ball control offenses, so it was not a surprise that the contest was a low scoring one. Georgia running back Todd Gurley scored to cap the Bulldog's first possession and give his team an early 7–0 lead, but that would be the only touchdown for much of the game. With the defenses dominating and the offenses committing nine total turnovers between them, the rivals could only muster field goals for the next 40 minutes of game time, and Florida kicker Caleb Sturgis booted his third of the contest to cut Georgia's lead to 10–9 early in the 4th quarter.

Georgia's offense finally broke through with a 45-yard touchdown pass from Aaron Murray to Malcolm Mitchell, putting them up 17–9 midway through the final period. Florida's offense also found a rhythm with the game on the line, and quarterback Jeff Driskel led the Gators on a potential tying drive deep into Georgia territory. With just over two minutes remaining, he threw a strike over the middle to tight end Jordan Reed, who appeared to be headed for a touchdown before Bulldog outside line-backer Jarvis Jones punched the ball out of his hands. Georgia recovered in the back of the endzone for a touchback, and Florida's sixth turnover of the game allowed Georgia to hold on for the win. The teams finished the regular season tied for first in the SEC East with identical 7–1 records in conference play, but by virtue of their head-to-head victory over the Gators, the Bulldogs advanced to the SEC Championship game, where they lost to eventual BCS national champion Alabama.

== Game results ==
Florida victories	Georgia victories	Tie games

Date	Location	Winning team		Losing team	
October 15, 1904	Macon, GA	Georgia	52	Florida^{A}	0
November 6, 1915	Jacksonville, FL	Georgia	37	Florida	0
October 14, 1916	Athens, GA	Georgia	21	Florida	0
October 25, 1919	Tampa, FL	Georgia	16	Florida	0
November 13, 1920	Athens, GA	Georgia	56	Florida	0
October 30, 1926	Athens, GA	Georgia	32	Florida	9
November 5, 1927	Jacksonville, FL	Georgia	28	Florida	0
November 10, 1928	Savannah, GA	Florida	26	Georgia	6
October 26, 1929	Jacksonville, FL	Florida	18	Georgia	6
November 1, 1930	Savannah, GA	Tie	0	Tie	0
October 31, 1931	Gainesville, FL	Georgia	33	Florida	6
October 29, 1932	Athens, GA	Georgia	33	Florida	12
November 4, 1933	Jacksonville, FL	Georgia	14	Florida	0
November 3, 1934	Jacksonville, FL	Georgia	14	Florida	0
November 2, 1935	Jacksonville, FL	Georgia	7	Florida	0
November 7, 1936	Jacksonville, FL	Georgia	26	Florida	8
November 6, 1937	Jacksonville, FL	Florida	6	Georgia	0
November 5, 1938	Jacksonville, FL	Georgia	19	Florida	6
November 11, 1939	Jacksonville, FL	Georgia	6	Florida	2
November 9, 1940	Jacksonville, FL	Florida	18	Georgia	13
November 8, 1941	Jacksonville, FL	Georgia	19	Florida	3
November 7, 1942	Jacksonville, FL	#1 Georgia	75	Florida	0
November 11, 1944	Jacksonville, FL	Georgia	38	Florida	12
November 10, 1945	Jacksonville, FL	Georgia	34	Florida	0
November 9, 1946	Jacksonville, FL	#3 Georgia	33	Florida	14
November 8, 1947	Jacksonville, FL	Georgia	34	Florida	6
November 6, 1948	Jacksonville, FL	#13 Georgia	20	Florida	12
November 5, 1949	Jacksonville, FL	Florida	28	Georgia	7
November 11, 1950	Jacksonville, FL	Georgia	6	Florida	0
November 10, 1951	Jacksonville, FL	Georgia	7	Florida	6
October 25, 1952	Jacksonville, FL	Florida	30	Georgia	0
November 7, 1953	Jacksonville, FL	Florida	21	Georgia	7
November 6, 1954	Jacksonville, FL	Georgia	14	Florida	13
November 5, 1955	Jacksonville, FL	Florida	19	Georgia	13
November 10, 1956	Jacksonville, FL	#13 Florida	28	Georgia	0
November 9, 1957	Jacksonville, FL	Florida	22	Georgia	0
November 8, 1958	Jacksonville, FL	#19 Florida	7	Georgia	6
November 7, 1959	Jacksonville, FL	#11 Georgia	21	Florida	10
November 5, 1960	Jacksonville, FL	Florida	22	Georgia	14
November 11, 1961	Jacksonville, FL	Florida	21	Georgia	14
November 10, 1962	Jacksonville, FL	Florida	23	Georgia	15
November 9, 1963	Jacksonville, FL	Florida	21	Georgia	14
November 7, 1964	Jacksonville, FL	Georgia	14	#9 Florida	7
November 6, 1965	Jacksonville, FL	Florida	14	Georgia	10
November 5, 1966	Jacksonville, FL	Georgia	27	#7 Florida	10
November 11, 1967	Jacksonville, FL	Florida	17	Georgia	16
November 9, 1968	Jacksonville, FL	#9 Georgia	51	Florida	0
November 8, 1969	Jacksonville, FL	Tie	13	Tie	13
November 7, 1970	Jacksonville, FL	Florida	24	Georgia	17
November 6, 1971	Jacksonville, FL	#7 Georgia	49	Florida	7
November 11, 1972	Jacksonville, FL	Georgia	10	Florida	7
November 10, 1973	Jacksonville, FL	Florida	11	Georgia	10
November 9, 1974	Jacksonville, FL	Georgia	17	#6 Florida	16

Date	Location	Winning team		Losing team	
November 8, 1975	Jacksonville, FL	Georgia	10	#11 Florida	7
November 6, 1976	Jacksonville, FL	#7 Georgia	41	#10 Florida	27
November 5, 1977	Jacksonville, FL	Florida	22	Georgia	17
November 11, 1978	Jacksonville, FL	#11 Georgia	24	Florida	22
November 10, 1979	Jacksonville, FL	Georgia	33	Florida	10
November 8, 1980	Jacksonville, FL	#2 Georgia	26	#20 Florida	21
November 7, 1981	Jacksonville, FL	#4 Georgia	26	Florida	21
November 6, 1982	Jacksonville, FL	#3 Georgia	44	#20 Florida	0
November 5, 1983	Jacksonville, FL	#4 Georgia	10	#9 Florida	9
November 10, 1984	Jacksonville, FL	#10 Florida	27	#8 Georgia	0
November 9, 1985	Jacksonville, FL	#17 Georgia	24	#1 Florida	3
November 8, 1986	Jacksonville, FL	Florida	31	#19 Georgia	19
November 7, 1987	Jacksonville, FL	#10 Georgia	23	#17 Florida	10
November 5, 1988	Jacksonville, FL	#19 Georgia	26	Florida	3
November 11, 1989	Jacksonville, FL	Georgia	17	#20 Florida	10
November 10, 1990	Jacksonville, FL	#10 Florida	38	Georgia	7
November 9, 1991	Jacksonville, FL	#6 Florida	45	#23 Georgia	13
October 31, 1992	Jacksonville, FL	#20 Florida	26	#7 Georgia	24
October 30, 1993	Jacksonville, FL	#10 Florida	33	Georgia	26
October 29, 1994	Gainesville, FL	#5 Florida	52	Georgia	14
October 28, 1995	Athens, GA	#3 Florida	52	Georgia	17
November 2, 1996	Jacksonville, FL	#1 Florida	47	Georgia	7
November 1, 1997	Jacksonville, FL	#14 Georgia	37	#6 Florida	17
October 31, 1998	Jacksonville, FL	#6 Florida	38	#11 Georgia	7
October 30, 1999	Jacksonville, FL	#5 Florida	30	#10 Georgia	14
October 28, 2000	Jacksonville, FL	#8 Florida	34	#13 Georgia	23
October 27, 2001	Jacksonville, FL	#6 Florida	24	#15 Georgia	10
November 2, 2002	Jacksonville, FL	Florida	20	#5 Georgia	13
November 1, 2003	Jacksonville, FL	#23 Florida	16	#4 Georgia	13
October 30, 2004	Jacksonville, FL	#10 Georgia	31	Florida	24
October 29, 2005	Jacksonville, FL	#16 Florida	14	#4 Georgia	10
October 28, 2006	Jacksonville, FL	#9 Florida	21	Georgia	14
October 27, 2007	Jacksonville, FL	#20 Georgia	42	#9 Florida	30
November 1, 2008	Jacksonville, FL	#5 Florida	49	#8 Georgia	10
October 31, 2009	Jacksonville, FL	#1 Florida	41	Georgia	17
October 30, 2010	Jacksonville, FL	Florida	34	Georgia	31^{OT}
October 29, 2011	Jacksonville, FL	#22 Georgia	24	Florida	20
October 27, 2012	Jacksonville, FL	#12 Georgia	17	#3 Florida	9
November 2, 2013	Jacksonville, FL	Georgia	23	Florida	20
November 1, 2014	Jacksonville, FL	Florida	38	#9 Georgia	20
October 31, 2015	Jacksonville, FL	#11 Florida	27	Georgia	3
October 29, 2016	Jacksonville, FL	#14 Florida	24	Georgia	10
October 28, 2017	Jacksonville, FL	#3 Georgia	42	Florida	7
October 27, 2018	Jacksonville, FL	#7 Georgia	36	#9 Florida	17
November 2, 2019	Jacksonville, FL	#8 Georgia	24	#6 Florida	17
November 7, 2020	Jacksonville, FL	#8 Florida	44	#5 Georgia	28
October 30, 2021	Jacksonville, FL	#1 Georgia	34	Florida	7
October 29, 2022	Jacksonville, FL	#1 Georgia	42	Florida	20
October 28, 2023	Jacksonville, FL	#1 Georgia	43	Florida	20
November 2, 2024	Jacksonville, FL	#2 Georgia	34	Florida	20
November 1, 2025	Jacksonville, FL	#5 Georgia	24	Florida	20
October 31, 2026	Atlanta, GA	#3 Georgia	27	#17 Florida	8
Series: Georgia leads 59–44–2

=== Results by Location ===
As of October 31, 2026

State	City	Games	Florida victories	Georgia victories	Ties	Years played
Florida	Jacksonville	93	41	51	1	1915–present
Florida	Gainesville	2	1	1	0	1931, 1994
Florida	Tampa	1	0	1	0	1919
Georgia	Athens	5	1	4	0	1916, 1920, 1926, 1932, 1995
Georgia	Savannah	2	1	0	1	1928, 1930
Georgia	Atlanta	1	0	1	0	2026
Georgia	Macon	1 or 0^{A}	0	1 or 0^{A}	0	1904

=== Results by Venue ===
As of October 31, 2026

State	City		Games	Florida victories	Georgia victories	Ties	Years played
Florida	Jacksonville	EverBank Stadium	30	16	14	0	1996–present
Florida	Jacksonville	Gator Bowl Stadium	62	25	36	1	1927, 1929, 1933–1993
Florida	Jacksonville	Barrs Field	1	0	1	0	1915
Florida	Gainesville	Ben Hill Griffin Stadium	2	1	1	0	1931, 1994
Florida	Tampa	Plant Field	1	0	1	0	1919
Georgia	Athens	Sanford Stadium	2	1	1	0	1932, 1995
Georgia	Athens	Sanford Field	3	0	3	0	1916, 1920, 1926
Georgia	Savannah	Municipal Stadium	2	1	0	1	1928, 1930
Georgia	Atlanta	Mercedes-Benz Stadium	1	0	1	0	2026
Georgia	Macon	Central City Park	1 or 0^{A}	0	1 or 0	0	1904

^{A} The University of Georgia includes a 1904 game against the University of Florida at Lake City in the series win–loss record while the modern University of Florida does not. See the Series history section above for further explanation.

== Georgia-Florida Hall of Fame ==
The Jacksonville Economic Development Commission created the Georgia-Florida Hall of Fame in 1995 to recognize the players, coaches, and other representatives from each school who have made their mark on the rivalry. Each year, four new members (two from each school) are announced in June, and are formally inducted at a luncheon in Jacksonville the Friday before the football game. Georgia-Florida Hall of Fame inductees through 2025 include:

Florida: Carlos Alvarez, Reidel Anthony, Kerwin Bell, Howell Boney, Scot Brantley, Joe Brodsky, Alex Brown, Trey Burton, Andre Caldwell, Norm Carlson, Kevin Carter, Rick Casares, Jeff Chandler, Wes Chandler, Brad Culpepper, Doug Dickey, Chris Doering, Jimmy Dunn, Larry Dupree, Ciatrick Fason, Jeremy Foley, Don Gaffney, Jabar Gaffney, Ray Graves, Earnest Graham, Rex Grossman, Joe Haden, Galen Hall, Percy Harvin, Ike Hilliard, Chuck Hunsinger, Lindy Infante, Willie Jackson, Jr., Brandon James, Doug Johnson, Todd Johnson, Jevon Kearse, Charlie LaPradd, Chris Leak, Buford Long, Wilber Marshall, Shane Matthews, Lee McGriff, Nat Moore, Ricky Nattiel, Mike Peterson, Keiwan Ratliff, John Reaves, Errict Rhett, Lito Sheppard, Brandon Spikes, Steve Spurrier, Fred Taylor, Tim Tebow, Richard Trapp, Ben Troupe, Fred Weary, John L. Williams, Lawrence Wright, Danny Wuerffel, Jack Youngblood.

Georgia: Peter Anderson, Richard Appleby, Buck Belue, Boss Bailey, Champ Bailey, John Brantley, Zeke Bratkowski, Charley Britt, Kevin Butler, Wally Butts, Mike Cavan, Knox Culpepper, Rennie Curran, Thomas Davis Sr., Vince Dooley, Robert Edwards, Terrence Edwards, Bob Etter, Freddie Gilbert, Randall Godfrey, Ray Goff, Bill Goldberg, Cy Grant, David Greene, Mike Fisher, Rodney Hampton, Garrison Hearst, Terry Hoage, Jarvis Jones, John Little, Dan Magill, Kevin McLee, Willie McClendon, Sony Michel, Knowshon Moreno, Larry Munson, Aaron Murray, George Patton, David Pollack, John Rauch, Mark Richt, Rex Robinson, Matt Robinson, Erk Russell, Bill Saye, Jake Scott, Lindsay Scott, Richard Seymour, Frank Sinkwich, Bill Stanfill, Jon Stinchcomb, Matt Stinchcomb, Marcus Stroud, Tommy Thurson, Charley Trippi, Herschel Walker, Gene Washington, Charles Wittemore, Scott Woerner, Tim Worley, Eric Zeier.

In 2017, two members were inducted who were not linked with one particular school: Greg McGarity, who was a long-serving athletic administrator at Florida before becoming Georgia's athletic director, and Verne Lundquist, a retired broadcaster who was the television play-by-play announcer for many Georgia-Florida games as part of SEC on CBS coverage.

== See also ==
- List of NCAA college football rivalry games
- List of most-played college football series in NCAA Division I

== Bibliography ==
- 2009 Southern Conference Football Media Guide, Year-by-Year Standings, Southern Conference, Spartanburg, South Carolina, pp. 74–77 (2009).
- 2010 Southeastern Conference Football Media Guide, Southeastern Conference, Birmingham, Alabama, p. 60 (2010).
- 2011 Florida Gators Football Media Guide, University Athletic Association, Gainesville, Florida, pp. 116–125 (2011).
- 2011 Georgia Football Media Guide, University of Georgia Athletic Department, Athens, Georgia, pp. 157–168 (2011).
- Burns, Robbie, Belue to Scott!: The greatest moment in Georgia football history, H&H Publishing Company, Macon, Georgia (2010). ISBN 978-0-615-39400-8.
- Carlson, Norm, University of Florida Football Vault: The History of the Florida Gators, Whitman Publishing, LLC, Atlanta, Georgia (2007). ISBN 0-7948-2298-3.
- Golenbock, Peter, Go Gators! An Oral History of Florida's Pursuit of Gridiron Glory, Legends Publishing, LLC, St. Petersburg, Florida (2002). ISBN 0-9650782-1-3.
- Hairston, Jack, Tales from the Gator Swamp: A Collection of the Greatest Gator Stories Ever Told, Sports Publishing, LLC, Champaign, Illinois (2002). ISBN 1-58261-514-4.
- McCarthy, Kevin M., Fightin' Gators: A History of University of Florida Football, Arcadia Publishing, Mount Pleasant, South Carolina (2000). ISBN 978-0-7385-0559-6.
- McEwen, Tom, The Gators: A Story of Florida Football, The Strode Publishers, Huntsville, Alabama (1974). ISBN 0-87397-025-X.
- Nash, Noel, ed., The Gainesville Sun Presents The Greatest Moments in Florida Gators Football, Sports Publishing, Inc., Champaign, Illinois (1998). ISBN 1-57167-196-X.
- Rappoport, Ken, & Barry Wilner, Football Feuds: The Greatest College Football Rivalries, The Globe Pequot Press, Guilford, Connecticut (2007). ISBN 1-59921-014-2
- Saylor, Roger, "Southern Intercollegiate Athletic Association", College Football Historical Society, The LA84 Foundation (1993).
- Smith, Loran, University of Georgia Football Vault: The Story of the Georgia Bulldogs, 1892–2007, Whitman Publishing, LLC, Atlanta, Georgia (2007). ISBN 978-0-7948-2296-5.
