= Tim Groves =

American football player (born 1959)

No. 20
- Positions: Quarterback, defensive back

Personal information
- Born: February 18, 1959 (age 67); Sumter, South Carolina, U.S.
- Listed height: 6 ft 1 in (1.85 m)
- Listed weight: 210 lb (95 kg)

Career information
- High school: Oak Ridge (FL)
- College: Florida

Career history
- Tampa Bay Bandits (1983); Memphis Showboats (1984)

Awards and highlights
- Second-team All-SEC (1980)

Timothy Cecil Groves (born February 18, 1959) is an American former football defensive back and quarterback who played two seasons in the USFL. He went to college at Florida.

== Early life and education ==
Tim Groves was born on February 18, 1959, in Sumter, South Carolina. He went to Oak Ridge High School in Orlando, Florida. Groves went to college at Florida. He played cornerback and quarterback. In 1980, Groves was in a famous play known as "Run, Lindsay!", Groves was a cornerback trying to chase down Lindsay Scott to stop him from scoring a 93-yard game-winning touchdown.

== Professional career ==
Groves started his professional career in 1983, with the Tampa Bay Bandits of the USFL. He played in 11 games with them. The next season he played with the Memphis Showboats.

== Later life ==
After his USFL career, Groves opened a sports bar called "The Thirsty Gator". The Thirsty Gator has remained open for 39 years.
