= Uga (mascot) =

Mascot for the University of Georgia, USA

- Uga I
- University: University of Georgia
- Conference: SEC
- Description: English bulldog
- Origin of name: the University of Ga. (Note: The traditional abbreviation for Georgia is Ga. The modern, capitalized abbreviation of GA was first put into wide use by the USPS in 1963.)
- First seen: 1956
- Hall of Fame: 2022

Uga (/ˈʌɡə/ uh-GUH) is the official live mascot of the University of Georgia Bulldogs. Since Uga I's introduction in 1956, every Uga has been owned by the Sonny Seiler family of Savannah, Georgia. The mascot's name is a play on the common abbreviation for the University of Georgia, UGA.

== Background ==
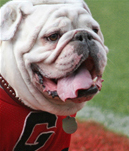
Uga VI, the official live mascot of the Georgia Bulldogs from 1999–2008

The Uga mascots started in 1956, when Seiler brought a bulldog that was given to him as a wedding present, by Frank Heard, at Georgia Bulldogs' first home game of the season. Afterwards, head coach Wally Butts asked his permission to use the dog as Georgia's mascot, and around the same time a University of Georgia Law School fellow student and friend Billy Young suggested that he name it Uga, a play on the common "UGA" abbreviation of the University of Georgia. Since then, every official Uga has been owned by and lived with the Seiler family in Savannah, Georgia. They also transport him to and from the events he attends as mascot.

Traditionally, the incumbent Uga is present at every Georgia Bulldogs home football game, many away games, and other university-related functions and sports events, and usually wears a spiked collar and red jersey with varsity letter. The red jersey is Uga's typical "uniform," though he wears a green jersey on St. Patrick's Day. Other special appearances include 1982, when Uga IV attended the Heisman Trophy ceremony in New York City wearing a tuxedo, and 2007, when Uga VI wore a black jersey for the "blackout" game against Auburn University. Uga's jersey is made from the same fabric as the players' official game jerseys, and he even has an official student identification card. He has a custom-built air-conditioned dog house at Sanford Stadium and typically sits on or near bags of ice at games, as bulldogs are susceptible to heat stroke (a problem in the humid southeastern United States).

To date, eleven dogs have carried the name "Uga". Each has been descended from the original Uga, and has frequently been the son of the predecessor.

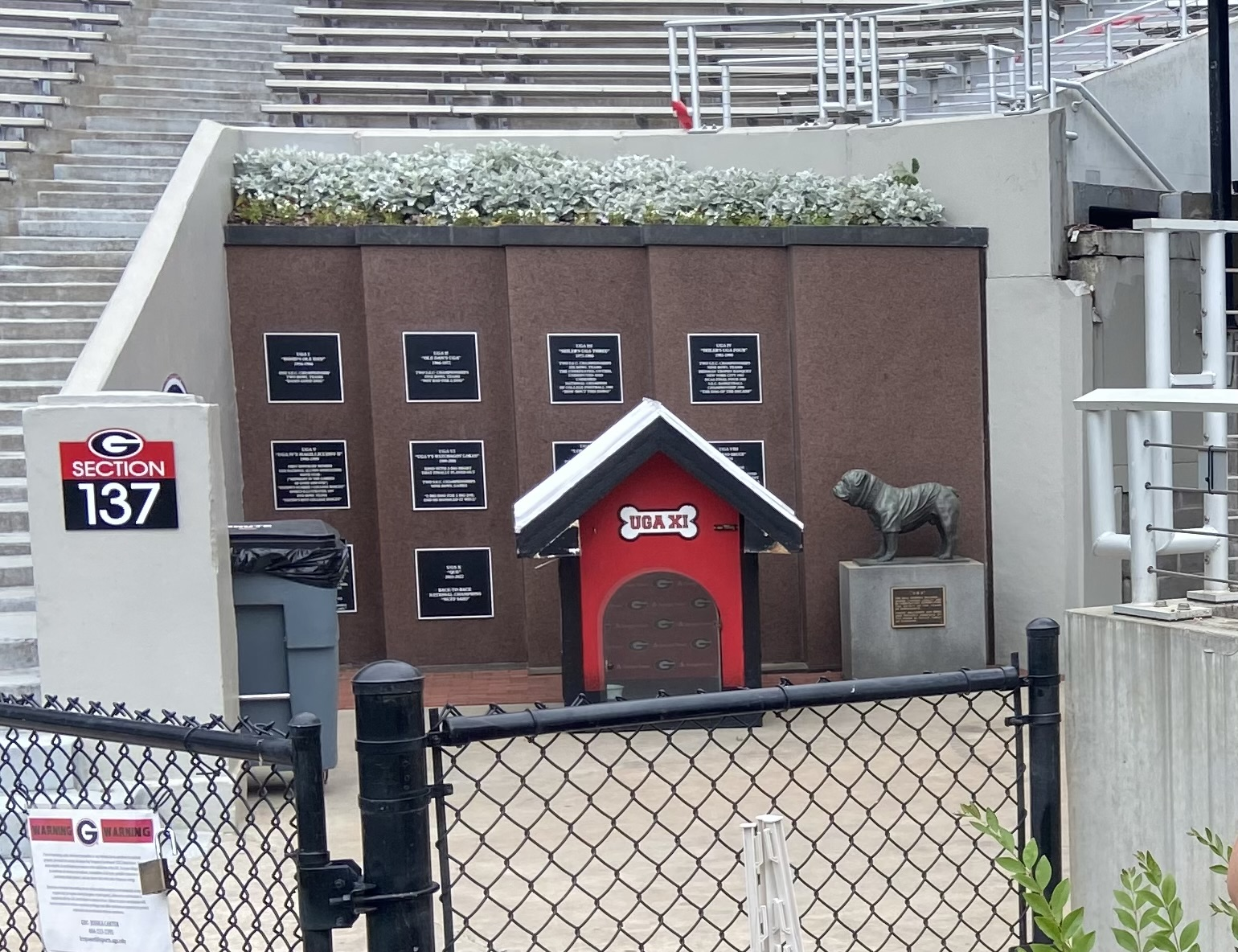
UGA mausoleum at the southwest corner of Sanford Stadium.

Deceased Ugas are interred in a mausoleum near the main entrance at the southwest corner of Sanford Stadium. A bronze plaque describing each dog's tenure and including an epitaph is engraved in front of each tomb. The tomb's original location was at the east end of Sanford Stadium, and Ugas I and II were originally buried there. Prior to its 1981 enclosure, the university moved the Uga graves to the west end. When the west end zone was enclosed in 1992, the Ugas were entombed in their current resting place, and a bronze, life-sized statue representing Uga was placed in front of the mausoleum. On game days, fans bring flowers and gifts to leave at the tombs of the past bulldogs who served as their team's mascot.

Several Ugas have retired as part of pre-game ceremonies, during which there is a "passing of the collar" and the new Uga begins his reign. During these ceremonies, the fans typically chant "Damn good dog," a tradition dating back to the original Uga.

== Uga as part of the team ==
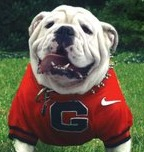
Uga VI, the official live mascot of the Georgia Bulldogs

Uga has been considered a part of the football team since the day Uga I, Sonny, was asked to be the official mascot. Uga has his own custom made jersey to wear at every game day that is made with the same materials as the football players' jerseys. His jersey also has his name stitched on the back. When Uga gets a new jersey, or another Uga is named the official mascot, the old jerseys are destroyed.

Uga officially becomes a part of the team through a ceremony on the football field before a game. The head coach will officially welcome the next Uga by placing the well-known spiked collar on the bulldog. Uga XI, the current Uga, received his collar on April 15, 2023, before the 2023 Spring Game.

In addition, Uga receives a varsity letter in the form of a plaque for his endless support for the athletes. The plaque is identical to those received by the athletes at the end of each season.

Uga travels with the team and stays in the same hotel as the players, in his own room with the Seilers. Uga X attended the Rose Bowl in 2018, becoming the first ever playoff Uga. He flew to Pasadena, California, with the team, attending all team events, supporting the football team through their playoff run in the 2017–2018 season.

== Genealogy of Uga namesakes ==
Records for each mascot
Dog	W	L	T	Pct
Uga I	53	48	6	.523
Uga II	42	16	3	.713
Uga III	71	32	2	.684
Uga IV	77	24	4	.731
Uga V	65	39	1	.624
Uga VI	87	27	0	.763
Uga VII	16	7	0	.696
Uga VIII	4	2	0	.667
Uga IX	44	19	0	.698
Uga X	91	18	0	.834
Uga XI	36	6	0	.857

- Uga I ("Hood's Ole Dan", 1956–66) – Started the Uga mascot line. Was a grandson of a bulldog that accompanied the Georgia football team to its 1943 Rose Bowl victory. Won one Southeastern Conference football title (1959) and one Orange Bowl (1960). Sanford Stadium Epitaph: Damn Good Dog
- Uga II ("Ole Dan's Uga", 1966–72) – Won two SEC football titles (1966, 1968), one Cotton Bowl (1966) and one national title (1968 Litkenhous poll). Epitaph: Not Bad for a Dog
- Uga III ("Seiler's Uga Three", 1972–81) – Won two SEC titles (1976, 1980), one Peach Bowl (1973), one Sugar Bowl (1981) and one consensus national title (1980). Epitaph: How 'Bout This Dawg
- Uga IV ("Seiler's Uga Four", 1981–90) – Won two SEC championships (1981, 1982) and one Cotton Bowl (1984). He was the first live mascot ever invited to a Heisman trophy presentation in 1982, and accompanied Herschel Walker to the Downtown Athletic Club wearing a custom-made black collar and tie. Epitaph: The Dog of the Decade
- Uga V ("Uga IV's Magillicuddy II", 1990–99) – Won one Peach Bowl (1998). He was named in honor of Dan Magill, longtime Georgia tennis coach and Sports Information Director, and in honor of Magillicuddy I, who served as interim mascot for one game after Uga IV's death. He portrayed his father, Uga IV, in the motion picture Midnight in the Garden of Good and Evil, and was pictured on the cover of Sports Illustrated in 1997. In 1996, he famously lunged at Auburn wide receiver Robert Baker after he scored a touchdown. The pictures and video of this incident have been widely circulated as a symbol of the Deep South's Oldest Rivalry. Epitaph: Defender of His Turf
- Uga VI ("Uga V's Whatchagot Loran", 1999–2008) – Won two SEC championships (2002, 2005), two Sugar Bowls (2003, 2008), one Peach Bowl (2006) and had more than 20 victories over ranked opponents, the most of any Uga to date. He was named in honor of Loran Smith, longtime Georgia football sideline reporter and past president of the Georgia Bulldog Club (During football games, when former radio announcer Larry Munson called on Smith for a sideline report, he would say "Loran, whadda ya got?"). He was the largest at 65 pounds, and held the best winning percentage at time of retirement; he also held the most wins as well. He died of congestive heart failure on June 27, 2008. Epitaph: A Big Dog For A Big Job, And He Handled It Well
- Uga VII ("Loran's Best", 2008–09) – Also named in honor of Loran Smith. His tenure ended abruptly near the end of his second season when he died of heart failure on November 19, 2009. Epitaph: Gone Too Soon
- Uga VIII ("Big Bad Bruce", 2010–11) – Named in honor of University of Georgia veterinarian Dr. Bruce Hollett. He was introduced at the October 16, 2010, homecoming game against Vanderbilt. On January 7, 2011, UGA officials announced that Uga VIII had been diagnosed with canine lymphoma, which led to his death on February 4, 2011. Epitaph: He Never Had A Chance
- Uga IX ("Russ", 2012–15; interim mascot, 2009–12) – After the death of Uga VII, his five-year-old half-brother, Russ, was selected as interim mascot for the final two games of the 2009 season. He continued as interim mascot for the first six games of the 2010 season and participated in a "passing of the collar" ceremony for Uga VIII before the Homecoming game against Vanderbilt. Less than three months later, Russ was once again called on to serve at the 2010 AutoZone Liberty Bowl, due to a then-unspecified illness suffered by Uga VIII (later revealed to be canine lymphoma). After the death of Uga VIII five weeks later, it was announced that Russ would continue as interim mascot indefinitely. Russ served during the entire 2011 season as interim mascot, and UGA Director of Athletics Greg McGarity announced on August 30, 2012, that Russ received a "battlefield promotion" and would assume the title of Uga IX. The official ceremony was conducted prior to the Georgia vs. Florida Atlantic home football game on Saturday, September 15, 2012. Uga IX died of natural causes on December 21, 2015, at 11 years-old. He was the only official Uga mascot to date that had visible brown markings, as other members were selected for an all-white hair coat or had markings that were hidden from view by the jersey. Epitaph: He endeared himself to the Georgia people. His dedication to duty when called upon was exemplary.
- Uga X ("Que", 2015–23) – Won two SEC championships (2017, 2022), one Rose Bowl (2018), one Sugar Bowl (2020), two Peach Bowls (2021, 2022), one Orange Bowl (2021) and two CFP National Championships (2022, 2023). A grandson of Uga IX, he was introduced at the November 21, 2015, game against Georgia Southern. At his retirement, he was the winningest Uga by total number of wins and percentage. In 2022, Uga X, and by extension all Uga's, were inducted in the Mascot Hall of Fame. Uga X died on January 23, 2024, at the age of 10. Epitaph: 'Nuff Said
- Uga XI ("Boom," 2023–present) – Won two SEC championships (2024, 2025) and one Orange Bowl (2023). The collar was passed to Uga XI prior to the G-Day public spring scrimmage on April 15, 2023.

=== Temporary mascots ===
Since 1956, four other bulldogs (three of which were from the Uga family line) have served as temporary sideline mascots when the current Uga was not available. The bulldog later known as Uga IX served two terms as an interim mascot before officially becoming Uga IX.

- Bugga Lou – 1971 – This unrelated, female, brown-and-white bulldog filled in for an ailing Uga II at the South Carolina and Florida games during the 1971 season.
- Argos/Knute – 1972 – The dog's given name at birth was Argos, but he had been given to another family member and had his name changed to Knute before he was called into service. Knute served as interim mascot for the first game of the 1972 season against Baylor, since Uga II had died and the future Uga III wasn't deemed to be mature enough to serve yet. Uga III was introduced for the second game of the 1972 season against North Carolina.
- Otto – 1986 – Otto, the older brother of Uga IV, filled in for him during four games in the 1986 season after Uga IV injured his left knee jumping off a hotel bed prior to a game against Vanderbilt. Otto compiled a 3–1 record and also served as co-mascot for the Georgia Tech game that year with Uga IV. Legendary former coach Vince Dooley has said that Otto was his favorite Georgia mascot, "because he came off the bench and got the job done."
- Magillicuddy I – 1989 – He filled in for an ailing Uga IV, his brother, at the 1989 Peach Bowl. Uga IV died after the end of the 1989 season, but Magillicuddy was considered to be too old to be named the new mascot.

== Georgia mascot history prior to Uga ==
Georgia officially claims the following animals as live mascots prior to the introduction of the Uga line in 1956.

- "Sir William" 1892 – A goat. Appeared at the Georgia–Mercer game on January 30, 1892 and first Auburn–Georgia game on February 22, 1892. It was dressed in a black coat with the letters "U.G." in red on each side.
- Trilby – 1894 – Georgia's first canine mascot, Trilby was a solid white female Bull Terrier owned by student Charles Black Sr. of Atlanta. After Trilby's 1894 reign, there is no official mascot acknowledged by the university for 50 years. According to the 2011 Georgia football media guide, "... chaos developed in the mascot department at the University. Many games had several, depending on which alumnus got his dog to the game first."
- Mr. Angel – 1944–46 – Mr. Angel was a brindle-and-white English Bulldog owned by Warren Coleman, a physician from Eastman, Georgia.
- Butch and Tuffy – 1947–48 (both), 1948–51 (only Butch) – Butch and Tuffy were brindled English Bulldogs owned by Mabry Smith of Warner Robins, Georgia. Smith agreed to loan the dogs to the University for use as mascots after bringing them to the 1946 Georgia Tech game (which was the final game of the 1946 regular season). Tuffy died of a heart attack after the 1948 Kentucky game, but Butch served by himself until he was shot and killed by a Warner Robins policeman while roaming the streets in the summer of 1951 after escaping from his pen.
- Mike – 1951–55 – Mike was a brindled English Bulldog owned by C.L. Fain, and during his time as mascot, he lived in the campus field house. Mike died due to natural causes in 1955. A bronze likeness of Mike stands outside of Memorial Hall on Georgia's campus near Sanford Stadium.

== Reception ==
Sports Illustrated have repeatedly named Uga college football's best live animal mascot and has called the Georgia mascot "one of the most recognizable traditions in sports." Joe Kovac Jr of The Macon Telegraph in explaining the fame of Uga says "The dog has become an ambassador on a leash. The college’s legions of alums and scores of otherwise unassociated fans who root, cheer and go woof-woof-woof for its teams for no other reason than the fact that they are the home team, view Uga as, well, Bulldog Nation in fur."

The University of Georgia has faced criticism for allegedly perpetuating a problematic emphasis on purebred lineage, raising concerns about ethical considerations in the breeding of bulldogs. People for the Ethical Treatment of Animals (PETA), have argued that "the public doesn't want to see animals used as props or forced to perform." Additionally, English bulldogs have developed myriad health conditions due to inbreeding — including breathing difficulties, hip dysplasia and heart disorders - which many descendants of Uga have died from.

== See also ==
- Bulldog breeds
- Bully – A similar dynasty of live bulldog mascots for the Mississippi State Bulldogs sports teams
- Butler Blue – The bulldog mascots of Butler University; part of a similar dynasty of mascots for the Butler Bulldogs
- Handsome Dan – A similar dynasty of live bulldog mascots for the Yale Bulldogs sports teams
- Jack the Bulldog – A similar dynasty of live bulldog mascots for the Georgetown Hoyas sports teams
- Tech – A similar dynasty of live bulldog mascots for the Louisiana Tech Bulldogs sports teams
- List of bulldog mascots
- List of individual dogs
- Hairy Dawg, UGA‘s costumed mascot
