= Hairy Dawg =

University of Georgia mascot

- Hairy Dawg at a home football game
- University: University of Georgia
- Conference: SEC
- Description: Anthropomorphic bulldog
- First seen: 1980
- Related mascot(s): Uga

Hairy Dawg is the costumed mascot of the University of Georgia Bulldogs. Hairy Dawg made his first appearance at the 1981 Sugar Bowl and has been an official mascot of UGA since. Hairy Dawg attends all Georgia Bulldogs football games and most home athletic events (including Georgia Bulldogs basketball, Georgia Lady Bulldogs basketball, Georgia Bulldogs baseball, Georgia Gym Dogs, tennis, volleyball, equestrian, and soccer). Forbes ranks Hairy Dawg No. 3 in their list of "America's Top 10 Sports Mascots".

== History ==
The first costumed bulldog at the University of Georgia was a gray anthropomorphic dog called "Fluffie," who was designed "[to capture] the hearts of children with his cuddly features and tumbling stunts." Fluffie was created in 1975 by the late Coach Mike Castronis.

The inspiration for Hairy Dawg came during the 1980 football season at the Florida vs. Georgia Football Classic, when Florida unveiled its new, more intimidating mascot. Compared to the rival's mascot, Georgia’s mascot at that time, Fluffie, was described as a "dark, dingy gray mutt with zero personality." Tom Sapp, a 1969 Georgia graduate and designer of the mascot explains, “I created Hairy Dawg to intimidate." Hairy's name derives from the popular Georgia cheer, "Go You Hairy Dogs!" Former University head football coach Vince Dooley was the first to be presented with the sketches for Hairy Dawg and wanted the mascot at the 1981 Sugar Bowl. After many long and stressful hours of sweating and stitching by Sapp, Hairy Dawg was ready in three weeks for the national championship game between the Georgia Bulldogs and Notre Dame Fighting Irish. UGA student cheerleader, Stan Beecham, was the first to dress out as Hairy Dawg when the Bulldogs went on to beat the Irish and were crowned national champions.

Hairy Dawg's first appearance in Sanford Stadium was not until the Georgia Bulldogs' 1981 home opener, a 44-0 shut-out of the Tennessee Volunteers.

== Media appearances ==
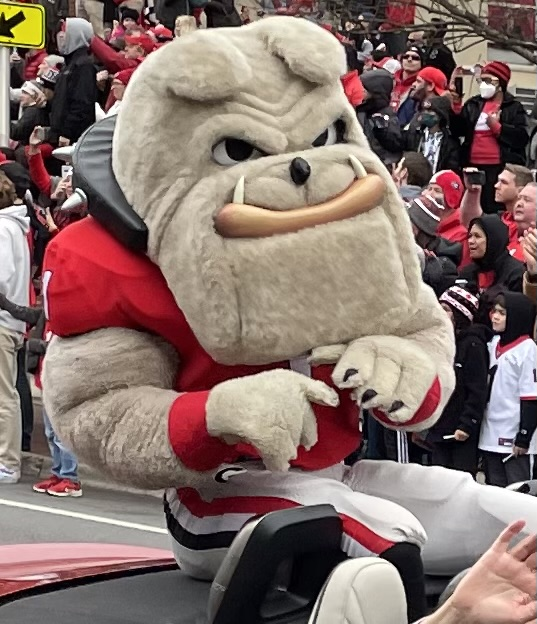
Hairy Dawg, 2022

In 2009, Forbes ranked Hairy Dawg No. 3 in their list of "America's Top 10 Sports Mascots".

Hairy Dawg has been selected to participate in the Capital One National Mascot of the Year Challenge in 2003, 2004, 2007, 2009, and 2011. In 2007, Hairy Dawg was a semifinalist in the competition. In 2008, he competed in the Mascot National Championship, finishing 7th place.

In 2010, Hairy Dawg appeared in three ESPN commercials. One commercial promoted ESPN's new 3D cable television network, ESPN 3D. The second, for Lee Corso's surprise birthday party on the set of College GameDay. The third, a This is SportsCenter commercial where Hairy Dawg runs through the cupboards of the ESPN kitchen until he finally finds some animal crackers.

In 2011, Hairy Dawg appeared in a number of Capital One National Mascot Challenge commercials.

In 2012, Hairy Dawg appeared in two This is SportsCenter commercials with former UGA quarterback Matthew Stafford.

== Spike ==
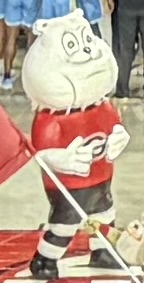
Spike, 2025

Hairy Dawg was joined by an inflatable bulldog mascot named "Spike" in 1998. Intended as a mascot to serve at Georgia volleyball games, Spike also appears at men's and women's basketball games and Gym Dogs women's gymnastics meets.

== See also ==
- Uga (mascot)
