= 1980 All-SEC football team =

American college football all-star team

The 1980 All-SEC football team consists of American football players selected to the All-Southeastern Conference (SEC) chosen by various selectors for the 1980 NCAA Division I-A football season.

== Offensive selections ==
=== Receivers ===
- Cris Collinsworth, Florida (AP-1, UPI)
- Mardye McDole, Miss. St. (AP-1, UPI)
- Anthony Hancock, Tennessee (AP-2)
- Byron Franklin, Auburn (AP-2)
- Ken Toler, Ole Miss (AP-2)

=== Tight ends ===
- Chris Faulkner, Florida (AP-1, UPI)
- Reggie Harper, Tennessee (AP-2)

=== Tackles ===
- Tim Irwin, Tennessee (AP-1, UPI)
- Alan Massey, Miss. St. (AP-1)

=== Guards ===
- Tim Morrison, Georgia (AP-1, UPI [as T])
- Wayne Harris, Miss. St. (AP-1)
- George Stephenson, Auburn (AP-2, UPI)
- Nat Hudson, Georgia (AP-2, UPI)
- Ken Hammond, Vanderbilt (AP-2)
- Chris Cottam, Ole Miss (AP-2)

=== Centers ===
- Ken Roark, Kentucky (AP-1)
- Lee North, Tennessee (AP-2, UPI)

=== Quarterbacks ===
- Buck Belue, Georgia (AP-1)
- John Fourcade, Ole Miss (AP-2, UPI)

=== Running backs ===
- Herschel Walker, Georgia (College Football Hall of Fame) (AP-1, UPI)
- James Brooks, Auburn (AP-1, UPI)
- Billy Jackson, Alabama (AP-2)
- Major Ogilvie, Alabama (AP-2)

== Defensive selections ==
=== Ends ===
- E. J. Junior, Alabama (AP-1, UPI)
- Lyman White, LSU (AP-1, UPI)
- Tyrone Keys, Miss. St. (AP-2)
- Tim Golden, Florida (AP-2)

=== Tackles ===
- Frank Warren, Auburn (AP-1)
- Eddie Weaver, Georgia (AP-1)
- Byron Braggs, Alabama (UPI)
- Jimmy Payne, Georgia (UPI)
- Glen Collins, Miss. St. (AP-2)
- David Galloway, Florida (AP-2)

=== Middle guards ===
- Jim Noonan, Tennessee (AP-1, UPI)
- Warren Lyles, Alabama (AP-2)

=== Linebackers ===
- Johnie Cooks, Miss. St. (AP-1, UPI)
- David Little, Florida (AP-1, UPI)
- Tom Boyd, Alabama (AP-1, UPI)
- Randy Scott, Alabama (AP-2)
- Andrew Coleman, Vanderbilt (AP-2)
- Al Richardson, LSU (AP-2)

=== Backs ===
- Scott Woerner, Georgia (AP-1, UPI)
- Jeff Hipp, Georgia (AP-1, UPI)
- Chris Williams, LSU (AP-1)
- Tommy Wilcox, Alabama (AP-1)
- Jim Bob Harris, Alabama (UPI)
- Cliff Toney, Auburn (AP-2)
- Ricky Tucker, Alabama (AP-2)
- Tim Groves, Florida (AP-2)

== Special teams ==
=== Kicker ===
- Rex Robinson, Georgia (AP-1, UPI)
- Alan Duncan, Tennessee (AP-2)

=== Punter ===
- Jim Arnold, Vanderbilt (AP-1, UPI)
- Mark Dickert, Florida (AP-2)

== Key ==
AP = Associated Press

UPI = United Press International

Bold = Consensus first-team selection by both AP and UPI

== See also ==
- 1980 College Football All-America Team
