= Rex Robinson (American football) =

American football player (born 1959)

No. 7
- Position: Placekicker

Personal information
- Born: March 17, 1959 (age 67); Marietta, Georgia, U.S.
- Listed height: 5 ft 11 in (1.80 m)
- Listed weight: 205 lb (93 kg)

Career information
- High school: Marietta
- College: Georgia
- NFL draft: 1981: 6th round, 146th overall pick

Career history
- Cincinnati Bengals (1981)*; Denver Broncos (1982)*; Miami Dolphins (1982)*; New England Patriots (1982); Buffalo Bills (1983)*
- * Offseason or practice squad member only

Awards and highlights
- National champion (1980); First-team All-American (1980); 3× First-team All-SEC (1978, 1979, 1980); All-SEC Freshman (1977)

Career NFL statistics
- Field goals: 1
- Field goal attempts: 2
- Field goal %: 50
- Longest field goal: 24
- Stats at Pro Football Reference

Rex Robinson (born March 17, 1959) is an American former professional football player who was a placekicker for the New England Patriots of the National Football League (NFL). He played in high school for the Marietta Blue Devils before playing collegiately for the Georgia Bulldogs of the Southeastern Conference (SEC).

== Early life and college ==
Originally from Marietta, Georgia, Robinson grew up watching the NFL’s latest curiosities, soccer style kickers, such as Jan Stenerud, Garo Yepremian, and Pete and Charlie Gogalak on television each Sunday and then tried to imitate what he saw them doing. By the time he reached high school, he was receiving a great deal of attention. As a 15-year-old on Marietta’s JV team, Robinson kicked a 51-yard field goal in a game. A local news station sent a crew out to verify the feat. It took a few tries, but Robinson duplicated the kick for the camera and was on the 6 o’clock news that night.

As a senior, Robinson received several scholarship offers but chose the University of Georgia. He would have the chance to play as a freshman, and UGA seemed the perfect distance from home. Robinson was the team's leading scorer and made the All-SEC Freshman Team in 1977. He would make 1st team All-SEC in 1978, 1979 & 1980 and Playboy All-American in 1979 and 1980. Robinson also made the Walter Camp, Football News, Football Writer’s, and UPI All-American teams in 1980. He was invited to play in the 1981 Senior Bowl. The highlight of his senior year was beating Notre Dame in the 1981 Sugar Bowl and the Bulldogs being named the 1980 National Champion football team.

Robinson finished with several SEC records, including the single-season FG% at 88.2%, career points (269), career field goals (56) and consecutive extra points (101). The last two categories were second in NCAA history at the time. He also had six FGs over 50 yards, with two 57-yarders in 1980. Robinson was honored in 2007 as The University of Georgia’s representative at the SEC Legends Dinner as a part of the SEC Championship weekend.

== Professional career ==
He was selected by the Cincinnati Bengals in the sixth round of the 1981 NFL draft with the 146th overall pick. He played for the New England Patriots in the strike-shortened season of 1982.

== Personal life ==
Robinson sells sporting goods, athletic and corporate apparel for Pro Sports Team Outfitters in Atlanta. He has also worked with hundreds of young kickers since 1996, and several have gone on to play on the collegiate level. He now has a kicking instruction service called Total Kicker.
