= Larry Munson =

American sports announcer (1922–2011)

- Munson in 1985
- Born: Lawrence Harry Munson; September 28, 1922; Minneapolis, Minnesota, U.S.
- Died: November 20, 2011 (aged 89); Athens, Georgia, U.S.
- Occupation: Sportscaster
- Spouse(s): Kathryn Stevens Nunnally (m. 1947, divorced) Martha 'Butch' Simmons (m. 1972, divorced)
- Children: 4

Lawrence Harry Munson (September 28, 1922 – November 20, 2011) was an American sports announcer and talk show host. He was best known for handling radio play-by-play of the Georgia Bulldogs football games from 1966 to 2008. He also handled the play-by-play for UGA basketball and Atlanta Falcons radio broadcasts and hosted sports-related talk shows.

== Early life and career ==
Originally from Minneapolis, Munson attended Roosevelt High School in Minneapolis and Minnesota State University Moorhead. While at MSUM, he played basketball as a center and guard and football as an end and tackle.

Munson served as a United States Army medic in an Army Hospital during World War II. Upon leaving the military, he spent all $200 of his mustering-out pay to enroll in a Minneapolis radio broadcasting school. His first job was at a Minneapolis arena announcing the names of boxers and wrestlers for $15 a week.

After an on-air job at the KDLR AM radio station in Devils Lake, North Dakota, Munson moved on to AM radio station KFBC in Cheyenne, Wyoming, as a sports reporter in 1946. At KFBC, Munson met and became friends with co-worker Curt Gowdy. At that time, Gowdy was also the football announcer for the Wyoming Cowboys. On January 1, 1946, Munson called the Sun Bowl between the University of Denver and the University of New Mexico for the Associated Broadcasting System. Later in 1946, Gowdy took a job in Oklahoma City, Oklahoma, as the announcer for a minor league baseball team and successfully recommended Munson as his replacement for the Wyoming Cowboys job. When Gowdy became a New York Yankees announcer in 1948, he recommended Munson again to replace him in Oklahoma City. Gowdy would later become a national sportscaster for NBC and CBS.

Munson broadcast in Oklahoma until 1952 when he moved to Nashville, Tennessee, for an announcing job with the Nashville Vols minor league baseball team on AM radio station WKDA. During the baseball off-season, Munson convinced local Nashville radio station WSM (AM) to broadcast Vanderbilt Commodores men's basketball games with himself as the announcer. The basketball broadcasts were immediately successful, and WSM added Vanderbilt Commodores football games to its schedule as well with Munson as the broadcaster. Munson, along with local sportsman Herman Waddell, created a local television show about hunting and fishing called The Rod & Gun Club on NBC affiliate WSM-TV (now WSMV), a local Nashville station.

In 1966, the Atlanta Braves Major League Baseball team hired Munson as part of their first broadcast team, after moving from Milwaukee to Atlanta.

The first year the Braves were in Atlanta, the television broadcasts were on WSB-TV. An occasional guest color commentator was former major leaguer Dizzy Dean. One memorable Friday night during a rain delay, Dean warbled several verses of the Wabash Cannonball and purchased peanuts from a vendor in the stands, much to Munson's on-air amusement.

In March 1966, Munson was in West Palm Beach, Florida, for the Braves' spring training and read in the Atlanta Journal that Georgia Bulldogs football radio announcer Ed Thilenius was resigning to become a broadcaster for the new Atlanta Falcons National Football League franchise. The next day, Munson called Georgia athletics director Joel Eaves to express his interest in the Georgia job, and Munson was hired shortly thereafter. Athens radio station WRFC held the broadcast contract and was the parent station for the Georgia Bulldogs. After announcing Braves games for the first two months of the baseball season, Munson returned to Nashville in June 1966 to continue The Rod & Gun Club for Nashville's WSM-TV, and prepare for his new role with the Bulldogs. For many years after joining the University of Georgia broadcasts, Munson would make the commute to Athens, Georgia for the weekend football games from his home in Nashville so that he could continue producing The Rod & Gun Club during the week. During 1973, Munson was for a brief period news anchor for a rival Nashville TV station, WSIX-TV, now WKRN. His engineer for many years was L.H. Christian, the owner of WRFC radio, who ran the audio board out of personal interest and for fun; Christian was sometimes joined by Larry Melear or Everett Langford as engineer for the sports broadcasts. Munson continued to live in Nashville until 1978 when he moved to metro Atlanta, after joining the Georgia Radio Network as a reporter. Munson moved to Athens in 1997. On September 22, 2008, Larry announced his retirement from being the play-by-play announcer for the University of Georgia Bulldogs.

== Awards and recognition ==
Munson has received numerous awards honoring his accomplishments. In 2003, he received the Chris Schenkel Award presented by the National Football Foundation and College Football Hall of Fame. Munson was inducted into the Georgia-Florida Hall of Fame in 2004 and the Georgia Sports Hall of Fame in 2005. The National Sportscasters and Sportswriters Association awarded Munson its state-based Sportscaster of the Year Award on multiple occasions: 1960 (WSM, Nashville), 1963 (WSM), 1964 (WSM), 1965 (WSM) and 1969 (WSIX, Nashville) as the Tennessee Sportscaster of the year; 1967 (WSB, Atlanta), 1971 (WRFC, Athens), 1982 (Georgia Network, Atlanta), 2002 (WSB) as the Georgia Sportscaster of the year. In 2007, Munson was presented with an honorary varsity letter from the University of Georgia for his contributions to Bulldog football.

== Voice of the Bulldogs ==
Munson's gravelly voice was one of the most distinctive in all of U.S. sports announcing and was regarded as endearing by Georgia Bulldog fans. Unlike many of his peers, Munson avoided any pretense of journalistic objectivity or accuracy during his broadcasts. He was an unabashed Bulldog fan who almost always referred to the Bulldogs as "we." However, despite his open and unashamed homerism, he generally espoused a dour or pessimistic view of the team. For that reason, his broadcasts were considered among the modern generation of sportscasters as not only acceptable, but sometimes even more authentic than contemporary sportscasting. His unique turns of phrase – which were virtually always made offhand – became a part of Bulldog fan vernacular.

== Later years ==
Approaching his 85th birthday in 2007, Munson was in failing health and planned to call only UGA home games that season. Prior to the 2007 season, Munson had missed only one game as announcer, a 34–3 loss to Clemson on October 6, 1990: he was recuperating from back surgery and Dave O'Brien substituted. Munson also called the Georgia-Georgia Tech game which was at Georgia Tech in 2007.

In the spring of 2008, Munson suffered a subdural hematoma and required emergency surgery. After undergoing rehabilitation at the Shepherd Center in Atlanta, his family announced that he would be returning to call the home games in the fall of 2008. However, on September 22, 2008, Munson and his family announced that he would be retiring from the booth effective immediately. The road crew of Scott Howard and former UGA quarterback Eric Zeier finished out the season calling all games on the Georgia Bulldogs Radio Network.

Munson also provided the voice of God in an episode of the Adult Swim original series Squidbillies.

Munson died in Athens on November 20, 2011, after complications from pneumonia. Some 3,500 fans attended a tribute ceremony at Sanford Stadium on December 10, 2011.

== Famous calls ==
Some of Munson's well known calls include:

- "Appleby! The end around! Just stopped, planted his feet and threw it! And Washington caught it. Thinking of Montreal and the Olympics, and ran out of his shoes down the middle - 80 yards! Gator Bowl! Rocking! Stunned! The girders are bending now! Look at the score!"---calling Bulldog tight end Richard Appleby's 80-yard touchdown pass to wide receiver Gene Washington against Florida in 1975.
- "Touchdown! My God, a touchdown! We threw it to Haynes! We just stuffed them with five seconds left! My God Almighty, did you see what he did? David Greene just straightened up and we snuck the fullback over! … we just stepped on their face with a hobnailed boot and broke their nose! We just crushed their face!"—calling Bulldog quarterback David Greene's game-winning touchdown pass to Verron Haynes against Tennessee in 2001.
- "Florida in a stand-up five, they may or may not blitz, they won't. Buck back. Third down on the 8. In trouble. Got a block behind him. Going to throw on the run. Complete to the 25, to the 30. Lindsay Scott 35, 40. Lindsay Scott 45, 50, 45, 40. Run Lindsay! Twenty-five, 20, 15, 10, 5. Lindsay Scott! Lindsay Scott! Lindsay Scott! ... Well, I can't believe it. 92 yards and Lindsay really got in a footrace, I broke my chair, I came right through a chair, a metal STEEL chair with about a five inch cushion ... Do you know what is gonna happen here tonight? And up at St. Simons and Jekyll Island and all those places where all those Dawg people have got those condominiums for four days? MAN, is there gonna be some property destroyed tonight! 26 to 21, Dawgs on top! We were gone. I gave up, you did too. We were out of it and gone. Miracle!"---calling wide receiver Lindsay Scott's 92-yard touchdown reception from quarterback Buck Belue against UF in 1980.
- "Hunker down, you guys! If you didn't hear me, you guys, hunker down!...I know I'm asking a lot, you guys, but hunker it down one more time!"---calling a defensive series late in the game against Auburn in 1982, which clinched the SEC title for Georgia.
- "We hand it off to Herschel, there's a hole....5....10...12, he's running over people! Oh, you Herschel Walker!...My God Almighty, he ran right through two men! Herschel ran right over two men! They had him dead away inside the 9. Herschel Walker went 16 yards. He drove right over those orange shirts and is just driving and running with those big thighs. My God, a freshman!"---calling Herschel Walker's first touchdown run against the Tennessee Volunteers in 1980.
- "Look at the sugar falling out of the sky!"---calling the end of the Auburn game in 1982, after seeing the Georgia fans who had brought sugar packets into the stadium and were throwing sugar into the air at the end of the game symbolic of the SEC Title and Sugar Bowl bid that UGA had just secured with that victory.
- "So we'll try to kick one a hundred thousand miles. We're holding it on our own 49-and-a-half ... gonna try to kick it sixty yards plus a foot-and-a-half ... and Butler kicked a long one ... a long one ... Oh my God! Oh my God! ... The stadium is worse than bonkers! Eleven seconds, I can't believe what he did! This is ungodly!"---calling Kevin Butler's field goal in the final seconds to beat Clemson in 1984..
- "Man, we've had some shots, haven't we? Snap to David Greene, there he goes again in the corner and we jump up....Touchdown! Oh, God, a touchdown! In the corner with 85 seconds..."---calling David Greene's touchdown pass to Michael Johnson as Georgia defeated Auburn in 2002, clinching the Bulldogs' first-ever SEC Eastern Division championship.
- "Our hearts they was torn out and bleeding, we picked it up and we stuck it back inside. I can't believe this. We won 27-24, and at the end we had no business winning this game."---calling the last minute UGA win over Ga Tech in 1997.

== Personal life ==
Munson married twice and had four sons: two with first wife Kathryn Stevens Nunnally, and two with second wife Martha 'Butch' Simmons. Between marriages, Munson dated Sondra Locke. He was single at the time of his death.

== Related pages ==
- Georgia Bulldogs
