= David Greene (American football) =

American football player (born 1982)

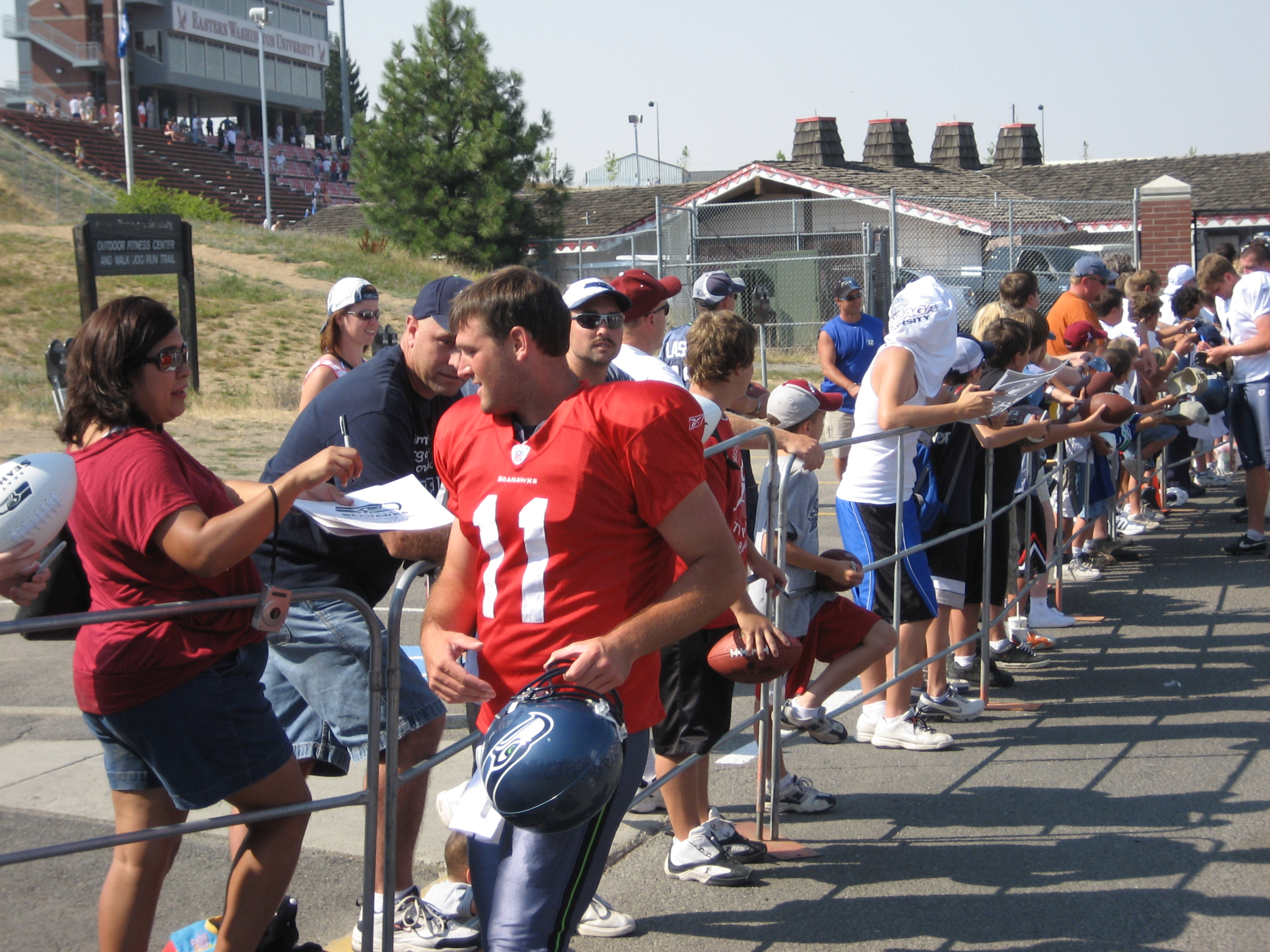
- Greene in 2006

No. 8, 14, 11
- Position: Quarterback

Personal information
- Born: June 22, 1982 (age 44); Snellville, Georgia, U.S.
- Listed height: 6 ft 3 in (1.91 m)
- Listed weight: 226 lb (103 kg)

Career information
- High school: South Gwinnett (Snellville)
- College: Georgia
- NFL draft: 2005: 3rd round, 85th overall pick

Career history
- Seattle Seahawks (2005–2006); New England Patriots (2007)*; Kansas City Chiefs (2007); Indianapolis Colts (2008)*
- * Offseason or practice squad member only

Awards and highlights
- First-team All-SEC (2002); 2× Second-team All-SEC (2003, 2004); SEC Freshman of the Year (2001)

David Norman Greene (born June 22, 1982) is an American former professional football player who was a quarterback in the National Football League (NFL). He played college football for the Georgia Bulldogs. Green was selected by the Seattle Seahawks in the third round of the 2005 NFL draft. He was also a member of the New England Patriots, Kansas City Chiefs, and Indianapolis Colts. He retired following the 2008 season, having never played in a regular season game.

== Early life ==
While attending South Gwinnett High School in Snellville, Georgia, David Greene was a two-sport standout as a quarterback in football, and as a right fielder in baseball. In football, he led his team to two consecutive playoff appearances and as a senior, he completed 134 passes out of 227 pass attempts (59.0 completion percentage) for 2,102 yards, and 19 touchdowns, and earned USA Today All-USA Honorable Mention honors, The Atlanta Journal-Constitution Super 11 honors, Super Southern 100 honors, Top 75 in Georgia honors, Class AAAA All-State honors, Georgia Sports Writers Association AAAA All-State honors, was named the Gwinnett County co-Offensive Player of the Year, Atlanta Touchdown Club Quarterback of the Year, Gwinnett Touchdown Club All-Star quarterback, and Atlanta Club Quarterback of the Year. After his senior season, he participated in the Georgia-Florida All-Star game.

== College career ==
Greene played quarterback at the University of Georgia in college. He began his career as a redshirt freshman in 2001, being named the starter before the season. His most notable freshman game occurred at #5 Tennessee on October 6, known as the "Hobnail Boot" game. This phrase was coined by Georgia's famous play-by-play announcer Larry Munson. After Tennessee took the lead in the fourth quarter on a successful screen pass with :44 left, Greene led the Bulldogs back down the field with an inspiring series of quick passes. The winning touchdown pass went to fullback Verron Haynes in a now famous play known as "P-44 Haynes" or the "Hobnail Boot" play with just five seconds remaining on the clock. Upon Greene's completion to Haynes in the endzone for the winning touchdown, announcer Munson made this fateful call: "We just stepped on their face with a hobnail boot and broke their nose. We just crushed their face!"

This play marked the beginning of Greene's record-setting career at Georgia, highlighted by guiding the team to a Sugar Bowl victory in 2002. The same season he led the Bulldogs to their first SEC championship since 1982. He was named SEC Offensive Rookie of the Year after the 2001 season, and was the 2002 Offensive Player of the Year for The Southeastern Conference. In 2004, Greene made 214 consecutive pass attempts without an interception, a record that stood until broken by Andre Woodson from Kentucky in 2007.

At Georgia, one of Greene's roommates was friend and future Cincinnati Bengals defensive end David Pollack, who was drafted 17th in 2005. The two played football together when they were younger in Snellville, though they went to different high schools.

Greene finished his college career as the winningest quarterback in NCAA Division I history with 42 wins in four years, eclipsing the record previously held by Peyton Manning. However, on November 21, 2009, University of Texas quarterback Colt McCoy broke his record with a win over University of Kansas. Greene finished his college career as the Southeastern Conference all-time career leader in yards gained with 11,270 until that record was broken by Aaron Murray on October 5, 2013, against Tennessee.

=== Statistics ===
Season	Team	Games (Note: Greene’s statistics from the 2001 Music City Bowl are excluded, as bowl game statistics were not officially counted toward season or career totals prior to 2002.)			Passing								Rushing			
Season	Team	GP	GS	Record	Cmp	Att	Pct	Yds	Y/A	TD	Int	Rtg	Att	Yds	Avg	TD
2000	Georgia	0	0	—	Redshirted (redshirt)											
2001	Georgia	12	12	8–4	192	324	59.3	2,789	8.6	17	9	145.3	47	41	0.9	1
2002	Georgia	14	14	13–1	218	379	57.5	2,924	7.7	22	8	137.3	65	−52	−0.8	2
2003	Georgia	14	14	11–3	264	438	60.3	3,307	7.6	13	11	128.5	69	−180	−2.6	1
2004	Georgia	12	12	10–2	175	299	58.5	2,508	8.4	20	4	148.4	23	−67	−2.9	1
Career		52	52	42−10	849	1,440	59.0	11,528	8.0	72	32	138.3	204	−258	−1.3	5

=== Awards and honors ===
- SEC Freshman of the Year (2001)
- SEC Championship Game MVP (2002)
- First-team All-SEC (2002)
- Second-team All-SEC (2003)
- Citrus Bowl MVP (2004)
- Second-team All-SEC (2004)
- Johnny Unitas Golden Arm Award finalist (2004)

== Professional career ==
Pre-draft measurables
Height	Weight	Arm length	Hand span	40-yard dash	10-yard split	20-yard split	20-yard shuttle	Three-cone drill	Vertical jump	Broad jump	Wonderlic
6 ft 3 1/2 in (1.92 m)	226 lb (103 kg)	33 1/4 in (0.84 m)	10 in (0.25 m)	4.78 s	1.66 s	2.74 s	4.13 s	7.00 s	31.5 in (0.80 m)	9 ft 7 in (2.92 m)	21
All values from NFL Combine

=== Seattle Seahawks ===
Greene was drafted in the third round, 85th overall, in the 2005 NFL Draft. He spent 2006 #3 on the Seahawks' depth chart, behind Matt Hasselbeck and Seneca Wallace. He had been expected to compete with Seneca Wallace to be #2 on the Seahawks' depth chart for the 2007 NFL Season, but disappointed with his play during the preseason. At one point, coach Mike Holmgren expressed his dissatisfaction with Greene's progress as a quarterback. In September 2007, Greene was released by the Seahawks.

=== New England Patriots ===
Greene was signed to the New England Patriots' practice squad on September 19, 2007, only to be released on November 20, 2007.

=== Kansas City Chiefs ===
Greene was then signed to the practice squad of the Kansas City Chiefs, and eventually promoted to the active roster on December 29, 2007. He was waived by the team on July 18, 2008.

=== Indianapolis Colts ===
Greene was signed to the practice squad of the Indianapolis Colts on September 25, 2008, after the team released quarterback Josh Betts. The Colts released Greene on November 14, 2008.

== Post-retirement ==
In January 2009, Greene told the Gwinnett Daily Post that he was retiring from professional football. He returned to Atlanta in September 2008 and joined an insurance brokerage firm, Sterling Seacrest Partners, along with fellow former Bulldog Matt Stinchcomb.

Greene appeared on MLB Network's "The Next Knuckler", in which the winner received a chance to go to spring training with the Arizona Diamondbacks as a knuckleball pitcher. Greene finished second to Josh Booty.

== See also ==
- List of Division I FBS passing yardage leaders
