= Matt Stinchcomb =

American football player (born 1977)

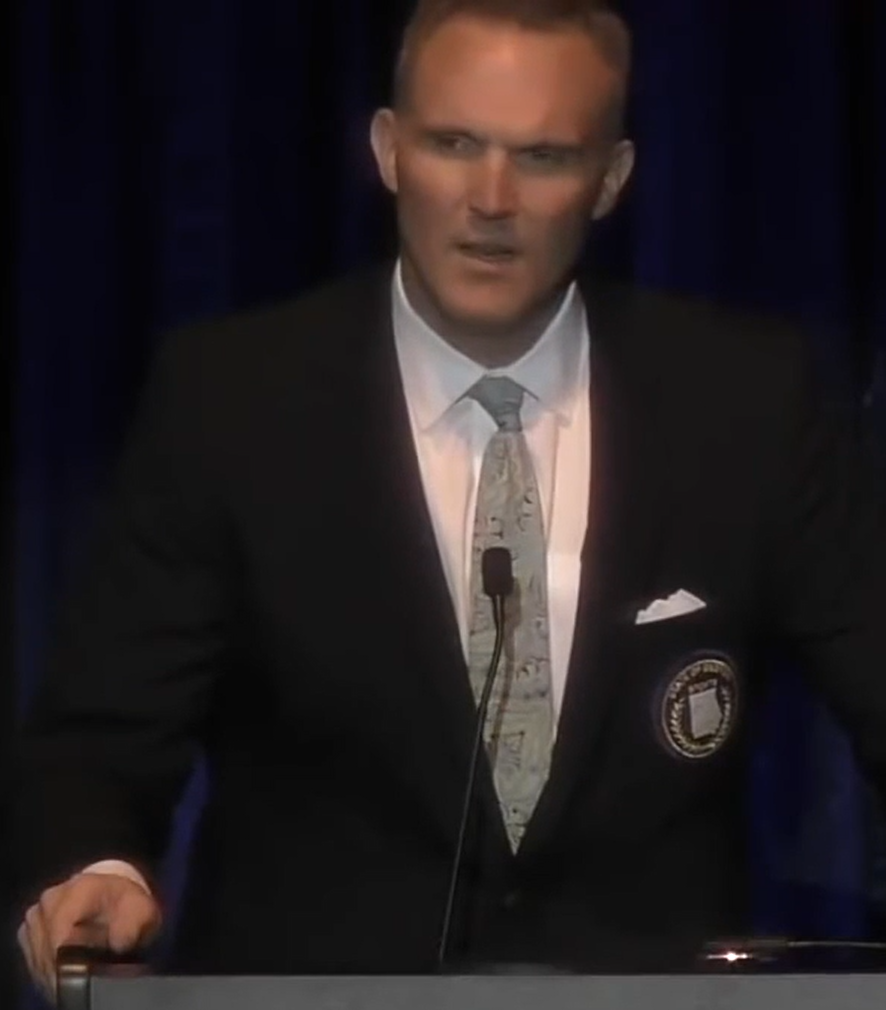
- Stinchcomb in 2021

No. 74, 78
- Position: Offensive tackle

Personal information
- Born: June 3, 1977 (age 49); Atlanta, Georgia, U.S.
- Listed height: 6 ft 6 in (1.98 m)
- Listed weight: 330 lb (150 kg)

Career information
- High school: Parkview (Lilburn, Georgia)
- College: Georgia
- NFL draft: 1999: 1st round, 18th overall pick

Career history
- Oakland Raiders (1999–2003); Tampa Bay Buccaneers (2004–2005)

Awards and highlights
- Consensus All-American (1998); First-team All-American (1997); Draddy Trophy (1998); Jacobs Blocking Trophy (1998); Jim Parker Trophy (1998); 2× First-team All-SEC (1997, 1998); Florida–Georgia Hall of Fame

Career NFL statistics
- Games played: 65
- Games started: 36
- Stats at Pro Football Reference
- College Football Hall of Fame

Matthew Douglas Stinchcomb (born June 3, 1977) is an American former professional football player who was an offensive lineman for seven seasons in the National Football League (NFL). He played college football for the Georgia Bulldogs, earning All-American honors. He was a first-round pick in the 1999 NFL draft, and played professionally for the Oakland Raiders and Tampa Bay Buccaneers of the NFL.

== Early life ==
Stinchcomb was born in Atlanta, Georgia. He attended Parkview High School in Lilburn, Georgia, and played for the Parkview Panthers high school football team.

== College career ==
Stinchcomb attended the University of Georgia, where he played for the Georgia Bulldogs football team from 1995 to 1998. He was a first-team All-American selection at tackle in 1997, and was recognized as a consensus first-team All-American following the 1998 season.

== Professional career ==
Stinchcomb was selected as the 18th pick of the first round in the 1999 NFL draft to the Oakland Raiders. He missed his entire rookie season due to a shoulder injury and surgery. He started the first eight games at left tackle the following season before suffering a knee and shoulder injury. This led to his move inside the offensive line to guard and center. He started every game during his only healthy season in 2004 with Tampa Bay. In the following season, he injured his back in practice, requiring surgery. Complications from the surgery led to blood clots and a heart condition, forcing his retirement in 2006.

In 2009, Stinchcomb was named to the University of Georgia's Circle of Honor, the highest level of distinction for any UGA student-athlete. He also represented Georgia in being named to the 2009 class of "SEC Legends" which was recognized during pregame of the SEC Championship Game.

== Personal life ==
He is the older brother of Jon Stinchcomb, who was also an All-American offensive tackle at Georgia and who played with the New Orleans Saints. Matt, Jon, and former Georgia quarterback David Greene host a children's charity event each year at Georgia, "Countdown to Kickoff," for Georgia football fans.

Stinchcomb is married and has three children.

== Life after football ==
Stinchcomb is currently a college football analyst for ESPNU and SEC Network.

He and David Greene operate the Atlanta offices of Seacrest Partners, an insurance brokerage firm in Atlanta.

In 2018, Stinchcomb was inducted into the College Football Hall of Fame.
