= Nat Hudson (American football) =

American football player (born 1957)

No. 69, 63
- Position: Guard

Personal information
- Born: October 11, 1957 (age 69); Rome, Georgia, U.S.
- Listed height: 6 ft 3 in (1.91 m)
- Listed weight: 268 lb (122 kg)

Career information
- High school: West Rome
- College: Georgia
- NFL draft: 1981: 6th round, 139th overall pick

Career history
- New Orleans Saints (1981); Baltimore Colts (1982); Jacksonville Bulls (1984–1985)

Awards and highlights
- First-team All-SEC (1980)

Career NFL statistics
- Games played: 18
- Games started: 2
- Fumble recoveries: 1
- Stats at Pro Football Reference

Nat Hudson (born October 11, 1957) is an American former professional football player who was a guard in the National Football League (NFL). He played for the New Orleans Saints in 1981, the Baltimore Colts in 1982 and the Jacksonville Bulls from 1984 to 1985. He played college football for the Georgia Bulldogs.
