= Lindsay Scott =

American football player (born 1960)

No. 80
- Position: Wide receiver

Personal information
- Born: December 6, 1960 (age 65); Jesup, Georgia, U.S.
- Listed height: 6 ft 1 in (1.85 m)
- Listed weight: 194 lb (88 kg)

Career information
- High school: Wayne County (Jesup)
- College: Georgia
- NFL draft: 1982: 1st round, 13th overall pick

Career history
- New Orleans Saints (1982–1985); Atlanta Falcons (1986)*
- * Offseason or practice squad member only

Awards and highlights
- PFWA All-Rookie Team (1982); National champion (1980); First-team All-SEC (1981); Florida–Georgia Hall of Fame

Career NFL statistics
- Receptions: 69
- Receiving yards: 864
- Touchdowns: 1
- Stats at Pro Football Reference

Lindsay Eugene Scott (born December 6, 1960) is an American former professional football player who was a wide receiver for the New Orleans Saints of the National Football League (NFL). He played college football for the Georgia Bulldogs. He was the 13th overall pick in the 1982 NFL draft and played four seasons for the Saints. He was inducted into the Florida–Georgia Hall of Fame in 1997.

== Run, Lindsay ==
In 1980, during the Florida–Georgia game, deep in their own territory, with a perfect season on the line and only a minute left in the game, Georgia quarterback Buck Belue hit Scott at the Georgia 25-yard-line in stride. Scott darted through Florida's secondary and reached the end zone with only seconds left.

Long-time Georgia radio announcer Larry Munson's play-by-play gave the game and play its name:

Florida in a stand-up five, they may or may not blitz, they won't... Buck back, third down on the eight. In trouble! Got a block behind him... Gonna throw on the run—complete on the 25. To the 30, Lindsay Scott 35, 40, Lindsay Scott 45, 50, 45, 40—Run, Lindsay!--25, 20, 15, 10, 5, Lindsay Scott! Lindsay Scott! Lindsay Scott!!

The game kept alive Georgia's chance for the national title, which they ended up winning.

In 2010 Robbie Burns published Belue to Scott!: The Greatest Moment in Georgia Football History, which details this play.

== NFL lawsuit ==
In May 2012, Scott was one of more than 100 former NFL players that sued the league over brain injuries from concussions.
