= Buck Belue =

American football and baseball player (born 1959)

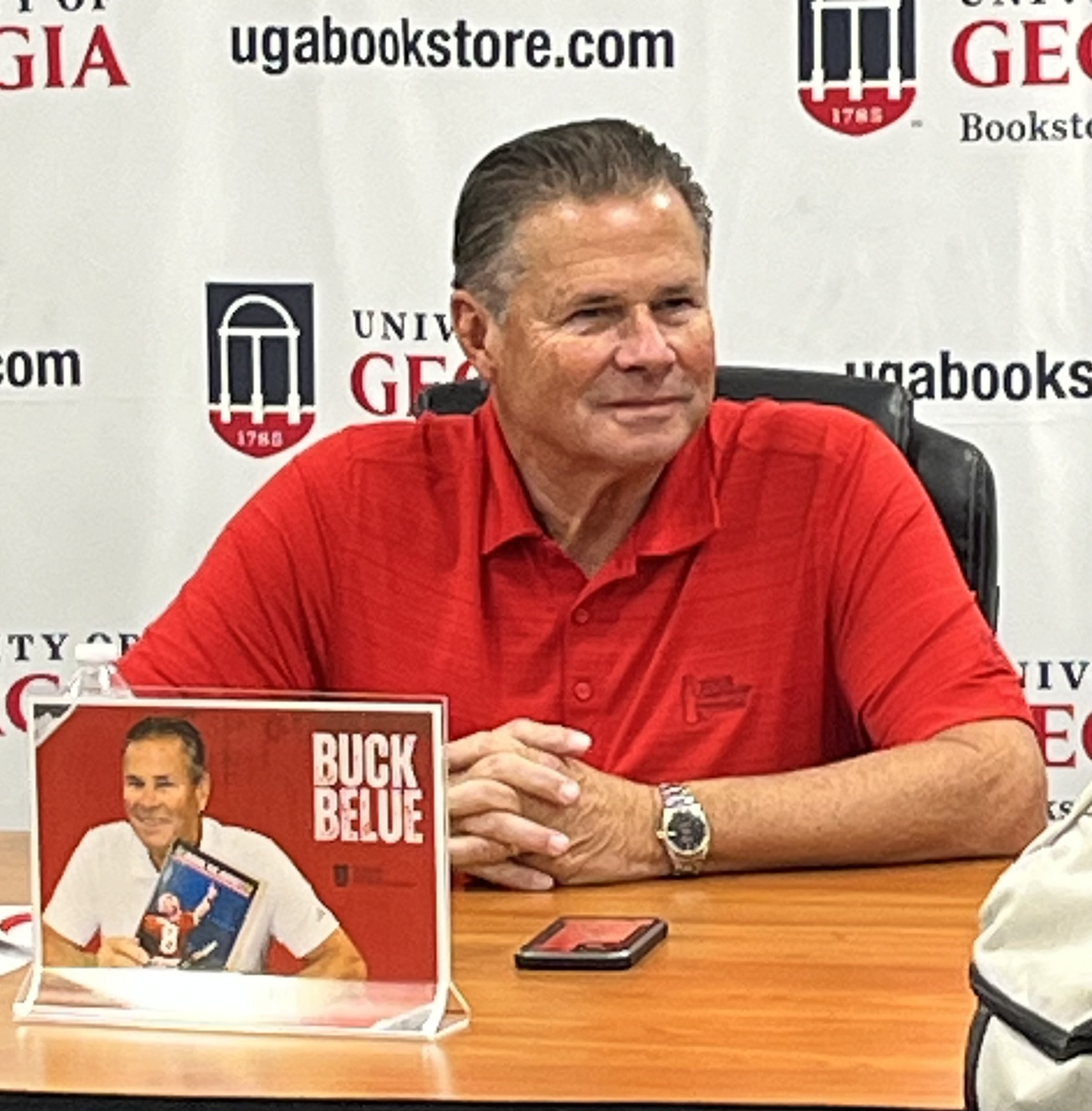
- Belue in 2024

No. 8 – Georgia Bulldogs
- Position: Quarterback

Personal information
- Born: December 12, 1959 (age 66); Macon, Georgia, U.S.

Career information
- College: Georgia (1978–1981)

Awards and highlights
- National champion (1980); SEC Athlete of the Year (1982); 2× First-team All-SEC (1980, 1981)

Benjamin Franklin "Buck" Belue III (born December 12, 1959) is an American sports radio host and former professional football and baseball player who played both sports at the University of Georgia from 1978 to 1981. He was the quarterback for the Georgia Bulldogs in 1980, when the team went 12–0, and, after beating Notre Dame in the Sugar Bowl, was named the consensus national champion. One of the key plays in the 1980 season was a 93-yard touchdown pass from Belue to wide receiver Lindsay Scott that led to a victory over Florida, which was at one time tied with two other passing plays as the longest passing touchdown in Georgia history. This record was later broken by Aaron Murray's 98-yard touchdown pass to Reggie Davis in Georgia's victory over North Texas in 2013. Belue was named captain of the 1981 team.

Belue also lettered in baseball all four years at Georgia. His career batting average at Georgia was .356 and he went on to play three years in the Montreal Expos organization. Belue also played during the 1984 and 1985 seasons at quarterback for the Jacksonville Bulls of the USFL. After the demise of the USFL, Belue spent two years on the football coaching staff at Valdosta State, serving as an offensive assistant.

Since 2000, Belue has been a sports radio host with WCNN in Atlanta, Georgia. For twenty years, he co-hosted Buck and Kincade mostly during mid-days with John Kincade. In September 2020, the show was recast as Buck and Hut, pairing Belue with fellow former Georgia Bulldogs quarterback Hutson Mason after Kincade was laid off by the station. Later, Mason was moved to a new time slot and Belue was given his own show, entitled The Buck Belue Show.

Belue was inducted into the Georgia-Florida Hall of Fame in 1996. He is the only quarterback to start all four years for the Valdosta High School Wildcats and was inducted as a member of the Valdosta High School Hall of Fame in 2007.
