= Verron Haynes =

American football player (born 1979)

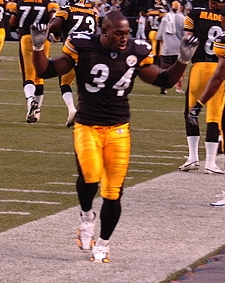
- Haynes with the Pittsburgh Steelers in 2005

No. 34, 36
- Position: Running back

Personal information
- Born: February 17, 1979 (age 47); Trinidad and Tobago
- Listed height: 5 ft 10 in (1.78 m)
- Listed weight: 222 lb (101 kg)

Career information
- High school: North Springs (Sandy Springs, Georgia, U.S.)
- College: Georgia
- NFL draft: 2002: 5th round, 166th overall pick

Career history
- Pittsburgh Steelers (2002–2007); Atlanta Falcons (2009)

Awards and highlights
- Super Bowl champion (XL)

Career NFL statistics
- Rushing attempts: 174
- Rushing yards: 738
- Rushing touchdowns: 3
- Receptions: 61
- Receiving yards: 449
- Receiving touchdowns: 2
- Stats at Pro Football Reference

Verron Ulric Haynes (/vəˈrɒn/ və-RON; born February 17, 1979) is a Trinidadian-born former American football running back. He was selected by the Pittsburgh Steelers in the fifth round of the 2002 NFL draft, following three successful college football seasons at the University of Georgia. With the Steelers, he won Super Bowl XL.

Haynes appeared on the cover of Pittsburgh Magazine's 25 Most Beautiful People issue in January 2007. As of 2010, Haynes serves as an International commentator and television personality for ESPN International.

Born in Trinidad and Tobago, before moving to New York City at age seven and then to Atlanta, Georgia, where he played high school football for North Springs High School. His father Ulric "Buggy" Haynes was a soccer player in the Trinidad and Tobago national team.

== Professional career ==
=== Pittsburgh Steelers ===
In five seasons with the Steelers from 2002 to 2006, Haynes gained 660 yards on 159 carries (4.2 average per carry) and three touchdowns. He also recorded 39 receptions for 322 yards (8.3 average per reception) and two touchdowns, including one from wide receiver Antwaan Randle El. Haynes missed most of the 2006 season due to a knee injury.

On March 1, 2007, he was cut by the Steelers in order to save cap room. However, he re-signed with the team on June 4, 2007. On September 1, 2007, he was released again. He was re-signed on December 24 when starting running back Willie Parker was placed on injured reserve.

=== Atlanta Falcons ===
Haynes signed with the Atlanta Falcons on April 29, 2009.

On December 5, 2009, he was released by the Falcons and re-signed on December 8, 2009.

== Personal ==
Haynes’ son, Justice, is a running back at Georgia Tech.

Haynes serves on the board of directors of TurningPoint, a women's health care organization in Alpharetta, Georgia. He is involved in philanthropic efforts and the forming of The Red Sail Watersports company. In addition, Haynes runs The Verron Haynes Foundation and football clinics and camps and comments for ESPN International.
