= 1981 Sugar Bowl =

- 47th Sugar Bowl
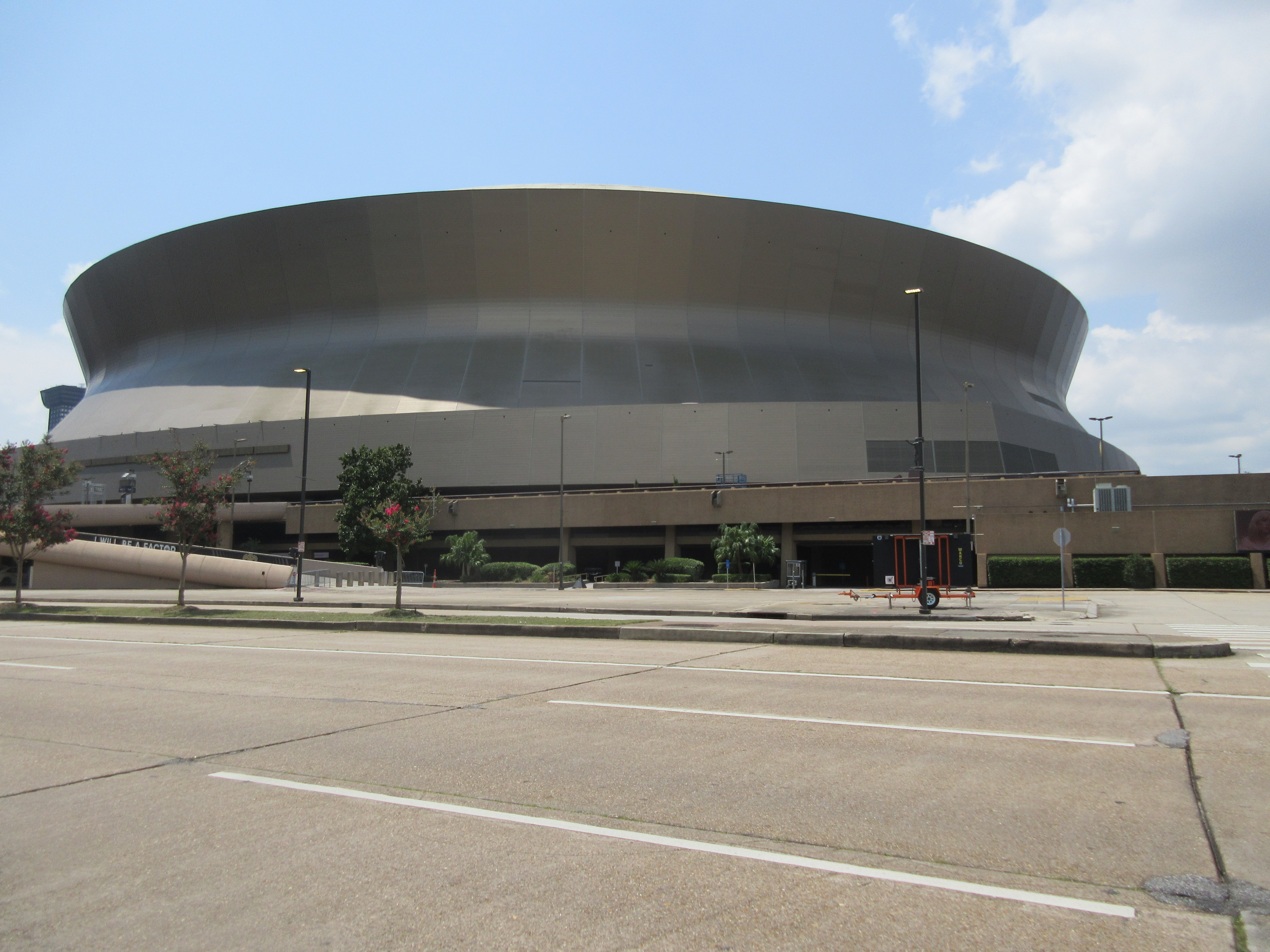
- The Louisiana Superdome in New Orleans, Louisiana, hosted the Sugar Bowl.
Georgia Bulldogs	Notre Dame Fighting Irish
(11–0)	(9–1–1)
SEC	Independent
17	10
Head coach: Vince Dooley	Head coach: Dan Devine
AP / Coaches; 1 / 1	AP / Coaches; 7 / 8
	1	2	3	4	Total
Georgia	10	7	0	0	17
Notre Dame	3	0	7	0	10
- Date: January 1, 1981
- Season: 1980
- Stadium: Louisiana Superdome
- Location: New Orleans, Louisiana
- MVP: Herschel Walker (Georgia RB)
- Favorite: Notre Dame by 1 point
- Referee: Clint Fuller (SWC)

United States TV coverage
- Network: ABC
- Announcers: Keith Jackson and Frank Broyles

The 1981 Sugar Bowl was the 47th edition of the college football bowl game, played at the Louisiana Superdome in New Orleans, Louisiana, on Thursday, January 1. Part of the 1980–81 bowl game season, it matched the undefeated and top-ranked Georgia Bulldogs of the Southeastern Conference, and the seventh-ranked Notre Dame Fighting Irish. A slight underdog, Georgia won, 17–10.

== Game summary ==
The game kicked off shortly after 1 p.m. CST, televised by ABC, at the same time as the Cotton Bowl on CBS.

In the first quarter, Notre Dame scored first on a 50-yard Harry Oliver field goal. Another Notre Dame scoring opportunity in the first quarter was foiled when Bulldog freshman Terry Hoage blocked a field goal. Hoage had been a last-minute addition to the roster by head coach Vince Dooley for his kick blocking ability. Due to good field position Georgia's Rex Robinson would eventually boot a 46-yard field goal of his own to tie the game at three.

On the ensuing kickoff, a communication gaffe between the Irish's deep return players resulted in neither one fielding the kick which bounced at the one-yard line and was recovered by Georgia's Bob Kelly. Two plays later, Bulldog running back Herschel Walker scored on a one-yard touchdown run as Georgia led 10–3. In the second quarter, Walker scored on a three-yard run making the score 17–3 at halftime.

The only score in the second half came in the third quarter; Notre Dame scored on a one-yard run to close the margin to 17–10. Georgia's defense held on to that lead, giving Georgia the victory and the 1980 national championship.

True freshman Walker rushed for 150 yards and was named Sugar Bowl MVP. Bulldog defensive back Scott Woerner made several key plays throughout the day including a late game interception that sealed the win. Georgia was first in both final polls.

=== Scoring ===
First quarter

- Notre Dame – Harry Oliver 50-yard field goal
- Georgia – Rex Robinson 46-yard field goal
- Georgia – Herschel Walker 1-yard run (Robinson kick)

Second quarter

- Georgia – Walker 2-yard run (Robinson kick)

Third quarter

- Notre Dame – Phil Carter 1-yard run (Oliver kick)

Fourth quarter

No scoring

== Statistics ==
Statistics	Georgia	Notre Dame
First downs	10	17
Rushing yards	52–120	50–190
Passing yards	7	138
Passing	1–13–0	12–28–3
Total offense	65–127	78–328
Punts–average	11–38.5	5–42.0
Fumbles–lost	0–0	1–1
Turnovers	0	4
Penalties–yards	6–32	8–69

== Note ==
This Sugar Bowl marked the debut of Georgia's costumed mascot Hairy Dawg.

Georgia native President Jimmy Carter was in attendance, three weeks before leaving office.
