= 1980 Garden State Bowl =

American college football game

Navy Midshipmen	Houston Cougars
(8–3)	(6–5)
0	35
Head coach: George Welsh	Head coach: Bill Yeoman
	1	2	3	4	Total
Navy	0	0	0	0	0
Houston	14	14	7	0	35
- Date: December 14, 1980
- Season: 1980
- Stadium: Giants Stadium
- Location: East Rutherford, New Jersey
- MVP: RB Terald Clark (Houston)
- Attendance: 41,417
- Payout: US$400,000

United States TV coverage
- Network: Mizlou Television Network
- Announcers: Bob Murphy, Al DeRogatis, and Howard David

The 1980 Garden State Bowl, part of the 1980 bowl game season, took place on December 14, 1980, at Giants Stadium in East Rutherford, New Jersey. The competing teams were the Navy Midshipmen, which competed as a football independent, and the Houston Cougars, representing the Southwest Conference (SWC). Houston dominated both sides of the ball in their 35–0 shutout of the Midshipmen. This would prove to be Houston's last bowl game win for almost three decades, until the 2008 Armed Forces Bowl, when the Cougars finally snapped an eight-game bowl losing streak.

== Teams ==
=== Houston ===
The 1980 Houston squad finished their regular season 6–5 and tied for second place in the Southwest Conference. The Cougars lost to Arizona State, Miami (FL), Baylor, Texas and Rice. They accepted an invitation to play in the Garden State Bowl against Navy on November 15. The appearance was the first for Houston in the Garden State Bowl and their 10th overall bowl appearance.

=== Navy ===
The 1980 Navy squad finished their regular season 8–3. The Midshipmen lost to Virginia, Air Force and Notre Dame. They accepted an invitation to play in the Garden State Bowl against Houston on November 15 following their victory over Georgia Tech. The appearance was the first for Navy in the Garden State Bowl and their 8th overall bowl appearance.

== Game summary ==
After recovering a Navy fumble on their first drive, Houston scored their first of five rushing touchdowns when Terald Clark ran it in from one-yard out. After Leo Truss blocked a punt, the Cougars drove 43-yards for their second first-quarter touchdown on a one-yard Terry Elston run. Early in the second quarter, Navy had their best scoring opportunity of the afternoon after a Houston turnover. However, Steve Fehr missed a 27-yard field goal and Houston retained their shutout. The Cougars then extended their lead to 28–0 at halftime after touchdown runs of 16 and 26 yards by David Barrett and then Clark. Clark then scored the final points of the game in the third quarter after Clark's third touchdown of the day on a two-yard run. For his 163 yards and three touchdowns, Terald Clark was named the MVP of the game.

Scoring summary

Quarter	Time	Drive			Team	Scoring information	Score	
Quarter	Time	Plays	Yards	TOP	Team	Scoring information	Navy	Houston
1	10:41	8	31		Houston	Terald Clark 1-yard touchdown run, Jeff Shaffer kick good	0	7
1	3:43	10	43		Houston	Terry Elston 1-yard touchdown run, Jeff Shaffer kick good	0	14
2	7:51	7	69		Houston	David Barrett 14-yard touchdown run, Jeff Shaffer kick no good	0	20
2	7:38	1	26		Houston	Terald Clark 26-yard touchdown run, 2-point run good	0	28
3	9:48	13	71		Houston	Terald Clark 2-yard touchdown run, Jeff Shaffer kick good	0	35
"TOP" = time of possession. For other American football terms, see Glossary of American football.							0	35
