= 1980 BYU Cougars football team =

American college football season

1980 BYU Cougars football

WAC champion Holiday Bowl champion

Holiday Bowl, W 46–45 vs. SMU
- Conference: Western Athletic Conference

Ranking
- Coaches: No. 11
- AP: No. 12
- Record: 12–1 (6–1 WAC)
- Head coach: LaVell Edwards (9th season)
- Offensive coordinator: Doug Scovil (4th season)
- Offensive scheme: West Coast
- Defensive coordinator: Fred Whittingham (2nd season)
- Base defense: 4–3
- Home stadium: Cougar Stadium

1980 Western Athletic Conference football standings
	Conf.					Overall
Team	W		L		T	W		L		T
No. 12 BYU $	6	–	1	–	0	12	–	1	–	0
Colorado State	5	–	1	–	1	6	–	4	–	1
Hawaii	3	–	3	–	0	8	–	3	–	0
Wyoming	4	–	4	–	0	6	–	5	–	0
San Diego State	4	–	4	–	0	4	–	8	–	0
New Mexico	3	–	4	–	0	4	–	7	–	0
Utah	2	–	3	–	1	5	–	5	–	1
Air Force	1	–	3	–	0	2	–	9	–	1
UTEP	1	–	6	–	0	1	–	11	–	0
$ – Conference champion; Rankings from AP Poll

The 1980 BYU Cougars football team represented Brigham Young University (BYU) for the 1980 NCAA Division I-A football season. The Cougars were led by ninth-year head coach LaVell Edwards and played their home games at Cougar Stadium in Provo, Utah. The team competed as a member of the Western Athletic Conference, winning their fifth consecutive conference title with a conference record of 6–1. After a season-opening loss to New Mexico, BYU ended on a 12-game winning streak, including a victory over SMU in the 1980 Holiday Bowl, finishing 12–1 overall and ranked 12th in the final AP Poll. The Cougars' offense scored 606 points during the season for an average of 46.6 points per game. They scored over 50 points in a game five times, including two games scoring over 70 points.

== Schedule ==
Date	Opponent	Rank	Site	TV	Result	Attendance	Source
September 6	at New Mexico		University Stadium; Albuquerque, NM		L 21–25	16,840	
September 13	San Diego State		Cougar Stadium; Provo, UT	ABC	W 35–11	36,178	
September 20	at Wisconsin*		Camp Randall Stadium; Madison, WI	KBYU	W 28–3	71,496	
September 27	Long Beach State*		Cougar Stadium; Provo, UT		W 41–25	37,152	
October 11	Wyoming^{†}		Cougar Stadium; Provo, UT		W 52–17	41,296	
October 18	at Utah State*		Romney Stadium; Logan, UT	ABC	W 70–46	23,230	
October 25	at Hawaii	No. 19	Aloha Stadium; Halawa, HI		W 34–7	49,139	
November 1	UTEP	No. 17	Cougar Stadium; Provo, UT		W 83–7	36,251	
November 8	North Texas State*	No. 13	Cougar Stadium; Provo, UT		W 41–23	36,583	
November 15	Colorado State	No. 13	Cougar Stadium; Provo, UT		W 45–14	40,515	
November 22	at Utah	No. 13	Robert Rice Stadium; Salt Lake City, UT		W 56–6	30,520	
November 29	at UNLV*	No. 12	Las Vegas Silver Bowl; Whitney, NV		W 54–14	31,406	
December 19	vs. No. 19 SMU*	No. 14	San Diego Stadium; San Diego, CA (Holiday Bowl)	Mizlou	W 46–45	50,200	
*Non-conference game; ^{†}Homecoming; Rankings from AP Poll released prior to the game

== Game summaries ==
=== San Diego State ===
San Diego St at BYU

Team	1	2	3	4	Total
San Diego St	0	3	0	8	11
• BYU	7	14	14	0	35

- Date: Saturday, September 13
- Location: Cougar Stadium, Provo, Utah
- Game attendance: 36,178
- Source: Palm Beach Post

Scoring summary
1	BYU	Brown 17-yard pass from McMahon (Gunther kick)	BYU 7-0
2	SDSU	Corral 47-yard field goal	BYU 7-3
2	BYU	Phillips 17-yard pass from McMahon (Gunther kick)	BYU 14-3
2	BYU	Davis 15-yard pass from McMahon (Gunther kick)	BYU 21-3
3	BYU	Lacey 12-yard blocked punt return (Gunther kick)	BYU 28-3
3	BYU	Brown 80-yard pass from McMahon (Gunther kick)	BYU 35-3
4	SDSU	Kofler 4-yard run (Corral kick)	BYU 35-11

=== Long Beach State ===
Long Beach State at BYU

Team	1	2	3	4	Total
Long Beach St	0	6	13	6	25
• BYU	21	7	0	13	41

- Date: Saturday, September 28
- Location: Cougar Stadium, Provo, Utah
- Game attendance: 37,152

Scoring summary
1	BYU	Lane 5-yard run (Gunther kick)	BYU 7-0
1	BYU	Jones 20-yard pass from McMahon (Gunther kick)	BYU 14-0
1	BYU	Braga 28-yard pass from McMahon (Gunther kick)	BYU 21-0
2	LBS	Duddridge 25-yard pass from Starkey (run failed)	BYU 21-6
2	BYU	Davis 2-yard pass from McMahon (Gunther kick)	BYU 28-6
3	LBS	Wilson 1-yard run (pass failed)	BYU 28-12
3	LBS	Wilson 1-yard run (Petrosian kick)	BYU 28-19
4	BYU	Lane 1-yard run (Gunther kick)	BYU 35-19
4	BYU	Lane 13-yard pass from McMahon (kick failed)	BYU 41-19
4	LBS	Johnson 12-yard pass from Starkey (pass failed)	BYU 41-25

- BYU: Jim McMahon 339 Yds passing

=== Wyoming ===
Wyoming came into the contest with a wishbone attack that was fourth in the nation in rushing and sixth in total offense at 450 yards per game while BYU featured the nation's second best passing squad behind Jim McMahon, the best statistical passer in the country.

McMahon finished 22 of 31 for 408 yards and four touchdowns, his fourth straight game over 300 yards to keep his number one ranking. Wyoming attempted to rush seven and eight at McMahon but the offensive line and backs, normally featured in the passing game, did a superb job blocking. McMahon was never sacked as Nick Eyre, Lloyd Eldredge, Bart Oates, Calvin Close and Ray Linford dominated the line of scrimmage for the Cougars.

With the Cowboys committing to the pass rush, McMahon threw at will to targets Dan Plater (8 receptions for 99 yards and a touchdown), Lloyd Jones (5/120, TD), Bill Davis (7/143, TD) and Clay Brown (2/61, TD), who faced one-on-one coverage and exploit this advantage.

Meanwhile, BYU's defense was also strong, consistently getting into the Wyoming backfield and limiting the wishbone options for a team that came in averaging 323 yards on the ground. With the defensive line of Glen Titensor, Mike Morgan, Chuck Ehin, Pulusila Filiaga and Brad Anae shutting down the run, all the likes of Glen Redd, Kyle Whittingham, Bob Prested and Ed St. Pierre had to do was clean up.

The game was decided in the first quarter as BYU scored on two of its first three possessions and Wyoming gained 30 yards rushing in four. By halftime, BYU led 17-3 and the Cowboys had only increased their rushing total to 42.

"I've never seen a team compare with BYU throwing the football and I don't believe we've seen anyone physically as tough. BYU is much stronger than we are", Wyoming head coach Pat Dye said.

Dye continued, "McMahon is a great quarterback. We knew the four-man rush wouldn't get to them, so we tried different things. Today, a four-man rush or a seven-man rush didn't make any difference."

=== At Utah ===
#13 BYU Cougars (9–1) at Utah Utes (6–2–1)

Quarter	1	2	3	4	Total
BYU	7	14	21	14	56
Utah	0	0	0	6	6

at Rice Stadium, Salt Lake City, Utah

- Date: November 22, 1980
- Game weather: Light rain, 42 °F (6 °C)
- Game attendance: 30,520
- Box Score

Game information

First quarter

- BYU – Eric Lane 1-yard run (Kurt Gunther kick). BYU 7–0.

Second quarter

- BYU – Jim McMahon 7-yard run (Kurt Gunther kick). BYU 14–0.
- BYU – Clay Brown 5-yard pass from Jim McMahon (Kurt Gunther kick), 1:47. BYU 21–0.

Third quarter

- BYU – Eric Lane 11-yard pass from Jim McMahon (Kurt Gunther kick). BYU 28–0.
- BYU – Eric Lane 1-yard run (Kurt Gunther kick). BYU 35–0.
- BYU – Clay Brown 76-yard pass from Jim McMahon (Kurt Gunther kick). BYU 42–0.

Fourth quarter

- UTAH – Hilria Johnson 1-yard run (pass failed). BYU 42–6.
- BYU – Steve Carlsen 1-yard run (Kurt Gunther kick). BYU 49–6.
- BYU – Scott Pettis 5-yard run (Kurt Gunther kick). BYU 56–6.

Top passers

- BYU – Jim McMahon – 21/34, 399 yards, 3 TD, INT
- UTAH – Ricky Hardin – 19/31, 258 yards, 2 INT

Top rushers

- BYU – Scott Pettis – 4 rushes, 81 yards, TD
- UTAH – Tony Lindsay – 22 rushes, 93 yards

Top receivers

- BYU – Clay Brown – 5 receptions, 184 yards, 2 TD
- UTAH – James Teahan – 7 receptions, 92 yards

BYU clinched its third straight Holiday Bowl berth and its fifth straight Western Athletic Conference title with the victory over their in-state rivals. Jim McMahon completed 21 of 34 passes for 399 yards, an NCAA record tenth straight game over 300 yards passing. McMahon also broke San Diego State's Dennis Shaw's 1969 single-season touchdown pass record of 39 with his first scoring toss and later surpassed Shaw for most total touchdowns in a single season (45).

External videos
- 1980 BYU at Utah – Highlights

=== Holiday Bowl ===
Holiday Bowl
SMU vs. BYU

Team	1	2	3	4	Total
SMU	19	10	9	7	45
• BYU	7	6	6	27	46

- Date: December 19
- Location: Jack Murphy Stadium, San Diego, California
- Game attendance: 50,200

Scoring summary
1		SMU	Eric Dickerson 15-yard run (Eddie Garcia kick)	SMU 7-0
1		SMU	Craig James 45-yard run (Eddie Garcia kick)	SMU 14-0
1		SMU	Safety, centered out of end zone	SMU 16-0
1		SMU	Eddie Garcia 42-yard field goal	SMU 19-0
1		BYU	Clay Brown 64-yard pass from Jim McMahon (Kurt Gunther kick)	SMU 19-7
2		SMU	Craig James 3-yard pass from Lance McIlhenny (Eddie Garcia kick)	SMU 26-7
2		SMU	Eddie Garcia 44-yard field goal	SMU 29-7
2		BYU	Vai Sikahema 83-yard punt return (pass failed)	SMU 29-13
3		SMU	Eric Dickerson 1-yard run (pass failed)	SMU 35-13
3		BYU	Clay Brown 13-yard pass from Jim McMahon (pass failed)	SMU 35-19
3		SMU	Eddie Garcia 42-yard field goal	SMU 38-19
4		BYU	Scott Phillips 1-yard run (pass failed)	SMU 38-25
4		SMU	Craig James 42-yard run (Eddie Garcia kick)	SMU 45-25
4		BYU	Matt Braga 15-yard pass from Jim McMahon (pass failed)	SMU 45-31
4		BYU	Scott Phillips 1-yard run (Scott Phillips pass from Jim McMahon)	SMU 45-39
4	:00	BYU	Clay Brown 41-yard pass from Jim McMahon (Kurt Gunther kick)	BYU 46-45

== Personnel ==
1980 BYU Cougars football team roster
Players
Coaches
Offense

Pos.	#	Name	Class
G, C	57	Robert Anae	Fr
TE	85	Clay Brown	Sr
WR	88	Bill Davis	Sr
OT	72	Nick Eyre	Sr
RB	2	Bruce Hansen	Fr
TE	95	Gordon Hudson	Fr
RB	36	Eric Lane	Sr
C	52	Trevor Matich	So
QB	9	Jim McMahon	RJr
C	50	Bart Oates	So
OT	64	Andy Reid	Sr
RB	23	Vai Sikahema	Fr
QB	8	Steve Young	Fr

Defense

Pos.	#	Name	Class
DE	93	Brad Anae	Jr
DT	78	Chuck Ehin	So
DB	46	Tom Holmoe	So
DT	66	Doug Kellermeyer	Fr
DE	77	Mike Morgan	So
LB	41	Glen Redd	Sr
LB	47	Todd Shell	Fr
LB	59	Kyle Whittingham	Jr

Special teams

Pos.	#	Name	Class
K	10	Lee Johnson	Fr

Head coach

- LaVell Edwards

Coordinators/assistant coaches

- Norm Chow (WR)
- Dick Felt (DB)
- Roger French (OL)
- Garth Hall (RB)
- Mel Olsen (JV)
- Tom Ramage (DL)
- Doug Scovil (OC/QB)
- Fred Whittingham (LB)

Legend

- (C) Team captain
- (S) Suspended
- (I) Ineligible
- Injured
- Redshirt

Roster
