= Holiday Bowl =

Annual college football bowl game

- Stadium: Snapdragon Stadium
- Location: San Diego, California
- Previous stadiums: San Diego Stadium (1978–2019); Petco Park (2021–2023)
- Operated: 1978–present
- Conference tie-ins: Pac-12 (1998–present); ACC (2022–present)
- Previous conference tie-ins: WAC (1978–1997); Big 12 (1995–2013); Big Ten (1991–1994; 2014–2020)
- Payout: US$6,532,700 (2019)
- Website: holidaybowl.com

Sponsors
- SeaWorld (1986–1990); Thrifty Car Rental (1991–1994); Plymouth (1995–1997); Culligan (1998–2001); Pacific Life Insurance Company (2002–2009); Bridgepoint Education (2010–2012); National University (2013–2014); National Funding (2015–2016); San Diego County Credit Union (2017–2019, 2022); DirecTV (2023–2024); Trust & Will (2025)

Former names
- Holiday Bowl (1978–1985); Sea World Holiday Bowl (1986–1990); Thrifty Car Rental Holiday Bowl (1991–1994); Plymouth Holiday Bowl (1995–1997); Culligan Holiday Bowl (1998–2001); Pacific Life Holiday Bowl (2002–2009); Bridgepoint Education Holiday Bowl (2010–2012); National University Holiday Bowl (2013–2014); National Funding Holiday Bowl (2015–2016); San Diego County Credit Union Holiday Bowl (2017–2022); DirecTV Holiday Bowl (2023–2024); Trust & Will Holiday Bowl (2025)

2025 season matchup
- Arizona vs. SMU (SMU 24–19)

The Holiday Bowl is an annual college football bowl game held in San Diego, California. Operating since 1978, its current conference tie-ins are with the Pac-12 Conference and the Atlantic Coast Conference (ACC). The bowl is held at Snapdragon Stadium; it was played at San Diego Stadium from 1978 to 2019 and at Petco Park from 2021 to 2023.

Historically, the Holiday Bowl had a long-standing tie-in with the Western Athletic Conference (WAC). During this period, the bowl hosted the game that clinched the national championship for the BYU Cougars in 1984, one of only two times a non-New Year's Six bowl game has done this. (Note: See also the 1991 Florida Citrus Bowl.) The bowl also previously had tie-ins with the Big 12 Conference and the Big Ten Conference.

== History ==
The Holiday Bowl was founded in 1978 to give the Western Athletic Conference an automatic bowl bid after the Fiesta Bowl, which previously had a tie-in with the conference, ended its association with the WAC following the departure of Arizona and Arizona State (the latter of which served as the game's host) to join the Pacific-8 Conference in the summer of 1978, leading to the conference renaming itself as the Pacific-10. The Holiday Bowl inherited the Fiesta Bowl's former WAC ties and gave the conference's champion its automatic bid. For the first several editions, the WAC champion played an at-large team; from 1991 through 1994, the Big Ten Conference was given the second bid, provided it had enough bowl-eligible teams.

Beginning in 1995, the Big Eight Conference replaced the Big Ten and remained tied with the bowl as the conference expanded to become the Big 12 the following year. The WAC's automatic bid was split, with first choice given to the Cotton Bowl Classic in Dallas, and a team from the Pacific-10 was added as the alternate pick (meaning that, if the WAC champion played in the Cotton Bowl, a Pacific-10 team would play in the Holiday Bowl). The WAC ended its association with the Holiday Bowl after 1997, and the game became a matchup between the Big 12 and Pacific-10.

From 1998 to 2009, the matchup featured the No. 2 team in the Pacific-10/Pac-12 and the No. 3 Big 12 team, but the Alamo Bowl outbid the Holiday Bowl to feature that matchup beginning in 2010. Holiday Bowl Executive Director Bruce Binkowski stated that average ticket prices for the Holiday Bowl would have had to be increased from $60 to $100 to match the Alamo Bowl's offer of a $3 million payout (the Holiday Bowl was only offering $2.35 million). The Pac-12 and Big 12 retained their contracts with the Holiday Bowl, however, and the 2010–2013 matchups pitted the No. 3 Pac-12 team against the No. 5 Big 12 team.

Starting with the 2014 game, the Big Ten signed a six-year contract to return after a 20-year absence to the Holiday Bowl, regaining the slot that it had held from 1991 to 1994. With this agreement, the Holiday Bowl featured the No. 3 Pac-12 team and the No. 4 Big Ten team. In 2019, the bowl announced plans to host a Pac-12 team and an Atlantic Coast Conference (ACC) team during the 2020-2025 games.

Through 2019, the bowl was played at San Diego Stadium. The stadium was demolished beginning in the autumn of 2020, at which point the game was played at Petco Park. In 2024, the bowl returned to Mission Valley playing in Snapdragon Stadium, built on the site of San Diego Stadium.

On October 22, 2020, organizers canceled the 2020 edition of the bowl, citing complications from the COVID-19 pandemic. The 2021 edition was called off hours before kickoff on December 28, due to COVID-19 protocol issues within the UCLA program, and officially canceled the next morning, after organizers could not secure a replacement team to face NC State. In May 2023, organizers of the Holiday Bowl filed a lawsuit in San Diego County, seeking $3 million in damages from the Pac-12 and UCLA due to their withdrawal from the 2021 game. Organizers also stated that since reimbursement was not provided for cancellation of the 2021 game, the bowl withheld a $3.2 million payment to Pac-12 member Oregon for the 2022 game.

In 2025, Holiday Bowl organizers considered moving the game from San Diego to Jeddah, Saudi Arabia. The bowl's organizing committee met with Saudi officials in the spring of that year regarding the move and discussions about the proposal were communicated to the ACC, but the conference's athletic directors rejected it. The game itself was scheduled for January 2, 2026, still held in San Diego. It will be the first time the Holiday Bowl is played in the month of January. If the Saudi Arabia proposal had been approved, the 2025 Holiday Bowl would have been the first NCAA sanctioned bowl game held outside of North America.

Sponsors of the bowl game have included in order: SeaWorld; Thrifty Car Rental; Chrysler Corporation (through its Plymouth brand); Culligan; Pacific Life; Bridgepoint Education; National University; National Funding, a San Diego–based alternative lender; San Diego County Credit Union, which formerly sponsored San Diego's other bowl game, the now-defunct Poinsettia Bowl; and DirecTV. In December 2025, Trust & Will was announced as the sponsor for the January 2026 game.

== Notable games ==
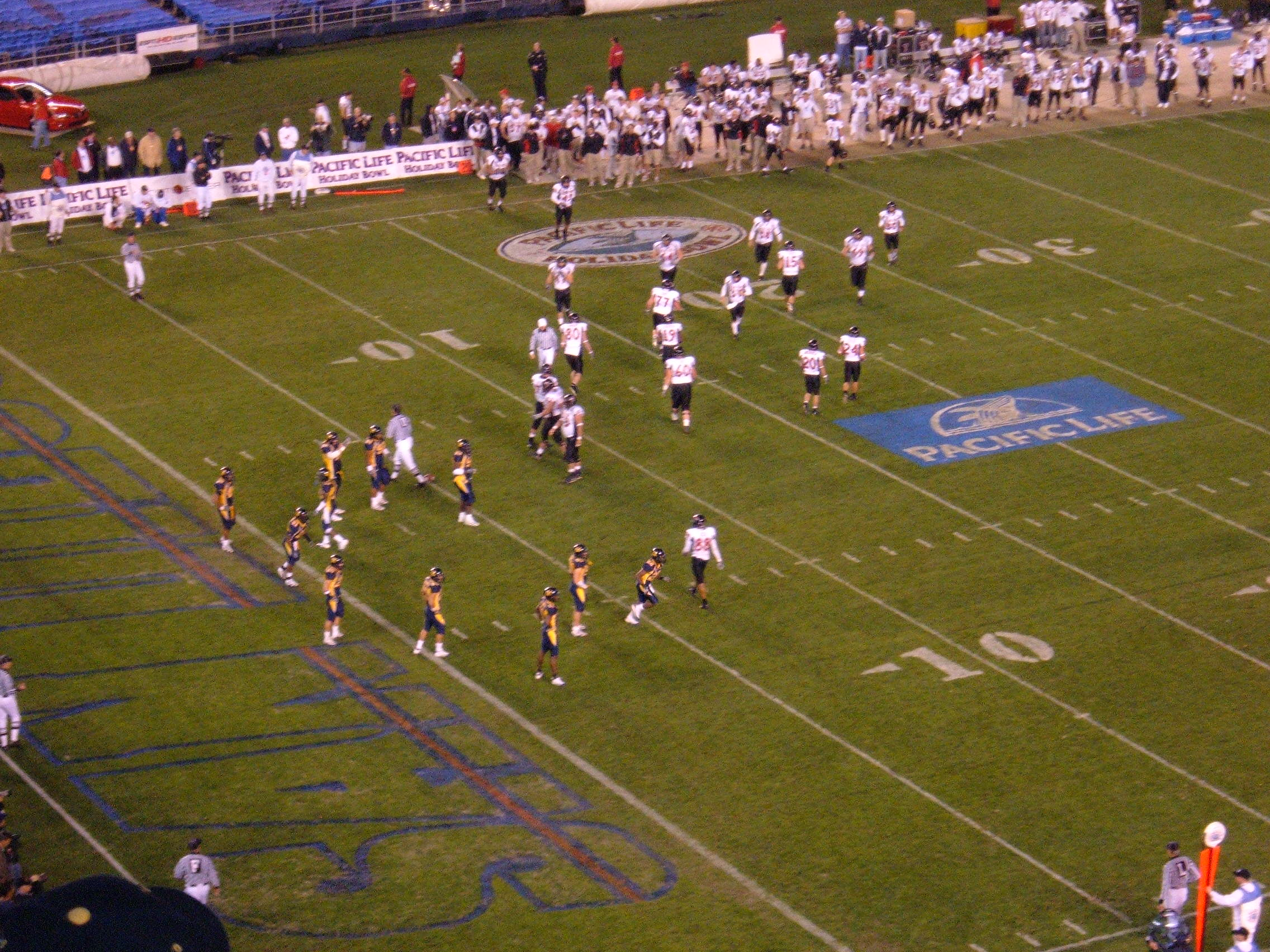
Cal vs. Texas Tech at the 2004 Holiday Bowl

For the first seven games, Brigham Young University represented the WAC as its champion. In the inaugural 1978 game, the Navy Midshipmen came in with an 8–3 record and a Commander-in-Chief's Trophy and then capped their season with a 23–16 comeback victory over the highly favored Cougars. BYU has played in a total of 11 Holiday Bowls, more than any other team.

The 1980 game became known as "The Miracle Bowl" after BYU overcame a 20-point Southern Methodist University lead with less than three minutes remaining in the game. BYU tied the score as time expired, via a 60-yard Hail Mary pass from All-American quarterback Jim McMahon to tight end Clay Brown. BYU kicker Kurt Gunther added the game-winning extra point.

The 1983 game between BYU and Missouri had its own dramatic ending, as BYU rallied behind All-American quarterback Steve Young. With just 23 seconds left, Young gave a handoff to Eddie Stinnett. Stinnett then turned around and passed it back to Steve Young, who caught it and ran in for a touchdown, giving BYU a 21–17 win. Young achieved a rare feat in college football: one touchdown pass, one touchdown run, and one touchdown reception all in a single game. For his efforts, he was named offensive MVP.

In the 1984 edition, BYU secured the national championship by defeating the Michigan Wolverines, 24–17. Because of the WAC's contract with the Holiday Bowl, BYU, top-ranked and the only undefeated team in Division I-A going into that season's bowls, was obligated to play in the mid-tier Holiday Bowl against a mediocre (6–5) Michigan squad. Again, the Holiday Bowl came down to the final few plays. BYU drove the length of the field and scored on a pass from injured All-American quarterback Robbie Bosco to Kelly Smith with 1:23 remaining. Marv Allen, who had played in the very first Holiday Bowl as a redshirt freshman in 1978, sealed the victory with an interception. This game marks a rare example of a non-New Year's Six bowl game featuring a team later named national champion.

== Game results ==
Rankings are based on the AP poll prior to the game being played.

Date Played	Winning team		Losing team		Attnd.	Notes
December 22, 1978	Navy	23	BYU	16	52,500	notes
December 21, 1979	Indiana	38	#9 BYU	37	52,500	notes
December 19, 1980	#14 BYU	46	#19 SMU	45	50,200	notes
December 18, 1981	#14 BYU	38	#20 Washington State	36	52,419	notes
December 17, 1982	#17 Ohio State	47	BYU	17	52,533	notes
December 23, 1983	#9 BYU	21	Missouri	17	51,480	notes
December 21, 1984	#1 BYU	24	Michigan	17	61,243	notes
December 22, 1985	#14 Arkansas	18	Arizona State	17	60,641	notes
December 30, 1986	#19 Iowa	39	San Diego State	38	59,473	notes
December 30, 1987	#18 Iowa	20	Wyoming	19	61,892	notes
December 30, 1988	#12 Oklahoma State	62	#15 Wyoming	14	60,641	notes
December 29, 1989	#18 Penn State	50	#19 BYU	39	61,113	notes
December 29, 1990	Texas A&M	65	#13 BYU	14	61,441	notes
December 30, 1991	BYU	13	#7 Iowa	13	60,646	notes
December 30, 1992	Hawaii	27	Illinois	17	44,457	notes
December 30, 1993	#11 Ohio State	28	BYU	21	52,108	notes
December 30, 1994	#20 Michigan	24	#10 Colorado State	14	59,453	notes
December 29, 1995	#10 Kansas State	54	Colorado State	21	51,051	notes
December 30, 1996	#8 Colorado	33	#13 Washington	21	54,749	notes
December 29, 1997	#18 Colorado State	35	#19 Missouri	24	50,761	notes
December 30, 1998	#5 Arizona	23	#14 Nebraska	20	65,354	notes
December 29, 1999	#7 Kansas State	24	Washington	20	57,118	notes
December 29, 2000	#8 Oregon	35	#12 Texas	30	63,278	notes
December 28, 2001	#9 Texas	47	#21 Washington	43	60,548	notes
December 27, 2002	#6 Kansas State	34	Arizona State	27	58,717	notes
December 30, 2003	#15 Washington State	28	#5 Texas	20	61,102	notes
December 30, 2004	#23 Texas Tech	45	#4 California	31	63,711	notes
December 29, 2005	Oklahoma	17	#6 Oregon	14	65,416	notes
December 28, 2006	#20 California	45	#21 Texas A&M	10	62,395	notes
December 27, 2007	#17 Texas	52	#12 Arizona State	34	64,020	notes
December 30, 2008	#15 Oregon	42	#13 Oklahoma State	31	59,106	notes
December 30, 2009	#20 Nebraska	33	#22 Arizona	0	64,607	notes
December 30, 2010	Washington	19	#17 Nebraska	7	57,921	notes
December 28, 2011	Texas	21	California	10	56,313	notes
December 27, 2012	Baylor	49	#17 UCLA	26	55,507	notes
December 30, 2013	Texas Tech	37	#16 Arizona State	23	52,930	notes
December 27, 2014	#24 USC	45	#25 Nebraska	42	55,789	notes
December 30, 2015	#23 Wisconsin	23	USC	21	48,329	notes
December 27, 2016	Minnesota	17	Washington State	12	48,704	notes
December 28, 2017	#19 Michigan State	42	#21 Washington State	17	47,092	notes
December 31, 2018	Northwestern	31	#20 Utah	20	47,007	notes
December 27, 2019	#19 Iowa	49	#22 USC	24	50,123	notes
December 2020	Canceled due to the COVID-19 pandemic				—N/a	
December 28, 2021	#18 NC State	1	UCLA	0	—N/a	‡
December 28, 2022	#15 Oregon	28	North Carolina	27	36,242	notes
December 27, 2023	USC	42	#16 Louisville	28	35,317	notes
December 27, 2024	#22 Syracuse	52	Washington State	35	23,920	notes
January 2, 2026	SMU	24	#21 Arizona	19	30,602	notes

‡ The NCAA ruled the 2021 edition a no contest after UCLA withdrew hours before the game was to start. Holiday Bowl officials awarded NC State the game trophy. By rule of both participating conferences in 2021, NC State won by forfeit, which the school claims as a win. Further litigation was pressed by game organizers against the Pac-12 in 2023.

== MVPs ==
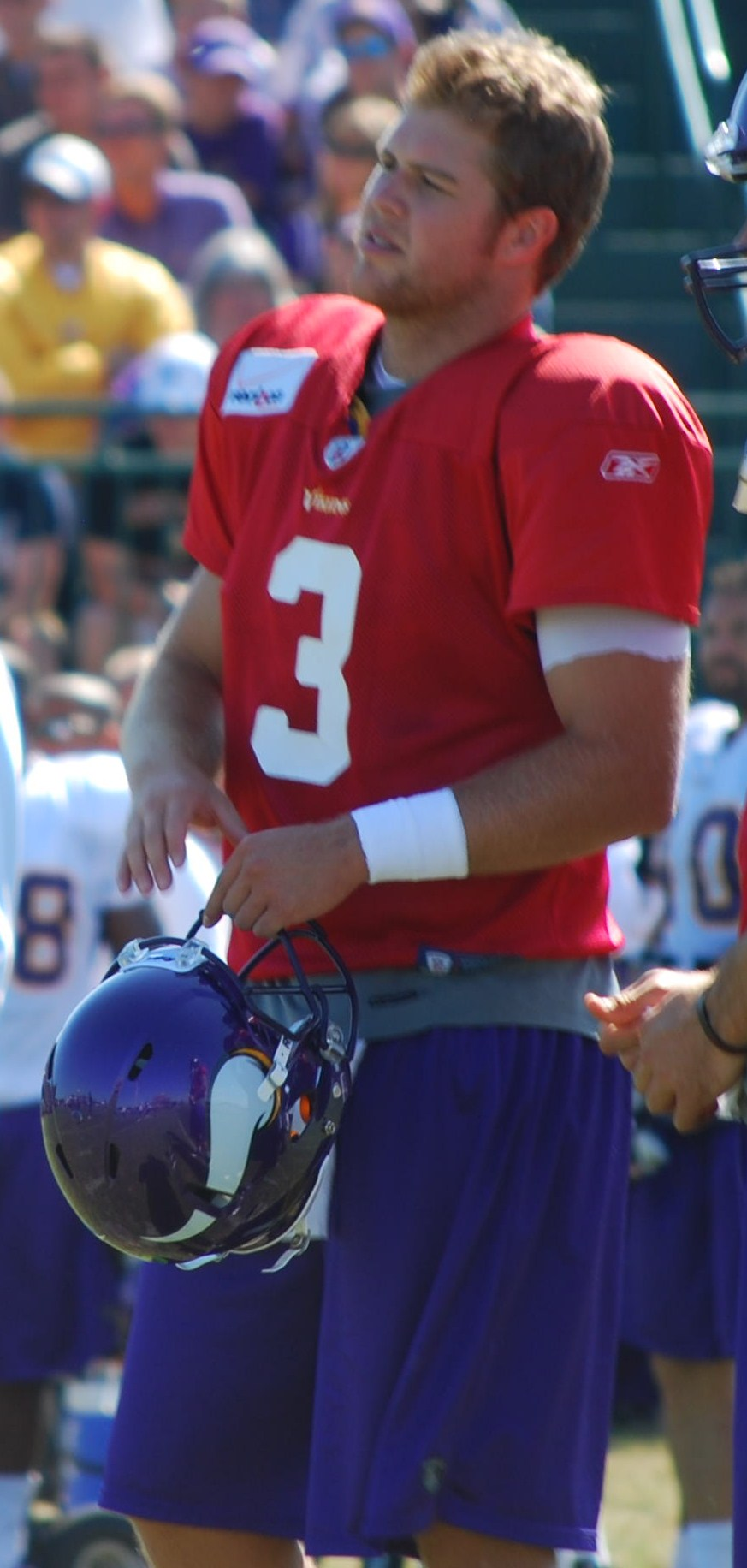
2005 offensive MVP Rhett Bomar

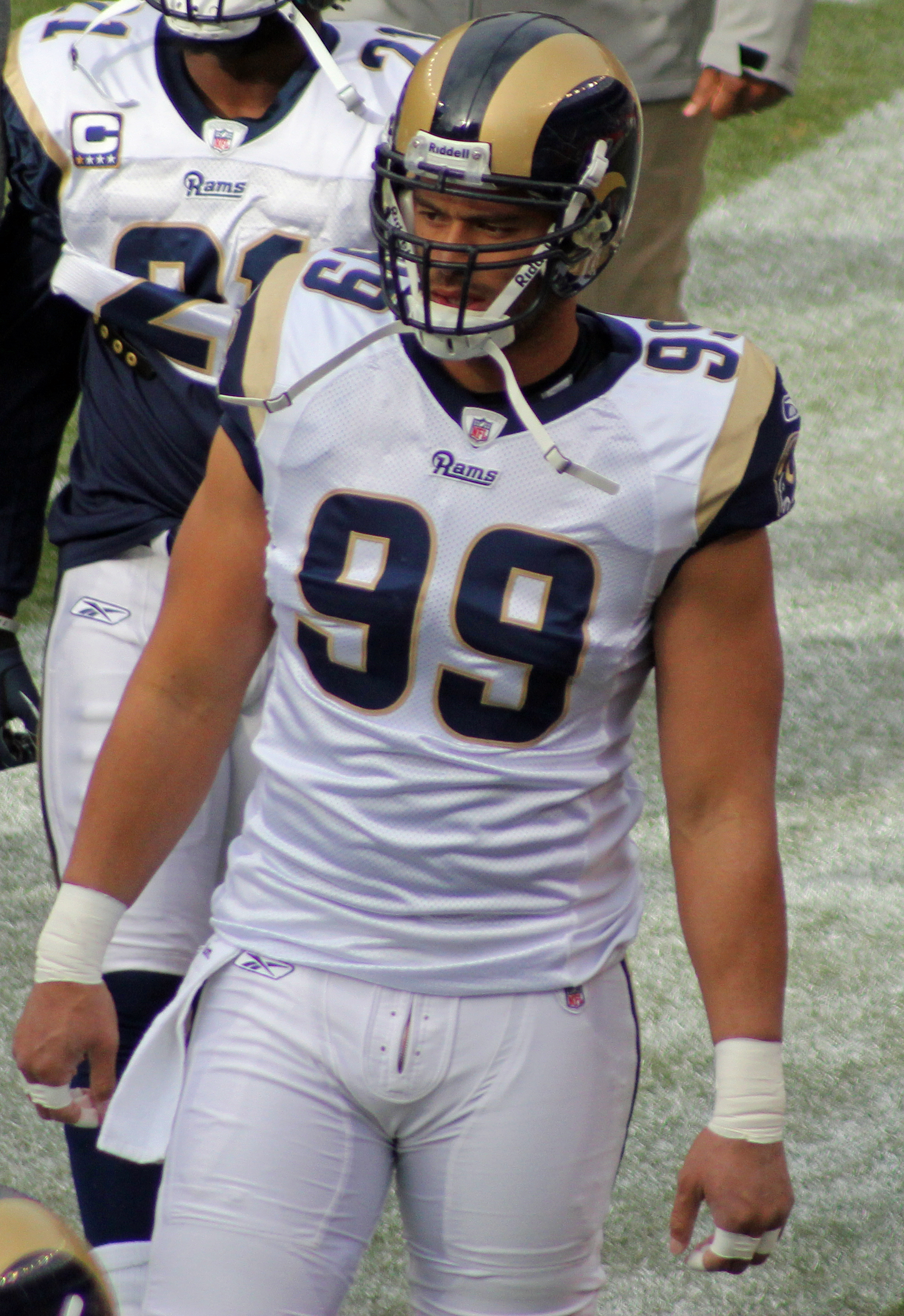
2005 defensive co-MVP C. J. Ah You

The bowl names offensive and defensive MVPs; in some instances, co-MVPs have been named, or two offensive MVPs in lieu of a defensive MVP.

Game	Offensive MVP			Defensive MVP		
Game	Player	Team	Pos.	Player	Team	Pos.
1978	Phil McConkey	Navy	WR	Tom Enlow	BYU	LB
1979	Marc Wilson	BYU	QB	Tim Wilbur	Indiana	CB
1980	Jim McMahon; Craig James	BYU; SMU	QB; RB			
1981	Jim McMahon	BYU	QB	Kyle Whittingham	BYU	LB
1982	Tim Spencer	Ohio State	RB	Garcia Lane	Ohio State	CB
1983	Steve Young	BYU	QB	Bobby Bell	Missouri	DE
1984	Robbie Bosco	BYU	QB	Leon White	BYU	LB
1985	Bobby Joe Edmonds	Arkansas	RB	Greg Battle	Arizona State	LB
1986	Mark Vlasic; Todd Santos	Iowa; San Diego State	QB; QB	Richard Brown	San Diego State	LB
1987	Craig Burnett	Wyoming	QB	Anthony Wright	Iowa	CB
1988	Barry Sanders	Oklahoma State	RB	Sim Drain	Oklahoma State	LB
1989	Blair Thomas; Ty Detmer	Penn State; BYU	RB; QB			
1990	Bucky Richardson	Texas A&M	QB	William Thomas	Texas A&M	LB
1991	Ty Detmer	BYU	QB	Josh Arnold; Carlos James	BYU; Iowa	DB; DB
1992	Michael Carter	Hawaii	QB	Junior Tagoai	Hawaii	DT
1993	Raymont Harris; John Walsh	Ohio State; BYU	RB; QB	Lorenzo Styles	Ohio State	LB
1994	Todd Collins; Anthoney Hill	Michigan; Colorado State	QB; QB	Matt Dyson	Michigan	LB
1995	Brian Kavanagh	Kansas State	QB	Mario Smith	Kansas State	DB
1996	Koy Detmer	Colorado	QB	Nick Ziegler	Colorado	DE
1997	Moses Moreno; Darran Hall	Colorado State; Colorado State	QB; WR			
1998	Keith Smith	Arizona	QB	Mike Rucker	Nebraska	DE
1999	Jonathan Beasley	Kansas State	QB	Darren Howard	Kansas State	DE
2000	Joey Harrington	Oregon	QB	Rashad Bauman	Oregon	DB
2001	Major Applewhite; Willie Hurst	Texas; Washington	QB; RB	Derrick Johnson	Texas	LB
2002	Ell Roberson	Kansas State	QB	Terrell Suggs	Arizona State	DE
2003	Sammy Moore	Washington State	WR	Kyle Basler	Washington State	P
2004	Sonny Cumbie	Texas Tech	QB	Vincent Meeks	Texas Tech	DB
2005	Rhett Bomar	Oklahoma	QB	C. J. Ah You; Anthony Trucks	Oklahoma; Oregon	DE; DB
2006	Marshawn Lynch; Nate Longshore	California; California	RB; QB	Desmond Bishop	California	LB
2007	Colt McCoy	Texas	QB	Brian Orakpo	Texas	DE
2008	Jeremiah Masoli	Oregon	QB	Jairus Byrd	Oregon	DB
2009	Niles Paul	Nebraska	WR	Matt O'Hanlon	Nebraska	DB
2010	Chris Polk	Washington	RB	Mason Foster	Washington	LB
2011	David Ash	Texas	QB	Keenan Robinson	Texas	LB
2012	Lache Seastrunk	Baylor	RB	Chris McAllister	Baylor	DE
2013	Davis Webb	Texas Tech	QB	Will Smith	Texas Tech	LB
2014	Cody Kessler	USC	QB	Leonard Williams	USC	DE
2015	Joel Stave	Wisconsin	QB	Jack Cichy	Wisconsin	LB
2016	Rodney Smith	Minnesota	RB	Blake Cashman	Minnesota	LB
2017	Brian Lewerke	Michigan State	QB	Chris Frey Jr.	Michigan State	LB
2018	Clayton Thorson	Northwestern	QB	JR Pace	Northwestern	S
2019	Ihmir Smith-Marsette	Iowa	WR	A. J. Epenesa	Iowa	DE
2022	Bucky Irving	Oregon	RB	Mase Funa	Oregon	LB
2023	Miller Moss	USC	QB	Jaylin Smith	USC	S
2024	Kyle McCord	Syracuse	QB	Alijah Clark	Syracuse	DB
2026	Yamir Knight	SMU	WR	Ahmaad Moses	SMU	S

== Most appearances ==
Updated through the January 2026 edition (46 games, 92 total appearances).

Teams with multiple appearances

Rank	Team	Appearances	Record	Win pct.
1	BYU	11	4–6–1	.409
2	Texas	5	3–2	.600
2	Washington State	5	1–4	.200
3	Iowa	4	3–0–1	.875
3	Oregon	4	3–1	.750
3	USC	4	2–2	.500
3	Washington	4	1–3	.250
3	Nebraska	4	1–3	.250
3	Arizona State	4	0–4	.000

Rank	Team	Appearances	Record	Win pct.
10	Kansas State	3	3–0	1.000
10	Arizona	3	1–2	.333
10	California	3	1–2	.333
10	Colorado State	3	1–2	.333
14	Ohio State	2	2–0	1.000
14	Texas Tech	2	2–0	1.000
14	Michigan	2	1–1	.500
14	Oklahoma State	2	1–1	.500
14	Texas A&M	2	1–1	.500
14	SMU	2	1–1	.500
14	Missouri	2	0–2	.000
14	Wyoming	2	0–2	.000

Teams with a single appearance

Won (13): Arkansas, Baylor, Colorado, Hawaii, Indiana, Michigan State, Minnesota, Navy, Northwestern, Oklahoma, Penn State, Syracuse, Wisconsin
Lost (6): Illinois, Louisville, North Carolina, San Diego State, UCLA, Utah

Notes:

- The 2021 edition was ruled a no contest by the NCAA and is not included in this section, although conference rules for both participating conferences would have declared the game a forfeit win for North Carolina State and loss
- Every legacy Pac-12 legacy school except Stanford and Oregon State had appeared in the game (Colorado appeared during their first stint in the Big 12). The only current or former Big 12 members that have not played in the bowl are Cincinnati, Houston, Iowa State, Kansas, TCU, UCF and West Virginia.

== Appearances by conference ==
Updated through the January 2026 edition (46 games, 92 total appearances).

Conference	Record					Appearances by season		
Conference	Games	W	L	T	Win pct.	Won	Lost	Tied
Pac-12	28	9	19	0	.321	1998, 2000, 2003, 2006, 2008, 2010, 2014, 2022, 2023	1981, 1985, 1996, 1999, 2001, 2002, 2004, 2005, 2007, 2009, 2011, 2012, 2013, 2015, 2016, 2017, 2018, 2019, 2024	
Big 12	19	11	8	0	.579	1996, 1999, 2001, 2002, 2004, 2005, 2007, 2009, 2011, 2012, 2013	1997, 1998, 2000, 2003, 2006, 2008, 2010, 2025*	
WAC	18	6	11	1	.361	1980, 1981, 1983, 1984, 1992, 1997	1978, 1979, 1982, 1986, 1987, 1988, 1989, 1990, 1993, 1994, 1995	1991
Big Ten	15	11	3	1	.767	1979, 1982, 1986, 1987, 1993, 1994, 2015, 2016, 2017, 2018, 2019	1984, 1992, 2014	1991
ACC	4	2	2	0	.500	2024, 2025*	2022, 2023	
Big Eight	3	2	1	0	.667	1988, 1995	1983	
SWC	3	2	1	0	.667	1985, 1990	1980	
Independents	2	2	0	0	1.000	1978, 1989		

Notes:

- Games marked with an asterisk (*) were played in January of the following calendar year.
- The 2021 edition was ruled a no contest by the NCAA and is not included in this section.
- The Pac-12's record includes appearances when the conference was known as the Pac-10 (before 2011).
- Conferences that are defunct or no longer active in FBS are marked in italics.
- Independent appearances: Navy (1978), Penn State (1989)

== Game records ==
Team	Record, Team vs. Opponent	Year
Most points scored (one team)	65, Texas A&M vs. BYU	1990
Most points scored (losing team)	45, SMU vs. BYU	1980
Most points scored (both teams)	91, BYU vs. SMU	1980
Fewest points allowed	0, Nebraska vs. Arizona	2009
Largest margin of victory	51, Texas A&M vs. BYU	1990
Total yards	698, Oklahoma State vs. Wyoming	1988
Rushing yards	393, SMU vs. BYU	1980
Passing yards	576, BYU vs. Penn State	1989
First downs	35, BYU vs. Penn State	1989
Fewest yards allowed	109, Nebraska vs. Arizona	2009
Fewest rushing yards allowed	–12, Texas A&M vs. BYU	1990
Fewest passing yards allowed	46, Nebraska vs. Arizona	2009
Individual	Record, Player, Team vs. Opponent	Year
All-purpose yards		
Touchdowns (all-purpose)	5, Barry Sanders, Oklahoma State vs. Wyoming	1988
Rushing yards	235, Raymont Harris, Ohio State vs. BYU	1993
Rushing touchdowns	5, Barry Sanders, Oklahoma State vs. Wyoming	1988
Passing yards	576, Ty Detmer, BYU vs. Penn State	1989
Passing touchdowns	6, Miller Moss, USC vs Louisville	2023
Receptions		
Receiving yards	172, Kyle Williams, Washington State vs. Syracuse	2024
Receiving touchdowns	3, Clay Brown, BYU vs. SMU	1980
Tackles	18 (total), Garland Rivers, Michigan vs. BYU; 17 (solo), same	1984
Sacks	4, Bobby Bell, Missouri vs. BYU	1983
Interceptions	2, by several players—most recent: Brandon Foster, Texas vs. Arizona State	2007
Long Plays	Record, Player, Team vs. Opponent	Year
Touchdown run	76, Jeremiah Johnson, Oregon vs. Oklahoma State	2008
Touchdown pass	76, Koy Detmer to Rae Carruth, Colorado vs. Washington	1996
Kickoff return	98, shared by: Adoree' Jackson, USC vs. Nebraska; Ihmir Smith-Marsette, Iowa vs. USC	2014; 2019
Punt return	85, Darran Hall, Colorado State vs. Missouri	1997
Interception return	48, Vincent Meeks, Texas Tech vs. California	2004
Fumble return	82, Jared McGee, Northwestern vs. Utah	2018
Punt	64, shared by: Justin Tucker, Texas vs. California; Sam Foltz, Nebraska vs. USC	2011; 2014
Field goal	51, Ray Tarasi, Penn State vs. BYU	1989

== Media coverage ==
The bowl was previously broadcast by Mizlou (1978–1984), Lorimar (1985), ESPN (1986–2016), FS1 (2017–2019), and Fox (2022–2025), with Fox not carrying its first Holiday Bowl until the 2022 edition, due to the 2020 and 2021 cancellations. The CW was named the bowl's official broadcast partner starting with the 2026 edition.

== See also ==
- Coronado Speed Festival – Vintage car racing festival created to raise funds for the bowl
