= Garden State Bowl =

Former annual American football game

Garden State Bowl (defunct)
- Stadium: Giants Stadium
- Location: East Rutherford, New Jersey
- Operated: 1978–1981

The Garden State Bowl was an annual post-season college football bowl game played at Giants Stadium in East Rutherford, New Jersey, from 1978 until 1981. Freezing temperatures each year at the game, together with a lack of successful local college teams, contributed to its rapid demise.

== Game results ==
Date	Winner		Loser		Notes	Source
December 16, 1978	Arizona State	34	Rutgers	18	Notes	
December 15, 1979	No. 20 Temple	28	California	17	Notes	
December 14, 1980	Houston	35	Navy	0	Notes	
December 13, 1981	Tennessee	28	Wisconsin	21	Notes	

== Broadcasters ==
=== Television ===
Date	Network	Play-by-play	Color commentator(s)	Sideline reporter(s)
December 16, 1978	Mizlou	Merle Harmon	Al DeRogatis	Howard David
December 15, 1979	Mizlou	Merle Harmon	Al DeRogatis	Howard David
December 14, 1980	Mizlou	Bob Murphy	Al DeRogatis	Howard David
December 13, 1981	Mizlou	Ray Scott	Al DeRogatis	Pat Scanlon

== Effects ==
After the demise of the Garden State Bowl following the 1981 game, the New Jersey Sports and Exposition Authority, which operated and scheduled events at Giants Stadium, decided to host a game in the beginning of the season, rather than the end. This led to the formation of the Kickoff Classic, which was held either the last week of August or the first week of September every year for 20 seasons.

== See also ==
- List of college bowl games
- Kickoff Classic
