= 1980 Holiday Bowl =

SMU Mustangs	BYU Cougars
(8–3)	(11–1)
SWC	WAC
45	46
Head coach: Ron Meyer	Head coach: LaVell Edwards
AP / Coaches; 19 / 19	AP / Coaches; 14 / 15
	1	2	3	4	Total
SMU	19	10	9	7	45
BYU	7	6	6	27	46
- Date: December 19, 1980
- Season: 1980
- Stadium: Jack Murphy Stadium
- Location: San Diego, California, U.S.
- MVP: Jim McMahon (BYU); Craig James (SMU)
- Referee: John McClintock (Big Eight)
- Attendance: 50,200
- Payout: US$261,035 per team

United States TV coverage
- Network: Mizlou
- Announcers: Ray Scott and Grady Alderman

The 1980 Holiday Bowl was a college football bowl game played December 19, 1980, in San Diego, California. It was part of the 1980 NCAA Division I-A football season. The game is famous due to a furious fourth quarter rally—including a last-second "miracle" touchdown—that gave BYU a 46–45 victory over SMU. Thus, the game is known as the “Miracle Bowl”, especially among BYU fans.

== Background ==
The Holiday Bowl was a young bowl game at the time, in only its third year. The 1980 Holiday Bowl pitted Brigham Young University (BYU) against Southern Methodist University (SMU). BYU entered the game with an 11–1 record. After losing the first game of the season (a 25–21 upset against New Mexico), the Cougars won 11 straight games to claim the Western Athletic Conference (WAC) Championship. BYU had overwhelmed most opponents with a high-powered pass-oriented offense led by future NFL quarterback Jim McMahon. The Cougars led the NCAA in total offense (535.0 yards per game), scoring (46.7 points per game), and passing offense (409.8 passing yards per game) during the 1980 regular season.

In contrast, SMU entered the game with an explosive run-heavy offense, nicknamed the "Pony Express." The Mustangs were led by two star running backs, Craig James and Eric Dickerson. Both James and Dickerson went on to careers in the NFL; Dickerson achieved superstar status with the Los Angeles Rams from 1983 to 1986, and with the Indianapolis Colts from 1987 to 1991. The Mustangs entered the game with an 8–3 record, impressive considering they played in the tough Southwest Conference (SWC).

== Game summary ==
BYU had never won a bowl game in school history, having lost the 1974 Fiesta Bowl and 1976 Tangerine Bowl as well as the first two Holiday Bowls in 1978 and 1979. For the first 56 minutes of the 1980 Holiday Bowl, it seemed the Cougars were headed for another defeat. BYU's defense couldn't handle SMU's offense, as James ran for 225 yards and Dickerson added 110. With four minutes left in the game, the Mustangs scored to take a commanding 45–25 lead.

Many BYU fans started leaving the stadium. McMahon screamed at them, declaring that the game wasn't over yet. He promptly threw a touchdown pass to Matt Braga, and BYU recovered an onside kick. The Cougars quickly marched down the field, ending the drive with a 1-yard touchdown run by Scott Phillips. SMU's lead had been trimmed to 45–39. The Cougar defense forced the Mustangs to punt on their next possession. BYU's Bill Schoepflin blocked the punt by SMU's Eric Kaifes with 13 seconds left. The Cougar offense took over at the 41-yard line, with a last chance to win the game.

After throwing two incomplete passes, McMahon launched a Hail Mary into the end zone as time expired. Smothered by four SMU defenders, BYU tight end Clay Brown managed to leap above them and haul in the football, scoring one of the most miraculous touchdowns in college football history. With the score tied, BYU's Kurt Gunther kicked the winning extra point to give the Cougars a 46–45 victory.

BYU scored 21 points in the last 2:33. McMahon completed 32 of 49 passes for 446 yards to share MVP honors with SMU's James. The final statistics were remarkably even: SMU racked up 25 first downs and 446 total yards; BYU finished with 23 first downs and 444 total yards.

== Scoring summary ==
- SMU - Dickerson 15-yard run touchdown
- SMU - James 45-yard run touchdown
- SMU - Safety
- SMU - Garcia 42-yard field goal
- BYU - Brown 64-yard pass touchdown from McMahon (Gunther kick)
- SMU - James 3-yard pass touchdown from McIlhenny (Garcia kick)
- SMU - Garcia 44-yard field goal
- BYU - Sikahema 83-yard punt return touchdown (pass failed)
- SMU - Dickerson 1-yard run (pass failed)
- BYU - Brown 13-yard pass touchdown from McMahon (pass failed)
- SMU - Garcia 42-yard field goal
- BYU - Phillips 1-yard run touchdown (pass failed)
- SMU - James 42-yard run touchdown (Garcia kick)
- BYU - Braga 15-yard pass touchdown from McMahon (Pass failed)
- BYU - Phillips 1-yard run touchdown (pass to Phillips)
- BYU - Brown 41-yard pass touchdown from McMahon (Gunther kick)

== Legacy ==
In 2003, ESPN's "Page 2" feature listed the 1980 Holiday Bowl as one of the top 10 greatest bowl games ever played.

The game was placed in NCAA Football video games as a "College Classic", challenging players to recreate the ending. In the 2004 edition, the challenge begins with the player as BYU, incorrectly trailing 45–25 attempting a PAT with 2:33 left, when the actual game had BYU attempting a two point conversion after just scoring a touchdown with 2:33 left to make the game 45-31, making the challenge much more difficult than in real life with most players having to convert two onside kicks to complete it. This was fixed in the 2005 edition, with the score being the 45-31 with 2:33 remaining and the player playing as BYU attempting a PAT as it was in real life.

BYU and SMU were conference rivals in the WAC from 1996 to 1998. SMU joined the WAC after the SWC disbanded.

== Notable players ==
Both teams featured multiple notable players. SMU running back Eric Dickerson would later go on to a Pro Football Hall of Fame career with the Los Angeles Rams in the NFL and would set the single season rushing record, which still stands as of the conclusion of the 2021 season. SMU defensive lineman Michael Carter played nine seasons with the San Francisco 49ers winning three Super Bowls. Jim McMahon, the starting quarterback for BYU, would win two Super Bowls, including one as a member of the 1985 Chicago Bears team that is frequently considered one of the best teams in NFL history. He would win another one as a backup to Brett Favre with the Green Bay Packers in 1996. Andy Reid, who is more known for his successful coaching career, was a starting offensive lineman on the team. Reid would go on to win Super Bowl XXXI as an assistant with the Packers and Super Bowl LIV, Super Bowl LVII and Super Bowl LVIII as the head coach of the Kansas City Chiefs. Backup quarterback for BYU, Steve Young, who didn't play that season, would go on to a Hall of Fame career winning three Super Bowls, one without Joe Montana, all with the 49ers. BYU's Vai Sikahema, who had a punt return touchdown in the game, would go on to play eight seasons in the NFL. Sikahema led the league twice in punt return yards and is listed by NFL.com as the second "Most Feared Returners of All Time."
