= 1980 Cal State Fullerton Titans football team =

American college football season

1980 Cal State Fullerton Titans football
- Conference: Pacific Coast Athletic Association
- Record: 4–7 (1–4 PCAA)
- Head coach: Gene Murphy (1st season)
- Defensive coordinator: Bob Burt (1st season)
- Home stadium: Titan Field

1980 Pacific Coast Athletic Association football standings
	Conf.					Overall
Team	W		L		T	W		L		T
Long Beach State $	5	–	0	–	0	8	–	3	–	0
Utah State	4	–	1	–	0	6	–	5	–	0
San Jose State	3	–	2	–	0	7	–	4	–	0
Fresno State	1	–	4	–	0	5	–	6	–	0
Cal State Fullerton	1	–	4	–	0	4	–	7	–	0
Pacific (CA)	1	–	4	–	0	4	–	8	–	0
$ – Conference champion

The 1980 Cal State Fullerton Titans football team represented California State University, Fullerton as a member of the Pacific Coast Athletic Association (PCAA) during the 1980 NCAA Division I-A football season. Led by first-year head coach Gene Murphy, Cal State Fullerton compiled an overall record of 4–7 with a mark of 1–4 in conference play, placing in a three-way tie for fourth place in the PCAA. The Titans played two home games for the third year in a row, both at Titan Field on the Cal State Fullerton campus. The football team shared the stadium with the Cal State Fullerton Titans baseball from 1980 to 1982.

== Schedule ==
Date	Opponent	Site	Result	Attendance	Source
September 6	at Fresno State	Titan Field; Fullerton, CA	W 39–25	7,282	
September 20	at Cal Poly*	Mustang Stadium; San Luis Obispo, CA	W 30–23	7,160	
September 27	Northern Arizona*	Titan Field; Fullerton, CA	W 21–13	7,301	
October 4	at UNLV*	Las Vegas Silver Bowl; Whitney, NV	L 17–36	21,974	
October 11	Utah State	Titan Field; Fullerton, CA	L 17–28	6,293	
October 18	at No. 9 Boise State*	Bronco Stadium; Boise, ID	L 11–26	17,052	
October 25	at Nevada*	Mackay Stadium; Reno, NV	W 17–16	10,177	
November 1	at Hawaii*	Aloha Stadium; Halawa, HI	L 21–31	38,166	
November 8	at Long Beach State	Anaheim Stadium; Anaheim, CA	L 10–20	7,351	
November 15	at San Jose State	Spartan Stadium; San Jose, CA	L 21–33	10,021	
November 22	at Pacific (CA)	Pacific Memorial Stadium; Stockton, CA	L 26–32	2,854	
*Non-conference game; Rankings from AP (NCAA Division I-AA) Poll released prior to the game

== Team players in the NFL ==
The following Cal State Fullerton Titans were selected in the 1981 NFL draft.

Player	Position	Round	Overall	NFL team
Bobby Kemp	Defensive back	8	202	Cincinnati Bengals
