= Willie Hurst =

American football player (born 1980)

Profile
- Position: Halfback

Personal information
- Born: March 14, 1980 (age 46); Compton, California, U.S.
- Listed height: 5 ft 10 in (1.78 m)
- Listed weight: 200 lb (91 kg)

Career information
- High school: Manuel Dominguez (CA)
- College: Washington

Career history
- 2002–2003: B.C. Lions

Awards and highlights
- Washington Offensive MVP (2001); Holiday Bowl Co-Offensive MVP (2001)

Willie Burnell Hurst (born March 14, 1980) is an American former professional football player who was a running back for the B.C. Lions of the Canadian Football League (CFL). He played college football for the Washington Huskies.

== High school ==
Hurst was a standout high school football player at Dominguez, earning All-CIF honors as a senior and received six votes in the Long Beach Press Telegram's "Best in the West" voting. Hurst also played point guard for the basketball team.

== College career ==
Hurst played at the University of Washington from 1998 to 2001.

== Professional career ==
Hurst played for the B.C. Lions of the CFL, rushing for 164 yards on 17 carries in his debut.

== After football ==
Hurst is a coach at Lakeside.

== See also ==
- Washington Huskies football statistical leaders
