= 1980 Arkansas Razorbacks football team =

American college football season

1980 Arkansas Razorbacks football

Hall of Fame Classic champion

Hall of Fame Classic, W 34–15 vs. Tulane
- Conference: Southwest Conference
- Record: 7–5 (3–5 SWC)
- Head coach: Lou Holtz (4th season)
- Defensive coordinator: Bob Cope (1st season)
- Captains: Keith Houfek; George Stewart
- Home stadium: Razorback Stadium; War Memorial Stadium

1980 Southwest Conference football standings
	Conf.					Overall
Team	W		L		T	W		L		T
No. 14 Baylor $	8	–	0	–	0	10	–	2	–	0
No. 20 SMU	5	–	3	–	0	8	–	4	–	0
Houston	5	–	3	–	0	7	–	5	–	0
Texas	4	–	4	–	0	7	–	5	–	0
Rice	4	–	4	–	0	5	–	6	–	0
Arkansas	3	–	5	–	0	7	–	5	–	0
Texas A&M	3	–	5	–	0	4	–	7	–	0
Texas Tech	3	–	5	–	0	5	–	6	–	0
TCU	1	–	7	–	0	1	–	10	–	0
$ – Conference champion; Rankings from AP Poll

The 1980 Arkansas Razorbacks football team represented the University of Arkansas during the 1980 NCAA Division I-A football season. A bright spot for the Hogs in 1980 was senior punter Steve Cox. He led college football with an average of 46.5 yards per punt. He won Super Bowl XXII with the Washington Redskins. Cox completed one of only six field goals of 60+ yards in NFL history. Running back Gary Anderson was named MVP of the Hall of Fame Classic.

== Schedule ==
Date	Opponent	Rank	Site	TV	Result	Attendance	Source
September 1	at No. 10 Texas	No. 6	Texas Memorial Stadium; Austin, TX (rivalry)	ABC	L 17–23	70,000	
September 20	Oklahoma State*	No. 17	War Memorial Stadium; Little Rock, AR		W 33–20	55,822	
September 27	Tulsa*	No. 15	Razorback Stadium; Fayetteville, AR		W 13–10	41,082	
October 4	TCU	No. 14	Razorback Stadium; Fayetteville, AR		W 44–7	42,314	
October 11	Wichita State*	No. 15	War Memorial Stadium; Little Rock, AR		W 27–7	54,268	
October 25	at Houston	No. 15	Houston Astrodome; Houston, TX		L 17–24	41,308	
November 1	Rice		War Memorial Stadium; Little Rock, AR		L 16–17	53,858	
November 8	at No. 16 Baylor		Baylor Stadium; Waco, TX		L 15–42	46,000	
November 15	Texas A&M		Razorback Stadium; Fayetteville, AR (rivalry)	ABC	W 27–24	38,715	
November 22	at SMU		Texas Stadium; Irving, TX		L 7–31	28,225	
November 29	Texas Tech		War Memorial Stadium; Little Rock, AR (rivalry)		W 22–16	50,926	
December 27	vs. Tulane*		Legion Field; Birmingham, AL (Hall of Fame Classic)	Mizlou	W 34–15	29,000	
*Non-conference game; Rankings from AP Poll released prior to the game

== Roster ==
1980 Arkansas Razorbacks football team roster
Players
Coaches
Offense

Pos.	#	Name	Class
RB	43	Gary Anderson	So
WR	27	Bobby Duckworth	Sr
QB	11	Tom Jones	So
G	74	George Stewart	Sr

Defense

Pos.	#	Name	Class
DB		Keith Burns
DB		Kim Dameron	So
DE	87	Billy Ray Smith	So

Special teams

Pos.	#	Name	Class

Head coach

- Lou Holtz

Coordinators/assistant coaches

- Dave Wommack – Graduate assistant

Legend

- (C) Team captain
- (S) Suspended
- (I) Ineligible
- Injured
- Redshirt
