= 1980 Utah State Aggies football team =

American college football season

1980 Utah State Aggies football
- Conference: Pacific Coast Athletic Association
- Record: 6–5 (4–1 PCAA)
- Head coach: Bruce Snyder (5th season)
- Home stadium: Romney Stadium

1980 Pacific Coast Athletic Association football standings
	Conf.					Overall
Team	W		L		T	W		L		T
Long Beach State $	5	–	0	–	0	8	–	3	–	0
Utah State	4	–	1	–	0	6	–	5	–	0
San Jose State	3	–	2	–	0	7	–	4	–	0
Fresno State	1	–	4	–	0	5	–	6	–	0
Cal State Fullerton	1	–	4	–	0	4	–	7	–	0
Pacific (CA)	1	–	4	–	0	4	–	8	–	0
$ – Conference champion

The 1980 Utah State Aggies football team represented Utah State University as a new member of the Pacific Coast Athletic Association (PCAA) during the 1980 NCAA Division I-A football season. The Aggies were led by fifth-year head coach Bruce Snyder and played their home games at Romney Stadium in Logan, Utah. They finished the season with a record of six wins and five losses (6–5, 4–1 PCAA).

== Schedule ==
Date	Opponent	Site	Result	Attendance	Source
September 6	at Kentucky*	Commonwealth Stadium; Lexington, KY	L 10–17	57,900	
September 13	Idaho State*	Romney Stadium; Logan, UT	W 14–7	16,187	
September 20	at No. 7 Texas*	Texas Memorial Stadium; Austin, TX	L 17–35	63,000	
October 4	Utah*	Romney Stadium; Logan, UT (Battle of the Brothers, Beehive Boot)	L 19–23	20,166	
October 11	at Cal State Fullerton	Titan Stadium; Fullerton, CA	W 28–17	6,293	
October 18	BYU*	Romney Stadium; Logan, UT (rivalry, Beehive Boot)	L 46–70	23,230	
October 25	at Fresno State	Ratcliffe Stadium; Fresno, CA	W 14–0	10,482	
November 1	Pacific (CA)	Romney Stadium; Logan, UT	W 21–7	15,123	
November 8	at Weber State*	Wildcat Stadium; Ogden, UT	W 50–13	12,202	
November 15	at Long Beach State	Anaheim Stadium; Anaheim, CA	L 27–28	11,168	
November 22	at San Jose State	Spartan Stadium; San Jose, CA	W 44–38	16,318	
*Non-conference game; Rankings from AP Poll released prior to the game

== Roster ==
1980 Utah State Aggies football team roster
Players			Coaches
Offense: Pos. / # / Name / Class; WR / 81 / James Murphy	Defense: Pos. / # / Name / Class	Special teams: Pos. / # / Name / Class	Head coach: Bruce Snyder; Coordinators/assistant coaches Legend: (C) Team captain; (S) Suspended; (I) Ineligible; Injured; Redshirt
