= 1980 Texas Tech Red Raiders football team =

American college football season

1980 Texas Tech Red Raiders football
- Conference: Southwest Conference
- Record: 5–6 (3–5 SWC)
- Head coach: Rex Dockery (3rd season)
- Offensive coordinator: Vic Wallace (1st season)
- Offensive scheme: Option
- Defensive coordinator: Jim Bates (1st season)
- Base defense: 4–3
- Home stadium: Jones Stadium

1980 Southwest Conference football standings
	Conf.					Overall
Team	W		L		T	W		L		T
No. 14 Baylor $	8	–	0	–	0	10	–	2	–	0
No. 20 SMU	5	–	3	–	0	8	–	4	–	0
Houston	5	–	3	–	0	7	–	5	–	0
Texas	4	–	4	–	0	7	–	5	–	0
Rice	4	–	4	–	0	5	–	6	–	0
Arkansas	3	–	5	–	0	7	–	5	–	0
Texas A&M	3	–	5	–	0	4	–	7	–	0
Texas Tech	3	–	5	–	0	5	–	6	–	0
TCU	1	–	7	–	0	1	–	10	–	0
$ – Conference champion; Rankings from AP Poll

The 1980 Texas Tech Red Raiders football team represented Texas Tech University as a member of the Southwest Conference (SWC) during the 1980 NCAA Division I-A football season. In their third and final season under head coach Rex Dockery, the Red Raiders compiled a 5–6 record (3–5 against SWC opponents), were outscored by a combined total of 188 to 178, and finished in a tie for sixth place in the conference. The team played its home games at Clifford B. and Audrey Jones Stadium in Lubbock, Texas.

== Schedule ==
Date	Opponent	Site	Result	Attendance	Source
September 6	UTEP*	Jones Stadium; Lubbock, TX	W 35–7	37,122	
September 13	No. 15 North Carolina*	Jones Stadium; Lubbock, TX	L 3–9	37,797	
September 20	New Mexico*	Jones Stadium; Lubbock, TX	W 28–17	38,873	
September 27	Baylor	Jones Stadium; Lubbock, TX (rivalry)	L 23–24	48,539	
October 4	at Texas A&M	Kyle Field; College Station, TX (rivalry)	L 21–41	65,490	
October 18	at Rice	Rice Stadium; Houston, TX	W 10–3	10,000	
November 1	No. 12 Texas	Jones Stadium; Lubbock, TX (rivalry)	W 24–20	50,132	
November 8	at TCU	Amon G. Carter Stadium; Fort Worth, TX (rivalry)	L 17–24	18,752	
November 15	No. 18 SMU^{†}	Jones Stadium; Lubbock, TX	W 14–0	42,197	
November 22	Houston	Jones Stadium; Lubbock, TX (rivalry)	L 7–34	36,386	
November 29	at Arkansas	War Memorial Stadium; Little Rock, AR (rivalry)	L 16–22	50,926	
*Non-conference game; ^{†}Homecoming; Rankings from AP Poll released prior to the game

== Roster ==
1980 Texas Tech Red Raiders football team roster
Players
Coaches
Offense

Pos.	#	Name	Class
QB	12	Ron Reeves

Defense

Pos.	#	Name	Class
LB	49	Jeff McKinney
SS	25	Tate Randle
DT	60	Gabriel Rivera
FS	21	Ted Watts

Special teams

Pos.	#	Name	Class
P	7	Maury Buford

Head coach

- Rex Dockery

Coordinators/assistant coaches

Legend

- (C) Team captain
- (S) Suspended
- (I) Ineligible
- Injured
- Redshirt
