= 1981 Cotton Bowl Classic =

- 45th Cotton Bowl Classic
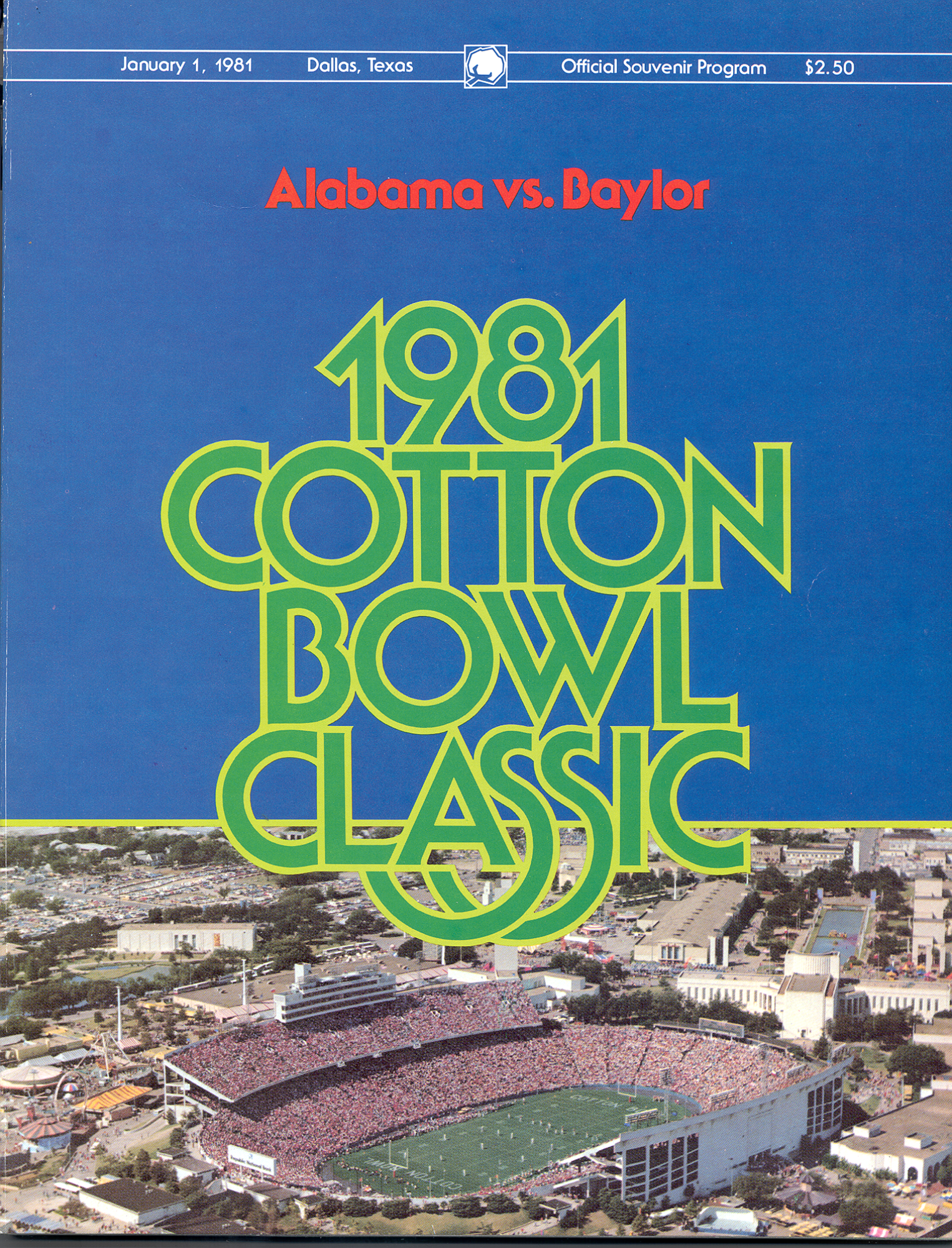
Alabama Crimson Tide	Baylor Bears
(9–2)	(10–1)
SEC	SWC
30	2
Head coach: Bear Bryant	Head coach: Grant Teaff
AP / Coaches; 9 / 6	AP / Coaches; 6 / 7
	1	2	3	4	Total
Alabama	6	7	3	14	30
Baylor	2	0	0	0	2
- Date: January 1, 1981
- Season: 1980
- Stadium: Cotton Bowl
- Location: Dallas, Texas
- MVP: Warren Lyles (Alabama NG); Major Ogilvie (Alabama RB)
- Favorite: Alabama by 3½ points
- Referee: Vance Carlson (Big Eight)
- Attendance: 74,281

United States TV coverage
- Network: CBS
- Announcers: Lindsey Nelson (Play-by-play); Roger Staubach (Color); Frank Glieber (Sideline)

The Cotton Bowl in Dallas, Texas, hosted the Cotton Bowl Classic.

The 1981 Cotton Bowl Classic was the 45th edition of the college football bowl game, played at the Cotton Bowl in Dallas, Texas, on Thursday, January 1. Part of the 1980–81 bowl game season, it matched the ninth-ranked Alabama Crimson Tide of the Southeastern Conference (SEC) and the #6 Baylor Bears of the Southwest Conference (SWC). Favored Alabama shut out the Baylor offense and won, 30–2.

== Game summary ==
Televised by CBS, the game kicked off shortly after 1 p.m. CST, at the same time as the Sugar Bowl on ABC.

Alabama took a 6–0 lead on a pair of Peter Kim field goals. Baylor responded later in the first quarter with its only points of the game when Tommy Tabor sacked Alabama quarterback Walter Lewis in the end zone for a safety to bring the score to 6–2. The Crimson Tide extended their lead to 13–2 at the half following a one-yard Major Ogilvie touchdown run in the second quarter.

After a third Kim field goal in the third, Alabama closed out the fourth quarter with a pair of touchdowns; Don Jacobs scored on a one-yard run, followed by Mark Nix from three yards out to make the final score 30–2. Alabama linebacker Warren Lyles was named the defensive MVP, and running back Ogilvie took the offensive honors.

=== Scoring ===
First quarter

- Alabama - Peter Kim 29-yard field goal
- Alabama - Kim 27-yard field goal
- Baylor - Safety, quarterback Walter Lewis tackled by Tommy Tabor in the end zone

Second quarter

- Alabama - Major Ogilvie 1-yard run (Kim kick)

Third quarter

- Alabama - Kim 42-yard field goal

Fourth quarter

- Alabama - Don Jacobs 1-yard run (Kim kick)
- Alabama - Mark Nix 2-yard run (George Mardini kick)

== Statistics ==
Statistics	Alabama	Baylor
First downs	17	13
Rushes–yards	67–241	35–54
Passing yards	98	104
Passes	5–12–0	12–27–3
Total offense	79–339	62–158
Punts–average	6–37	7–35
Fumbles–lost	5–1	5–4
Turnovers	1	7
Penalties–yards	5–89	6–59

== Aftermath ==
This was the final collegiate game for Baylor's All-American linebacker Mike Singletary, a future College and Pro Football Hall of Famer.

In the final AP poll, Alabama climbed to sixth and Baylor dropped to fourteenth.
