= 2001 Holiday Bowl =

2001 Culligan Holiday Bowl
Washington Huskies	Texas Longhorns
(8–3)	(10–2)
Pac-10	Big 12
43	47
Head coach: Rick Neuheisel	Head coach: Mack Brown
AP / Coaches / BCS; 21 / 20 / 15	AP / Coaches / BCS; 9 / 9 / 7
	1	2	3	4	Total
Washington	0	23	13	7	43
Texas	0	14	6	27	47
- Date: December 28, 2001
- Season: 2001
- Stadium: Qualcomm Stadium
- Location: San Diego, California
- MVP: Co-Offensive: Major Applewhite (UT, QB); 37-55, 473 yards, 4 TD; Co-Offensive: Willie Hurst (UW, RB); 16 rushes, 137 yards, 2 TD; Defensive: Derrick Johnson (UT, LB); 7 tackles, 1 TFL, 1 sack, 1 INT
- Referee: Ken Rivera (Mtn. West)
- Halftime show: Marching bands
- Attendance: 60,548
- Payout: US$2,044,988 per team

United States TV coverage
- Network: ESPN
- Announcers: Mike Tirico, Lee Corso, Kirk Herbstreit, and Dr. Jerry Punch

The 2001 Culligan Holiday Bowl was a college football bowl game played December 28, 2001, in San Diego, California. It was part of the 2001 NCAA Division I-A football season. It featured the Washington Huskies against the Texas Longhorns. Texas won 47–43 (a combined 90 points despite neither team scoring at all in the 1st quarter) after a dramatic comeback in the 4th quarter, scoring the winning touchdown with 38 seconds left. Earlier, Washington had led by as much as 19 points, and carried a 36–20 lead into the 4th quarter.

== Scoring summary ==
=== Scoring summary ===
Scoring summary

Quarter	Time	Drive			Team	Scoring information	Score	
Quarter	Time	Plays	Yards	TOP	Team	Scoring information	Washington	Texas
2	13:06	9	54	3:04	Washington	43-yard field goal by John Anderson	3	0
2	12:30	4	0	0:24	Washington	43-yard field goal by John Anderson	6	0
2	6:54				Washington	Interception returned 38 yards for touchdown by Tank Johnson, John Anderson kick good	13	0
2	5:23	4	80	1:31	Texas	B.J. Johnson 43-yard touchdown reception from Major Applewhite, Dusty Mangum kick good	13	7
2	1:55	8	54	2:33	Texas	Roy Williams 25-yard touchdown reception from Major Applewhite, Dusty Mangum kick good	13	14
2	0:47	8	76	1:08	Washington	Joe Collier 4-yard touchdown reception from Cody Pickett, John Anderson kick good	20	14
2	0:00	5	18	0:33	Washington	40-yard field goal by John Anderson	23	14
3	7:46	12	91	5:15	Washington	Jerramy Stevens 17-yard touchdown reception from Cody Pickett, John Anderson kick good	30	14
3	5:37	8	66	2:09	Texas	26-yard field goal by Dusty Mangum	30	17
3	3:51	6	65	1:46	Washington	Willie Hurst 4-yard touchdown run, 2-point pass intercepted	36	17
3	1:18	9	57	2:33	Texas	24-yard field goal by Dusty Mangum	36	20
4	11:54	10	48	2:51	Texas	Matt Trissel 2-yard touchdown reception from Major Applewhite, 2-point pass failed	36	26
4	8:01	5	54	2:05	Texas	Ivan Williams 1-yard touchdown run, Dusty Mangum kick good	36	33
4	6:00	3	9	0:57	Texas	Bo Scaife 4-yard touchdown reception from Major Applewhite, Dusty Mangum kick good	36	40
4	1:49	7	80	1:49	Washington	Willie Hurst 34-yard touchdown run, John Anderson kick good	43	40
4	0:38	7	80	1:11	Texas	Ivan Williams 3-yard touchdown run, Dusty Mangum kick good	43	47
"TOP" = time of possession. For other American football terms, see Glossary of American football.							43	47
