= 1980 SMU Mustangs football team =

American college football season

1980 SMU Mustangs football

Holiday Bowl, L 45–46 vs. BYU
- Conference: Southwest Conference

Ranking
- Coaches: No. 20
- AP: No. 20
- Record: 8–4 (5–3 SWC)
- Head coach: Ron Meyer (5th season)
- Offensive scheme: Option
- Defensive coordinator: Steve Sidwell (5th season)
- Base defense: 3–4
- Home stadium: Texas Stadium

1980 Southwest Conference football standings
| | Conf. | | | | | Overall |
| Team | W | | L | | T | W | | L | | T |
|---|---|---|---|---|---|---|---|---|---|---|
| No. 14 Baylor $ | 8 | – | 0 | – | 0 | 10 | – | 2 | – | 0 |
| No. 20 SMU | 5 | – | 3 | – | 0 | 8 | – | 4 | – | 0 |
| Houston | 5 | – | 3 | – | 0 | 7 | – | 5 | – | 0 |
| Texas | 4 | – | 4 | – | 0 | 7 | – | 5 | – | 0 |
| Rice | 4 | – | 4 | – | 0 | 5 | – | 6 | – | 0 |
| Arkansas | 3 | – | 5 | – | 0 | 7 | – | 5 | – | 0 |
| Texas A&M | 3 | – | 5 | – | 0 | 4 | – | 7 | – | 0 |
| Texas Tech | 3 | – | 5 | – | 0 | 5 | – | 6 | – | 0 |
| TCU | 1 | – | 7 | – | 0 | 1 | – | 10 | – | 0 |
$ – Conference champion; Rankings from AP Poll

The 1980 SMU Mustangs football team represented Southern Methodist University (SMU) as a member of the Southwest Conference (SWC) during the 1980 NCAA Division I-A football season. Led by fifth-year head coach Ron Meyer, the Mustangs compiled an overall record 8–4 with a mark of 5–3 in conference play, tying for second place in the SWC. SMU was invited to the Holiday Bowl, there they lost to BYU. The Mustangs finished the season ranked No. 20 in both major polls.

== Schedule ==
| Date | Opponent | Rank | Site | TV | Result | Attendance | Source |
|---|---|---|---|---|---|---|---|
| September 13 | North Texas State* | | Texas Stadium; Irving, TX (rivalry) | | W 28–9 | 52,781 | |
| September 20 | TCU | | Texas Stadium; Irving, TX (rivalry) | | W 17–14 | 39,622 | |
| September 27 | UT Arlington* | | Texas Stadium; Irving, TX | | W 52–16 | 26,611 | |
| October 4 | at Tulane* | | Louisiana Superdome; New Orleans, LA | | W 31–21 | 42,563 | |
| October 11 | at No. 18 Baylor | No. 20 | Baylor Stadium; Waco, TX | | L 28–32 | 35,000 | |
| October 18 | Houston | | Texas Stadium; Irving, TX (rivalry) | | L 11–13 | 32,109 | |
| October 25 | at No. 2 Texas | | Texas Memorial Stadium; Austin, TX | ABC | W 20–6 | 73,535 | |
| November 1 | Texas A&M | No. 19 | Texas Stadium; Irving, TX | | W 27–0 | 41,289 | |
| November 8 | at Rice | No. 18 | Rice Stadium; Houston, TX (rivalry) | | W 34–14 | 23,000 | |
| November 15 | at Texas Tech | No. 18 | Jones Stadium; Lubbock, TX | | L 0–14 | 42,197 | |
| November 22 | Arkansas | | Texas Stadium; Irving, TX | | W 31–7 | 28,225 | |
| December 19 | vs. No. 14 BYU* | No. 19 | San Diego Stadium; San Diego, CA (Holiday Bowl) | Mizlou | L 45–46 | 50,200 | |
*Non-conference game; Rankings from AP Poll released prior to the game

== Roster ==
1980 SMU Mustangs football team roster
Players
Coaches
Offense

| Pos. | # | Name | Class |
|---|---|---|---|
| RB | 19 | Eric Dickerson | So |
| QB | 10 | Mike Ford | Sr |
| OL | 77 | Perry Hartnett | Jr |
| RB | 32 | Craig James | So |
| OL | 71 | Mike Jusko | Sr |
| OL | 67 | Mike Mason | Sr |
| OL | 76 | Lee Spivey | Sr |
| QB | 12 | Jim Bob Taylor | So |

Defense

| Pos. | # | Name | Class |
|---|---|---|---|
| DL | 75 | Harvey Armstrong | Jr |
| DB | 27 | Charles Bruton | Sr |
| DT | 74 | Michael Carter | So |
| DB | 29 | Russell Carter | Fr |
| DL | 99 | Eric Ferguson | Jr |
| DB | 9 | Mark Gibson | Sr |
| DL | 80 | Byron Hunt | Sr |
| DB | 20 | James Mobley | Jr |
| DB | 34 | John Simmons | Sr |

Special teams

| Pos. | # | Name | Class |
|---|---|---|---|
| K | 1 | Eddie Garcia | Jr |

Head coach

- Ron Meyer

Coordinators/assistant coaches

Legend

- (C) Team captain
- (S) Suspended
- (I) Ineligible
- Injured
- Redshirt

== Team players in the NFL ==
| Player | Position | Round | Pick | NFL club |
|---|---|---|---|---|
| John Simmons | Defensive back | 3 | 64 | Cincinnati Bengals |
