= 1980 Rice Owls football team =

American college football season

1980 Rice Owls football
- Conference: Southwest Conference
- Record: 5–6 (4–4 SWC)
- Head coach: Ray Alborn (3rd season)
- Home stadium: Rice Stadium

1980 Southwest Conference football standings
	Conf.					Overall
Team	W		L		T	W		L		T
No. 14 Baylor $	8	–	0	–	0	10	–	2	–	0
No. 20 SMU	5	–	3	–	0	8	–	4	–	0
Houston	5	–	3	–	0	7	–	5	–	0
Texas	4	–	4	–	0	7	–	5	–	0
Rice	4	–	4	–	0	5	–	6	–	0
Arkansas	3	–	5	–	0	7	–	5	–	0
Texas A&M	3	–	5	–	0	4	–	7	–	0
Texas Tech	3	–	5	–	0	5	–	6	–	0
TCU	1	–	7	–	0	1	–	10	–	0
$ – Conference champion; Rankings from AP Poll

The 1980 Rice Owls football team was an American football team that represented Rice University in the Southwest Conference during the 1980 NCAA Division I-A football season. In their third year under head coach Ray Alborn, the team compiled a 5–6 record.

The Owls' 17-7 victory vs. LSU ended a 13-game winless streak vs. the Bayou Bengals. It was Rice's first victory vs. LSU since 1966, the last season the Owls were coached by the legendary Jess Neely.

== Schedule ==
Date	Opponent	Site	Result	Attendance	Source
September 13	at Clemson*	Memorial Stadium; Clemson, SC	L 3–19	60,361	
September 20	at Tulane*	Louisiana Superdome; New Orleans, LA	L 14–35	40,321	
September 27	LSU*	Rice Stadium; Houston, TX	W 17–7	41,000	
October 4	No. 5 Texas	Rice Stadium; Houston, TX (rivalry)	L 28–41	63,163	
October 11	at TCU	Amon G. Carter Stadium; Fort Worth, TX	W 28–24	15,226	
October 18	Texas Tech	Rice Stadium; Houston, TX	L 3–10	10,000	
October 25	at Texas A&M	Kyle Field; College Station, TX	W 10–6	52,449	
November 1	at Arkansas	War Memorial Stadium; Little Rock, AR	W 17–16	53,858	
November 8	No. 18 SMU	Rice Stadium; Houston, TX (rivalry)	L 14–34	23,000	
November 15	No. 12 Baylor	Rice Stadium; Houston, TX	L 6–16	26,000	
November 29	at Houston	Houston Astrodome; Houston, TX (rivalry)	W 35–7	29,950	
*Non-conference game; Rankings from AP Poll released prior to the game

== Roster ==
1980 Rice Owls football team roster
Players
Coaches
Offense

Pos.	#	Name	Class
QB	8	Scott Clements	So
WR	2	Hosea Fortune	Jr
OT	51	Darryl Grant	Sr
QB	12	Robert Hoffmann	Jr
RB	39	Frank Wilson	Sr
WR	87	Bobby Williams	Sr

Defense

Pos.	#	Name	Class
DT	63	Tom Adams	Sr
DE	93	Dennis Berry	Jr
DB	25	David Darr	Sr
S	5	Michael Downs	Sr
LB	43	Lamont Jefferson	Sr
DB	40	Otis Mack	Sr
DT	72	Bryan Phillips	Sr
DT	75	Rodney Williams	Jr
LB	28	Robert Williamson	Sr

Special teams

Pos.	#	Name	Class
P	7	Dale Walters	So

Head coach

- Ray Alborn

Coordinators/assistant coaches

Legend

- (C) Team captain
- (S) Suspended
- (I) Ineligible
- Injured
- Redshirt
