= 1980 Texas A&M Aggies football team =

American college football season

1980 Texas A&M Aggies football
- Conference: Southwest Conference
- Record: 4–7 (3–5 SWC)
- Head coach: Tom Wilson (3rd season)
- Defensive coordinator: R. C. Slocum (2nd season)
- Home stadium: Kyle Field

1980 Southwest Conference football standings
	Conf.					Overall
Team	W		L		T	W		L		T
No. 14 Baylor $	8	–	0	–	0	10	–	2	–	0
No. 20 SMU	5	–	3	–	0	8	–	4	–	0
Houston	5	–	3	–	0	7	–	5	–	0
Texas	4	–	4	–	0	7	–	5	–	0
Rice	4	–	4	–	0	5	–	6	–	0
Arkansas	3	–	5	–	0	7	–	5	–	0
Texas A&M	3	–	5	–	0	4	–	7	–	0
Texas Tech	3	–	5	–	0	5	–	6	–	0
TCU	1	–	7	–	0	1	–	10	–	0
$ – Conference champion; Rankings from AP Poll

The 1980 Texas A&M Aggies football team represented Texas A&M University in the 1980 NCAA Division I-A football season as a member of the Southwest Conference (SWC). The Aggies were led by head coach Tom Wilson in his third season and finished with a record of four wins and seven losses (4–7 overall, 3–5 in the SWC).

== Schedule ==
Date	Opponent	Site	Result	Attendance	Source
September 6	at Ole Miss*	Mississippi Veterans Memorial Stadium; Jackson, MS	W 23–20	47,482	
September 13	at No. 12 Georgia*	Sanford Stadium; Athens, GA	L 0–42	60,150	
September 20	Penn State*	Kyle Field; College Station, TX	L 9–25	66,234	
October 4	Texas Tech	Kyle Field; College Station, TX (rivalry)	W 41–21	65,490	
October 11	at Houston	Houston Astrodome; Houston, TX	L 13–17	46,525	
October 18	No. 13 Baylor	Kyle Field; College Station, TX (rivalry)	L 7–46	69,735	
October 25	Rice	Kyle Field; College Station, TX	L 6–10	52,449	
November 1	at No. 19 SMU	Texas Stadium; Irving, TX	L 0–27	41,289	
November 15	at Arkansas	Razorback Stadium; Fayetteville, AR (rivalry)	L 24–27	38,715	
November 22	TCU	Kyle Field; College Station, TX (rivalry)	W 13–10	48,362	
November 29	at Texas	Texas Memorial Stadium; Austin, TX (rivalry)	W 24–14	72,537	
*Non-conference game; Rankings from AP Poll released prior to the game

== Roster ==
1980 Texas A&M Aggies football team roster
Players
Coaches
Offense

Pos.	#	Name	Class
RB	32	Johnny Hector	So
QB	16	Gary Kubiak	So
QB	11	Mike Mosley	Sr
WR	25	Mike Whitwell	Jr

Defense

Pos.	#	Name	Class
DE	80	Keith Baldwin	Jr
SS	37	Jeff Fuller	Fr
DT	74	Keith Guthrie	So

Special teams

Pos.	#	Name	Class
K	3	David Hardy	So

Head coach

- Tom Wilson

Coordinators/assistant coaches

Legend

- (C) Team captain
- (S) Suspended
- (I) Ineligible
- Injured
- Redshirt
