= 1980 Long Beach State 49ers football team =

American college football season

1980 Long Beach State 49ers football

PCAA champion
- Conference: Pacific Coast Athletic Association
- Record: 8–3 (5–0 PCAA)
- Head coach: Dave Currey (4th season)
- Home stadium: Anaheim Stadium

1980 Pacific Coast Athletic Association football standings
	Conf.					Overall
Team	W		L		T	W		L		T
Long Beach State $	5	–	0	–	0	8	–	3	–	0
Utah State	4	–	1	–	0	6	–	5	–	0
San Jose State	3	–	2	–	0	7	–	4	–	0
Fresno State	1	–	4	–	0	5	–	6	–	0
Cal State Fullerton	1	–	4	–	0	4	–	7	–	0
Pacific (CA)	1	–	4	–	0	4	–	8	–	0
$ – Conference champion

The 1980 Long Beach State 49ers football team represented California State University, Long Beach (Note: The official name of Long Beach State has been California State University, Long Beach since 1972. However, it is still commonly known as Long Beach State.) during the 1980 NCAA Division I-A football season.

Cal State Long Beach competed in the Pacific Coast Athletic Association. (Note: The Big West Conference was known as the Pacific Coast Athletic Association from its founding in 1969 through 1987.) The team was led by fourth-year head coach Dave Currey, and played home games at Anaheim Stadium in Anaheim, California. They finished the season as champions of the PCAA, with a record of eight wins, three losses (8–3, 5–0 PCAA).

== Schedule ==
Date	Time	Opponent	Site	Result	Attendance	Source
September 5	7:30 pm	Northern Illinois*	Anaheim Stadium; Anaheim, CA	L 9–16	9,052	
September 20	10:30 am	at Bowling Green*	Doyt Perry Stadium; Bowling Green, OH	W 23–21	14,407	
September 27	12:30 pm	at BYU*	Cougar Stadium; Provo, UT	L 25–41	37,152	
October 4	5:30 pm	at Tennessee State*	Hale Stadium; Nashville, TN	L 18–35	15,203	
October 11	1:30 pm	at Pacific (CA)	Pacific Memorial Stadium; Stockton, CA	W 17–12	13,058	
October 18	7:30 pm	at San Jose State	Spartan Stadium; San Jose, CA	W 23–21	11,725	
October 25	1:00 pm	at Oregon State*	Parker Stadium; Corvallis, OR	W 31–21	20,000	
November 1	1:30 pm	at Fresno State	Ratcliffe Stadium; Fresno, CA	W 34–9	8,228	
November 8	1:30 pm	Cal State Fullerton	Anaheim Stadium; Anaheim, CA	W 20–10	7,351	
November 15	7:30 pm	Utah State	Anaheim Stadium; Anaheim, CA	W 28–27	11,168	
November 22	7:30 pm	Drake*	Anaheim Stadium; Anaheim, CA	W 21–7	8,158	
*Non-conference game; All times are in Pacific time

== Roster ==
1980 Long Beach State 49ers football team roster
Players
Coaches
Offense

Pos.	#	Name	Class
QB		Doug Disney	So
RB		Dan Duddridge	Sr
WR		Ron Johnson	Sr
WR		Louis Leidelmeyer	Jr
FB		Corey Meredith	Sr
G		Dean Miraldi	Sr

Defense

Pos.	#	Name	Class
LB		Joe Lipp	Sr
DT	76	Ben Rudolph	Sr

Special teams

Pos.	#	Name	Class
P		Mike Horan	Jr

Head coach

- Dave Currey

Coordinators/assistant coaches

Legend

- (C) Team captain
- (S) Suspended
- (I) Ineligible
- Injured
- Redshirt

== Team players in the NFL ==
The following were selected in the 1981 NFL draft.

Player	Position	Round	Overall	NFL team
Dean Miraldi	Tackle, guard	2	55	Philadelphia Eagles
Ben Rudolph	Defensive tackle, defensive end	3	60	New York Jets
Ron Johnson	Wide receiver	7	170	Seattle Seahawks
Steve Folsom	Tight end	10	261	Miami Dolphins
