= 1980 Fresno State Bulldogs football team =

American college football season

1980 Fresno State Bulldogs football
- Conference: Pacific Coast Athletic Association
- Record: 5–6 (1–4 PCAA)
- Head coach: Jim Sweeney (3rd season)
- Home stadium: Bulldog Stadium

1980 Pacific Coast Athletic Association football standings
	Conf.					Overall
Team	W		L		T	W		L		T
Long Beach State $	5	–	0	–	0	8	–	3	–	0
Utah State	4	–	1	–	0	6	–	5	–	0
San Jose State	3	–	2	–	0	7	–	4	–	0
Fresno State	1	–	4	–	0	5	–	6	–	0
Cal State Fullerton	1	–	4	–	0	4	–	7	–	0
Pacific (CA)	1	–	4	–	0	4	–	8	–	0
$ – Conference champion

The 1980 Fresno State Bulldogs football team represented California State University, Fresno as a member of the Pacific Coast Athletic Association (PCAA) during the 1980 NCAA Division I-A football season. Led by Jim Sweeney, who returned for his third season as head coach after a two-year hiatus, the Bulldogs compiled an overall record of 5–6 with a mark of 1–4 in conference play, tying for fourth place in the PCAA.

The 1980 season saw the opening of a new on-campus football stadium, Bulldog Stadium. This increased the seating capacity for Fresno State football from 13,000 to 30,000.

== Schedule ==
Date	Opponent	Site	Result	Attendance	Source
September 6	at Cal State Fullerton	Titan Field; Fullerton, CA	L 25–39	7,282	
September 13	at UNLV*	Las Vegas Silver Bowl; Whitney, NV	L 6–35	19,085	
September 20	Southwestern Louisiana*	Ratcliffe Stadium; Fresno, CA	W 16–14	12,283	
September 27	at Utah*	Robert Rice Stadium; Salt Lake City, UT	L 12–27	25,358	
October 4	Cal Poly*	Ratcliffe Stadium; Fresno, CA	W 31–25	15,221	
October 11	at San Jose State	Spartan Stadium; San Jose, CA (rivalry)	L 14–26	14,120	
October 18	Pacific (CA)	Ratcliffe Stadium; Fresno, CA	W 27–3	12,782	
October 25	Utah State	Ratcliffe Stadium; Fresno, CA	L 0–14	10,482	
November 1	Long Beach State	Ratcliffe Stadium; Fresno, CA	L 9–34	8,228	
November 8	at Southern Illinois*	McAndrew Stadium; Carbondale, IL	W 31–14	9,800	
November 15	Montana State*	Bulldog Stadium; Fresno, CA	W 21–14	25,684	
*Non-conference game

== Team players in the NFL ==
The following were selected in the 1981 NFL draft.

Player	Position	Round	Overall	NFL team
Anthony Washington	Defensive back	2	44	Pittsburgh Steelers
