= 1980 TCU Horned Frogs football team =

American college football season

1980 TCU Horned Frogs football
- Conference: Southwest Conference
- Record: 1–10 (1–7 SWC)
- Head coach: F. A. Dry (4th season)
- Offensive scheme: Pro-style
- Defensive coordinator: Bob Junko (5th season)
- Base defense: 4–3
- Home stadium: Amon G. Carter Stadium

1980 Southwest Conference football standings
	Conf.					Overall
Team	W		L		T	W		L		T
No. 14 Baylor $	8	–	0	–	0	10	–	2	–	0
No. 20 SMU	5	–	3	–	0	8	–	4	–	0
Houston	5	–	3	–	0	7	–	5	–	0
Texas	4	–	4	–	0	7	–	5	–	0
Rice	4	–	4	–	0	5	–	6	–	0
Arkansas	3	–	5	–	0	7	–	5	–	0
Texas A&M	3	–	5	–	0	4	–	7	–	0
Texas Tech	3	–	5	–	0	5	–	6	–	0
TCU	1	–	7	–	0	1	–	10	–	0
$ – Conference champion; Rankings from AP Poll

The 1980 TCU Horned Frogs football team represented Texas Christian University (TCU) in the 1980 NCAA Division I-A football season. The Horned Frogs finished the season 1–10 overall and 1–7 in the Southwest Conference. The team was coached by F. A. Dry, in his fourth year as head coach. The Frogs played their home games in Amon G. Carter Stadium, which is located on campus in Fort Worth, Texas.

== Schedule ==
Date	Opponent	Site	Result	Attendance	Source
September 13	No. 18 Auburn*	Amon G. Carter Stadium; Fort Worth, TX	L 7–10	22,812	
September 20	at SMU	Texas Stadium; Irving, TX (rivalry)	L 14–17	39,622	
September 27	at No. 10 Georgia*	Sanford Stadium; Athens, GA	L 3–34	59,200	
October 4	at No. 14 Arkansas	Razorback Stadium; Fayetteville, AR	L 7–44	42,314	
October 11	Rice	Amon G. Carter Stadium; Fort Worth, TX	L 24–28	15,226	
October 18	Tulsa*	Amon G. Carter Stadium; Fort Worth, TX	L 17–23	12,367	
October 25	No. 11 Baylor	Amon G. Carter Stadium; Fort Worth, TX (rivalry)	L 6–21	22,385	
November 1	at Houston	Houston Astrodome; Houston, TX	L 5–37	26,502	
November 8	Texas Tech	Amon G. Carter Stadium; Fort Worth, TX (rivalry)	W 24–17	18,752	
November 15	Texas	Amon G. Carter Stadium; Fort Worth, TX (rivalry)	L 26–51	20,569	
November 22	at Texas A&M	Kyle Field; College Station, TX (rivalry)	L 10–13	48,362	
*Non-conference game; Rankings from AP Poll released prior to the game

== Roster ==
1980 TCU Horned Frogs football team roster
Players
Coaches
Offense

Pos.	#	Name	Class
WR	1	Phil Epps	Jr
QB	10	Steve Stamp	Jr

Defense

Pos.	#	Name	Class
LB	89	Kyle Clifton	Fr
LB	36	Mike Dry	Jr
DE	93	Greg Townsend

Special teams

Pos.	#	Name	Class
P		Stan Talley

Head coach

- F. A. Dry

Coordinators/assistant coaches

Legend

- (C) Team captain
- (S) Suspended
- (I) Ineligible
- Injured
- Redshirt
