= 1980 San Jose State Spartans football team =

American college football season

1980 San Jose State Spartans football
- Conference: Pacific Coast Athletic Association
- Record: 7–4 (3–2 PCAA)
- Head coach: Jack Elway (2nd season)
- Offensive coordinator: Dennis Erickson (2nd season)
- Home stadium: Spartan Stadium

1980 Pacific Coast Athletic Association football standings
	Conf.					Overall
Team	W		L		T	W		L		T
Long Beach State $	5	–	0	–	0	8	–	3	–	0
Utah State	4	–	1	–	0	6	–	5	–	0
San Jose State	3	–	2	–	0	7	–	4	–	0
Fresno State	1	–	4	–	0	5	–	6	–	0
Cal State Fullerton	1	–	4	–	0	4	–	7	–	0
Pacific (CA)	1	–	4	–	0	4	–	8	–	0
$ – Conference champion

The 1980 San Jose State Spartans football team represented San Jose State University during the 1980 NCAA Division I-A football season as a member of the Pacific Coast Athletic Association. (Note: The Big West Conference was known as the Pacific Coast Athletic Association from its founding in 1969 through 1987.) The team was led by head coach Jack Elway, in his second year at San Jose State, and the team played home games at Spartan Stadium in San Jose, California. The Spartans finished the 1980 season with a record of seven wins and four losses (7–4, 3–2 PCAA).

== Schedule ==
Date	Opponent	Site	TV	Result	Attendance	Source
September 6	Santa Clara*	Spartan Stadium; San Jose, CA		W 28–14	15,975	
September 13	at Washington State*	Joe Albi Stadium; Spokane, WA	ABC	W 31–26	18,153	
September 20	at Iowa State*	Cyclone Stadium; Ames, IA		L 6–27	47,806	
October 4	at No. 15 Stanford*	Stanford Stadium; Stanford, CA (rivalry)		L 21–35	61,127	
October 11	Fresno State^{†}	Spartan Stadium; San Jose, CA (rivalry)		W 26–14	14,120	
October 18	Long Beach State	Spartan Stadium; San Jose, CA		L 21–23	11,725	
October 25	Idaho*	Spartan Stadium; San Jose, CA		W 32–10	7,263	
November 1	at No. 10 Baylor*	Baylor Stadium; Waco, TX		W 30–22	35,000	
November 8	at Pacific (CA)	Pacific Memorial Stadium; Stockton, CA (Victory Bell)		W 28–23	17,569	
November 15	Cal State Fullerton	Spartan Stadium; San Jose, CA		W 33–21	10,021	
November 22	Utah State	Spartan Stadium; San Jose, CA		L 38–44	16,318	
*Non-conference game; ^{†}Homecoming; Rankings from AP Poll released prior to the game

== Team players in the NFL ==
The following were selected in the 1981 NFL draft.

Player	Position	Round	Overall	NFL team
Mark Nichols	Wide receiver	1	16	Detroit Lions

The following finished their college career in 1980, were not drafted, but played in the NFL.

Player	Position	First NFL team
Bill Benjamin	Linebacker	1987 Indianapolis Colts
Mike Katolin	Center	1987 Cleveland Browns
