= 1980 Pacific Tigers football team =

American college football season

1980 Pacific Tigers football
- Conference: Pacific Coast Athletic Association
- Record: 4–8 (1–4 PCAA)
- Head coach: Bob Toledo (2nd season)
- Home stadium: Pacific Memorial Stadium

1980 Pacific Coast Athletic Association football standings
	Conf.					Overall
Team	W		L		T	W		L		T
Long Beach State $	5	–	0	–	0	8	–	3	–	0
Utah State	4	–	1	–	0	6	–	5	–	0
San Jose State	3	–	2	–	0	7	–	4	–	0
Fresno State	1	–	4	–	0	5	–	6	–	0
Cal State Fullerton	1	–	4	–	0	4	–	7	–	0
Pacific (CA)	1	–	4	–	0	4	–	8	–	0
$ – Conference champion

The 1980 Pacific Tigers football team represented the University of the Pacific (UOP) in the 1980 NCAA Division I-A football season as a member of the Pacific Coast Athletic Association. (Note: The Big West Conference was known as the Pacific Coast Athletic Association from its founding in 1969 through 1987.)

The team was led by head coach Bob Toledo, in his second year, and played their home games at Pacific Memorial Stadium (Note: Amos Alonzo Stagg Memorial Stadium was known as Pacific Memorial Stadium from its opening in 1950 through 1987.) in Stockton, California. The Tigers finished the season with a record of four wins and eight losses (4–8, 1–4 PCAA), and were outscored 211 to 330.

== Schedule ==
Date	Opponent	Site	Result	Attendance	Source
September 6	at South Carolina*	Williams–Brice Stadium; Columbia, SC	L 0–37	56,211	
September 13	Idaho*	Pacific Memorial Stadium; Stockton, CA	W 24–13	15,000	
September 20	at Hawaii*	Aloha Stadium; Halawa, HI	L 14–25	43,900	
September 27	UTEP*	Pacific Memorial Stadium; Stockton, CA	W 28–14	14,203	
October 4	at Washington State*	Martin Stadium; Pullman, WA	W 24–22	18,123	
October 11	Long Beach State	Pacific Memorial Stadium; Stockton, CA	L 12–17	13,058	
October 18	at Fresno State	Ratcliffe Stadium; Fresno, CA	L 3–27	12,782	
October 25	at Arizona State*	Sun Devil Stadium; Tempe, AZ	L 9–37	57,579	
November 1	at Utah State	Romney Stadium; Logan, UT	L 7–21	15,123	
November 8	San Jose State^{†}	Pacific Memorial Stadium; Stockton, CA (Victory Bell)	L 23–28	17,569	
November 15	at Arizona*	Arizona Stadium; Tucson, AZ	L 35–63	39,576	
November 22	Cal State Fullerton	Pacific Memorial Stadium; Stockton, CA	W 32–26	2,854	
*Non-conference game; ^{†}Homecoming

== NFL draft ==
One Tiger was selected in the 1981 NFL draft.

Player	Position	Round	Overall	NFL team
Jeff Bednarek	Defensive tackle	11	306	Seattle Seahawks
