= 1980 Houston Cougars football team =

American college football season

1980 Houston Cougars football

Garden State Bowl champion

Garden State Bowl, W 35–0 vs. Navy
- Conference: Southwest Conference
- Record: 7–5 (5–3 SWC)
- Head coach: Bill Yeoman (19th season)
- Defensive coordinator: Don Todd (9th season)
- Captains: Terry Elston; Steve Bradham
- Home stadium: Houston Astrodome

1980 Southwest Conference football standings
	Conf.					Overall
Team	W		L		T	W		L		T
No. 14 Baylor $	8	–	0	–	0	10	–	2	–	0
No. 20 SMU	5	–	3	–	0	8	–	4	–	0
Houston	5	–	3	–	0	7	–	5	–	0
Texas	4	–	4	–	0	7	–	5	–	0
Rice	4	–	4	–	0	5	–	6	–	0
Arkansas	3	–	5	–	0	7	–	5	–	0
Texas A&M	3	–	5	–	0	4	–	7	–	0
Texas Tech	3	–	5	–	0	5	–	6	–	0
TCU	1	–	7	–	0	1	–	10	–	0
$ – Conference champion; Rankings from AP Poll

The 1980 Houston Cougars football team represented the University of Houston during the 1980 NCAA Division I-A football season. The Cougars were led by 19th-year head coach Bill Yeoman and played their home games at the Astrodome in Houston, Texas. The team competed as members of the Southwest Conference, finishing tied for second. Coming off of a Cotton Bowl-winning 1979 season, the Cougars started the year ranked in the top 10, but ended with a disappointing five regular season losses. Houston was invited to the 1980 Garden State Bowl, where they defeated Navy, 35–0.

== Schedule ==
Date	Opponent	Rank	Site	TV	Result	Attendance	Source
September 13	at Arizona State*	No. 9	Sun Devil Stadium; Tempe, AZ		L 13–29	64,868	
September 20	Miami (FL)*	No. 18	Houston Astrodome; Houston, TX		L 7–14	31,423	
September 27	North Texas State*		Houston Astrodome; Houston, TX		W 24–20	23,672	
October 4	at No. 20 Baylor		Baylor Stadium; Waco, TX (rivalry)		L 12–24	40,000	
October 11	Texas A&M		Houston Astrodome; Houston, TX		W 17–13	46,525	
October 18	at SMU		Texas Stadium; Irving, TX (rivalry)	ABC	W 13–11	32,109	
October 25	No. 15 Arkansas^{†}		Houston Astrodome; Houston, TX		W 24–17	41,308	
November 1	TCU		Houston Astrodome; Houston, TX		W 37–5	26,502	
November 8	at Texas		Texas Memorial Stadium; Austin, TX		L 13–15	79,154	
November 22	at Texas Tech		Jones Stadium; Lubbock, TX (rivalry)	ESPN	W 34–7	36,386	
November 29	Rice		Houston Astrodome; Houston, TX (rivalry)	ABC	L 7–35	29,950	
December 14	vs. Navy*		Giants Stadium; East Rutherford, NJ (Garden State Bowl)	Mizlou	W 35–0	41,117	
*Non-conference game; ^{†}Homecoming; Rankings from AP Poll released prior to the game

== Roster ==
1980 Houston Cougars football team roster
Players
Coaches
Offense

Pos.	#	Name	Class
QB	9	Delrick Brown	Sr
QB	7	Terry Elston	Sr
C	62	Billy Kidd	Jr

Defense

Pos.	#	Name	Class
DE	70	Leonard Mitchell	Sr
DT	79	Hosea Taylor	Sr

Special teams

Pos.	#	Name	Class

Head coach

- Bill Yeoman

Coordinators/assistant coaches

Legend

- (C) Team captain
- (S) Suspended
- (I) Ineligible
- Injured
- Redshirt
