= Ray Alborn =

American football player and coach (1938–2026)

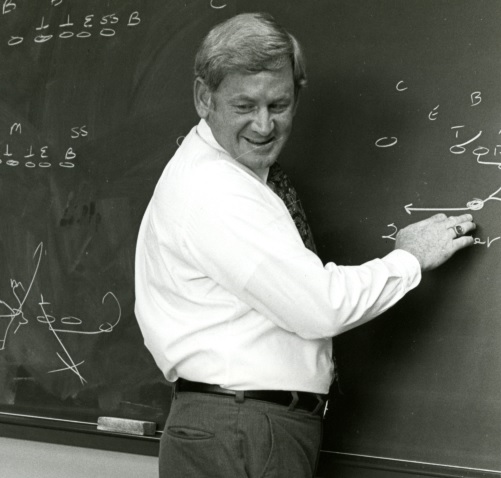
- Alborn draws a play in 1982 as Rice head coach

Biographical details
- Born: December 24, 1938; Orange, Texas, U.S.
- Died: November 4, 2026 (aged 87)

Playing career
- 1959–1961: Rice
- Position: Defensive tackle

Coaching career (HC unless noted)
- 1969–1971: Sharpstown HS (TX)
- 1972–1977: Rice (assistant)
- 1978–1983: Rice
- 1984–1985: Houston Gamblers (DL)
- 1986–1989: Lamar
- 1998–2001: Lamar Consolidated HS (TX)

Head coaching record
- Overall: 26–83 (college); 28–41–1 (high school)

Gus Raymond Alborn Jr. (December 24, 1938 – November 4, 2026) was an American football player and coach. He served as head football coach at Rice University from 1978 to 1983 and at Lamar University from 1986 to 1989, compiling a career college football record of 26–83.

== Biography ==
While coaching at his alma mater, Rice, Alborn compiled a 13–53 record overall. He was fired after the 1983 season and soon after became defensive line coach for the Houston Gamblers of the United States Football League (USFL). In 1986, Alborn was hired as head coach at Lamar University in Beaumont, Texas. He was released from his contract in 1990 when Lamar chose to discontinue the school's football program. Alborn later served as head coach at Lamar Consolidated High School before retiring in 2002.

On March 2, 2010, Alborn was elected mayor of Ruidoso, New Mexico.

Alborn died on November 4, 2026, at the age of 87.

== Head coaching record ==
=== College ===
Year	Team	Overall	Conference	Standing	Bowl/playoffs
Rice Owls (Southwest Conference) (1978–1983)
1978	Rice	2–9	2–6	8th	
1979	Rice	1–10	0–8	9th	
1980	Rice	5–6	4–4	T–4th	
1981	Rice	4–7	3–5	T–6th	
1982	Rice	0–11	0–8	9th	
1983	Rice	1–10	0–8	9th	
Rice:		13–53	8–40		
Lamar Cardinals (Southland Conference) (1986)
1986	Lamar	2–9	0–5	6th	
Lamar Cardinals (NCAA Division I-AA independent) (1987–1989)
1987	Lamar	3–8			
1988	Lamar	3–8			
1989	Lamar	5–5			
Lamar:		13–30	0–5		
Total:		26–83			

=== High school ===
Year	Team	Overall	Conference	Standing	Bowl/playoffs
Sharpstown Apollos () (1969–1971)
1969	Sharpstown	4–6			
1970	Sharpstown	8–1–1			
1971	Sharpstown	4–5–1			
Sharpstown:		16–12–1			
Lamar Consolidated Mustangs () (1998–2001)
1998	Lamar Consolidated	3–7			
1999	Lamar Consolidated	6–5			
2000	Lamar Consolidated	2–8			
2001	Lamar Consolidated	1–9			
Lamar Consolidated:		12–29			
Total:		28–41–1			
