= 1980 Texas Longhorns football team =

American college football season

1980 Texas Longhorns football

Astro-Bluebonnet Bowl, L 7–16 vs. North Carolina
- Conference: Southwest Conference
- Record: 7–5 (4–4 SWC)
- Head coach: Fred Akers (4th season)
- Offensive coordinator: Leon Manley (4th season)
- Defensive coordinator: Leon Fuller (4th season)
- Home stadium: Texas Memorial Stadium

1980 Southwest Conference football standings
	Conf.					Overall
Team	W		L		T	W		L		T
No. 14 Baylor $	8	–	0	–	0	10	–	2	–	0
No. 20 SMU	5	–	3	–	0	8	–	4	–	0
Houston	5	–	3	–	0	7	–	5	–	0
Texas	4	–	4	–	0	7	–	5	–	0
Rice	4	–	4	–	0	5	–	6	–	0
Arkansas	3	–	5	–	0	7	–	5	–	0
Texas A&M	3	–	5	–	0	4	–	7	–	0
Texas Tech	3	–	5	–	0	5	–	6	–	0
TCU	1	–	7	–	0	1	–	10	–	0
$ – Conference champion; Rankings from AP Poll

The 1980 Texas Longhorns football team represented the University of Texas at Austin in the 1980 NCAA Division I-A football season. The Longhorns finished the regular season with a 7–4 record and lost to North Carolina in the Astro-Bluebonnet Bowl.

== Schedule ==
Date	Time	Opponent	Rank	Site	TV	Result	Attendance	Source
September 1	8:00 p.m.	No. 6 Arkansas	No. 10	Texas Memorial Stadium; Austin, TX (rivalry)	ABC	W 23–17	70,000	
September 20	7:00 p.m.	Utah State*	No. 7	Texas Memorial Stadium; Austin, TX		W 35–17	63,000	
September 27	7:00 p.m.	Oregon State*	No. 7	Texas Memorial Stadium; Austin, TX		W 35–0	60,381	
October 4	7:30 p.m.	at Rice	No. 5	Rice Stadium; Houston, TX (rivalry)		W 41–28	63,163	
October 11	11:30 a.m.	vs. No. 12 Oklahoma*	No. 3	Cotton Bowl; Dallas, TX (rivalry)	ABC	W 20–13	72,032	
October 25	1:00 p.m.	SMU	No. 2	Texas Memorial Stadium; Austin, TX	ABC	L 6–20	73,535	
November 1	2:00 p.m.	at Texas Tech	No. 12	Jones Stadium; Lubbock, TX (rivalry)		L 20–24	50,132	
November 8	1:00 p.m.	Houston		Texas Memorial Stadium; Austin, TX		W 15–13	79,154	
November 15	2:00 p.m.	at TCU		Amon G. Carter Stadium; Fort Worth, TX (rivalry)		W 51–26	20,569	
November 22	2:00 p.m.	at No. 11 Baylor	No. 20	Baylor Stadium; Waco, TX (rivalry)		L 0–16	48,500	
November 29	1:00 p.m.	Texas A&M		Texas Memorial Stadium; Austin, TX (rivalry)		L 14–24	72,537	
December 31	7:00 p.m.	vs. No. 13 North Carolina*		Houston Astrodome; Houston, TX (Astro-Bluebonnet Bowl)	Mizlou	L 7–16	36,669	
*Non-conference game; Rankings from AP Poll released prior to the game; All times are in Central time

== Roster ==
1980 Texas Longhorns football team roster
Players
Coaches
Offense

Pos.	#	Name	Class
C	54	Mike Baab	Jr
QB	1	Donnie Little	Jr
G	79	Terry Tausch	Jr

Defense

Pos.	#	Name	Class
LB	51	Bruce Scholtz	Jr
DE	77	Kenneth Sims	Jr
DE	64	Steve Zander

Special teams

Pos.	#	Name	Class
KR	38	Gary Suttle

Head coach

- Fred Akers

Coordinators/assistant coaches

Legend

- (C) Team captain
- (S) Suspended
- (I) Ineligible
- Injured
- Redshirt
