= 1980 Baylor Bears football team =

American college football season

1980 Baylor Bears football

SWC champion

Cotton Bowl Classic, L 2–30 vs. Alabama
- Conference: Southwest Conference

Ranking
- Coaches: No. 15
- AP: No. 14
- Record: 10–2 (8–0 SWC)
- Head coach: Grant Teaff (9th season)
- Offensive coordinator: John O'Hara (2nd season)
- Co-offensive coordinator: Duke Christian (2nd season)
- Offensive scheme: I formation
- Base defense: 4-3
- Home stadium: Baylor Stadium

1980 Southwest Conference football standings
	Conf.					Overall
Team	W		L		T	W		L		T
No. 14 Baylor $	8	–	0	–	0	10	–	2	–	0
No. 20 SMU	5	–	3	–	0	8	–	4	–	0
Houston	5	–	3	–	0	7	–	5	–	0
Texas	4	–	4	–	0	7	–	5	–	0
Rice	4	–	4	–	0	5	–	6	–	0
Arkansas	3	–	5	–	0	7	–	5	–	0
Texas A&M	3	–	5	–	0	4	–	7	–	0
Texas Tech	3	–	5	–	0	5	–	6	–	0
TCU	1	–	7	–	0	1	–	10	–	0
$ – Conference champion; Rankings from AP Poll

The 1980 Baylor Bears football team represented the Baylor University in the 1980 NCAA Division I-A football season. The Bears finished the season first in the Southwest Conference. During Mike Singletary's senior season of 1980, Baylor won 10 games for the first time in school history. Throughout his Baylor career, Singletary averaged 15 tackles per game. After Baylor's 16–0 victory over Texas in the regular season finale, the Longhorns did not suffer another shutout for 24 years, which was one of the longest non-shutout streaks in college football history.

== Schedule ==
Date	Opponent	Rank	Site	TV	Result	Attendance	Source
September 13	at Lamar*		Cardinal Stadium; Beaumont, TX		W 42–7	18,500	
September 20	West Texas State*		Baylor Stadium; Waco, TX		W 43–15	25,000	
September 27	at Texas Tech		Jones Stadium; Lubbock, TX (rivalry)		W 11–3	48,539	
October 4	Houston	No. 20	Baylor Stadium; Waco, TX (rivalry)		W 24–12	40,000	
October 11	No. 20 SMU	No. 18	Baylor Stadium; Waco, TX		W 32–28	35,000	
October 18	at Texas A&M	No. 13	Kyle Field; College Station, TX (rivalry)		W 46–7	69,735	
October 25	at TCU	No. 11	Amon G. Carter Stadium; Fort Worth, TX (rivalry)		W 21–6	22,385	
November 1	San Jose State*	No. 10	Baylor Stadium; Waco, TX		L 22–30	35,000	
November 8	Arkansas^{†}	No. 16	Baylor Stadium; Waco, TX		W 42–15	46,000	
November 15	at Rice	No. 12	Rice Stadium; Houston, TX		W 16–6	26,000	
November 22	No. 20 Texas	No. 11	Baylor Stadium; Waco, TX (rivalry)		W 16–0	48,500	
January 1	vs. No. 9 Alabama*	No. 6	Cotton Bowl; Dallas, TX (Cotton Bowl Classic)	CBS	L 2–30	74,281	
*Non-conference game; ^{†}Homecoming; Rankings from AP Poll released prior to the game

== Game summaries ==
=== Texas Tech ===
Baylor at Texas Tech

Team	1	2	Total
• Baylor	4	7	11
Texas Tech	0	3	3

- Date: Saturday, September 28
- Location: Jones Stadium, Lubbock, Texas
- Game weather: Rain
- Source: Palm Beach Post

Baylor's first win in Lubbock since 1966.

== Roster ==
1980 Baylor Bears football team roster
Players
Coaches
Offense

Pos.	#	Name	Class
RB	34	Walter Abercrombie	Jr
OT	76	Mark Adickes	So
QB	14	Jay Jeffrey	Jr
QB	7	Mike Brannan	So
TE	80	Raymond Cockrell	Sr
G	60	Frank Ditta	Sr
WR	22	Mike Fisher	Sr
RB	3	Dennis Gentry	Jr
OT	55	Bobby Glass	So
G	66	Eddy Gregory	Sr
WR	17	Robert Holt	Sr
TE	86	Sam Houston	So
C	58	Buzzy Nelson	Jr

Defense

Pos.	#	Name	Class
DL	78	Joe Campbell	Sr
LB	46	Doak Field	Sr
SS	16	Vann McElroy	Jr
LB	63	Mike Singletary	Sr
LB	49	Lester Ward	Sr

Special teams

Pos.	#	Name	Class

Head coach

- Grant Teaff

Coordinators/assistant coaches

Legend

- (C) Team captain
- (S) Suspended
- (I) Ineligible
- Injured
- Redshirt

== Awards and honors ==
- Mike Singletary, (All-America) honors
- Mike Singletary, Davey O'Brien Memorial Trophy, awarded to the most outstanding player in the Southwest Conference.

== Team players drafted into the NFL ==
The following players were drafted into professional football following the season.

Player	Position	Round	Pick	Franchise
Mike Singletary	Linebacker	2	38	Chicago Bears
Robert Holt	Wide receiver	6	161	Buffalo Bills
Doak Field	Linebacker	7	192	Philadelphia Eagles
Mike Fisher	Wide receiver	8	198	St. Louis Cardinals
Frank Ditta	Guard	9	232	Chicago Bears
