= Dale Walters (American football) =

American football player (born 1961)

No. 5
- Position: Punter

Personal information
- Born: June 21, 1961 (age 65); Dighton, Kansas, U.S.
- Listed height: 6 ft 0 in (1.83 m)
- Listed weight: 200 lb (91 kg)

Career information
- High school: Grand Prairie
- College: Rice
- NFL draft: 1984: undrafted

Career history
- Houston Gamblers (1984–1985); Cleveland Browns (1987)
- Stats at Pro Football Reference

Dale Walters (born June 21, 1961) is an American former professional football player who a punter. He played college football for the Rice Owls. Walters played in the United States Football League (USFL) for the Houston Gamblers and was named to league's All-Rookie Team in 1984. He punted in all 18 games for the Gamblers in 1984. Walters was also a member of the 1995 and 1997 USSSA Supreme Softball All-Star Team, earning Honorable Mention both times.
