= Vai Sikahema =

American football player, broadcaster, and religious leader (born 1962)

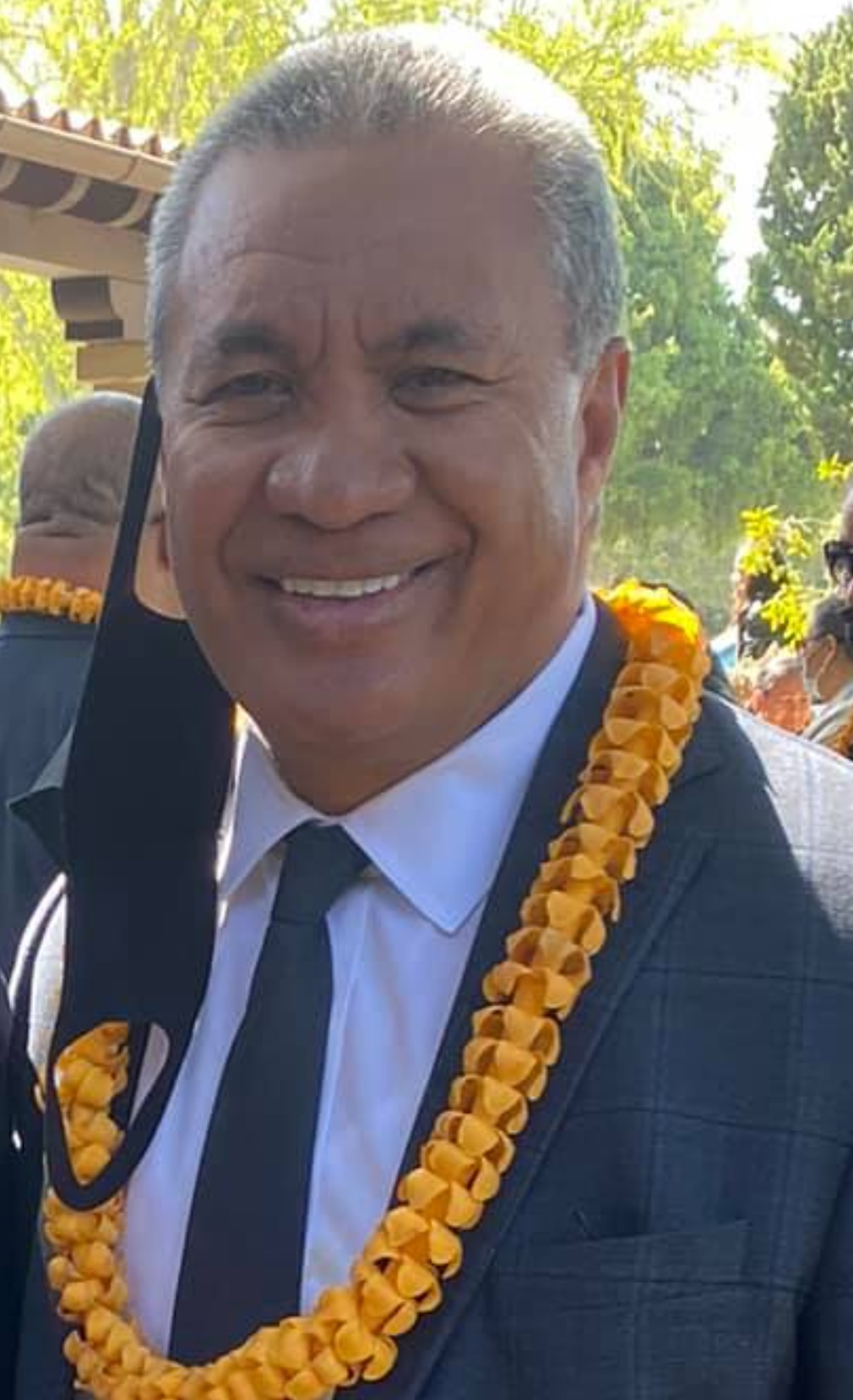

No. 36, 45, 22
- Positions: Running back, return specialist

Personal information
- Born: August 29, 1962 (age 64); Nuku'alofa, Tonga
- Listed height: 5 ft 9 in (1.75 m)
- Listed weight: 181 lb (82 kg)

Career information
- High school: Mesa (Mesa, Arizona, U.S.)
- College: BYU
- NFL draft: 1986: 10th round, 254th overall pick

Career history
- St. Louis/Phoenix Cardinals (1986–1990); Green Bay Packers (1991); Philadelphia Eagles (1992–1993)

Awards and highlights
- 2× Pro Bowl (1986, 1987); First-team All-Pro (1987); Second-team All-Pro (1986); National champion (1984); Polynesian Football Hall of Fame (2016); NCAA (FBS) record: Most career punts returned: 153

Career NFL statistics
- Rushing yards: 217
- Rushing average: 3.7
- Receptions: 53
- Receiving yards: 537
- Return yards: 8,102
- Total touchdowns: 5
- Stats at Pro Football Reference

General Authority Seventy
- April 3, 2021
- Called by: Russell M. Nelson

Personal details
- Children: 4

Vai Sikahema (born 29 August 1962) is a Tongan broadcaster, religious leader, and former professional American football player. He played as a running back and return specialist in the National Football League (NFL). He has served as a general authority seventy of the Church of Jesus Christ of Latter-day Saints (LDS Church) since April 2021.

Sikahema led his high school team in Arizona to the 1979 state championship game. He played college football for the Brigham Young University (BYU) Cougars, and was selected by the St. Louis Cardinals (later the Phoenix Cardinals) in the tenth round of the 1986 NFL draft. He also played for the Green Bay Packers and Philadelphia Eagles before retiring after the 1993 season. The first Tongan ever to play in the NFL, he played for eight seasons from 1986 to 1993. After retiring from the NFL, he served as sports director for NBC 10, the NBC owned-and-operated station in Philadelphia from 1994 to 2020.

== Early life ==
Sikahema was born in Nukuʻalofa, the capital of Tonga. In 1967, when he was 5, the family traveled to New Zealand at great personal expense to be sealed in the New Zealand Temple, an ordinance in the LDS Church. They remained in New Zealand for three months until his father had earned enough money shearing sheep for them to return to Tonga.

His parents later went to the Church College of Hawai'i (now Brigham Young University–Hawaii), leaving Sikahema and his siblings with relatives in Tonga. After a year of working at the Polynesian Cultural Center they had enough money to bring Sikahema to join them. His family later moved to the U.S. state of Arizona, settling in Mesa, a suburb of Phoenix. It was here that they got legal resident status and were eventually able to bring his other siblings to join them. Sikahema attended Mesa High School, where he played football. As a player, he earned all-state honors twice and led his team to the 1979 high school state championship game.

== College career ==
In 1980, Sikahema enrolled at BYU, where he played for the football team. As a freshman, he endeared himself to Cougar fans by returning a punt for a touchdown in BYU's 46–45 come-from-behind victory over SMU in the 1980 Holiday Bowl. He played one more season after that (1981), serving mainly as a return specialist, before leaving school for two years to serve as an LDS Church missionary in South Dakota. Sikahema returned to BYU in 1984. That season, the Cougars posted a perfect 13–0 record, claiming college football's national championship. By the end of his senior year (1985), he held an NCAA record for most punt returns (153) in a career. That season the Washington Post described Sikahema as "single-handedly swinging the momentum BYU's way" in upsetting undefeated fourth-ranked Air Force.

== Professional career ==
Sikahema was drafted in the tenth round by the St. Louis Cardinals in the 1986 NFL Draft, becoming the first Tongan to play in the NFL.

He was a special teams standout for several teams, including the St. Louis/Phoenix Cardinals, Green Bay Packers, and Philadelphia Eagles. In 118 career games over eight seasons from 1986 to 1994, he returned a total of 527 kickoffs or punts, gaining a total of 8,102 yards. Sikahema was named to the Pro Bowl twice (1986 and 1987). It was during his stint with the Eagles that he came up with the famous "goalpost punching" stunt after scoring an 87-yard punt return touchdown in a 1992 game against the New York Giants at Giants Stadium.

== Broadcasting career ==
Upon retiring in 1994, Sikahema was hired by then-CBS owned and operated television station WCAU-TV in Philadelphia to do weekend sports. Surviving the station's sale to NBC, Sikahema later moved to weekdays, becoming a morning news anchor as well as the station's sports director. He worked there for 26 years, before retiring in 2020.

In March 2010, Sikahema joined with The Philadelphia Inquirer sports writer John Gonzalez as the hosts of the Early Midday Show on Philadelphia radio station WPEN-FM 97.5 the Fanatic.

Sikahema was inducted into the Broadcast Pioneers of Philadelphia Hall of Fame on 22 November 2013.

Sikahema has also contributed a column, generally related to religion rather than sports topics, to the Deseret News.

== Personal life ==
Sikahema is an older cousin of fellow Tongan NFL player Deuce Lutui, who played guard for the Arizona Cardinals. Another cousin, Reno Mahe, also played for the Philadelphia Eagles. Sikahema's nephew by marriage is Jon Heder, star of Napoleon Dynamite and Blades of Glory.

In May 2008, Sikahema accepted an open challenge from former baseball player Jose Canseco to fight him in a celebrity boxing match for $25,000. Canseco claims to have earned black belts in Kung Fu, Taekwondo, and has experience in Muay Thai, while Sikahema, who grew up wanting to be a professional boxer, had fought 80 amateur bouts while younger. The Canseco fight was held on 12 July 2008, in Atlantic City at the Bernie Robbins Stadium, and was dubbed The War at The Shore. Sikahema won by knockout in the first round and donated the $5,000 purse to the family of Sergeant Stephen Liczbinski, a Philadelphia Police officer killed in the line of duty.

Sikahema is a member of LDS Church. He has been a resident of Mount Laurel Township, New Jersey together with his wife, the former Keala Heder, and four children. Sikahema served for a year as an area seventy in the LDS Church, until he was sustained as a general authority seventy during the church's April 2021 general conference. He previously served as a stake president from 2014 to 2019, when he was called as an area seventy. Before that he served as a bishop and counselor in the Cherry Hill Stake Presidency. He was a key figure in the negotiations that led to the city approval of the Philadelphia Pennsylvania Temple, being a personal friend of Mayor Michael Nutter.

== Honours ==
National honours

- Order of Queen Sālote Tupou III, Member (31 July 2008).
