= Dusty Mangum =

American football player (born 1983)

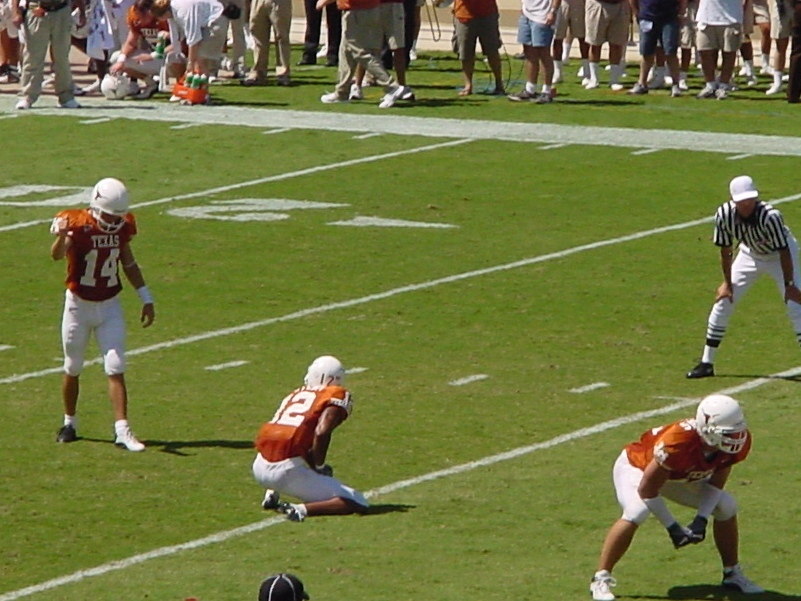
Dusty (#14) kicks an extra point during the 2003 Arkansas Game.

Dustin Ross Mangum (born May 5, 1983) is a former placekicker for the University of Texas at Austin's college football team (The Texas Longhorns) from 2001 to 2004. Mangum, who began his college football career as a walk-on, is best known for capping UT's 2004–2005 season with a 37-yard game-winning field goal as time expired in the 2005 Rose Bowl versus No. 13 University of Michigan. The tipped kick that went in allowed Texas to finish its season as one of the top 5 teams in the nation.

After the game, according to The Daily Texan, President George W. Bush called UT football coach Mack Brown to congratulate him on the win, and to make sure he knew that he watched the entire game, right down to Mangum's last kick.

According to news reports, just before Mangum's kick, Brown told the senior "You're the luckiest human being in the world because your last kick at Texas will win the Rose Bowl." The kick made him an instant state celebrity — he appeared on radio and television programs, was honored by the Mesquite Independent School District, where he is from, and has appeared at autograph signings at Texas bookstores.

Mangum was also on hand at a celebration in the state capitol, along with UT officials, when the Texas Senate passed a resolution honoring the Texas football team for its Rose Bowl win.

Mangum achieved numerous other honors during his time at Texas, though he was not selected in the 2005 NFL draft. Although Mangum was no longer with the Longhorns for their 2005 championship season, his last-second kick foreshadowed the Longhorns second trip to Pasadena, where a sprint by Vince Young into the end-zone in the final minute of play gave Texas back-to-back Rose Bowl wins.

== Accomplishments ==
- Ranks fifth on UT's all-time scoring list with 358 points (third among kickers)
- Ended his senior season as the nation's fourth-leading active career scorer
- Set a UT record with 121 consecutive made PATs (previous: 57, Kris Stockton, 1998–99) and also holds the second place record with 67 straight
- Recorded two of the top 10 scoring seasons on UT record
- Twice named the Big 12 Special Teams Player of the Week
- Two-time honorable mention All-Big 12 Conference pick
- Earned UT's Frank Denius Special Teams Player of the Week eight times
- Hit a 37-yard game-winning FG as time expired to win the Rose Bowl versus No. 13 Michigan – only the fourth time in UT history that a game has been decided as time expired
- Scored a Longhorns freshman-record 102 points (54-of-55 PATs/16-of-23 FGs) in 2001
- Set eight UT freshman records and was an honorable mention All-Big 12 selection

== Media quotes ==
- With one kick off his right foot, Dusty Mangum had settled once and for all the debate over whether Texas deserved to be in the Rose Bowl. (International Herald Tribune—Sports)

== Outside of football ==
Mangum enjoys singing and providing support for student government rallies.
