= Clay Brown (American football) =

American football player (born 1958)

No. 88, 85, 89, 99
- Position: Tight end

Personal information
- Born: September 20, 1958 (age 68); Los Angeles, California, U.S.
- Listed height: 6 ft 3 in (1.91 m)
- Listed weight: 223 lb (101 kg)

Career information
- High school: San Gabriel (CA)
- College: BYU
- NFL draft: 1981: 2nd round, 42nd overall pick

Career history
- Denver Broncos (1981)*; Atlanta Falcons (1982); Denver Broncos (1983); Arizona Wranglers (1984)
- * Offseason or practice squad member only

Awards and highlights
- Second-team All-American (1980)

Career NFL statistics
- Games played: 4
- Stats at Pro Football Reference

Clayton Lee Brown (born September 20, 1958) is an American former professional football player who was a tight end in the National Football League (NFL). Brown played college football for the BYU Cougars and he was selected by the Denver Broncos in the second round of the 1981 NFL draft.
