= Mizlou Television Network =

Former sports broadcast network

- Type: Broadcast television network Cable and internet broadcast
- Country: United States
- Headquarters: Tampa, Florida
- Broadcast area: World Wide
- Parent: Mizlou Communications
- Established: 1968; 58 years ago
- Dissolved: 1991; 35 years ago
- Former names: Unisphere Broadcasting System (1965–1968)

Mizlou Television Network was a sports broadcast television network active from 1968–1991. In 1968, its predecessor, the Unisphere Broadcasting System (UBS) was re-established as Mizlou Television Network, which is now based in Tampa, Florida. Mizlou later branched out into cable sports channels.

== Operation ==
The network was not a full-time network, but produced sports and entertainment television shows offered to a set of affiliates set up event by event. It was seen on affiliates of NBC, ABC, and CBS, and on independent television stations and cable channels.

Mizlou utilized the AT&T system to distribute signals to television stations nationwide via land lines and microwave facilities.

== History ==
=== Unisphere Broadcasting System ===
In mid-1965, radio businessman Vincent C. Piano proposed UBS. The service would have operated 2.5 hours each night. However, Piano had difficulty signing affiliates; a year later, no launch date had been set, and the network still lacked a "respectable number of affiliates in major markets."

=== Mizlou Television Network ===
By 1968, the business changed to Mizlou Television Network. After the name change, Mizlou began syndicating college football bowls in 1968.

Maryland sold Mizlou rights to two of its Atlantic Coast Conference men's basketball games along with the women's basketball Maryland versus Immaculata game on January 26, 1975. This was the first national broadcast of a women’s college basketball game with 100+ stations signing on to the telecast.

Mizlou broadcast the first three Fiesta Bowls starting in 1971, and lost money on the first broadcast. In 1979, the Network broadcast the Miss Black Universe USA and International beauty pageants. The network carried the 1975 Blue-Gray Football Classic, angering the all-star game's committee by convincing the game clock operator to cut three minutes off the clock in the first quarter.

Mizlou was hired by U.S. Tobacco to broadcast the College National Final Rodeo in 1981. In 1985, Mizlou decided not to renew the Holiday Bowl broadcast contract. In 1986, the network signed a three-year deal with the Freedom Bowl adding them to their bowl line up of Bluebonnet, Cherry, Independence and Hall of Fame Bowls for that year.

In August 1989, Mizlou's parent company, Mizlou Communications, announced the November launch of Sports News Network, a 24-hour sports news and interview basic channel. Mizlou in February 1990 made a private placement of securities to keep SNN going. Mizlou made another attempt before July 1990 and attempted a third placement of $15–$20 million in July 1990 for the network. SNN went dark on December 17, 1990 as Mizlou Communications filed for bankruptcy. Mizlou was in talks with Landmark Communications and Telecable Corporation as a potential buyer of the channel and other assets. In January 1991, Landmark dropped plans for a sport news channel and its discussions with Mizlou for the purchases of Sports News Network due to Tele-Communications Inc.'s planned launch of Prime Sports News, an all-sports news cable channel.

== See also ==
- Fourth television network
- Sports Network/Hughes Television Network
- Kaiser Broadcasting Company
- Raycom Sports
