= 1980–81 NCAA football bowl games =

College football postseason game series

- Season: 1980
- Number of bowls: 15
- Bowl games: December 13, 1980 – January 2, 1981
- National Championship: 1981 Sugar Bowl
- Location of Championship: Louisiana Superdome, New Orleans, Louisiana
- Champions: Georgia
Bowl record by conference
Conference	Bowls	Record	Final AP poll

The 1980–81 NCAA football bowl games were a series of post-season games played in December 1980 and January 1981 to end the 1980 NCAA Division I-A football season. A total of 15 team-competitive games, and two all-star games, were played. The post-season began with the Independence Bowl on December 13, 1980, and concluded on January 17, 1981, with the season-ending Senior Bowl.

== Schedule ==
Date	Game	Site	Television	Teams	Affiliations	Results
Dec. 13	Independence Bowl	State Fair Stadium; Shreveport, Louisiana	Mizlou	Southern Miss Golden Eagles (8–3); McNeese State Cowboys (10–1)	Independent; Southland	Southern Miss 16; McNeese State 14
Dec. 14	Garden State Bowl	Giants Stadium; East Rutherford, New Jersey	Mizlou	Houston Cougars (6–5); Navy Midshipmen (8–3)	Southwest; Independent	Houston 35; Navy 0
Dec. 19	Holiday Bowl	Jack Murphy Stadium; San Diego, California	Mizlou	No. 14 BYU Cougars (11–1); No. 19 SMU Mustangs (8–3)	WAC; Southwest	BYU 46; SMU 45
Dec. 20	Tangerine Bowl	Orlando Stadium; Orlando, Florida	Mizlou	Florida Gators (7–4); Maryland Terrapins (8–3)	SEC; ACC	Florida 35; Maryland 20
Dec. 26	Fiesta Bowl	Sun Devil Stadium; Tempe, Arizona	NBC	No. 10 Penn State Nittany Lions (9–2); No. 11 Ohio State Buckeyes (9–2)	Independent; Big Ten	Penn State 31; Ohio State 19
Dec. 27	Hall of Fame Classic	Legion Field; Birmingham, Alabama	Mizlou	Arkansas Razorbacks (6–5); Tulane Green Wave (7–4)	Southwest; Independent	Arkansas 34; Tulane 15
Dec. 27	Sun Bowl	Sun Bowl; El Paso, Texas	CBS	No. 8 Nebraska Cornhuskers (9–2); No. 17 Mississippi State Bulldogs (9–2)	Big 8 SEC	Nebraska 31; Mississippi State 17
Dec. 27	Liberty Bowl	Liberty Bowl Memorial Stadium; Memphis, Tennessee	ABC	No. 16 Purdue Boilermakers (8–3); Missouri Tigers (8–3)	Big Ten; Big 8	Purdue 28; Missouri 25
Dec. 29	Gator Bowl	Gator Bowl Stadium; Jacksonville, Florida	ABC	No. 3 Pittsburgh Panthers (10–1); No. 18 South Carolina Gamecocks (8–3)	Independent; Independent	Pittsburgh 37; South Carolina 9
Dec. 31	Astro-Bluebonnet Bowl	Astrodome; Houston, Texas	Mizlou	No. 13 North Carolina Tar Heels (10–1); Texas Longhorns (7–4)	ACC; Southwest	North Carolina 16; Texas 7
Jan. 1	Cotton Bowl Classic	Cotton Bowl; Dallas, Texas	CBS	No. 9 Alabama Crimson Tide (9–2); No. 6 Baylor Bears (10–1)	SEC; Southwest	Alabama 30; Baylor 2
Jan. 1	Sugar Bowl	Louisiana Superdome; New Orleans, Louisiana	ABC	No. 1 Georgia Bulldogs (11–0); No. 7 Notre Dame Fighting Irish (9–1–1)	SEC; Independent	Georgia 17; Notre Dame 10
Jan. 1	Rose Bowl	Rose Bowl; Pasadena, California	NBC	No. 5 Michigan Wolverines (9–2); No. 16 Washington Huskies (9–2)	Big Ten; Pac 10	Michigan 23; Washington 6
Jan. 1	Orange Bowl	Miami Orange Bowl; Miami, Florida	NBC	No. 4 Oklahoma Sooners (9–2); No. 2 Florida State Seminoles (10–1)	Big 8 Independent	Oklahoma 18; Florida State 17
Jan. 2	Peach Bowl	Fulton County Stadium; Atlanta, Georgia	CBS	No. 20 Miami Hurricanes (8–3); Virginia Tech Gobblers (8–3)	Independent; Independent	Miami 20; Virginia Tech 10

Rankings from AP Poll
