= 1981 Peach Bowl (January) =

American college football game

- 13th Peach Bowl
- Peach Bowl logo
Miami Hurricanes	Virginia Tech Gobblers
(8–3)	(8–3)
Independent	Independent
20	10
Head coach: Howard Schnellenberger	Head coach: Bill Dooley
AP / Coaches; 20 / NR
	1	2	3	4	Total
Miami	7	7	3	3	20
Virginia Tech	0	3	7	0	10
- Date: January 2, 1981
- Season: 1980
- Stadium: Fulton County Stadium
- Location: Atlanta, Georgia
- MVP: Offense: QB Jim Kelly (Miami); Defense: DT Jim Burt (Miami)
- Referee: William Parkinson
- Attendance: 49,252

United States TV coverage
- Network: CBS
- Announcers: Curt Gowdy, Hank Stram, and Frank Glieber

The 1981 Peach Bowl was a post-season American college football bowl game between the Hurricanes from the University of Miami and the Gobblers from the Virginia Polytechnic Institute and State University at Fulton County Stadium in Atlanta, Georgia on January 2, 1981. The game was the final contest of the 1980 NCAA Division I-A football season for both teams, and ended in a 20–10 victory for Miami. Another game by the same name followed the 1981 NCAA Division I-A football season and was played in December, 1981.

Miami finished the regular season with an 8–3 record, including wins over Florida State and Florida. Facing Miami was a familiar post-season opponent-Virginia Tech, whom the Hurricanes had played in the 1966 Liberty Bowl, Tech's last bowl appearance prior to the Peach Bowl. Tech was awarded a bid to the Peach Bowl as a reward for finishing 8–3 during the regular season, a record that included wins over nationally ranked teams such as the Clemson Tigers and the Virginia Cavaliers.

The game kicked off at 3:00 p.m. EST under sunny skies and in temperatures of 46 °F (8 °C). Unlike the 1966 Liberty Bowl, in which Virginia Tech scored first, it was Miami who dominated the game's early going. The Hurricanes scored a touchdown on the first drive of the game and tacked on another touchdown early in the second quarter. Tech was held scoreless in the early going, thanks to two Miami interceptions at the goal line as Virginia Tech was threatening to score. Late in the second quarter, Tech was finally able to get on the scoreboard with a field goal, but at halftime, the Miami Hurricanes led 14–3. After halftime, the Gobblers threatened Miami for the first time all game. Virginia Tech mounted an 80-yard drive that resulted in a touchdown, cutting Miami's lead to 14–10. But the Hurricanes' defense clamped down on any further offensive attempts by Virginia Tech and denied the Gobblers more points. Miami added two field goals: one in the third quarter and one in the fourth quarter that finally put the game out of reach for Virginia Tech. Miami's win was its first bowl victory since the 1966 Liberty Bowl, which also featured a Hurricane victory over Virginia Tech.

== Team selection ==
=== Miami ===
The Miami Hurricanes came into the 1980 college football season after a 5–6 season in 1979 under head coach Howard Schnellenberger. During that season, the team was nicknamed the "Jet Lag Kids" after they traveled an NCAA-record 28,000 miles (45,000 km), including a trip to the Mirage Bowl in Tokyo, Japan. While impressive, the season wasn't as successful as hoped, and Schnellenberger began his second season as coach hoping to improve upon the 5–6 effort despite what was the toughest schedule—in terms of opponents' winning percentage—in the country.

Miami got off to a good start doing just that as it raced out to four consecutive wins to begin the season, including a victory over nationally ranked rival No. 9 Florida State. On October 11, however, Miami traveled to South Bend, Indiana, to face the Notre Dame Fighting Irish and suffered its first loss of the season to the undefeated Irish, who would go on to be ranked No. 1 in the country. This defeat was followed in succession by two others, but the Hurricanes were able to stop the slide on November 8 with a homecoming win over East Carolina. Miami added two more wins before the end of the season, and brought the regular season to a close with an overall record of 8–3.

=== Virginia Tech ===
The Virginia Tech Gobblers, like Miami, entered the 1980 season after accumulating a 5–6 record in 1979. Though the Gobblers traveled far less than Miami, they also hoped to improve upon their losing record. Tech was coached by Bill Dooley, who was entering his third season as head coach.

Like Schnellenberger, he got his team off to a fast start. In the season opener, Tech traveled to North Carolina to face the Wake Forest Demon Deacons. Wake Forest had attended the Tangerine Bowl the previous year and was favored in the game against Tech. Despite those facts, the Gobblers won, 16–7. Virginia Tech won its first four games of the regular season before falling to the nationally ranked Clemson Tigers on October 4. Tech recovered from the loss, defeating Rhode Island, then Virginia before a then-state record crowd of 52,000 people, but lost a second game, to Richmond on October 25. The Gobblers split their final three games of the regular season, winning two and losing one, and finished with a regular season record of 8–3. Tech's 6–0 record at Lane Stadium—its home stadium—was the best in school history. Tech's selection by the Peach Bowl was announced in the locker room following the team's final regular season game. The Peach Bowl representative present was mobbed by celebrating players chanting "Peach Bowl! Peach Bowl!" The representative later said, "I've never seen a wilder celebration."

== Pregame buildup ==
=== Miami offense ===
The Miami Hurricanes entered the Peach Bowl with a record-breaking offense that set the school mark for the most accumulated yards in school history with a total offensive mark of 3,756 yards. Leading the aerial portion of the Miami offense was sophomore quarterback Jim Kelly, who completed 109 of 206 passes for 1,519 yards, 11 touchdowns, and seven interceptions. Kelly's 11 touchdowns tied the Miami record for most touchdowns in a season at that time. Kelly's favorite receiver was wide receiver Larry Brodsky, who caught 33 passes for 570 yards and three touchdowns during the regular season. One of Brodsky's touchdowns came on an 81-yard reception that tied the longest pass reception in the history of Miami football to that point.

The Hurricanes' ground offense was led by running back Smokey Roan, who carried the ball 152 times for 669 yards and five touchdowns. Roan was assisted by an able offensive line. Miami offensive tackle John Canei was named as an honorable mention to the Associated Press All-America team, which recognizes the best college football players in the country.

=== Miami defense ===
Miami's defense shut out one opponent, and held six other opponents to single touchdowns or field goals. Middle guard Jim Burt was one of the Hurricanes' defensive leaders, recovering four fumbles in a single game during the regular season. In recognition of this and other performances, Burt was named to the Associated Press All-America list. Also recognized was defensive back Fred Marion, who was named an honorable mention to the All-America list. Marion intercepted seven passes during the regular season, tying him for second in Miami history for the most interceptions in a season.

=== Virginia Tech offense ===
Throughout the regular season, Virginia Tech's offense was led by running back Cyrus Lawrence, who accumulated what was then a school record of 1,221 yards during the regular season. He also set a record for most carries by a Tech player in a season with 271. Tech quarterback Steve Casey was called the "key man in the Tech offense." Casey was Tech's starting quarterback and completed 97 of 176 passes during the regular season for 1,119 yards and 13 touchdowns. At the time, he ranked second among Tech's career passing leaders, and was considered to be an offensive threat.

Casey's favorite target was wide receiver Sidney Snell, who caught a Tech-record eight touchdown receptions during the regular season. Snell accounted for 568 yards on 43 receptions of all types. Tight end Rob Purdham only caught seven passes during the regular season, but four of the catches were for touchdowns.

=== Virginia Tech defense ===
The Tech defense was ranked among the top five in the country during the regular season, and set a school record for fewest points allowed during an 11-game regular season. Tech permitted just 109 points during the season, and allowed only 11 touchdowns in 11 games.

The leading tackler on the Tech defense was freshman linebacker Ashley Lee, who accumulated 95 tackles during the regular season. Lee was one of two freshman linebackers for the Gobblers during their record-breaking defensive season.

Virginia Tech's defense also featured Robert Brown, who accumulated 10 tackles, including two quarterback sacks, in the Gobblers' regular-season finale against the Virginia Military Institute. Tech head coach Bill Dooley lobbied in vain for Brown's inclusion in the annual All-America list recording the best college football players in the country, saying, "Robert Brown is an All-American football player ... but because he was a transfer student, he received no preseason buildup. ... I guarantee the people who have seen him know he's an All-American." Brown finished the regular season with 61 tackles, broke up four passes, and recovered three fumbles.

== Game summary ==
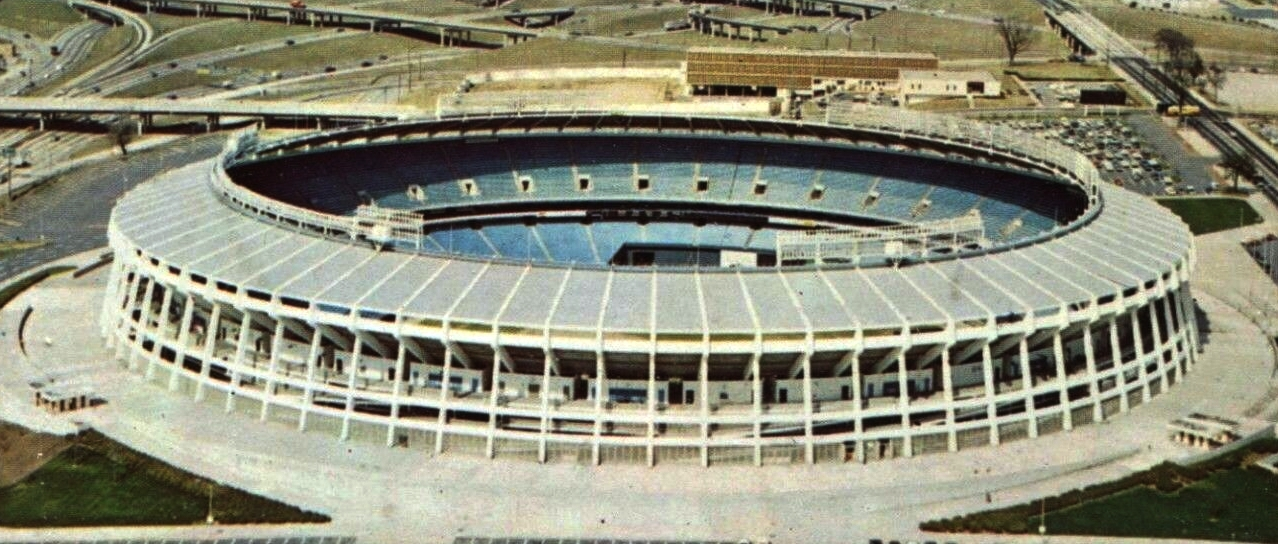
Fulton County Stadium, the site of the game.

The 1981 Peach Bowl kicked off at 3 p.m. EST on January 2, 1981, at Fulton County Stadium in Atlanta, Georgia in front of a crowd estimated at 45,384 people. More than 14,000 of those present were estimated to be fans of Virginia Tech. Weather at kickoff was sunny, with a temperature of 46 °F (8 °C) and a north-northwest wind estimated at 14 miles per hour (23 km/h). The game was televised nationally on CBS, with Curt Gowdy, Hank Stram, and Frank Gleiber serving as the announcers for the television broadcast. William Parkinson was the referee, Robert Aebersold was the umpire, and the linesman was Richard Farina. Miami won the traditional pregame coin toss used to decide first possession and elected to receive the ball to begin the game.

=== First quarter ===
After the Virginia Tech kickoff and a short return, Miami began the first drive of the game at its 32-yard line. The game's first play was an incomplete pass from Miami quarterback Jim Kelly. After a one-yard rush, Kelly completed his first pass of the game, an 18-yard toss that drove Miami to the Tech 49-yard line and gave the Hurricanes a first down. Miami then committed a 15-yard penalty, pushing the Hurricanes back into their side of the field. On the second play after the penalty, Kelly completed a 29-yard pass that gave Miami a first down. The Hurricanes were further aided by a 15-yard roughing the passer penalty against Virginia Tech, giving Miami a first down at the Tech 20-yard line. From there, it took Miami just three plays to score a touchdown, the final play being a 15-yard pass from Kelly to Larry Brodsky. With 12:37 remaining in the quarter, Miami took a 7–0 lead.

Following Miami's post-touchdown kickoff, Virginia Tech began its first offensive possession of the game at its 24-yard line. A three-yard rush from fullback Scott Dovel was followed by two rushes from Tech's Cyrus Lawrence: one for eight yards and a second for 17 more. These drove Tech into Miami territory and gave the Gobblers a first down. Once there, however, Miami's defense stiffened and Tech was forced to punt. Miami recovered the ball at its 12-yard line, and the Hurricanes began their second possession of the game. Fullback Chris Hobbs and running back Smokey Roan alternated carries, picking up yardage and first downs before entering Virginia Tech territory. On the Hurricanes' first play on Tech's side of the field, however, Miami committed two penalties, pushing the Hurricanes back 20 yards. Following the penalties, Miami was unable to pick up a first down and punted back to the Gobblers.

Tech recovered the punt at its 30-yard line and began its second possession. Lawrence rushed for five yards, and Miami committed a five-yard offsides penalty, giving Tech a first down by penalty. Dovel and Lawrence then combined for another first down after two plays. Tech was unable to gain another first down and punted the ball away. Attempting to field the ball, Miami's Fred Marion fumbled the ball, which was recovered by a Tech defender at the Miami 25-yard line. Despite beginning with excellent field position, Tech was unable to score. On the first play after the fumble recovery, Tech attempted to run a trick play involving a pass by Lawrence. The pass was intercepted by a Miami defender at the Hurricanes' one-yard line, and Miami's offense returned to the field.

From their one-yard line, the Hurricanes ran a short rush up the middle, then Kelly connected on a 28-yard pass to tight end Mark Cooper for a first down. Three short rushes by fullback Speedy Neal resulted in 12 yards and a first down. With time running out in the quarter, Kelly attempted and completed a 27-yard pass to wide receiver Rocky Belk, driving the Hurricanes to the Tech 30-yard line and bringing the quarter to an end. Miami led, 7–0 at the end of the first quarter.

=== Second quarter ===
Miami began the second quarter in possession of the ball and facing a first down at the Virginia Tech 30-yard line. From there, it took Miami just four plays to score. Roan ran for seven yards, Kelly completed an 11-yard pass, threw an incomplete pass, then Hobbs ran 12 yards for the touchdown. The score and following extra point gave Miami a 14–0 lead with 13:47 remaining before halftime.

Virginia Tech received the post-touchdown kickoff and was promptly penalized 10 yards for an illegal block during the kickoff. Despite the initial setback, Tech made good the penalty with two passes from quarterback Steve Casey. After gaining one first down, the Gobblers gained several more with a combination of passes from Casey and rushes from Lawrence. Tech drove into Miami territory and penetrated the Hurricanes' red zone, in the process gaining a first down after facing a fourth down near midfield. Attempting to pass for a touchdown, however, Casey threw an interception at the goal line to a Miami defender. The Hurricanes thus again denied Tech a scoring opportunity and the Miami offense began anew.

The Hurricanes picked up a first down on one rush each from Hobbs and Roan, but were unable to gain another. After a Miami punt, Tech returned to offense from its 46-yard line. Casey picked up a first down on a pass, then gained another after a seven-yard scramble that followed a three-yard rush by Lawrence. Lawrence then gained a first down on his own after rushing for nine yards and five yards, driving the Gobblers to the Miami 15-yard line in the process. After entering the Miami red zone, however, Tech was unable to gain a first down and Casey was sacked for a loss of 13 yards. Facing a fourth down and needing 20 yards for a first down, Tech coach Bill Dooley sent in kicker Dennis Laury to attempt a 42-yard field goal. The kick was successful, and with 29 seconds left in the first half, Tech cut Miami's lead to 14–3.

Miami was penalized 15 yards for roughing the kicker during the field goal attempt, allowing Tech to kick off from the Miami 45-yard line following the score. Instead of kicking off to Miami, Tech attempted an onside kick, which would allow Tech to retain possession if the ball was recovered by the kicking team after traveling 10 yards from the point at which it was kicked. The ball did not travel the needed 10 yards, however, and Miami began offense at its 37-yard line, where the ball rolled out of bounds. On Miami's first play after the kick, Kelly attempted a long pass into Tech territory, but the ball was intercepted by Tech's Mike Schamus at the Gobblers' 12-yard line. With just 21 seconds remaining in the first half, Tech attempted to gain quick yardage in an effort to close within field goal distance. Though Lawrence picked up 15 yards and a first with a rush, the Gobblers were unable to enter the Miami side of the field before time expired. At the end of the first half, Miami still held a 14–3 lead.

=== Third quarter ===
Because Miami received the ball to begin the game, Virginia Tech received the ball to begin the second half. After Miami's kickoff and a touchback, Tech began the first possession of the second half at its 20-yard line. The Gobblers picked up a quick first down off a rush each by Lawrence, Dovel, and Casey. Lawrence picked up another with two rushes that resulted in 13 yards and drove the Gobblers to their 44-yard line. There, Casey completed his longest pass of the game – a 42-yard throw to tight end Rob Purdham – that gave Tech a first down at the Miami 14-yard line. Tech continued to drive, picking up short yardage with multiple rushes. The Gobblers suffered a near-disaster when Lawrence fumbled the ball, but Tech retained possession when the ball rolled out of bounds at the one-yard line. Two plays after the fumble, Lawrence vaulted over the goal line for Tech's first and only touchdown of the game. Following the extra point, Tech cut Miami's lead to 14–10 with 8:52 remaining in the quarter.

Following the Tech kickoff, Miami began a drive at its 20-yard line and went three and out. Following the Hurricanes' punt, Tech's offense began work at its 22-yard line. Despite having a chance to take the lead with a successful drive, the Gobblers also went three and out, punting back to Miami and allowing the Hurricanes to begin a possession at their 33-yard line. This possession was more successful than Miami's first of the second half. Kelly ran for four yards, then completed a six-yard pass for a first down. Tech committed a 15-yard grabbing-the-facemask penalty, and Kelly completed a 15-yard pass that pushed the Miami offense to the Tech 22-yard line. Young picked up 12 yards and a first down with a rush to the left, but Kelly was sacked for a loss of 13 yards, negating the gain. Unable to gain another first down or a touchdown, Miami was forced to settle for a field goal attempt. The 31-yard attempt was good, and Miami expanded its lead to 17–10 with 29 seconds remaining in the quarter.

Tech received Miami's kickoff for a touchback, and the Gobblers' offense began work at the Tech 20-yard line. Lawrence ran for six yards, and time ran out in the quarter. With one quarter remaining, Miami held a 17–10 lead.

=== Fourth quarter ===
Tech began the fourth quarter in possession of the ball and facing a second down at its 26-yard line. Despite needing just another four yards for a first down, Tech was unable to gain the needed yardage and was forced to punt. During the kick, Miami was penalized five yards, and began its first possession of the fourth quarter at its 18-yard line after the penalty. Kelly completed an 18-yard pass for a first down, but Miami was unable to gain another. After punting to Tech, the Gobblers were likewise unable to gain a first down and went three and out after committing a delay of game penalty.

Tech's punt was short, and Miami began a possession at the Tech 41-yard line. The Hurricanes picked up a first down with two rushes by Roan for a total of 14 yards. Despite further short gains by Roan, the Hurricanes were stopped short by the Tech defense and were unable to gain another. Miami sent in kicker Dan Miller, who kicked a 37-yard field goal to give Miami a 20–10 lead with 6:27 remaining in the game.

Tech received Miami's post-score kickoff needing to score quickly in order to have a chance to have a second opportunity on offense – needed because Tech was now two scores behind. Tech returned the kickoff to the 24-yard line but were penalized 12 yards for an illegal block. Casey passed for an eight-yard gain and ran for three yards for a first down. After that gain, things went against the Gobblers. Casey was penalized 15 yards for intentional grounding, and Tech was unable to gain another first down. The Gobblers punted, and Miami took over on offense at its 46-yard line. In possession of the lead, Miami began to run out the clock, executing multiple rushing plays in succession in order to force the game clock to continue to count down. Tech's defense forced a stop, but because Miami punted the ball with just 2:20 remaining in the game, there was little chance that Tech would be able to make up the needed two scores.

Tech received the ball at its 16-yard line, and Casey completed a quick 14-yard pass to Purdham for a first down. But Tech was unable to gain another first down, and after four plays were stopped short, Tech turned the ball over to Miami after Casey threw an incomplete pass on fourth down. Miami received the ball with 1:24 remaining and ran a series of inconsequential plays to draw down the clock and bring the game to an end. Miami earned the win, 20–10.

== Statistical summary ==
Statistical comparison
	MIA	VT
1st downs	19	19
Total yards	342	299
Passing yards	179	119
Rushing yards	163	180
Penalties	6–66	7–72
Turnovers	4	2
Time of possession	34:08	25:52

In recognition of their performances during the Peach Bowl, Miami quarterback Jim Kelly and nose guard Jim Burt were named the game's offensive and defensive most valuable players of the game, respectively. Kelly finished the game having completed 11 of his 22 pass attempts for 179 yards, one touchdown, and one interception. Burt, the other MVP, accumulated nine tackles—the second-most of any player in the game—including seven unassisted tackles and one tackle for loss.

Virginia Tech running back Cyrus Lawrence finished the game with 27 carries for 137 rushing yards and a touchdown. The 27 carries remain the most ever recorded by a single Virginia Tech player in a bowl game. Tech quarterback Steve Casey led the Gobblers in passing yardage, completing nine of his 23 pass attempts for 119 yards and one interception.

The Hurricanes' ground offense was led by Smokey Roan, who carried the ball 16 times for 86 yards. Second to Roan for Miami was Chris Hobbs, who contributed 66 yards and a touchdown on 10 carries. Hurricanes wide receiver Larry Brodsky finished with four catches for 80 yards and a touchdown. Miami turned the ball over four times during the course of the game. Tech's 80-yard touchdown drive in the third quarter remains tied for the longest ever recorded by a Tech offense during a bowl game. Conversely, the 99-yard drive allowed to Miami remains the longest scoring drive Tech's defense has ever allowed in a bowl game.

On defense, Virginia Tech linebacker Ashley Lee's 15 tackles remains the most ever recorded by a Tech defender in a bowl game. Three Tech players were tied for second on the team with eight tackles. Behind defensive MVP Burt, Miami had one player with eight tackles and two with seven. Fred Marion, one of the Hurricanes with seven tackles, also intercepted a Tech pass and broke up another pass.

== Postgame effects ==
In exchange for their participation, each team received $663,389. Miami's win brought the Hurricanes to a final record of 9–3 for the 1980 college football season. Likewise, the loss dropped Virginia Tech to a final record of 8–4. Miami's win also was its first bowl-game victory since a similar win over Tech in the 1966 Liberty Bowl.

The 1980 Peach Bowl victory is sometimes cited as the turning point in the Miami football program, as the Hurricanes went 9–2 and 7–4 over the next two season before participating in the 1984 Orange Bowl, the championship game of the 1983 college football season. Tech also participated in a 1984 bowl game; the 1984 Independence Bowl, which followed the 1984 college football season. The Gobblers did not win a bowl game until the 1986 Peach Bowl; however, the game had lasting effects on Virginia Tech's football recruiting efforts. Eventual star players Bruce Smith and Jesse Penn signed letters of intent with Virginia Tech following the game.

Miami had a handful of players selected in the 1981 NFL draft: Cornerback John Swain was picked with the 101st overall selection, Jim Joiner with the 263rd pick, and Pat Walker with the 290th pick. Miami quarterback Jim Kelly, a sophomore during the 1981 Peach Bowl, was selected in the first round of the 1983 NFL draft and went on to become a member of the Pro Football Hall of Fame in recognition of his performance during 10 seasons with the Buffalo Bills. In 2002, Kelly was named to the Peach Bowl Hall of Fame in honor of his performance in the 1980 game.

== Later aftermath ==
Miami and Virginia Tech would both be charter members of the Big East Conference's football league in 1991, and in 2004, both schools moved to the Atlantic Coast Conference – which had a tie-in with the bowl through 2013.

== See also ==
- Miami–Virginia Tech football rivalry
