= 1980 North Carolina Tar Heels football team =

American college football season

1980 North Carolina Tar Heels football

ACC champion Astro-Bluebonnet Bowl champion

Astro–Bluebonnet Bowl, W 16–7 vs. Texas
- Conference: Atlantic Coast Conference

Ranking
- Coaches: No. 9
- AP: No. 10
- Record: 11–1 (6–0 ACC)
- Head coach: Dick Crum (3rd season)
- Captains: Rick Donnalley; Steve Streater; Lawrence Taylor; Ron Wooten
- Home stadium: Kenan Memorial Stadium

1980 Atlantic Coast Conference football standings
	Conf.					Overall
Team	W		L		T	W		L		T
No. 10 North Carolina $	6	–	0	–	0	11	–	1	–	0
Maryland	5	–	1	–	0	8	–	4	–	0
NC State	3	–	3	–	0	6	–	5	–	0
Clemson	2	–	4	–	0	6	–	5	–	0
Wake Forest	2	–	4	–	0	5	–	6	–	0
Virginia	2	–	4	–	0	4	–	7	–	0
Duke	1	–	5	–	0	2	–	9	–	0
$ – Conference champion; Rankings from AP Poll

The 1980 North Carolina Tar Heels football team was an American football team that represented the University of North Carolina at Chapel Hill as a member of the Atlantic Coast Conference (ACC) during the 1980 NCAA Division I-A football season. In their third year under head coach Dick Crum, the Tar Heels compiled an 11–1 record (6–0 in conference games), kept six opponents from scoring a touchdown, and outscored all opponents by a total of 281 to 123. They won the ACC championship, were ranked No. 10 in the final AP poll, and defeated Texas in the Astro–Bluebonnet Bowl. The 11 wins tied a program record set during the 1972 season.

Senior linebacker Lawrence Taylor had 16 sacks, was a consensus selection on the 1980 All-America college football team and won ACC player of the year honors. Crum was named ACC coach of the year.

The team had two backs who gained over 1,000 rushing yards: Amos Lawrence (1,118 yards, 90 points) and Kelvin Bryant (1,039 yards, 72 points). Quarterback Rod Elkins led the team with 1,002 passing yards.

The team played its home games at Kenan Memorial Stadium in Chapel Hill, North Carolina.

== Schedule ==
Date	Time	Opponent	Rank	Site	TV	Result	Attendance	Source
September 6	1:00 p.m.	Furman*	No. 14	Kenan Memorial Stadium; Chapel Hill, NC		W 35–13	50,100	
September 13	8:30 p.m.	at Texas Tech*	No. 15	Jones Stadium; Lubbock, TX		W 9–3	37,797	
September 27	1:00 p.m.	No. 19 Maryland	No. 14	Kenan Memorial Stadium; Chapel Hill, NC		W 17–3	51,400	
October 4	1:00 p.m.	Georgia Tech*	No. 10	Kenan Memorial Stadium; Chapel Hill, NC		W 33–0	49,750	
October 11	1:00 p.m.	at Wake Forest	No. 8	Groves Stadium; Winston-Salem, NC (rivalry)		W 27–9	37,411	
October 18	1:00 p.m.	NC State	No. 8	Kenan Memorial Stadium; Chapel Hill, NC (rivalry)		W 28–8	51,845	
October 25	1:00 p.m.	East Carolina*	No. 7	Kenan Memorial Stadium; Chapel Hill, NC		W 31–3	48,100	
November 1	2:30 p.m.	at No. 16 Oklahoma*	No. 6	Oklahoma Memorial Stadium; Norman, OK	ESPN	L 7–41	74,852	
November 8	1:00 p.m.	at Clemson	No. 14	Memorial Stadium; Clemson, SC		W 24–19	62,500	
November 15	1:00 p.m.	Virginia	No. 15	Kenan Memorial Stadium; Chapel Hill, NC (South's Oldest Rivalry)		W 26–3	49,500	
November 22	1:00 p.m.	Duke	No. 15	Kenan Memorial Stadium; Chapel Hill, NC (Victory Bell)		W 44–21	51,389	
December 31	8:00 p.m.	vs. Texas*	No. 13	Astrodome; Houston, TX (Astro–Bluebonnet Bowl)	Mizlou	W 16–7	36,669	
*Non-conference game; Rankings from AP Poll released prior to the game; All times are in Eastern time

== Rankings ==
Ranking movements Legend: ██ Increase in ranking ██ Decrease in ranking
	Week															
Poll	Pre	1	2	3	4	5	6	7	8	9	10	11	12	13	14	Final
AP	14	15	13	14	10	8	8	7	6	14	15	15	13	12	13	10
Coaches	17	13	13	15	11	8	8	7	6	14	15	13	11	11	11	9

== Game summaries ==
=== Vs. Texas (Astro-Bluebonnet Bowl) ===
North Carolina vs. Texas

Team	1	2	3	4	Total
• Tar Heels	6	7	3	0	16
Longhorns	0	7	0	0	7

- Date: December 31
- Location: Astrodome, Houston, Texas
- Game attendance: 36,669
- Referee: Jim Harper, Jr.
- TV announcers (Mizlou): Ray Scott, John Unitas, and Howard David

== Roster ==
1980 North Carolina Tar Heels football team roster
Players
Coaches
Offense

Pos.	#	Name	Class
RB	1	Travis Freeman	Sr
FB	1	Billy "Freight Train" Johnson	Sr
QB	10	Rod Elkins	So
WR	19	Jon Richardson	Jr
WR	41	Wayne Tucker	Sr
RB	20	Amos Lawrence	Sr
C	51	Rick Donnalley	Sr
OT	54	Dave Drechsler	So
G	78	Ron Wooten	Sr
OL		Kevin Wilson	Fr
WR	85	Mike McCormick	Sr

Defense

Pos.	#	Name	Class
FS	5	Steve Streater	Sr
SS	28	Bill Jackson	Jr
LB	29	Darrell Nicholson	Jr
NG	34	Paul Davis	Sr
DT	76	Donnell Thompson	Sr
OLB	84	Mike Wilcher	So
OLB	93	Calvin Daniels	Jr
OLB	98	Lawrence Taylor	Sr
DB	unk	Larry Winters	So

Special teams

Pos.	#	Name	Class
P	5	Steve Streater	Sr

Head coach

- Dick Crum

Coordinators/assistant coaches

Denny Marcin, Larry Marmie, Cleve Bryant

Legend

- (C) Team captain
- (S) Suspended
- (I) Ineligible
- Injured
- Redshirt

Roster

== Statistics ==
The Tar Heels gained an average of 297.7 rushing yards and 104.1 passing yards per game. On defense, they gave up 138.0 rushing yards and 144.1 passing yards per game.

Two North Carolina backs tallied over 1,000 rushing yards:

- Amos Lawrence tallied 1,118 rushing yards on 229 carries for an average of 4.9 yards per carry. He also caught nine passes for 80 yards and led the team in scoring with 90 points on 15 touchdowns.
- Kelvin Bryant gained 1,039 rushing yards on 177 carries for an average of 5.9 yards per carry. He also caught 12 passes for 194 yards and scored 72 points on 12 touchdowns.

Billy Johnson ranked third with 433 yards on 103 carries for a 4.2 yard average.

Quarterback Rod Elkins completed 181 of 160 passes (50.6%) for 1,002 yards with 11 touchdowns, nine interceptins, and a 114.7 quarterback rating. The team's leading receivers were Mike Chatham (20 receptions, 239 yards), Victor Harrison (16 receptions, 210 yards), Jon Richardson (15 receptions, 206 yards), and Kelvin Bryant (12 receptions, 194 yards).

== Awards and honors ==
Linebacker Lawrence Taylor won the award as the Atlantic Coast Conference player of the year.

Three North Carolina players received All-America honors. Taylor was a consensus pick, receiving first-team honors from the American Football Coaches Association (AFCA), Associated Press (AP), Football Writers Association of America (FWAA), and United Press International (UPI). Guard Ron Wooten received first-team honors from the Newspaper Enterprise Association (NEA) and the Walter Camp Football Foundation (WCFF), second-team honors from the UPI, and third-team honors from the AP. Center Rick Donnalley received second-team honors from the AP.

Eight North Carolina players received first-team honors on the 1980 All-Atlantic Coast Conference football team: guard Ron Wooten; center Rick Donnalley; running backs Amos Lawrence and Kelvin Bryant; Lawrence Taylor (at defensive line); linebacker Darrell Nicholson; Steve Streater (honored both as defensive back and punter).

== 1981 NFL draft ==
The following players were drafted into professional football following the season.

Player	Position	Round	Pick	Franchise
Lawrence Taylor	Linebacker	1	2	New York Giants
Donnell Thompson	Defensive tackle	1	18	Baltimore Colts
Rick Donnalley	Center	3	73	Pittsburgh Steelers
Amos Lawrence	Running back	4	103	San Diego Chargers
Ron Wooten	Guard	6	157	New England Patriots
Harry Stanback	Defensive tackle	6	164	Atlanta Falcons
