= 1980 Tangerine Bowl =

American college football game

Maryland Terrapins	Florida Gators
(8–3)	(7–4)
ACC	SEC
20	35
Head coach: Jerry Claiborne	Head coach: Charley Pell
AP / Coaches; NR / 20
	1	2	3	4	Total
Maryland	3	6	11	0	20
Florida	0	14	14	7	35
- Date: December 20, 1980
- Season: 1980
- Stadium: Orlando Stadium
- Location: Orlando, Florida
- MVP: Cris Collinsworth, Florida (overall); Charlie Wysocki, Maryland (offensive); David Galloway, Florida (defensive)
- Referee: Bob Bertha
- Attendance: 52,541

United States TV coverage
- Network: Mizlou

The 1980 Tangerine Bowl was an American college football bowl game played on December 20, 1980 at Orlando Stadium in Orlando, Florida. The game pitted the Florida Gators and the Maryland Terrapins.

== Background ==
The Terrapins improved upon their record, rising from 7 to 8 victories, though they once again finished 2nd place in the Atlantic Coast Conference, this time to North Carolina, who were invited to the Astro-Bluebonnet Bowl. As such, Maryland was invited to the Tangerine Bowl for the first time ever. This was their seventh bowl game in eight seasons. Florida had finished the previous season, Charley Pell's first as head coach, 0–10–1 and plagued with injuries, the worst season in Gator history. But the Gators rebounded in 1980, winning eight games (with a 4–2 conference record), including two close losses to eventual national champion Georgia and #3 Florida State (by a combined total of nine points) to finish 3rd in the Southeastern Conference, with five weeks spent in the polls, though three losses in their last four games had dropped them from #20 to unranked. This was their first bowl appearance since 1977 and fifth in seven years. The two teams had previously met in the Gator Bowl five years previously, which Maryland had won 13–0.

Florida's vast improvement over their winless previous season was due largely in part to much improved quarterback play. Freshman Wayne Peace finished second in the Southeastern Conference in passing efficiency, and sophomore Bob Hewko was also effective in limited play. The offense also featured future NFL starters in wide receiver Cris Collinsworth and running back James Jones. The defense was anchored by future NFL defensive tackle David Galloway.

== Game summary ==
1st Quarter

- Maryland - Dale Castro 34-yard field goal, 4:50

2nd Quarter

- Florida - Cris Collinsworth 24-yard touchdown pass from Wayne Peace (Brian Clark kick), 14:04
- Maryland - Dale Castro 27-yard field goal, 9:00
- Maryland - Dale Castro 26-yard field goal, 4:28
- Florida - James Jones 2-yard touchdown run (Brian Clark kick), 1:46

3rd Quarter

- Maryland - Charlie Wysocki 2-yard touchdown run (Mike Tice run), 14:48
- Maryland - Dale Castro 42-yard field goal, 10:00
- Florida - Wayne Peace 1-yard touchdown run (Brian Clark kick), 4:43
- Florida - Cris Collinsworth 21-yard touchdown pass from Wayne Peace (Brian Clark kick), 3:29

4th Quarter

- Florida - Johnell Brown 2-yard touchdown run (Brian Clark kick), 9:31

Maryland had 181 rushing yards and 155 passing yards while Florida had 108 rushing yards and 271 passing yards, though Maryland turned the ball over five times as opposed to Florida's one turnover. For Florida, Peace threw 20-of-34 for 271 yards and two touchdowns, while contributing a touchdown plunge of his own. Cris Collinsworth caught eight passes for 166 yards and two touchdowns while being named MVP. For Maryland, Mike Tice threw 11-of-23 for 129 yards for three interceptions. Charlie Wysocki ran for 159 yards on 39 carries and one touchdown.

== Aftermath ==
The Terrapins reached four more bowl games in the decade, including the newly renamed Florida Citrus Bowl in 1983. Florida reached six more bowl games in the decade, though they did not reach the Citrus Bowl again until 1998.
