= The New York Times College Football Rankings =

The New York Times College Football Rankings were a weekly ranking of college football teams by The New York Times.

The New York Times computer rankings are counted by the NCAA as a "major selector" of national championships in college football. The rankings were one of the computer rankings included in the Bowl Championship Series rankings.

== Results ==
Season	Champion	Record
1979	Alabama	12–0
1980	Pittsburgh	11–1
1982	Penn State	11–1
1983	Auburn	11–1
1984	Florida	9–1–1
