= 1980 NC State Wolfpack football team =

American college football season

1980 NC State Wolfpack football
- Conference: Atlantic Coast Conference
- Record: 6–5 (3–3 ACC)
- Head coach: Monte Kiffin (1st season)
- Home stadium: Carter Stadium

1980 Atlantic Coast Conference football standings
	Conf.					Overall
Team	W		L		T	W		L		T
No. 10 North Carolina $	6	–	0	–	0	11	–	1	–	0
Maryland	5	–	1	–	0	8	–	4	–	0
NC State	3	–	3	–	0	6	–	5	–	0
Clemson	2	–	4	–	0	6	–	5	–	0
Wake Forest	2	–	4	–	0	5	–	6	–	0
Virginia	2	–	4	–	0	4	–	7	–	0
Duke	1	–	5	–	0	2	–	9	–	0
$ – Conference champion; Rankings from AP Poll

The 1980 NC State Wolfpack football team represented North Carolina State University during the 1980 NCAA Division I-A football season. The team's head coach was Monte Kiffin. NC State has been a member of the Atlantic Coast Conference (ACC) since the league's inception in 1953. The Wolfpack played its home games in 1980 at Carter–Finley Stadium in Raleigh, North Carolina, which has been NC State football's home stadium since 1966.

== Schedule ==
Date	Opponent	Site	Result	Attendance	Source
September 6	William & Mary*	Carter–Finley Stadium; Raleigh, NC	W 42–0	44,500	
September 20	at Virginia	Scott Stadium; Charlottesville, VA	W 27–13	30,072	
September 27	Wake Forest	Carter–Finley Stadium; Raleigh, NC (rivalry)	L 7–27	47,800	
October 4	at No. 18 South Carolina*	Williams–Brice Stadium; Columbia, SC	L 10–30	56,581	
October 11	Appalachian State*	Carter–Finley Stadium; Raleigh, NC	W 17–14	41,800	
October 18	at No. 8 North Carolina	Kenan Memorial Stadium; Chapel Hill, NC (rivalry)	L 8–28	51,400	
October 25	Clemson	Carter–Finley Stadium; Raleigh, NC (rivalry)	W 24–20	44,400	
November 1	at Maryland	Byrd Stadium; College Park, MD	L 0–24	40,016	
November 8	at No. 10 Penn State*	Beaver Stadium; University Park, PA	L 13–21	83,847	
November 15	Duke	Carter–Finley Stadium; Raleigh, NC (rivalry)	W 38–21	42,800	
November 22	East Carolina*	Carter–Finley Stadium; Raleigh, NC (rivalry)	W 36–14	46,200	
*Non-conference game; Rankings from AP Poll released prior to the game
