= 1980 Wake Forest Demon Deacons football team =

American college football season

1980 Wake Forest Demon Deacons football
- Conference: Atlantic Coast Conference
- Record: 5–6 (2–4 ACC)
- Head coach: John Mackovic (3rd season)
- Offensive coordinator: Ed Zaunbrecher (1st season)
- Captains: Bill Ard; Carlos Bradley; Jay Venuto
- Home stadium: Groves Stadium

1980 Atlantic Coast Conference football standings
	Conf.					Overall
Team	W		L		T	W		L		T
No. 10 North Carolina $	6	–	0	–	0	11	–	1	–	0
Maryland	5	–	1	–	0	8	–	4	–	0
NC State	3	–	3	–	0	6	–	5	–	0
Clemson	2	–	4	–	0	6	–	5	–	0
Wake Forest	2	–	4	–	0	5	–	6	–	0
Virginia	2	–	4	–	0	4	–	7	–	0
Duke	1	–	5	–	0	2	–	9	–	0
$ – Conference champion; Rankings from AP Poll

The 1980 Wake Forest Demon Deacons football team was an American football team that represented Wake Forest University during the 1980 NCAA Division I-A football season. In its third season under head coach John Mackovic, the team compiled a 5–6 record and finished in a three-way tie for fourth place in the Atlantic Coast Conference.

== Schedule ==
Date	Opponent	Site	Result	Attendance	Source
September 6	Virginia Tech*	Groves Stadium; Winston-Salem, NC	L 7–18	24,500	
September 20	The Citadel*	Groves Stadium; Winston-Salem, NC	W 24–7	22,500	
September 27	at NC State	Carter–Finley Stadium; Raleigh, NC (rivalry)	W 27–7	47,800	
October 4	at William & Mary*	Cary Field; Williamsburg, VA	W 27–7	15,800	
October 11	No. 8 North Carolina	Groves Stadium; Winston-Salem, NC (rivalry)	L 9–27	37,411	
October 18	at Maryland	Byrd Stadium; College Park, MD	L 10–11	36,472	
October 25	Virginia	Groves Stadium; Winston-Salem, NC	L 21–24	23,300	
November 1	Clemson	Groves Stadium; Winston-Salem, NC	L 33–35	28,200	
November 8	at Duke	Wallace Wade Stadium; Durham, NC (rivalry)	W 27–24	23,000	
November 15	at No. 14 South Carolina*	Williams–Brice Stadium; Columbia, SC	L 38–39	55,583	
November 22	Appalachian State*	Groves Stadium; Winston-Salem, NC	W 28–16	23,000	
*Non-conference game; Rankings from AP Poll released prior to the game

== Roster ==
1980 Wake Forest Demon Deacons football team roster
Players
Coaches
Offense

Pos.	#	Name	Class
WR	1	Kenny Duckett	Jr
QB	10	Gary Suchofield	Fr
QB	14	Jay Venuto	Sr
RB	23	Wayne McMillan
TE	49	Jimmy Hargrove	Sr
WR	88	Tim Ryan

Defense

Pos.	#	Name	Class

Special teams

Pos.	#	Name	Class

Head coach

- John Mackovic

Coordinators/assistant coaches

Legend

- (C) Team captain
- (S) Suspended
- (I) Ineligible
- Injured
- Redshirt

== Team leaders ==
Category	Team Leader	Att/Cth	Yds
Passing	Jay Venuto	214/413	2,624
Rushing	Wayne McMillan	152	694
Receiving	Kenny Duckett	50	656
