= 1980 North Texas State Mean Green football team =

American college football season

1980 North Texas State Mean Green football
- Conference: Independent
- Record: 6–5
- Head coach: Jerry Moore (2nd season)
- Offensive scheme: I formation
- Home stadium: Fouts Field

1980 NCAA Division I-A independents football records
| | Conf. | | | | | Overall |
| Team | W | | L | | T | W | | L | | T |
|---|---|---|---|---|---|---|---|---|---|---|
| No. 2 Pittsburgh | | – | | – | | 11 | – | 1 | – | 0 |
| Tennessee State | | – | | – | | 9 | – | 1 | – | 0 |
| No. 5 Florida State | | – | | – | | 10 | – | 2 | – | 0 |
| No. 8 Penn State | | – | | – | | 10 | – | 2 | – | 0 |
| No. 9 Notre Dame | | – | | – | | 9 | – | 2 | – | 1 |
| No. 18 Miami (FL) | | – | | – | | 9 | – | 3 | – | 0 |
| Southern Miss | | – | | – | | 9 | – | 3 | – | 0 |
| Navy | | – | | – | | 8 | – | 4 | – | 0 |
| South Carolina | | – | | – | | 8 | – | 4 | – | 0 |
| Virginia Tech | | – | | – | | 8 | – | 4 | – | 0 |
| Boston College | | – | | – | | 7 | – | 4 | – | 0 |
| Northeast Louisiana | | – | | – | | 7 | – | 4 | – | 0 |
| Rutgers | | – | | – | | 7 | – | 4 | – | 0 |
| UNLV | | – | | – | | 7 | – | 4 | – | 0 |
| Tulane | | – | | – | | 7 | – | 5 | – | 0 |
| Colgate | | – | | – | | 5 | – | 4 | – | 1 |
| North Texas State | | – | | – | | 6 | – | 5 | – | 0 |
| Villanova | | – | | – | | 6 | – | 5 | – | 0 |
| West Virginia | | – | | – | | 6 | – | 6 | – | 0 |
| Louisville | | – | | – | | 5 | – | 6 | – | 0 |
| Richmond | | – | | – | | 5 | – | 6 | – | 0 |
| Syracuse | | – | | – | | 5 | – | 6 | – | 0 |
| East Carolina | | – | | – | | 4 | – | 7 | – | 0 |
| Illinois State | | – | | – | | 4 | – | 7 | – | 0 |
| Temple | | – | | – | | 4 | – | 7 | – | 0 |
| Army | | – | | – | | 3 | – | 7 | – | 1 |
| Holy Cross | | – | | – | | 3 | – | 8 | – | 0 |
| Cincinnati | | – | | – | | 2 | – | 9 | – | 0 |
| Memphis State | | – | | – | | 2 | – | 9 | – | 0 |
| William & Mary | | – | | – | | 2 | – | 9 | – | 0 |
| Georgia Tech | | – | | – | | 1 | – | 9 | – | 1 |
Rankings from AP Poll

The 1980 North Texas State Mean Green football team was an American football team that represented North Texas State University (now known as the University of North Texas) as an independent during the 1980 NCAA Division I-A football season as an independent. In their second year under head coach Jerry Moore, the team compiled a 6–5 record.

== Schedule ==
| Date | Opponent | Site | Result | Attendance | Source |
|---|---|---|---|---|---|
| September 6 | at UT Arlington | Maverick Stadium; Arlington, TX | W 31–14 | 18,033 | |
| September 13 | at SMU | Texas Stadium; Irving, TX | L 9–28 | 52,781 | |
| September 20 | at UTEP | Sun Bowl; El Paso, TX | W 35–15 | 20,350 | |
| September 27 | at Houston | Houston Astrodome; Houston, TX | L 20–24 | 23,672 | |
| October 4 | Southwestern Louisiana | Fouts Field; Denton, TX | W 22–20 | | |
| October 11 | at Tulsa | Skelly Stadium; Tulsa, OK | L 27–28 | 18,315 | |
| October 18 | at Memphis State | Liberty Bowl Memorial Stadium; Memphis, TN | W 29–10 | | |
| November 1 | at New Mexico State | Aggie Memorial Stadium; Las Cruces, NM | W 38–28 | | |
| November 8 | at No. 13 BYU | Cougar Stadium; Provo, UT | L 23–41 | 36,583 | |
| November 15 | Northeast Louisiana^{†} | Fouts Field; Denton, TX | W 26–18 | | |
| November 22 | at Miami (FL) | Miami Orange Bowl; Miami, FL | L 8–26 | 20,293 | |
^{†}Homecoming; Rankings from AP Poll released prior to the game
