= Dick Crum (American football) =

American football player and coach (born 1934)

Biographical details
- Born: April 29, 1934 (age 92); Boardman Township, Mahoning County, Ohio

Playing career
- 1950s: Mount Union

Coaching career (HC unless noted)
- 1963–1968: Mentor HS (OH)
- 1969–1973: Miami (OH) (assistant)
- 1974–1977: Miami (OH)
- 1978–1987: North Carolina
- 1988–1990: Kent State

Head coaching record
- Overall: 113–77–4 (college); 50–9–1 (high school)
- Bowls: 6–2

Accomplishments and honors

Championships
- 3 MAC (1974–1975, 1977); 1 ACC (1980)

Awards
- MAC Coach of the Year (1974); ACC Coach of the Year (1980)

Dick Crum (born April 29, 1934) is an American former football player and coach. He served as head football coach at Miami University from 1974 to 1977, the University of North Carolina at Chapel Hill from 1978 to 1987, and Kent State University from 1988 to 1990, compiling a career college football head coaching record of 113–77–4. Crum is a 1957 graduate of Mount Union College in Alliance, Ohio and received a master's degree from Case Western Reserve University.

== Early years ==
Crum was born in Boardman. He attended Boardman High School Crum played football, mostly as a backup, at both Muskingum College and Mount Union College before graduating from the latter in 1957. After graduation, Crum was a teacher and assistant football coach at several high schools in Ohio, including Boardman, Sandusky, and Warren Harding. Crum's first head coaching job was at Mentor High School in 1963 where he compiled a 50–9–1 record over six years. He moved to the college ranks in 1969 when he was hired as an assistant coach by Bill Mallory at Miami University.

== College head coach ==
=== Miami of Ohio ===
When Mallory left for Colorado in 1974, Crum succeeded him as head coach at Miami, a post he held until 1977. He orchestrated several upset wins including victories over Kentucky in 1974, Purdue in 1975, and Indiana in 1977. Crum had three winning seasons in four years and won the Mid-American Conference three times. In his first two years, he led the Miami to the Tangerine Bowl twice, where they beat Georgia in 1974 and South Carolina in 1975. Those two Miami teams ranked in the final AP Poll at No. 10 in 1974 and No. 12 in 1975. In 1976, Miami's performance fell dramatically with a 3–8 finish. The team rebounded the next year with a 10–1 record. After the 1977 season, Crum accepted the head coaching position at North Carolina and was replaced by Tom Reed. During his four years at Miami, Crum developed future NFL standouts Rob Carpenter and Sherman Smith, future Miami and Northwestern head coach Randy Walker, and former Illinois head coach Ron Zook. Crum finished his stint at Miami with a record of 34–10–1.

=== North Carolina ===
Crum was hired as head coach at the University of North Carolina at Chapel Hill in 1978, succeeding Bill Dooley. His finest season there came in 1980 when he led the Tar Heels to the Atlantic Coast Conference championship—their last conference title to date—and an 11–1 record capped by victory over Texas in the Bluebonnet Bowl. At North Carolina, Crum coached a number of future NFL players, including Lawrence Taylor, Harris Barton, Reuben Davis and Kelvin Bryant.

Crum's later North Carolina teams were not quite as talented as his earlier ones; after 1983 he would have only one winning season. He was fired at the end of the 1987 season and was succeeded by Mack Brown. Crum finished his career at North Carolina with a record of 72–41–3, though he only won 22 games in his final four seasons. He was the winningest coach in school history until Mack Brown (in his second tenure at North Carolina) surpassed him after a game against Duke in 2019.

=== Kent State ===
Crum served as the head coach at Kent State University from 1988 to 1990. He never put together a winning season in three years with the Golden Flashes and compiled a record of 7–26.

== Head coaching record ==
=== College ===
Year	Team	Overall	Conference	Standing	Bowl/playoffs	Coaches^{#}	AP^{°}
Miami Redskins (Mid-American Conference) (1974–1977)
1974	Miami	10–0–1	5–0	1st	W Tangerine	10	10
1975	Miami	11–1	6–0	1st	W Tangerine	16	12
1976	Miami	3–8	2–4	7th			
1977	Miami	10–1	5–0	1st			
Miami:		34–10–1	18–4				
North Carolina Tar Heels (Atlantic Coast Conference) (1978–1987)
1978	North Carolina	5–6	3–3	4th			
1979	North Carolina	8–3–1	3–3	5th	W Gator	14	15
1980	North Carolina	11–1	6–0	1st	W Astro-Bluebonnet	9	10
1981	North Carolina	10–2	5–1	2nd	W Gator	8	9
1982	North Carolina	8–4	3–3	T–3rd	W Sun	13	18
1983	North Carolina	8–4	4–2	2nd	L Peach		
1984	North Carolina	5–5–1	3–2–1	3rd			
1985	North Carolina	5–6	3–4	5th			
1986	North Carolina	7–4–1	5–2	2nd	L Aloha		
1987	North Carolina	5–6	3–4	6th			
North Carolina:		72–41–3	38–24–1				
Kent State Golden Flashes (Mid-American Conference) (1988–1990)
1988	Kent State	5–6	3–5	7th			
1989	Kent State	0–11	0–8	9th			
1990	Kent State	2–9	2–6	T–7th			
Kent State:		7–26	5–19				
Total:		113–77–4					
National championship Conference title Conference division title or championship game berth
^{#}Rankings from final Coaches Poll.; ^{°}Rankings from final AP Poll.
