= 1980 Duke Blue Devils football team =

American college football season

1980 Duke Blue Devils football
- Conference: Atlantic Coast Conference
- Record: 2–9 (1–5 ACC)
- Head coach: Shirley Wilson (2nd season)
- Offensive coordinator: Steve Spurrier (1st season)
- Offensive scheme: Air Ball
- Defensive coordinator: Cliff Yoshida (1st season)
- Base defense: 4–3
- MVP: John Brinkman
- Captains: Ed Brown; Dennis Tabron
- Home stadium: Wallace Wade Stadium

1980 Atlantic Coast Conference football standings
	Conf.					Overall
Team	W		L		T	W		L		T
No. 10 North Carolina $	6	–	0	–	0	11	–	1	–	0
Maryland	5	–	1	–	0	8	–	4	–	0
NC State	3	–	3	–	0	6	–	5	–	0
Clemson	2	–	4	–	0	6	–	5	–	0
Wake Forest	2	–	4	–	0	5	–	6	–	0
Virginia	2	–	4	–	0	4	–	7	–	0
Duke	1	–	5	–	0	2	–	9	–	0
$ – Conference champion; Rankings from AP Poll

The 1980 Duke Blue Devils football team was an American football team that represented Duke University as a member of the Atlantic Coast Conference (ACC) during the 1980 NCAA Division I-A football season. In their second year under head coach Shirley Wilson, the Blue Devils compiled an overall record of 2–9, with a conference record of 1–5, and finished seventh in the ACC.

== Schedule ==
Date	Opponent	Site	Result	Attendance	Source
September 6	East Carolina*	Wallace Wade Stadium; Durham, NC	L 10–35	27,400	
September 20	at No. 19 Auburn*	Jordan-Hare Stadium; Auburn, AL	L 28–35	57,742	
September 27	Virginia	Wallace Wade Stadium; Durham, NC	L 17–20	14,144	
October 4	at Indiana*	Memorial Stadium; Bloomington, IN	L 21–31	43,120	
October 11	at No. 17 South Carolina*	Williams–Brice Stadium; Columbia, SC	L 7–20	56,451	
October 18	at Clemson	Memorial Stadium; Clemson, SC	W 34–17	59,873	
October 25	Maryland	Wallace Wade Stadium; Durham, NC	L 14–17	17,400	
November 1	Georgia Tech*^{†}	Wallace Wade Stadium; Durham, NC	W 17–12	18,200	
November 8	Wake Forest	Wallace Wade Stadium; Durham, NC (rivalry)	L 24–27	23,000	
November 15	at NC State	Carter Stadium; Raleigh, NC (rivalry)	L 21–38	42,800	
November 22	at No. 15 North Carolina	Kenan Stadium; Chapel Hill, NC (Victory Bell)	L 21–44	51,389	
*Non-conference game; ^{†}Homecoming; Rankings from AP Poll released prior to the game

== Personnel ==
1980 Duke Blue Devils football team roster
Players
Coaches
Offense

Pos.	#	Name	Class
G	55	Brian Baldinger	Jr
G	62	Greg Bamberger	Jr
QB	14	Ben Bennett	Fr
RB	20	Joel Blunk	Fr
RB	21	Greg Boone	So
TE	85	John Brinkman	Sr
RB	10	Bobby Brower	Jr
WR	80	Marvin Brown	Sr
OT	70	Tim Bumgarner	So
WR	91	Dave Burris	Jr
WR	86	Chris Castor	Jr
QB	11	Brent Clinkscale	So
OT	77	Jim Colantuoni	Sr
G	67	Judd Eisenberg	Sr
FB	33	Carl Franks	So
WR	16	Ron Frederick	Jr
TE	88	Mike Fuqua	Sr
RB	3	Chester Gee	So
RB	27	Mike Grayson	Fr
C	72	Tracy Harper	Sr
WR	26	Cedric Jones	Jr
WR	82	Mark Militello	Fr
C	68	Tee Moorman III	So
OT	63	Robert Oxendine	So
G	66	Jay Pelosky	Sr
RB	23	John Poor	Fr
C	52	Zac Price	Jr
G	60	Mike Ryan	So
QB	19	Ronnie Sally	Fr
TE	81	Stuart Schnellenberger	So
QB	2	Mark Schoettmer	Sr
RB	8	David Snow	So
WR	83	Glenn Tillery	So

Defense

Pos.	#	Name	Class
DT	58	Chris Arendt	So
DE	34	Mike Armstrong	Jr
DE	97	Greg Blackwell	Fr
DL	9	Charles Bowser	Jr
LB	44	Craig Brown	Sr
FS	15	Eddie Brown	Sr
FS	12	Craig Browning	Jr
CB	28	Keith Crenshaw	Jr
SS	17	Gary Garstkiewicz	Sr
DB	35	Bobby Glover	Fr
DT	93	Paul Heinsohn	Jr
DT	92	John Horton	So
DT	79	Dave Kostyal	Jr
DE	38	Larry LeNoir	Jr
DT	96	Jerome Ley	So
DT	89	James McIver	Jr
LB	53	Joe Rowe	Sr
CB	7	Aaron Stewart	So
CB	25	Dennis Tabron	Jr
LB	36	Dave Thielemann	Sr
LB	32	Emmett Tilley	So
LB	69	Tracy Turner	Fr
LB	43	Jimmy Tyson	Jr
LB	4	Dan Welsh	Jr
DL	49	Dan Yellott	Jr

Special teams

Pos.	#	Name	Class
P	1	Ricky Brummitt	Sr
K	6	Scott McKinney	Jr

Head coach

- Shirley Wilson

Coordinators/assistant coaches

- Steve Spurrier (OC)

Legend

- (C) Team captain
- (S) Suspended
- (I) Ineligible
- Injured
- Redshirt
