= 1980 Virginia Cavaliers football team =

American college football season

1980 Virginia Cavaliers football
- Conference: Atlantic Coast Conference
- Record: 4–7 (2–4 ACC)
- Head coach: Dick Bestwick (5th season)
- Captains: Quentin Murray; Brian Musselman; Tommy Vigorito
- Home stadium: Scott Stadium

1980 Atlantic Coast Conference football standings
	Conf.					Overall
Team	W		L		T	W		L		T
No. 10 North Carolina $	6	–	0	–	0	11	–	1	–	0
Maryland	5	–	1	–	0	8	–	4	–	0
NC State	3	–	3	–	0	6	–	5	–	0
Clemson	2	–	4	–	0	6	–	5	–	0
Wake Forest	2	–	4	–	0	5	–	6	–	0
Virginia	2	–	4	–	0	4	–	7	–	0
Duke	1	–	5	–	0	2	–	9	–	0
$ – Conference champion; Rankings from AP Poll

The 1980 Virginia Cavaliers football team represented the University of Virginia during the 1980 NCAA Division I-A football season. The Cavaliers were led by fifth-year head coach Dick Bestwick and played their home games at Scott Stadium in Charlottesville, Virginia. They competed as members of the Atlantic Coast Conference, finishing tied for fourth.

== Schedule ==
Date	Time	Opponent	Site	Result	Attendance	Source
September 13	1:30 p.m.	Navy*	Scott Stadium; Charlottesville, VA	W 6–3	35,174	
September 20	1:30 p.m.	NC State	Scott Stadium; Charlottesville, VA	L 13–27	30,072	
September 27	1:30 p.m.	at Duke	Wallace Wade Stadium; Durham, NC	W 20–17	14,144	
October 4	1:30 p.m.	at West Virginia*	Mountaineer Field; Morgantown, WV	L 21–45	45,088	
October 11	1:30 p.m.	Clemson^{†}	Scott Stadium; Charlottesville, VA	L 24–27	32,443	
October 18	1:30 p.m.	at Virginia Tech*	Lane Stadium; Blacksburg, VA (rivalry)	L 0–30	52,000	
October 25	1:00 p.m.	at Wake Forest	Groves Stadium; Winston-Salem, NC	W 24–21	23,300	
November 1	1:30 p.m.	at Tennessee*	Neyland Stadium; Knoxville, TN	W 16–13	94,333	
November 8	1:30 p.m.	Rutgers*	Scott Stadium; Charlottesville, VA	L 17–19	30,011	
November 15	1:00 p.m.	at No. 15 North Carolina	Kenan Memorial Stadium; Chapel Hill, NC (South's Oldest Rivalry)	L 3–26	49,500	
November 22	1:30 p.m.	Maryland	Scott Stadium; Charlottesville, VA (rivalry)	L 0–31	22,407	
*Non-conference game; ^{†}Homecoming; Rankings from AP Poll released prior to the game

== Roster ==
1980 Virginia Cavaliers football team roster
Players
Coaches
Offense Rickey Callinder* RB 16 Att, 62 Yds, 3.9 Avg Lindsay Delaney QB 24 Cmp, 51 Att, 315 Yds, 0 TD Cole Egan* WR 23 Rec, 447 Yds, 19.4 Avg Joe Gulaskey OL Jim Harris OL Derek Jenkins RB 13 Att, 44 Yds, 3.4 Avg Henry Johnson* WR 12 Rec, 212 Yds, 17.7 Avg Gary Phelps WR Erik Polfelt TE 4 Rec, 32 Yds, 8.0 Avg Kevin Riccio* TE 14 Rec, 153 Yds, 10.9 Avg Grant Scott OL Billy Smith WR 1 Rec, 14 Yds, 14.0 Avg Dave Sullivan* OL Bob Sweeney WR 12 Rec, 115 Yds, 9.6 Avg Kenny Word RB 12 Att, 55 Yds, 4.6 Avg

Pos.	#	Name	Class
RB	26	David Hall	Sr
FB	29	Will Hummel	Jr
QB	4	Todd Kirtley	Jr
OT	78	Ron Kort	Sr
WR	8	Ted Manly	Sr
G	79	Dan McKillican	Sr
C	53	Brian Musselman	Sr
G	60	Kurt Pierce	Sr
FB	32	Mark Sanford	Jr
RB	2	Greg Taylor	Sr
RB	22	Tommy Vigorito	Sr
RB	45	Quentin Walker	So
QB	10	Gordie Whitehead	So

Defense Ron Booker* DL Pat Chester* DB Bart Farinholt DB Ponder Harrison DL Harry Hurst DB Bert Krupp LB Keith Lee* DL Sean McCall DB Quentin Murray* DL Ken Newsome LB Bryan Shumock* DB Darryl Smith DB Corwin Word* DB

Pos.	#	Name	Class
DT	99	Stuart Anderson	Jr
DL	72	Mike Budd	Jr
LB	65	Jim Hyson	So
LB	66	Mark LaNeve	Sr
DB	16	Rich Riccardi	So
SS	13	Jon Tenuta	Jr
DT	90	Craig Wolf	So

Special teams

Pos.	#	Name	Class
K	1	Wayne Morrison	So
P	14	Ford Mays	Jr

Head coach

- Dick Bestwick

Coordinators/assistant coaches

Legend

- (C) Team captain
- (S) Suspended
- (I) Ineligible
- Injured
- Redshirt
