= Stuart Anderson (American football) =

American football player (born 1959)

No. 58, 53
- Position: Linebacker

Personal information
- Born: December 25, 1959 (age 66); Mathews, Virginia, U.S.
- Listed height: 6 ft 1 in (1.85 m)
- Listed weight: 238 lb (108 kg)

Career information
- High school: Cardinal (VA) Mathews
- College: Virginia
- NFL draft: 1982: 4th round, 104th overall pick

Career history
- Kansas City Chiefs (1982)*; Washington Redskins (1982–1984); Cleveland Browns (1984); Washington Redskins (1985)
- * Offseason or practice squad member only

Awards and highlights
- Super Bowl champion (XVII); 2× First-team All-ACC (1980, 1981)
- Stats at Pro Football Reference

Stuart Noel Anderson (born December 25, 1959) is an American former professional football player who was a linebacker in the National Football League (NFL) for the Washington Redskins and Cleveland Browns. He played college football for the Virginia Cavaliers and was selected 104th overall in the fourth round of the 1982 NFL draft by the Kansas City Chiefs.
