= 1980 Penn State Nittany Lions football team =

American college football season

1980 Penn State Nittany Lions football

Fiesta Bowl champion

Fiesta Bowl, W 31–19 vs. Ohio State
- Conference: Independent

Ranking
- Coaches: No. 8
- AP: No. 8
- Record: 10–2
- Head coach: Joe Paterno (15th season)
- Offensive scheme: I formation
- Defensive coordinator: Jerry Sandusky (4th season)
- Base defense: 4–3
- Captains: Bob Jagers; Greg Jones
- Home stadium: Beaver Stadium

1980 NCAA Division I-A independents football records
	Conf.					Overall
Team	W		L		T	W		L		T
No. 2 Pittsburgh		–		–		11	–	1	–	0
Tennessee State		–		–		9	–	1	–	0
No. 5 Florida State		–		–		10	–	2	–	0
No. 8 Penn State		–		–		10	–	2	–	0
No. 9 Notre Dame		–		–		9	–	2	–	1
No. 18 Miami (FL)		–		–		9	–	3	–	0
Southern Miss		–		–		9	–	3	–	0
Navy		–		–		8	–	4	–	0
South Carolina		–		–		8	–	4	–	0
Virginia Tech		–		–		8	–	4	–	0
Boston College		–		–		7	–	4	–	0
Northeast Louisiana		–		–		7	–	4	–	0
Rutgers		–		–		7	–	4	–	0
UNLV		–		–		7	–	4	–	0
Tulane		–		–		7	–	5	–	0
Colgate		–		–		5	–	4	–	1
North Texas State		–		–		6	–	5	–	0
Villanova		–		–		6	–	5	–	0
West Virginia		–		–		6	–	6	–	0
Louisville		–		–		5	–	6	–	0
Richmond		–		–		5	–	6	–	0
Syracuse		–		–		5	–	6	–	0
East Carolina		–		–		4	–	7	–	0
Illinois State		–		–		4	–	7	–	0
Temple		–		–		4	–	7	–	0
Army		–		–		3	–	7	–	1
Holy Cross		–		–		3	–	8	–	0
Cincinnati		–		–		2	–	9	–	0
Memphis State		–		–		2	–	9	–	0
William & Mary		–		–		2	–	9	–	0
Georgia Tech		–		–		1	–	9	–	1
Rankings from AP Poll

The 1980 Penn State Nittany Lions football team represented Pennsylvania State University as an independent during the 1980 NCAA Division I-A football season. Led by 15th-year head coach Joe Paterno, the Nittany Lions compiled a record of 10–2 with a win over Ohio State in the Fiesta Bowl. Penn State played home games at Beaver Stadium in University Park, Pennsylvania.

== Schedule ==
Date	Time	Opponent	Rank	Site	TV	Result	Attendance	Source
September 6	1:30 p.m.	Colgate	No. 18	Beaver Stadium; University Park, PA		W 54–10	78,926	
September 20	8:30 p.m.	at Texas A&M	No. 12	Kyle Field; College Station, TX	ESPN (tape delay)	W 25–9	66,234	
September 27	1:50 p.m.	No. 3 Nebraska	No. 11	Beaver Stadium; University Park, PA	ABC	L 7–21	84,585	
October 4	2:30 p.m.	at No. 9 Missouri	No. 17	Faurot Field; Columbia, MO	ESPN (tape delay)	W 29–21	75,298	
October 11	1:30 p.m.	at Maryland	No. 14	Byrd Stadium; College Park, MD (rivalry)		W 24–10	48,123	
October 18	1:30 p.m.	Syracuse^{†}	No. 12	Beaver Stadium; University Park, PA (rivalry)		W 24–7	84,790	
October 25	1:30 p.m.	at West Virginia	No. 13	Mountaineer Field; Morgantown, WV (rivalry)		W 20–15	49,194	
November 1	1:30 p.m.	Miami (FL)	No. 13	Beaver Stadium; University Park, PA	TCS	W 27–12	83,661	
November 8	1:30 p.m.	NC State	No. 10	Beaver Stadium; University Park, PA		W 21–13	83,847	
November 15	1:30 p.m.	at Temple	No. 9	Veterans Stadium; Philadelphia, PA		W 50–7	49,313	
November 28	1:10 p.m.	No. 4 Pittsburgh	No. 5	Beaver Stadium; University Park, PA (rivalry)	ABC	L 9–14	82,459	
December 26	3:00 p.m.	vs. No. 11 Ohio State	No. 10	Sun Devil Stadium; Tempe, AZ (Fiesta Bowl, rivalry)	NBC	W 31–19	66,738	
^{†}Homecoming; Rankings from AP Poll released prior to the game; All times are in Eastern time

== Game summaries ==
=== Nebraska ===
#3 Nebraska at #11 Penn State

Team	1	2	3	4	Total
• No. 3 Cornhuskers	7	7	7	0	21
No. 11 Nittany Lions	0	7	0	0	7

- Date: September 27
- Location: Beaver Stadium, University Park, Pennsylvania
- Game attendance: 84,585

=== Syracuse ===
Syracuse at #12 Penn State

Team	1	2	3	4	Total
Orangemen	0	0	7	0	7
• No.12 Nittany Lions	3	7	0	14	24

- Date: October 18
- Location: Beaver Stadium
- Game attendance: 84,790

Scoring summary
Q1	PSU	Franco 26 yard field goal	PSU 3–0
Q2	PSU	Warner 3 yard run (Franco kick)	PSU 10–0
Q3	SYR	Zunic 11 yard interception return (Anderson kick)	PSU 10–7
Q4	PSU	Warner 6 yard run (Franco kick)	PSU 17–7
Q4	PSU	Jackson 13 yard pass from Blackledge (Franco kick)	PSU 24–7

=== Vs. Ohio State—Fiesta Bowl ===
1980 Fiesta Bowl

Team	1	2	3	4	Total
No. 11 Buckeyes	6	13	0	0	19
• No. 10 Nittany Lions	7	3	7	14	31

- Date: December 26
- Location: Sun Devil Stadium, Tempe, AZ
- Game attendance: 66,738
- Television network: NBC

Scoring summary
1	PSU	Curt Warner 64-yard run (Herb Menhardt kick)	PSU 7-0
1	OSU	Doug Donley 23-yard pass from Art Schlichter (kick failed)	PSU 7-6
2	OSU	Gary Williams 13-yard pass from Art Schlichter (kick failed)	OSU 7-12
2	OSU	Doug Donley 19-yard pass from Art Schlichter (Bob Atha kick)	OSU 7-19
2	PSU	Herb Menhardt 38-field goal	OSU 10-19
3	PSU	Todd Blackledge 3-yard run (Herb Menhardt kick)	OSU 17-19
4	PSU	Jonathan Williams 4-yard run (Herb Menhardt kick)	PSU 24-19
4	PSU	Booker Moore 37-yard run (Herb Menhardt kick)	PSU 31-19

== Roster ==
1980 Penn State Nittany Lions football team roster
Players
Coaches
Offense

Pos.	#	Name	Class
FB	22	Tom Baar	So
QB	14	Todd Blackledge	So
C	59	Mark Battaglia	So
WR	29	Mark Cherewka	Sr
OT	79	Bill Contz	So
OT	74	Pat Daily	Fr
OT	77	Bill Dugan	Sr
G	62	Sean Farrell	Jr
WR	19	Gregg Garrity	So
QB	15	Jeff Hostetler	So
TE	85	Vyto Kab	Jr
TE	81	Mike McCloskey	So
FB	38	Mike Meade	Jr
RB	48	Booker Moore	Sr
G	78	Mike Munchak	Jr
WR	28	Mike O'Donnell	Jr
C	53	Jim Romano	Jr
G	72	Bill Quinn	So
TE	80	Brad Scovill	Sr
RB	25	Curt Warner	So
FB	44	Jon Williams	Fr
G	64	John Wojtowicz	Sr

Defense

Pos.	#	Name	Class
DT	73	Jeff Bergstrom	Jr
DB	30	Matt Bradley	Jr
DT	96	Frank Case	Sr
DE	66	Rich D'Amico	Jr
LB	52	Steve Griffiths	Sr
Hero	17	Harry Hamilton	Fr
S	27	Pete Harris	Sr
DT	99	Greg Jones	Sr
LB	98	Ken Kelley	So
DE	74	Larry Kubin (injured)	Sr
DT	57	Pete Kugler	Sr
DE	37	Walker Lee Ashley	So
CB	12	Paul Lankford	Jr
LB	65	Dave Opfar	Jr
LB	94	Chet Parlavecchio	Jr
LB	97	Scott Radecic	Fr
S	23	John Walsh	Sr
DT	61	Leo Wisniewski	Jr

Special teams

Pos.	#	Name	Class
K	10	Brian Franco	Jr
P	21	Ralph Giacomarro	So

Head coach

- Joe Paterno

Coordinators/assistant coaches

- Dick Anderson
- John Bove
- Tom Bradley
- Booker Brooks
- Fran Ganter
- Bob Phillips
- John Rosenberg
- Jerry Sandusky
- Jim Williams

Legend

- (C) Team captain
- (S) Suspended
- (I) Ineligible
- Injured
- Redshirt

Roster

== NFL draft ==
Seven Nittany Lions were drafted in the 1981 NFL draft.

Round	Pick	Overall	Name	Position	Team
1st	28	28	Booker Moore	Running back	Buffalo Bills
3rd	2	58	Bill Dugan	Offensive guard	Seattle Seahawks
6th	9	147	Pete Kugler	Nose tackle	San Francisco 49ers
6th	10	148	Larry Kubin	Linebacker	Washington Redskins
7th	20	186	Brad Scovill	Tight end	Seattle Seahawks
8th	21	214	Gene Gladys	Defensive back/Defensive line	New Orleans Saints
11th	13	289	Frank Case	Defensive end	Kansas City Chiefs
