= Carlos Bradley =

American football player (born 1960)

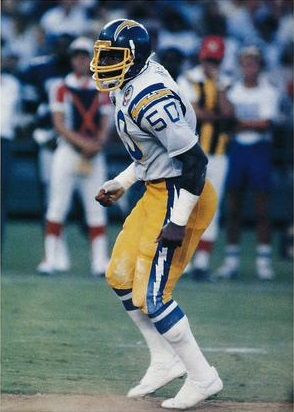
- Bradley in 1984

No. 50, 59
- Position: Linebacker

Personal information
- Born: April 27, 1960 (age 66); Philadelphia, Pennsylvania, U.S.
- Listed height: 6 ft 0 in (1.83 m)
- Listed weight: 224 lb (102 kg)

Career information
- High school: Germantown (Philadelphia)
- College: Wake Forest
- NFL draft: 1981: 11th round, 300th overall pick

Career history
- San Diego Chargers (1981–1985); Cleveland Browns (1987)*; Philadelphia Eagles (1987)
- * Offseason or practice squad member only

Awards and highlights
- First-team All-ACC (1980)

Career NFL statistics
- Sacks: 2.5
- Fumble recoveries: 3
- Interceptions: 2
- Stats at Pro Football Reference

Carlos Bradley (born April 27, 1960) is an American former professional football player who was a linebacker for six seasons with the San Diego Chargers and Philadelphia Eagles of the National Football League (NFL). He was drafted by the San Diego Chargers in the 11th round (300th overall) of the 1981 NFL Draft. He played college football for the Wake Forest Demon Deacons. Bradley is currently working as head trainer at the Aquatic & Fitness Center in Bala Cynwyd, Pennsylvania. He is also a fitness consultant, and a health and wellness speaker for corporations.

Carlos is the President of the International Student Athlete Academy, a 501(c)(3) organization that has worked with student athletes for the last 30 years, academically and athletically. They help them become well rounded people, balancing their skill on both fields.

As a member, Bradley is often invited to travel with the NFL Alumni Association around the world entertaining and training troops. After completing his football career Carlos went on to the world of bodybuilding and powerlifting. Becoming Mr. Pennsylvania super heavyweight for 3 years. Competed and placed first in the WNPF (World Natural Powerlifting Federation) on June 25, 2023, in Hamilton, New Jersey. For the ages 50 and over Carlos held the title for most weight strict power curled with 210lbs.
