= 1980 Richmond Spiders football team =

American college football season

1980 Richmond Spiders football
- Conference: Independent
- Record: 5–6
- Head coach: Dal Shealy (1st season)
- Offensive coordinator: Jim Marshall (2nd season)
- Home stadium: City Stadium

1980 NCAA Division I-A independents football records
	Conf.					Overall
Team	W		L		T	W		L		T
No. 2 Pittsburgh		–		–		11	–	1	–	0
Tennessee State		–		–		9	–	1	–	0
No. 5 Florida State		–		–		10	–	2	–	0
No. 8 Penn State		–		–		10	–	2	–	0
No. 9 Notre Dame		–		–		9	–	2	–	1
No. 18 Miami (FL)		–		–		9	–	3	–	0
Southern Miss		–		–		9	–	3	–	0
Navy		–		–		8	–	4	–	0
South Carolina		–		–		8	–	4	–	0
Virginia Tech		–		–		8	–	4	–	0
Boston College		–		–		7	–	4	–	0
Northeast Louisiana		–		–		7	–	4	–	0
Rutgers		–		–		7	–	4	–	0
UNLV		–		–		7	–	4	–	0
Tulane		–		–		7	–	5	–	0
Colgate		–		–		5	–	4	–	1
North Texas State		–		–		6	–	5	–	0
Villanova		–		–		6	–	5	–	0
West Virginia		–		–		6	–	6	–	0
Louisville		–		–		5	–	6	–	0
Richmond		–		–		5	–	6	–	0
Syracuse		–		–		5	–	6	–	0
East Carolina		–		–		4	–	7	–	0
Illinois State		–		–		4	–	7	–	0
Temple		–		–		4	–	7	–	0
Army		–		–		3	–	7	–	1
Holy Cross		–		–		3	–	8	–	0
Cincinnati		–		–		2	–	9	–	0
Memphis State		–		–		2	–	9	–	0
William & Mary		–		–		2	–	9	–	0
Georgia Tech		–		–		1	–	9	–	1
Rankings from AP Poll

The 1980 Richmond Spiders football team represented Richmond College as an independent during the 1980 NCAA Division I-A football season. The Spiders were led by first-year head coach Dal Shealy and played their home games at City Stadium. The Spiders finished with a 5–6 record.

== Schedule ==
Date	Opponent	Site	Result	Attendance	Source
September 6	Bowling Green	City Stadium; Richmond, VA	W 20–17	10,200	
September 13	at Villanova	Villanova Stadium; Villanova, PA	W 21–7		
September 20	at Wyoming	War Memorial Stadium; Laramie, WY	L 14–35	17,000	
September 27	at West Virginia	Mountaineer Field; Morgantown, WV	L 28–31	40,847	
October 4	at Auburn	Jordan–Hare Stadium; Auburn, AL	L 16–55	47,226	
October 11	East Carolina	City Stadium; Richmond, VA	L 22–24	10,600	
October 18	VMI	City Stadium; Richmond, VA (rivalry)	L 17–22	14,600	
October 25	Virginia Tech	City Stadium; Richmond, VA (Tobacco Bowl)	W 18–7	18,000	
November 1	Cincinnati	City Stadium; Richmond, VA	W 24–10	9,300	
November 15	at Southern Miss	M. M. Roberts Stadium; Hattiesburg, MS	L 12–33	17,320	
November 22	William & Mary	City Stadium; Richmond, VA (rivalry)	W 26–14	14,700	

== Roster ==
1980 Richmond Spiders football team roster
Players			Coaches
Offense: Pos. / # / Name / Class; RB / 20 / Barry Redden / Jr	Defense: Pos. / # / Name / Class; DT / / Mark Seale / Jr	Special teams: Pos. / # / Name / Class	Head coach: Dal Shealy; Coordinators/assistant coaches: Jim Marshall (Offensive coordinator); Legend: (C) Team captain; (S) Suspended; (I) Ineligible; Injured; Redshirt
