= 1980 Miami Hurricanes football team =

American college football season

1980 Miami Hurricanes football

Peach Bowl champion

Peach Bowl, W 20–10 vs. Virginia Tech
- Conference: Independent

Ranking
- Coaches: No. 18
- AP: No. 18
- Record: 9–3
- Head coach: Howard Schnellenberger (2nd season)
- Offensive coordinator: Kim Helton (2nd season)
- Offensive scheme: Pro-style
- Defensive coordinator: Rick Lantz (4th season)
- Base defense: 4–3
- MVP: Mike Goedeker
- Home stadium: Miami Orange Bowl

1980 NCAA Division I-A independents football records
	Conf.					Overall
Team	W		L		T	W		L		T
No. 2 Pittsburgh		–		–		11	–	1	–	0
Tennessee State		–		–		9	–	1	–	0
No. 5 Florida State		–		–		10	–	2	–	0
No. 8 Penn State		–		–		10	–	2	–	0
No. 9 Notre Dame		–		–		9	–	2	–	1
No. 18 Miami (FL)		–		–		9	–	3	–	0
Southern Miss		–		–		9	–	3	–	0
Navy		–		–		8	–	4	–	0
South Carolina		–		–		8	–	4	–	0
Virginia Tech		–		–		8	–	4	–	0
Boston College		–		–		7	–	4	–	0
Northeast Louisiana		–		–		7	–	4	–	0
Rutgers		–		–		7	–	4	–	0
UNLV		–		–		7	–	4	–	0
Tulane		–		–		7	–	5	–	0
Colgate		–		–		5	–	4	–	1
North Texas State		–		–		6	–	5	–	0
Villanova		–		–		6	–	5	–	0
West Virginia		–		–		6	–	6	–	0
Louisville		–		–		5	–	6	–	0
Richmond		–		–		5	–	6	–	0
Syracuse		–		–		5	–	6	–	0
East Carolina		–		–		4	–	7	–	0
Illinois State		–		–		4	–	7	–	0
Temple		–		–		4	–	7	–	0
Army		–		–		3	–	7	–	1
Holy Cross		–		–		3	–	8	–	0
Cincinnati		–		–		2	–	9	–	0
Memphis State		–		–		2	–	9	–	0
William & Mary		–		–		2	–	9	–	0
Georgia Tech		–		–		1	–	9	–	1
Rankings from AP Poll

The 1980 Miami Hurricanes football team represented the University of Miami as an independent during the 1980 NCAA Division I-A football season. Led by second-year head coach Howard Schnellenberger, the Hurricanes played home games at the Miami Orange Bowl in Miami. Miami finished the season with a record of 9–3. They were invited to the Peach Bowl, where they defeated Virginia Tech, 20–10.

== Schedule ==
Date	Opponent	Rank	Site	TV	Result	Attendance	Source
September 6	at Louisville		Fairgrounds Stadium; Louisville, KY (rivalry)		W 24–10	21,120	
September 13	Florida A&M		Miami Orange Bowl; Miami, FL		W 49–0	20,007	
September 20	at No. 18 Houston		Houston Astrodome; Houston, TX		W 14–7	31,423	
September 27	No. 9 Florida State		Miami Orange Bowl; Miami, FL (rivalry)		W 10–9	50,008	
October 11	at No. 7 Notre Dame	No. 13	Notre Dame Stadium; Notre Dame, IN (rivalry)		L 14–32	59,075	
October 18	Mississippi State	No. 18	Miami Orange Bowl; Miami, FL		L 31–34	17,806	
November 1	at No. 13 Penn State		Beaver Stadium; University Park, PA		L 12–27	83,661	
November 8	East Carolina^{†}		Miami Orange Bowl; Miami, FL		W 23–10	11,048	
November 15	at Vanderbilt		Dudley Field; Nashville, TN		W 24–17	12,830	
November 22	North Texas State		Miami Orange Bowl; Miami, FL		W 26–8	20,293	
November 29	at No. 18 Florida		Florida Field; Gainesville, FL (rivalry)	ABC	W 31–7	56,437	
January 2	vs. Virginia Tech	No. 20	Atlanta–Fulton County Stadium; Atlanta, GA (Peach Bowl)	CBS	W 20–10	45,384	
^{†}Homecoming; Rankings from AP Poll released prior to the game

== Game summaries ==
=== Louisville ===
Team	1	2	3	4	Total
• Miami (FL)	0	0	14	10	24
Louisville	0	10	0	0	10

- Date: September 7
- Location: Cardinal Stadium, Louisville, Kentucky
- Game attendance: 22,120

Scoring summary
Q2	LOU	Betz 29 yard field goal	LOU 3–0
Q2	LOU	Trautwein 55 yard interception return (Betz kick)	LOU 10–0
Q3	MIA	Cooper 1 yard pass from Kelly (Miller kick)	LOU 10–7
Q3	MIA	Belk 32 yard pass from Kelly (Miller kick)	MIA 14–10
Q4	MIA	Miller 26 yard field goal	MIA 17–10
Q4	MIA	Lippett 52 yard interception return (Miller kick)	MIA 24–10

=== Florida State ===
#9 Florida State Seminoles (3–0) at Miami (FL) Hurricanes (3–0)

Quarter	1	2	3	4	Total
Florida St	0	0	3	6	9
Miami (FL)	0	7	3	0	10

at Orange Bowl, Miami, Florida

- Date: September 27, 1980
- Game weather: 91 °F (33 °C)
- Game attendance: 50,000
- Recap/Box

Game information

First quarter

- No scoring

Second quarter

- UM – Jim Kelly 1-yard run (Dan Miller kick), 0:41. Miami (FL) 7–0.

Third quarter

- FSU – Bill Capece 26-yard field goal. Miami (FL) 7–3.
- UM – Dan Miller 22-yard field goal. Miami (FL) 10–3.

Fourth quarter

- FSU – Sam Childers 11-yard pass from Rick Stockstill (pass failed). Miami (FL) 10–9. Drive: 55 yards.

Top passers

- FSU – Rick Stockstill – 19/30, 182 yards, TD, INT
- UM – Jim Kelly – 13/22, 172 yards

Top rushers

- FSU – Sam Platt – 10 rushes, 23 yards
- UM

Top receivers

- FSU – Hardis Johnson – 4 receptions, 55 yards
- UM

External videos
- 1980 Florida State at Miami (FL) – Game broadcast

=== at Florida ===
Jim Kelly threw for two touchdowns and halfbacks Mark Rush and Smokey Roan each ran for one as Miami upset Florida on their way to a Peach Bowl berth. Dan Miller had attempted a field goal as time expired with one official signaling the kick was good, while the other did not. Both teams left the field with the score 28–7 before minutes later it was changed to 31–7 as it was explained the official that appeared to wave the kick "no good" was signaling that the clock had run out.

== Roster ==
1980 Miami Hurricanes football team roster
Players
Coaches
Offense

Pos.	#	Name	Class
G	58	Clem Barbarino	Jr
C	61	Don Bailey	So
WR	20	Rocky Belk	So
RB	16	Albert Bentley	Fr
FB	45	Gary Breckner	Jr
WR	43	Larry Brodsky	Jr
OT	53	John Canei	Jr
TE	85	Mark Cooper	So
C	62	John Fenton	Sr
G	63	John Ferguson	Sr
WR	13	Jim Joiner	Sr
QB	12	Jim Kelly	So
G	59	Art Kehoe	Sr
G	56	Jim Pakarney	Sr
QB	9	Mark Richt	So
RB	49	Mark Rush	So
OT	60	Dave Stewart	Jr
WR	27	Pat Walker	Sr
OT	73	Lester Williams	Jr

Defense

Pos.	#	Name	Class
LB	57	Mozell Axson	Sr
LB	41	Donny Brown	So
LB	93	Greg Brown	So
NG	83	Jim Burt	Sr
DT	71	Tony Chickillo	So
DT	75	Charles Cook	Sr
DE	36	John Daniels	Sr
DE	24	Mike Goedeker	Jr
DB	30	David Jefferson	Jr
DB	17	Ronnie Lippett	So
DB	31	Fred Marion	Jr
DT	91	Bob Nelson	Jr
LB	66	Scott Nicolas	Jr
DB	11	Mark Smith	Sr
DB	2	John Swain	Sr

Special teams

Pos.	#	Name	Class
P	5	Greg LaBelle	So
K	1	Dan Miller	Jr

Head coach

- Howard Schnellenberger

Coordinators/assistant coaches

Legend

- (C) Team captain
- (S) Suspended
- (I) Ineligible
- Injured
- Redshirt

== Team players drafted into the NFL ==
Player	Position	Round	Pick	NFL club
John Swain	Defensive back	4	101	Minnesota Vikings
Jim Joiner	Wide receiver	10	263	St. Louis Cardinals
Pat Walker	Wide receiver	11	290	Denver Broncos
