= 1980 Astro-Bluebonnet Bowl =

North Carolina Tar Heels	Texas Longhorns
(10–1)	(7–4)
16	7
Head coach: Dick Crum	Head coach: Fred Akers
AP / Coaches; 13 / 11
	1	2	3	4	Total
North Carolina	6	7	3	0	16
Texas	0	7	0	0	7
- Date: December 31, 1980
- Season: 1980
- Stadium: Astrodome
- Location: Houston, Texas
- MVP: Amos Lawrence, RB; Steve Streater, Safety
- Referee: Robert Aillet (SEC); (substitute for Jimmy Harper of SEC due to death in Harper's family)
- Attendance: 36,667

United States TV coverage
- Network: Mizlou
- Announcers: Ray Scott, John Unitas, and Howard David

The 1980 Astro-Bluebonnet Bowl was a college football postseason bowl game between the Texas Longhorns and the Carolina Tar Heels.

== Background ==
The Tar Heels were champions of the Atlantic Coast Conference for the second time in four seasons and the first under Dick Crum. This was their second straight bowl game appearance and first Astro-Bluebonnet Bowl. Texas was in their first Astro-Bluebonnet Bowl since 1975 after finishing fourth in the Southwest Conference.

== Game summary ==
Amos Lawrence gave the Tar Heels an early lead on a 59-yard touchdown run. The Tar Heels decided to go for a two-point conversion, which failed, keeping the score at 6–0. Mike Luck gave the Longhorns a 7–6 lead on his touchdown run in the second quarter. Kelvin Bryant gave North Carolina the lead on his go-ahead touchdown run to make it 13–7 at halftime. After allowing 224 yards and 11 first downs in the first half, the Tar Heel defense stiffened up and allowed only two first downs and 36 yards in the second half. They forced a fumbled punt snap later converted into a field goal by Jeff Hayes to make it 16–7 while closing out the scoring and securing the Tar Heel win.

== Aftermath ==
The Tar Heels did not return to the Bluebonnet Bowl before its discontinuation and have not won an ACC title since 1980. The Longhorns returned to the Bluebonnet Bowl in 1985 and 1987.

== Statistics ==
Statistics	North Carolina	Texas
First downs	16	13
Yards rushing	234	132
Yards passing	121	128
Total yards	355	260
Punts-Average	5-37.0	5-43.6
Fumbles-Lost	0-0	4-1
Interceptions	0	1
Penalties-Yards	5-35	3-35
