= Ron Wooten =

American football player (born 1959)

No. 61
- Position: Guard

Personal information
- Born: June 28, 1959 (age 67); Bourne, Massachusetts, U.S.
- Listed height: 6 ft 4 in (1.93 m)
- Listed weight: 274 lb (124 kg)

Career information
- High school: Kinston (Kinston, North Carolina)
- College: North Carolina
- NFL draft: 1981: 6th round, 157th overall pick

Career history
- New England Patriots (1981–1989)

Awards and highlights
- New England Patriots All-1980s Team; Second-team All-American (1980); First-team All-ACC (1980)

Career NFL statistics
- Games: 98
- Games Started: 96
- Fumble recoveries: 1
- Stats at Pro Football Reference

Ronald John Wooten (born June 29, 1959) is an American former professional football player who was an offensive guard for seven seasons with the New England Patriots in the National Football League (NFL). He played college football for the North Carolina Tar Heels.

After his football career, Wooten became president of NovaQuest and the executive vice president of corporate development at Quintiles Transnational.

== Career ==
Wooten received his bachelor's degree in chemistry from the University of North Carolina at Chapel Hill and his master's of business administration from Boston University. He played as an offensive guard from 1981 to 1990 with the New England Patriots of the National Football League (NFL).

From 1994 to 2003, Wooten worked with First Union Securities Corporation (now Wachovia Securities, Inc.) in Charlotte, North Carolina, most recently as Managing Director of Investment Banking, advising corporate clients on mergers and acquisition, as well as corporate finance strategies. Earlier in his career at First Union, Wooten helped formulate the product offerings and delivery channels for the company's capital markets business.

Wooten now serves as president of NovaQuest and executive vice president of corporate development at Quintiles Transnational Corporation, a position he has held since 2003. Wooten joined the firm in July 2000 as senior vice president of finance, to manage the formation of NovaQuest's predecessor, the PharmaBio Development Group, and to assist with merger and acquisition and corporate finance strategies.

== Personal life ==
Wooten is married to Ann Wooten, also a graduate of University of North Carolina at Chapel Hill. They have two children, who also graduated from University of North Carolina at Chapel Hill.

Wooten and his former college roommate Donnell Thompson open and operate several franchise businesses together, including Checkers and Rally's and Denny's restaurants.
