= 1980 Pittsburgh Panthers football team =

American college football season

1980 Pittsburgh Panthers football

National champion (CFRA, DeVold, New York Times) Co-national champion (FACT, Sagarin) Gator Bowl champion Eastern champion

Gator Bowl, W 37–9 vs. South Carolina
- Conference: Independent

Ranking
- Coaches: No. 2
- AP: No. 2
- Record: 11–1
- Head coach: Jackie Sherrill (4th season)
- Offensive coordinator: Wally English (2nd season)
- Offensive scheme: West Coast
- Defensive coordinator: Foge Fazio (2nd season)
- Base defense: Multiple front
- Home stadium: Pitt Stadium

1980 NCAA Division I-A independents football records
	Conf.					Overall
Team	W		L		T	W		L		T
No. 2 Pittsburgh		–		–		11	–	1	–	0
Tennessee State		–		–		9	–	1	–	0
No. 5 Florida State		–		–		10	–	2	–	0
No. 8 Penn State		–		–		10	–	2	–	0
No. 9 Notre Dame		–		–		9	–	2	–	1
No. 18 Miami (FL)		–		–		9	–	3	–	0
Southern Miss		–		–		9	–	3	–	0
Navy		–		–		8	–	4	–	0
South Carolina		–		–		8	–	4	–	0
Virginia Tech		–		–		8	–	4	–	0
Boston College		–		–		7	–	4	–	0
Northeast Louisiana		–		–		7	–	4	–	0
Rutgers		–		–		7	–	4	–	0
UNLV		–		–		7	–	4	–	0
Tulane		–		–		7	–	5	–	0
Colgate		–		–		5	–	4	–	1
North Texas State		–		–		6	–	5	–	0
Villanova		–		–		6	–	5	–	0
West Virginia		–		–		6	–	6	–	0
Louisville		–		–		5	–	6	–	0
Richmond		–		–		5	–	6	–	0
Syracuse		–		–		5	–	6	–	0
East Carolina		–		–		4	–	7	–	0
Illinois State		–		–		4	–	7	–	0
Temple		–		–		4	–	7	–	0
Army		–		–		3	–	7	–	1
Holy Cross		–		–		3	–	8	–	0
Cincinnati		–		–		2	–	9	–	0
Memphis State		–		–		2	–	9	–	0
William & Mary		–		–		2	–	9	–	0
Georgia Tech		–		–		1	–	9	–	1
Rankings from AP Poll

The 1980 Pittsburgh Panthers football team represented the University of Pittsburgh as an independent during the 1980 NCAA Division I-A football season. Despite losing one game, the Panthers were named national champion by NCAA-designated major selectors DeVold System, Football Research, and The New York Times, while also named co-national champion by Rothman (FACT) and Sagarin. The university does not claim a national championship for this season, nor are the Panthers popularly recognized for winning that year's national championship. Pitt was awarded the Lambert-Meadowlands Trophy as the champion of the East.

The team is noteworthy for featuring four future members of the Pro Football Hall of Fame: linebacker Rickey Jackson, center Russ Grimm, tackle Jimbo Covert, and quarterback Dan Marino. Several other players on the team, including Mark May and Hugh Green, would go on to be Pro Bowl NFL stars.

== Championship selections ==
Selectors that named Pitt the 1980 national champion:

- 1st-N-Goal
- Angelo Louisa
- ARGH Power Ratings
- College Football Researchers Association
- Foundation for the Analysis of Competitions and Tournaments
- Harry DeVold
- James Howell
- Jeff Self
- The New York Times
- Quality Champions
- Sagarin Ratings
- Steve Eck
- The Fleming System

== Schedule ==
Date	Time	Opponent	Rank	Site	TV	Result	Attendance	Source
September 13	1:30 p.m.	Boston College	No. 3	Pitt Stadium; Pittsburgh, PA	ABC	W 14–6	44,820	
September 20	2:30 p.m.	at Kansas	No. 5	Memorial Stadium; Lawrence, KS		W 18–3	41,300	
September 27	1:30 p.m.	Temple	No. 6	Pitt Stadium; Pittsburgh, PA		W 36–2	47,071	
October 4	1:30 p.m.	Maryland	No. 6	Pitt Stadium; Pittsburgh, PA		W 38–9	47,409	
October 11	7:00 p.m.	at No. 11 Florida State	No. 4	Doak Campbell Stadium; Tallahassee, FL		L 22–36	52,894	
October 18	1:30 p.m.	West Virginia^{†}	No. 11	Pitt Stadium; Pittsburgh, PA (rivalry)		W 42–14	55,130	
October 25	2:00 p.m.	at Tennessee	No. 12	Neyland Stadium; Knoxville, TN		W 30–6	94,008	
November 1	4:00 p.m.	at Syracuse	No. 11	Carrier Dome; Syracuse, NY (rivalry)	ABC	W 43–6	50,243	
November 8	1:30 p.m.	Louisville	No. 9	Pitt Stadium; Pittsburgh, PA		W 41–23	47,280	
November 15	1:30 p.m.	at Army	No. 8	Michie Stadium; West Point, NY		W 45–7	31,150	
November 28	1:00 p.m.	at No. 5 Penn State	No. 4	Beaver Stadium; University Park, PA (rivalry)	ABC	W 14–9	82,459	
December 29	9:00 p.m.	vs. No. 18 South Carolina	No. 3	Gator Bowl Stadium; Jacksonville, FL (Gator Bowl)	ABC	W 37–9	72,297	
^{†}Homecoming; Rankings from AP Poll released prior to the game; All times are in Eastern time

== Game summaries ==
=== Boston College ===
Boston College Eagles at No. 3 Pittsburgh Panthers – Game summary

Quarter	1	2	3	4	Total
Eagles	0	0	6	0	6
No. 3 Panthers	0	8	6	0	14

at Pitt Stadium • Pittsburgh, PA

- Date: September 13
- Game time: 1:30 PM EDT
- Game attendance: 44,820
- TV announcers (ABC): Keith Jackson (play-by-play), Frank Broyles (color commentator) and Bill Flemming (sideline)

Statistics	BC	PITT
First downs	10	21
Total yards	228	334
Rushes/yards	33	113
Passing yards	195	221
Passing: Comp–Att–Int	13-34-4	23-44-5
Time of possession		

Team	Category	Player	Statistics
Boston College	Passing		
Boston College	Rushing		
Boston College	Receiving		
Pittsburgh	Passing		
Pittsburgh	Rushing		
Pittsburgh	Receiving		

Scoring summary

Quarter	Time	Drive			Team	Scoring information	Score	
Quarter	Time	Plays	Yards	TOP	Team	Scoring information	Boston College	Pittsburgh
2					Pittsburgh	Pryor 8-yard touchdown reception from Marino, 2-point run good	0	8
3					Boston College	Schoen 35-yard touchdown reception from Loughery, 2-point pass incomplete	6	8
3					Pittsburgh	Pryor 8-yard touchdown reception from Marino, Trout kick no good	6	14
"TOP" = time of possession. For other American football terms, see Glossary of American football.							6	14

=== At Kansas ===
No. 5 Pittsburgh Panthers at Kansas Jayhawks – Game summary

Quarter	1	2	3	4	Total
No. 5 Panthers	0	10	6	2	18
Jayhawks	3	0	0	0	3

at Memorial Stadium • Lawrence, KS

- Date: September 20
- Game time: 2:30 PM EDT
- Game attendance: 41,300

Statistics	PITT	KU
First downs	24	7
Total yards	456	86
Rushes/yards	173	4
Passing yards	283	82
Passing: Comp–Att–Int	18-39-0	8-22-1
Time of possession		

Team	Category	Player	Statistics
Pittsburgh	Passing		
Pittsburgh	Rushing		
Pittsburgh	Receiving		
Kansas	Passing		
Kansas	Rushing		
Kansas	Receiving		

Scoring summary

Quarter	Time	Drive			Team	Scoring information	Score	
Quarter	Time	Plays	Yards	TOP	Team	Scoring information	Pittsburgh	Kansas
1					Kansas	25-yard field goal by Kallmeyer	0	3
2					Pittsburgh	21-yard field goal by Trout	3	3
2					Pittsburgh	Pryor 2-yard touchdown reception from Marino, Trout kick good	10	3
3					Pittsburgh	Dombrowski 23-yard touchdown reception from Marino, Trout kick no good	16	3
4		–	–	–	Pittsburgh	Safety, Kemp tackled in end zone	18	3
"TOP" = time of possession. For other American football terms, see Glossary of American football.							18	3

=== Temple ===
Temple Owls at No. 6 Pittsburgh Panthers – Game summary

Quarter	1	2	3	4	Total
Owls	2	0	0	0	2
No. 6 Panthers	13	13	3	7	36

at Pitt Stadium • Pittsburgh, PA

- Date: September 27
- Game time: 1:30 PM EDT
- Game attendance: 47,071

Statistics	TU	PITT
First downs	12	17
Total yards	176	371
Rushes/yards	65	101
Passing yards	111	270
Passing: Comp–Att–Int	13-27-3	17-29-1
Time of possession		

Team	Category	Player	Statistics
Temple	Passing		
Temple	Rushing		
Temple	Receiving		
Pittsburgh	Passing		
Pittsburgh	Rushing		
Pittsburgh	Receiving		

Scoring summary

Quarter	Time	Drive			Team	Scoring information	Score	
Quarter	Time	Plays	Yards	TOP	Team	Scoring information	Temple	Pittsburgh
1		–	–	–	Temple	Safety, Heppler tackled in end zone	2	0
1					Pittsburgh	Collier 14-yard touchdown reception from Marino, Trout kick good	2	7
1					Pittsburgh	McCall 22-yard touchdown reception from Marino, 2-point pass incomplete	2	13
2					Pittsburgh	Hawkins 15-yard touchdown reception from Marino, Trout kick good	2	20
2					Pittsburgh	43-yard field goal by Trout	2	23
2					Pittsburgh	23-yard field goal by Trout	2	26
3					Pittsburgh	49-yard field goal by Trout	2	29
4					Pittsburgh	McMillan 3-yard touchdown run, Trout kick good	2	36
"TOP" = time of possession. For other American football terms, see Glossary of American football.							2	36

=== Maryland ===
Maryland Terrapins at No. 6 Pittsburgh Panthers – Game summary

Quarter	1	2	3	4	Total
Terrapins	0	3	6	0	9
No. 6 Panthers	14	7	3	14	38

at Pitt Stadium • Pittsburgh, PA

- Date: October 4
- Game time: 1:30 PM EDT
- Game attendance: 47,409

Statistics	MD	PITT
First downs	14	17
Total yards	221	383
Rushes/yards	22	90
Passing yards	199	293
Passing: Comp–Att–Int	18-35-1	17-34-2
Time of possession		

Team	Category	Player	Statistics
Maryland	Passing		
Maryland	Rushing		
Maryland	Receiving		
Pittsburgh	Passing		
Pittsburgh	Rushing		
Pittsburgh	Receiving		

Scoring summary

Quarter	Time	Drive			Team	Scoring information	Score	
Quarter	Time	Plays	Yards	TOP	Team	Scoring information	Maryland	Pittsburgh
1					Pittsburgh	Collins 51-yard touchdown reception from Marino, Trout kick good	0	7
1					Pittsburgh	Collier 17-yard touchdown reception from Marino, Trout kick good	0	14
2					Pittsburgh	McMillan 2-yard touchdown run, Trout kick good	0	21
2					Maryland	38-yard field goal by Castro	3	21
3					Pittsburgh	40-yard field goal by Trout	3	24
3					Maryland	Havener 12-yard touchdown reception from Tice, 2-point pass incomplete	9	24
4					Pittsburgh	Collins 35-yard touchdown reception from Marino, Trout kick good	9	31
4		—	—	—	Pittsburgh	Fumble recovery returned 0 yards for touchdown by McQuaide, Trout kick good	9	38
"TOP" = time of possession. For other American football terms, see Glossary of American football.							9	38

=== At #11 Florida State ===
No. 4 Pittsburgh Panthers at No. 11 Florida State Seminoles – Game summary

Quarter	1	2	3	4	Total
No. 4 Panthers	7	0	15	0	22
No. 11 Seminoles	3	20	6	7	36

at Doak Campbell Stadium • Tallahassee, FL

- Date: October 11
- Game time: 7:00 PM EDT
- Game attendance: 52,894

Statistics	PITT	FSU
First downs	15	16
Total yards	386	290
Rushes/yards	22-86	56-163
Passing yards	300	127
Passing: Comp–Att–Int	19-35-3	10-20-0
Time of possession		

Team	Category	Player	Statistics
Pittsburgh	Passing		
Pittsburgh	Rushing		
Pittsburgh	Receiving		
Florida State	Passing		
Florida State	Rushing		
Florida State	Receiving		

Scoring summary

Quarter	Time	Drive			Team	Scoring information	Score	
Quarter	Time	Plays	Yards	TOP	Team	Scoring information	Pittsburgh	Florida State
1					Pittsburgh	Collins 39-yard touchdown reception from Marino, Trout kick good	7	0
1					Florida State	24-yard field goal by Capece	7	3
2					Florida State	Johnson 23-yard touchdown reception from Stockstill, Capece kick good	7	10
2					Florida State	Childers 4-yard touchdown reception from Stockstill, Capece kick good	7	17
2					Florida State	43-yard field goal by Capece	7	20
2					Florida State	50-yard field goal by Capece	7	23
3					Pittsburgh	Collins 36-yard touchdown reception from Marino, 2-point pass good	15	23
3					Florida State	30-yard field goal by Capece	15	26
3					Florida State	44-yard field goal by Capece	15	29
3					Pittsburgh	McCall 2-yard touchdown run, Trout kick good	22	29
4					Florida State	Unglaub 13-yard touchdown reception from Stockstill, Capece kick good	22	36
"TOP" = time of possession. For other American football terms, see Glossary of American football.							22	36

=== West Virginia ===
West Virginia Mountaineers at No. 11 Pittsburgh Panthers – Game summary

Quarter	1	2	3	4	Total
Mountaineers	7	0	7	0	14
No. 11 Panthers	7	28	0	7	42

at Pitt Stadium • Pittsburgh, PA

- Date: October 18
- Game time: 1:30 PM EDT
- Game attendance: 55,130

Statistics	WVU	PITT
First downs	13	23
Total yards	177	438
Rushes/yards	36-84	42-179
Passing yards	93	259
Passing: Comp–Att–Int	10-28-2	17-31-2
Time of possession		

Team	Category	Player	Statistics
West Virginia	Passing		
West Virginia	Rushing		
West Virginia	Receiving		
Pittsburgh	Passing		
Pittsburgh	Rushing		
Pittsburgh	Receiving		

Starting free safety Rick Trocano moved over to offense in the second quarter to replace the injured Dan Marino. Previously the starter at QB in 1978, Trocano led Pitt to four second-quarter touchdowns during the Panthers' win at Pitt Stadium.

Scoring summary

Quarter	Time	Drive			Team	Scoring information	Score	
Quarter	Time	Plays	Yards	TOP	Team	Scoring information	West Virginia	Pittsburgh
1					West Virginia	Thomas 7-yard touchdown reception from Luck, Sinclair kick good	7	0
1					Pittsburgh	McCall 1-yard touchdown run, Trout kick good	7	7
2					Pittsburgh	McMillan 1-yard touchdown run, Trout kick good	7	14
2					Pittsburgh	Collins 53-yard touchdown reception from Luck, Trout kick good	7	21
2					Pittsburgh	Collins 25-yard touchdown reception from Trocano, Trout kick good	7	28
2					Pittsburgh	McMillan 1-yard touchdown run, Trout kick good	7	35
3					West Virginia	Thomas 19-yard touchdown reception from Luck, Sinclair kick good	14	35
4					Pittsburgh	Collier 50-yard touchdown reception from Collins, Trout kick good	14	42
"TOP" = time of possession. For other American football terms, see Glossary of American football.							14	42

=== At Tennessee ===
No. 12 Pittsburgh Panthers at Tennessee Volunteers – Game summary

Quarter	1	2	3	4	Total
No. 12 Panthers	3	13	0	14	30
Volunteers	6	0	0	0	6

at Neyland Stadium • Knoxville, TN

- Date: October 25
- Game time: 2:00 PM EDT
- Game attendance: 94,008

Statistics	PITT	TENN
First downs	25	12
Total yards	489	177
Rushes/yards	47-252	38-38
Passing yards	237	139
Passing: Comp–Att–Int	14-25-1	12-28-2
Time of possession		

Team	Category	Player	Statistics
Pittsburgh	Passing		
Pittsburgh	Rushing		
Pittsburgh	Receiving		
Tennessee	Passing		
Tennessee	Rushing		
Tennessee	Receiving		

Scoring summary

Quarter	Time	Drive			Team	Scoring information	Score	
Quarter	Time	Plays	Yards	TOP	Team	Scoring information	Pittsburgh	Tennessee
1					Pittsburgh	39-yard field goal by Trout	3	0
1		–	–	–	Tennessee	Gault returned kickoff 100 yards for a touchdown, Duncan kick no good	3	6
2					Pittsburgh	McCall 1-yard touchdown reception from Trocano, 2-point run failed	9	6
2					Pittsburgh	McMillan 1-yard touchdown run, Trout kick good	16	6
4					Pittsburgh	Trocano 31-yard touchdown run, Trout kick good	23	6
4					Pittsburgh	McMillan 5-yard touchdown run, Trout kick good	30	6
"TOP" = time of possession. For other American football terms, see Glossary of American football.							30	6

=== At Syracuse ===
No. 11 Pittsburgh Panthers at Syracuse Orangemen – Game summary

Quarter	1	2	3	4	Total
No. 11 Panthers	12	14	3	14	43
Orangemen	0	6	0	0	6

at Carrier Dome • Syracuse, NY

- Date: November 1
- Game time: 4:00 PM EST
- Game attendance: 50,243
- TV announcers (ABC): Bill Flemming (play-by-play) and Frank Broyles (color commentator)

Statistics	PITT	SYR
First downs	24	17
Total yards	500	285
Rushes/yards	43-221	43-62
Passing yards	279	223
Passing: Comp–Att–Int	21-38-2	17-34-3
Time of possession		

Team	Category	Player	Statistics
Pittsburgh	Passing		
Pittsburgh	Rushing		
Pittsburgh	Receiving		
Syracuse	Passing		
Syracuse	Rushing		
Syracuse	Receiving		

Scoring summary

Quarter	Time	Drive			Team	Scoring information	Score	
Quarter	Time	Plays	Yards	TOP	Team	Scoring information	Pittsburgh	Syracuse
1					Pittsburgh	36-yard field goal by Trout	3	0
1					Pittsburgh	34-yard field goal by Trout	6	0
1					Pittsburgh	McCall 6-yard touchdown reception from Trocano, 2-point pass incomplete	12	0
2					Pittsburgh	McMillan 39-yard touchdown run, Trout kick good	19	0
2					Pittsburgh	McMillan 45-yard touchdown run, Trout kick good	26	0
2					Syracuse	Warner 1-yard touchdown run, 2-point run failed	26	6
3					Pittsburgh	26-yard field goal by Trout	29	6
4					Pittsburgh	Collins 54-yard touchdown reception from Trocano, Trout kick good	36	6
4					Pittsburgh	Collins 8-yard touchdown reception from Trocano, Trout kick good	43	6
"TOP" = time of possession. For other American football terms, see Glossary of American football.							43	6

=== Louisville ===
Louisville Cardinals at No. 9 Pittsburgh Panthers – Game summary

Quarter	1	2	3	4	Total
Cardinals	0	9	0	14	23
No. 9 Panthers	0	20	21	0	41

at Pitt Stadium • Pittsburgh, Pennsylvania

- Date: November 8
- Game time: 1:30 PM EST
- Game attendance: 47,280

Statistics	LOU	PITT
First downs	11	15
Total yards	239	404
Rushes/yards	44-132	48-173
Passing yards	107	231
Passing: Comp–Att–Int	6-23-5	11-24-2
Time of possession		

Team	Category	Player	Statistics
Louisville	Passing		
Louisville	Rushing		
Louisville	Receiving		
Pittsburgh	Passing		
Pittsburgh	Rushing		
Pittsburgh	Receiving		

Scoring summary

Quarter	Time	Drive			Team	Scoring information	Score	
Quarter	Time	Plays	Yards	TOP	Team	Scoring information	Louisville	Pittsburgh
2					Louisville	34-yard field goal by Betz	3	0
2					Louisville	Mitchell 6-yard touchdown reception from May, Betz kick no good	9	0
2					Pittsburgh	24-yard field goal by Trout	9	3
2					Pittsburgh	McCall 1-yard touchdown run, Trout kick good	9	10
2					Pittsburgh	Collins 27-yard touchdown reception from Trocano, Trout kick good	9	17
2					Pittsburgh	30-yard field goal by Trout	9	20
3					Pittsburgh	McMillan 6-yard touchdown run, Trout kick good	9	27
3					Pittsburgh	Hawkins 2-yard touchdown run, Trout kick good	9	34
3					Pittsburgh	Collins 67-yard touchdown reception from Trocano, Trout kick good	9	41
4					Louisville	Hickman 3-yard touchdown run, Betz kick good	16	41
4					Louisville	Gannon 15-yard touchdown reception from May, Betz kick good	23	41
"TOP" = time of possession. For other American football terms, see Glossary of American football.							23	41

=== At Army ===
No. 8 Pittsburgh Panthers at Army Cadets – Game summary

Quarter	1	2	3	4	Total
No. 8 Panthers	28	7	3	7	45
Cadets	0	7	0	0	7

at Michie Stadium • West Point, NY

- Date: November 15
- Game time: 1:30 PM EST
- Game attendance: 31,150

Statistics	PITT	ARMY
First downs	33	8
Total yards	576	172
Rushes/yards	31-142	46-58
Passing yards	434	114
Passing: Comp–Att–Int	31-54-7	9-19-1
Time of possession		

Team	Category	Player	Statistics
Pittsburgh	Passing		
Pittsburgh	Rushing		
Pittsburgh	Receiving		
Army	Passing		
Army	Rushing		
Army	Receiving		

Scoring summary

Quarter	Time	Drive			Team	Scoring information	Score	
Quarter	Time	Plays	Yards	TOP	Team	Scoring information	Pittsburgh	Army
1					Pittsburgh	Collins 7-yard touchdown reception from Trocano, Trout kick good	7	0
2					Pittsburgh	DiBartolia 1-yard touchdown run, Trout kick good	14	0
1					Pittsburgh	Collier 7-yard touchdown reception from Trocano, Trout kick good	21	0
2					Pittsburgh	Hawkins 2-yard touchdown run, Trout kick good	28	0
2					Pittsburgh	Collier 16-yard touchdown reception from Marino, Trout kick good	35	0
2					Army	Walker 85-yard touchdown run, Aucoin kick good	35	7
3					Pittsburgh	30-yard field goal by Trout	38	7
4					Pittsburgh	Hawkins 32-yard touchdown reception from Marino, Trout kick good	45	7
"TOP" = time of possession. For other American football terms, see Glossary of American football.							45	7

=== At #5 Penn State ===
No. 4 Pittsburgh Panthers at No. 5 Penn State Nittany Lions – Game summary

Quarter	1	2	3	4	Total
No. 4 Panthers	0	7	7	0	14
No. 5 Nittany Lions	3	0	6	0	9

at Beaver Stadium • University Park, PA

- Date: November 28
- Game time: 1:00 PM EST
- Game attendance: 82,459
- TV announcers (ABC): Keith Jackson (play-by-play) and Ara Parseghian (color commentator)

Statistics	PITT	PSU
First downs	12	16
Total yards	234	257
Rushes/yards	40-91	43-105
Passing yards	143	152
Passing: Comp–Att–Int	8-22-3	12-32-1
Time of possession		

Team	Category	Player	Statistics
Pittsburgh	Passing		
Pittsburgh	Rushing		
Pittsburgh	Receiving		
Penn State	Passing		
Penn State	Rushing		
Penn State	Receiving		

Scoring summary

Quarter	Time	Drive			Team	Scoring information	Score	
Quarter	Time	Plays	Yards	TOP	Team	Scoring information	Pittsburgh	Penn State
1					Penn State	27-yard field goal by Menhardt	0	3
2					Pittsburgh	Pryor 16-yard touchdown reception from Trocano, Trout kick good	7	3
3					Pittsburgh	Trocano 9-yard touchdown run, Trout kick good	14	3
3					Penn State	Jackson 13-yard touchdown reception from Blackledge, 2-point pass incomplete	14	9
"TOP" = time of possession. For other American football terms, see Glossary of American football.							14	9

=== Vs. #18 South Carolina (Gator Bowl) ===
1980 Gator Bowl: #3 Pittsburgh Panthers vs. #18 South Carolina Gamecocks – Game summary

Quarter	1	2	3	4	Total
No. 3 Panthers	10	7	17	3	37
No. 18 Gamecocks	0	3	0	6	9

at Gator Bowl Stadium • Jacksonville, FL

- Date: December 29
- Game time: 9:00 PM EST
- Game attendance: 72,297
- Referee: Robert Carpenter (ACC)
- TV announcers (ABC): Al Michaels (play-by-play), Ara Parseghian (color commentator) and Steve Davis (sideline reporter)

Statistics	PITT	S CAR
First downs	22	17
Total yards	400	284
Rushes/yards	40-167	40-116
Passing yards	233	168
Passing: Comp–Att–Int	17-34-3	11-27-3
Time of possession		

Team	Category	Player	Statistics
Pittsburgh	Passing		
Pittsburgh	Rushing		
Pittsburgh	Receiving		
South Carolina	Passing		
South Carolina	Rushing		
South Carolina	Receiving		

Scoring summary

Quarter	Time	Drive			Team	Scoring information	Score	
Quarter	Time	Plays	Yards	TOP	Team	Scoring information	Pittsburgh	South Carolina
1					Pittsburgh	Trocano 1-yard touchdown run, Trout kick good	7	0
2					Pittsburgh	35-yard field goal by Trout	10	0
2					South Carolina	39-yard field goal by Gillespie	10	3
2					Pittsburgh	Collier 3-yard touchdown run, Trout kick good	17	3
3					Pittsburgh	25-yard field goal by Trout	20	3
3					Pittsburgh	McMillan 3-yard touchdown run, Trout kick good	27	3
3					Pittsburgh	McMillan 3-yard touchdown run, Trout kick good	34	3
4					Pittsburgh	29-yard field goal by Trout	37	3
4					South Carolina	Gillespie 14-yard touchdown reception from Beckham, Leopard kick no good	37	9
"TOP" = time of possession. For other American football terms, see Glossary of American football.							37	9

== Personnel ==
=== Coaching staff ===
1980 Pittsburgh Panthers football staff
Coaching staff: Jackie Sherrill – Head coach; Foge Fazio – Assistant head coach/defensive coordinator; Wally English – Offensive coordinator/quarterbacks; Joe Daniels – Running backs; Ron Dickerson – Defensive backs; Bob Matey – Defensive line; Joe Moore – Offensive line; Joe Naunchik – Receivers; Ray Zingler – Defensive ends	Support staff: Alex Kramer – Administrative assistant; Kevin Dickey – Recruiting doordinator; Nick Rapone – Part-Time Assistant; Bob Davie – Part-Time Assistant; Kirk Ferentz – Part-Time Assistant	Strength and conditioning staff: Buddy Morris – Weight training coordinator

=== Roster ===
1980 Pittsburgh Panthers football team roster
Players
Coaches
Offense

Pos.	#	Name	Class
G	70	Emil Boures	Jr
TE	18	John Brown	So
WR	4	Willie Collier	Sr
RB	32	Dwight Collins	Fr
OT	75	Jimbo Covert	So
QB	7	Dan Daniels	So
WR	80	Julius Dawkins	So
G	64	Rob Fada	So
C	56	Russ Grimm	Sr
RB	12	Artrell Hawkins	Sr
QB	13	Dan Marino	So
OT	73	Mark May	Sr
RB	34	Joe McCall	Fr
RB	40	Randy McMillan	Sr
TE	84	Benjie Pryor	Sr
C	60	Terry Quinn	Jr
G	77	Ron Sams	So
OL	53	Jim Sweeney	Fr
QB	8	Rick Trocano	Sr

Defense

Pos.	#	Name	Class
DT	68	Jerry Boyarsky	Sr
DB	5	Tom Flynn	Fr
DE	99	Hugh Green	Sr
DE	87	Rickey Jackson	Sr
LB	59	Charles "Yogi" Jones	Jr
LB	55	Rich Kraynak	So
DB	26	Tim Lewis	So
DT	71	Bill Maas	Fr
DT	86	Greg Meisner	Sr
DT	76	Bill Neill	Sr
DL	63	Dave Puzzuoli	So
S	29	Dan Short	So
LB	66	Sal Sunseri	Jr
CB	3	Lynn Thomas	Sr
SS	48	Carlton Williamson	Sr
DE	6	Al Wenglikowski	So

Special teams

Pos.	#	Name	Class
K	1	David Trout	Sr

Head coach

- Jackie Sherrill

Coordinators/assistant coaches

Legend

- (C) Team captain
- (S) Suspended
- (I) Ineligible
- Injured
- Redshirt

== Awards and honors ==
- Hugh Green, Walter Camp Award
- Hugh Green, Lombardi Award
- Hugh Green, Maxwell Award
- Mark May, Outland Trophy

== Team players drafted into the NFL ==
Player	Position	Round	Pick	NFL club
Hugh Green	Defensive end	1	7	Tampa Bay Buccaneers
Randy McMillan	Running back	1	12	Baltimore Colts
Mark May	Tackle	1	20	Washington Redskins
Rickey Jackson	Linebacker	2	51	New Orleans Saints
Greg Meisner	Defensive tackle	3	63	Los Angeles Rams
Carlton Williamson	Defensive back	3	65	San Francisco 49ers
Russ Grimm	Center	3	69	Washington Redskins
Bill Neill	Defensive tackle	5	115	New York Giants
Benjie Pryor	Tight end	5	120	Cincinnati Bengals
Lynn Thomas	Defensive back	5	121	San Francisco 49ers
Jerry Boyarsky	Defensive tackle	5	128	New Orleans Saints
Rick Trocano	Quarterback	11	292	Pittsburgh Steelers

== Media ==
=== Radio ===
Flagship station	Play-by-play	Color commentator	Sideline reporter	Studio host
WTAE–AM 1250	Bill Hillgrove	John Sauer		
