= 1980 East Carolina Pirates football team =

American college football season

1980 East Carolina Pirates football
- Conference: Independent
- Record: 4–7
- Head coach: Ed Emory (1st season)
- Defensive coordinator: Norm Parker (1st season)
- Home stadium: Ficklen Memorial Stadium

1980 NCAA Division I-A independents football records
	Conf.					Overall
Team	W		L		T	W		L		T
No. 2 Pittsburgh		–		–		11	–	1	–	0
Tennessee State		–		–		9	–	1	–	0
No. 5 Florida State		–		–		10	–	2	–	0
No. 8 Penn State		–		–		10	–	2	–	0
No. 9 Notre Dame		–		–		9	–	2	–	1
No. 18 Miami (FL)		–		–		9	–	3	–	0
Southern Miss		–		–		9	–	3	–	0
Navy		–		–		8	–	4	–	0
South Carolina		–		–		8	–	4	–	0
Virginia Tech		–		–		8	–	4	–	0
Boston College		–		–		7	–	4	–	0
Northeast Louisiana		–		–		7	–	4	–	0
Rutgers		–		–		7	–	4	–	0
UNLV		–		–		7	–	4	–	0
Tulane		–		–		7	–	5	–	0
Colgate		–		–		5	–	4	–	1
North Texas State		–		–		6	–	5	–	0
Villanova		–		–		6	–	5	–	0
West Virginia		–		–		6	–	6	–	0
Louisville		–		–		5	–	6	–	0
Richmond		–		–		5	–	6	–	0
Syracuse		–		–		5	–	6	–	0
East Carolina		–		–		4	–	7	–	0
Illinois State		–		–		4	–	7	–	0
Temple		–		–		4	–	7	–	0
Army		–		–		3	–	7	–	1
Holy Cross		–		–		3	–	8	–	0
Cincinnati		–		–		2	–	9	–	0
Memphis State		–		–		2	–	9	–	0
William & Mary		–		–		2	–	9	–	0
Georgia Tech		–		–		1	–	9	–	1
Rankings from AP Poll

The 1980 East Carolina Pirates football team was an American football team that represented East Carolina University as an independent during the 1980 NCAA Division I-A football season. In their first season under head coach Ed Emory, the team compiled a 4–7 record.

== Schedule ==
Date	Opponent	Site	TV	Result	Attendance	Source
September 6	at Duke	Wallace Wade Stadium; Durham, NC		W 35–10	27,400	
September 13	Southwestern Louisiana	Ficklen Memorial Stadium; Greenville, NC		L 21–27	29,631	
September 20	at No. 9 Florida State	Doak Campbell Stadium; Tallahassee, FL	WITN	L 7–63	50,547	
September 27	Southern Miss	Ficklen Memorial Stadium; Greenville, NC	WITN	L 7–35	20,037	
October 11	at Richmond	City Stadium; Richmond, VA		W 24–22	10,600	
October 18	Western Carolina	Ficklen Memorial Stadium; Greenville, NC		W 24–14	21,300	
October 25	at No. 7 North Carolina	Kenan Memorial Stadium; Chapel Hill, NC		L 3–31	48,100	
November 1	William & Mary	Ficklen Memorial Stadium; Greenville, NC		W 31–23	18,600	
November 8	at Miami (FL)	Miami Orange Bowl; Miami, FL		L 10–23	11,048	
November 15	Eastern Kentucky	Ficklen Memorial Stadium; Greenville, NC		L 16–28	10,021	
November 22	at NC State	Carter–Finley Stadium; Raleigh, NC (rivalry)		L 14–36	46,200	
Rankings from AP Poll released prior to the game
