= 1980 Maryland Terrapins football team =

American college football season

1980 Maryland Terrapins football

Tangerine Bowl, L 20–35 vs. Florida
- Conference: Atlantic Coast Conference
- Record: 8–4 (5–1 ACC)
- Head coach: Jerry Claiborne (9th season)
- Home stadium: Byrd Stadium

1980 Atlantic Coast Conference football standings
| | Conf. | | | | | Overall |
| Team | W | | L | | T | W | | L | | T |
|---|---|---|---|---|---|---|---|---|---|---|
| No. 10 North Carolina $ | 6 | – | 0 | – | 0 | 11 | – | 1 | – | 0 |
| Maryland | 5 | – | 1 | – | 0 | 8 | – | 4 | – | 0 |
| NC State | 3 | – | 3 | – | 0 | 6 | – | 5 | – | 0 |
| Clemson | 2 | – | 4 | – | 0 | 6 | – | 5 | – | 0 |
| Wake Forest | 2 | – | 4 | – | 0 | 5 | – | 6 | – | 0 |
| Virginia | 2 | – | 4 | – | 0 | 4 | – | 7 | – | 0 |
| Duke | 1 | – | 5 | – | 0 | 2 | – | 9 | – | 0 |
$ – Conference champion; Rankings from AP Poll

The 1980 Maryland Terrapins football team represented the University of Maryland in the 1980 NCAA Division I-A football season. In their ninth season under head coach Jerry Claiborne, the Terrapins compiled an 8–4 record (5–1 in conference), finished in second place in the Atlantic Coast Conference, and outscored their opponents 211 to 165. The team finished its season with a 35–20 loss to Florida in the 1980 Tangerine Bowl. The team's statistical leaders included Mike Tice with 928 passing yards, Charlie Wysocki with 1,359 rushing yards, and Chris Havener with 436 receiving yards.

== Schedule ==
| Date | Time | Opponent | Rank | Site | TV | Result | Attendance | Source |
|---|---|---|---|---|---|---|---|---|
| September 6 | | Villanova* | | Byrd Stadium; College Park, MD | | W 7–3 | 32,650 | |
| September 13 | | Vanderbilt* | | Byrd Stadium; College Park, MD | | W 31–6 | 27,150 | |
| September 20 | | at West Virginia* | | Mountaineer Field; Morgantown, WV (rivalry) | | W 14–11 | 48,038 | |
| September 27 | | at No. 14 North Carolina | No. 19 | Kenan Memorial Stadium; Chapel Hill, NC | | L 3–17 | 51,400 | |
| October 4 | 1:30 p.m. | at No. 6 Pittsburgh* | | Pitt Stadium; Pittsburgh, PA | | L 9–38 | 47,409 | |
| October 11 | | No. 14 Penn State* | | Byrd Stadium; College Park, MD (rivalry) | | L 10–24 | 48,123 | |
| October 18 | | Wake Forest | | Byrd Stadium; College Park, MD | | W 11–10 | 36,472 | |
| October 25 | | at Duke | | Wallace Wade Stadium; Durham, NC | | W 17–14 | 17,400 | |
| November 1 | | NC State^{†} | | Byrd Stadium; College Park, MD | | W 24–0 | 40,016 | |
| November 15 | | Clemson | | Byrd Stadium; College Park, MD | | W 34–7 | 32,650 | |
| November 22 | | at Virginia | | Scott Stadium; Charlottesville, VA (rivalry) | | W 31–0 | 22,407 | |
| December 20 | | vs. Florida* | | Orlando Stadium; Orlando, FL (Tangerine Bowl) | MTN | L 20–35 | 52,541 | |
*Non-conference game; ^{†}Homecoming; Rankings from AP Poll released prior to the game; All times are in Eastern time

== Roster ==
1980 Maryland Terrapins football team roster
Players
Coaches
Offense

| Pos. | # | Name | Class |
|---|---|---|---|
| QB | 7 | Boomer Esiason | Fr |
| RB | 42 | Jeff Rodenberger | Jr |
| TE | 85 | Eric Sievers | Sr |
| TE | 82 | John Tice | So |
| QB | 14 | Mike Tice | Sr |

Defense

| Pos. | # | Name | Class |
|---|---|---|---|
| DT | 68 | Todd Benson | Sr |
| DB | 25 | Lloyd Burruss | Sr |
| DT | 98 | Mark Duda | So |
| DB | 40 | Steve Trimble | Sr |

Special teams

| Pos. | # | Name | Class |

Head coach

- Jerry Claiborne

Coordinators/assistant coaches

Legend

- (C) Team captain
- (S) Suspended
- (I) Ineligible
- Injured
- Redshirt
