= Rick Donnalley =

American football player (born 1958)

No. 55, 76, 51
- Positions: Center, guard

Personal information
- Born: December 11, 1958 (age 67); Wilmington, Delaware, U.S.
- Listed height: 6 ft 2 in (1.88 m)
- Listed weight: 261 lb (118 kg)

Career information
- High school: Sanderson (Raleigh, North Carolina)
- College: North Carolina
- NFL draft: 1981: 3rd round, 73rd overall pick

Career history
- Pittsburgh Steelers (1982–1983); Washington Redskins (1984–1985); Kansas City Chiefs (1986–1987)

Awards and highlights
- Second-team All-American (1980); First-team All-ACC (1980)

Career NFL statistics
- Games played: 71
- Games started: 49
- Kick return: 1
- Stats at Pro Football Reference

William Frederick Donnalley (born December 11, 1958) is an American former professional football player who was a center in the National Football League (NFL). Donnalley was selected in the third round by the Pittsburgh Steelers out of the University of North Carolina in the 1981 NFL draft. His younger brother, Kevin Donnalley, also played in the NFL.
