= 1980 All-Atlantic Coast Conference football team =

American college football all-star team

The 1980 All-Atlantic Coast Conference football team consists of American football players chosen by various selectors for their All-Atlantic Coast Conference ("ACC") teams for the 1980 college football season. Selectors in 1980 included the Associated Press (AP).

== Offensive selections ==
=== Wide receivers ===
- Perry Tuttle, Clemson (AP)

=== Tackles ===
- Chris Koehne, NC State (AP)
- Lee Nanney, Clemson (AP)

=== Guards ===
- Ron Wooten, North Carolina (AP)
- Billy Ard, Wake Forest (AP)

=== Centers ===
- Rick Donnalley, North Carolina (AP)

=== Tight ends ===
- John Brinkman, Duke (AP)

=== Quarterbacks ===
- Jay Venuto, Wake Forest (AP)

=== Running backs ===
- Charlie Wysocki, Maryland (AP)
- Amos Lawrence, North Carolina (AP)
- Kelvin Bryant, North Carolina (AP)

== Defensive selections ==
=== Defensive linemen ===
- Lawrence Taylor, North Carolina (AP)
- Donnell Thompson, North Carolina (AP)
- Bubba Green, NC State (AP)
- Stuart Anderson, Virginia (AP)
- Martin Van Horn, Maryland (AP)

=== Linebackers ===
- Darrell Nicholson, North Carolina (AP)
- Carlos Bradley, Wake Forest (AP)

=== Defensive backs ===
- Steve Streater, North Carolina (AP)
- Dennis Tabron, Duke (AP)
- Lloyd Burruss, Maryland (AP)
- Bryan Shumock, Virginia (AP)

== Special teams ==
=== Placekickers ===
- Obed Ariri, Clemson (AP)

=== Punters ===
- Steve Streater, North Carolina (AP)

== Key ==
AP = Associated Press

== See also ==
1980 College Football All-America Team
