= 1980 South Carolina Gamecocks football team =

American college football season

1980 South Carolina Gamecocks football

Gator Bowl, L 9–37 vs. Pittsburgh
- Conference: Independent
- Record: 8–4
- Head coach: Jim Carlen (6th season)
- Defensive coordinator: Richard Bell (6th season)
- Home stadium: Williams–Brice Stadium

1980 NCAA Division I-A independents football records
	Conf.					Overall
Team	W		L		T	W		L		T
No. 2 Pittsburgh		–		–		11	–	1	–	0
Tennessee State		–		–		9	–	1	–	0
No. 5 Florida State		–		–		10	–	2	–	0
No. 8 Penn State		–		–		10	–	2	–	0
No. 9 Notre Dame		–		–		9	–	2	–	1
No. 18 Miami (FL)		–		–		9	–	3	–	0
Southern Miss		–		–		9	–	3	–	0
Navy		–		–		8	–	4	–	0
South Carolina		–		–		8	–	4	–	0
Virginia Tech		–		–		8	–	4	–	0
Boston College		–		–		7	–	4	–	0
Northeast Louisiana		–		–		7	–	4	–	0
Rutgers		–		–		7	–	4	–	0
UNLV		–		–		7	–	4	–	0
Tulane		–		–		7	–	5	–	0
Colgate		–		–		5	–	4	–	1
North Texas State		–		–		6	–	5	–	0
Villanova		–		–		6	–	5	–	0
West Virginia		–		–		6	–	6	–	0
Louisville		–		–		5	–	6	–	0
Richmond		–		–		5	–	6	–	0
Syracuse		–		–		5	–	6	–	0
East Carolina		–		–		4	–	7	–	0
Illinois State		–		–		4	–	7	–	0
Temple		–		–		4	–	7	–	0
Army		–		–		3	–	7	–	1
Holy Cross		–		–		3	–	8	–	0
Cincinnati		–		–		2	–	9	–	0
Memphis State		–		–		2	–	9	–	0
William & Mary		–		–		2	–	9	–	0
Georgia Tech		–		–		1	–	9	–	1
Rankings from AP Poll

The 1980 South Carolina Gamecocks football team represented the University of South Carolina as an independent during the 1980 NCAA Division I-A football season. Led by sixth-year head coach Jim Carlen, the Gamecocks compiled a record of 8–4. South Carolina was invited to the Gator Bowl, where they lost to Pittsburgh, 37–9. Gamecocks running back George Rogers won the Heisman Trophy.

In 1980, the South Carolina Gamecocks returned with plenty of talent, which was headlined by senior running back and Heisman candidate George Rogers. His 1,781 yards was the best in the nation and earned him a spot as a finalist for the Heisman Trophy. The Downtown Athletic Club in New York City named Rogers as the winner of the 1980 Heisman Trophy. Rogers beat out an impressive group of players, including Pittsburgh defensive lineman Hugh Green and Georgia running back Herschel Walker. Rogers also earned spots on eight All-America teams, all First Team honors.

Rogers had his number "38" retired during halftime ceremonies at South Carolina's final 1980 home game. He was the first University of South Carolina player to have his jersey retired while still active at the school.

Rogers left the Gamecock football program as its most successful running back, and many of his records remain after all these years. His 5,204 yards is still the highest career total by any Gamecock running back, and his 31 rushing touchdowns is tied with Harold Green for second place behind Marcus Lattimore. He is second on the all-time points scored list with 202. He also gained more than 100 yards in each of his final 22 college games.

== Schedule ==
Date	Opponent	Rank	Site	TV	Result	Attendance	Source
September 6	Pacific (CA)		Williams–Brice Stadium; Columbia, SC		W 37–0	56,211	
September 13	Wichita State		Williams–Brice Stadium; Columbia, SC		W 73–0	55,761	
September 20	at No. 4 USC	No. 20	Los Angeles Memorial Coliseum; Los Angeles, CA	WOLO	L 13–23	58,385	
September 27	at No. 17 Michigan		Michigan Stadium; Ann Arbor, MI		W 17–14	104,213	
October 4	NC State	No. 18	Williams–Brice Stadium; Columbia, SC		W 30–10	56,581	
October 11	Duke	No. 17	Williams–Brice Stadium; Columbia, SC		W 20–7	56,451	
October 18	Cincinnati	No. 15	Williams–Brice Stadium; Columbia, SC		W 49–7	56,599	
November 1	at No. 4 Georgia	No. 14	Sanford Stadium; Athens, GA (rivalry)	ABC	L 10–13	62,200	
November 8	The Citadel	No. 15	Williams–Brice Stadium; Columbia, SC		W 45–24	55,937	
November 15	Wake Forest	No. 14	Williams–Brice Stadium; Columbia, SC		W 39–38	55,583	
November 22	at Clemson	No. 14	Memorial Stadium; Clemson, SC (rivalry)		L 6–27	64,200	
December 29	vs. No. 3 Pittsburgh	No. 18	Gator Bowl Stadium; Jacksonville, FL (Gator Bowl)	ABC	L 9–37	72,287	
Rankings from AP Poll released prior to the game

== Roster ==
1980 South Carolina Gamecocks football team roster
Players
Coaches
Offense

Pos.	#	Name	Class
G	67	Jeff Doyle	Jr
QB	10	Garry Harper	Sr
RB	38	George Rogers	Sr
TE	47	Willie Scott	Sr
OT	76	Chuck Slaughter	Jr
RB	36	Johnnie Wright	Jr

Defense

Pos.	#	Name	Class
DT	74	Chuck Allen	Sr
DT	70	Andrew Provence	So
DT	52	Emanuel Weaver	Jr

Special teams

Pos.	#	Name	Class
K		Eddie Leopard
P	13	Chris Norman	Fr

Head coach

- Jim Carlen

Coordinators/assistant coaches

Legend

- (C) Team captain
- (S) Suspended
- (I) Ineligible
- Injured
- Redshirt

== Awards and honors ==
- George Rogers, Heisman Trophy

== Team players in the NFL ==
Player	Position	Round	Pick	NFL club
George Rogers	Running back	1	1	New Orleans Saints
