= 1980 Gator Bowl =

American college football game

Pittsburgh Panthers	South Carolina Gamecocks
(10–1)	(8–3)
Independent	Independent
37	9
Head coach: Jackie Sherrill	Head coach: Jim Carlen
AP / Coaches; 3 / 3	AP / Coaches; 18 / 18
	1	2	3	4	Total
Pittsburgh	10	7	17	3	37
South Carolina	0	3	0	6	9
- Date: December 29, 1980
- Season: 1980
- Stadium: Gator Bowl Stadium
- Location: Jacksonville, Florida
- MVP: QB Rick Trocano (Pittsburgh); RB George Rogers (South Carolina)
- Referee: Robert Carpenter (ACC)

United States TV coverage
- Network: ABC
- Announcers: Al Michaels (Play by Play); Ara Parseghian (Color); Steve Davis (Sideline)

The 1980 Gator Bowl was an American college football bowl game played on December 29, 1980, at Gator Bowl Stadium in Jacksonville, Florida. The game pitted the Pittsburgh Panthers and the South Carolina Gamecocks.

== Background ==
The Panthers began the season ranked #3 in the nation. Despite victories in their first four games, they managed to fall a spot before their matchup against #11 Florida State. They lost the game 36–22 to the Seminoles, falling to #11. They promptly won the next six games to finish with 10 victories in a season for the second straight season while winning the Lambert-Meadowlands Trophy. This was Pittsburgh's seventh bowl game in seven years, along with their sixth straight bowl and 2nd Gator Bowl in four seasons.

South Carolina started the season with two victories to rise to #20 in the polls before a game versus #4 USC. A 23–13 loss dropped them out, but they rebounded the following week with a victory over #17 Michigan. They rose to #14 with three more wins before facing #4 Georgia, which they lost 13–10. They finished the season 2–1, winning over The Citadel and Wake Forest but losing to Clemson. Their season was highlighted by senior running back George Rogers, who rushed for 1,781 yards (the best in the nation) while winning the Heisman Trophy. More importantly, the Gamecocks were in a bowl game for the second straight year and third time in five years, along with their first Gator Bowl appearance since 1946.

== Game summary ==
- Pittsburgh - Rick Trocano, 1 yard touchdown run (Dave Trout kick)
- Pittsburgh - Trout, 35 yard field goal
- South Carolina - Eddie Leopard, 39 yard field goal
- Pittsburgh - Willie Collier, 3 yard touchdown pass from Dan Marino (Trout kick)
- Pittsburgh - Trout, 25 yard field goal
- Pittsburgh - Randy McMillan, 3 yard touchdown run (Trout kick)
- Pittsburgh - McMillan, 42 yard touchdown pass from Trocano (Trout kick)
- Pittsburgh - Trout, 29 yard field goal
- South Carolina - Tim Gillespie, 14 yard touchdown pass from Gordon Beckham (kick failed)

Rick Trocano was named MVP for Pittsburgh, passing 10-of-21 for 155 yards while rushing for a touchdown. George Rogers was named MVP for South Carolina, rushing for 113 yards on 27 carries. Pittsburgh outrushed South Carolina 165 to 116 and outpassed them 233 to 168. The Gamecocks had five turnovers; the Panthers had four turnovers. There were ten combined punts, for an average of around 30 yards.

== Aftermath ==
The Panthers reached five more bowl games in the decade (though no Gator Bowls), while the Gamecocks reached three more bowl games in the decade, including a Gator Bowl appearance in 1987. It would take 15 more years for South Carolina to record their first bowl win.
