= 1980 Clemson Tigers football team =

American college football season

1980 Clemson Tigers football
- Conference: Atlantic Coast Conference
- Record: 6–5 (2–4 ACC)
- Head coach: Danny Ford (2nd full, 3rd overall season)
- Offensive coordinator: Nelson Stokley (1st season)
- Defensive coordinator: Mickey Andrews (4th season)
- Captains: Lee Nanney; Willie Underwood
- Home stadium: Memorial Stadium

1980 Atlantic Coast Conference football standings
	Conf.					Overall
Team	W		L		T	W		L		T
No. 10 North Carolina $	6	–	0	–	0	11	–	1	–	0
Maryland	5	–	1	–	0	8	–	4	–	0
NC State	3	–	3	–	0	6	–	5	–	0
Clemson	2	–	4	–	0	6	–	5	–	0
Wake Forest	2	–	4	–	0	5	–	6	–	0
Virginia	2	–	4	–	0	4	–	7	–	0
Duke	1	–	5	–	0	2	–	9	–	0
$ – Conference champion; Rankings from AP Poll

The 1980 Clemson Tigers football team was an American football team that represented Clemson University as a member of the Atlantic Coast Conference (ACC) during the 1980 NCAA Division I-A football season. In their third season under head coach Danny Ford, the Tigers compiled a 6–5 record (2–4 in conference games), tied for fourth place in the ACC, and was outscored by a total of 222 to 217. The team won the 100th ACC game in Clemson history on November 1 and played its home games at Memorial Stadium in Clemson, South Carolina.

Lee Nanney and Willie Underwood were the team captains. The team's statistical leaders included quarterback Homer Jordan with 1,311 passing yards, Chuck McSwain with 544 rushing yards, Perry Tuttle with 915 receiving yards, and placekicker Obed Ariri with 87 points scored (23 field goals, 18 extra points).

== Schedule ==
Date	Time	Opponent	Site	Result	Attendance	Source
September 13	1:00 p.m.	Rice*	Memorial Stadium; Clemson, SC	W 19–3	60,361	
September 20	1:30 p.m.	at No. 10 Georgia*	Sanford Stadium; Athens, GA (rivalry)	L 16–20	61,200	
September 27	1:00 p.m.	Western Carolina*	Memorial Stadium; Clemson, SC	W 17–10	58,490	
October 4	1:00 p.m.	Virginia Tech*^{†}	Memorial Stadium; Clemson, SC	W 13–10	64,558	
October 11	1:30 p.m.	at Virginia	Scott Stadium; Charlottesville, VA	W 27–24	32,443	
October 18	1:00 p.m.	Duke	Memorial Stadium; Clemson, SC	L 17–34	59,873	
October 25	1:00 p.m.	at NC State	Carter–Finley Stadium; Raleigh, NC (rivalry)	L 20–24	44,400	
November 1	1:00 p.m.	at Wake Forest	Groves Stadium; Winston-Salem, NC	W 35–33	28,200	
November 8	1:00 p.m.	No. 14 North Carolina	Memorial Stadium; Clemson, SC	L 19–24	62,500	
November 15	1:20 p.m.	at Maryland	Byrd Stadium; College Park, MD	L 7–34	32,650	
November 22	1:00 p.m.	No. 14 South Carolina*	Memorial Stadium; Clemson, SC (rivalry)	W 27–6	64,200	
*Non-conference game; ^{†}Homecoming; Rankings from AP Poll released prior to the game; All times are in Eastern time

== Roster ==
1980 Clemson Tigers football team roster
Players
Coaches
Offense

Pos.	#	Name	Class
QB	3	Homer Jordan	So
WR	15	Jeff Stockstill	So
WR	22	Perry Tuttle	Jr
RB	35	Chuck McSwain	So
WR	41	Jerry Gaillard	Jr
OT	77	Lee Nanney	Jr

Defense

Pos.	#	Name	Class
DE	57	Nick Bowman	Jr
DL	66	Steve Durham	Sr
DT	71	Dan Benish	So
DT	99	Jeff Bryant	Jr

Special teams

Pos.	#	Name	Class
K	1	Obed Ariri	Sr

Head coach

- Danny Ford

Coordinators/assistant coaches

Legend

- (C) Team captain
- (S) Suspended
- (I) Ineligible
- Injured
- Redshirt

Roster
