= Amos Lawrence (American football) =

American football player (born 1958)

No. 20
- Position: Running back

Personal information
- Born: January 9, 1958 (age 68); Norfolk, Virginia, U.S.
- Listed height: 5 ft 11 in (1.80 m)
- Listed weight: 181 lb (82 kg)

Career information
- High school: Lake Taylor (Norfolk)
- College: North Carolina
- NFL draft: 1981: 4th round, 103rd overall pick

Career history
- San Diego Chargers (1981)*; San Francisco 49ers (1981–1982); Pittsburgh Maulers (1984)
- * Offseason or practice squad member only

Awards and highlights
- Super Bowl champion (XVI); ACC Rookie of the Year (1977); 2× First-team All-ACC (1977, 1980); North Carolina Tar Heels Jersey No. 20 honored

Career NFL statistics
- Rushing yards: 55
- Rushing average: 3.1
- Rushing touchdowns: 2
- Stats at Pro Football Reference

Amos Lawrence Jr. (born January 9, 1958) is an American former professional football player who was a running back for the San Francisco 49ers of the National Football League (NFL). He played college football for the North Carolina Tar Heels and was selected in the fourth round of the 1981 NFL draft.

== Early life ==
Lawrence was raised in the Diggs Park housing project in Norfolk, Virginia.

== Career ==
Lawrence was selected by the San Diego Chargers out of the University of North Carolina at Chapel Hill in the fourth round of the 1981 NFL draft. On September 10, 1981, Lawrence was traded to the San Francisco 49ers for a fourth round pick in the 1984 NFL draft.

Lawrence played sparingly for the 49ers, primarily as a kick returner. When the 49ers played in Super Bowl XVI against the Cincinnati Bengals, Lawrence fumbled the opening kickoff. While the 49ers eventually won the game, the 49ers benched him and eventually cut him during training camp before the 1983 season. Lawrence joined the Pittsburgh Maulers of the USFL in 1984 but was cut from the team after Mike Rozier was signed. He later briefly played for the USFL's Jacksonville Bulls.

After his professional career ended, Lawrence returned to Norfolk, where he worked busing tables and sorting newspapers, among other odd jobs. His high school football coach, Bert Harrell, got him a job as an attendance officer and junior varsity assistant coach at Lake Taylor High School.
