= 1980 Oklahoma Sooners football team =

American college football season

1980 Oklahoma Sooners football

Big 8 champion Orange Bowl champion

Orange Bowl, W 18–17 vs. Florida State
- Conference: Big Eight Conference

Ranking
- Coaches: No. 3
- AP: No. 3
- Record: 10–2 (7–0 Big 8)
- Head coach: Barry Switzer (8th season)
- Offensive coordinator: Galen Hall (8th season)
- Offensive scheme: Wishbone
- Defensive coordinator: Rex Norris (3rd season)
- Captains: Louis Oubre; David Overstreet; Steve Rhodes; Richard Turner; J. C. Watts
- Home stadium: Oklahoma Memorial Stadium

1980 Big Eight Conference football standings
	Conf.					Overall
Team	W		L		T	W		L		T
No. 3 Oklahoma $	7	–	0	–	0	10	–	2	–	0
No. 7 Nebraska	6	–	1	–	0	10	–	2	–	0
Missouri	5	–	2	–	0	8	–	4	–	0
Iowa State	3	–	4	–	0	7	–	4	–	0
Oklahoma State	3	–	4	–	0	4	–	7	–	0
Kansas State	2	–	5	–	0	4	–	7	–	0
Kansas	1	–	6	–	0	2	–	8	–	1
Colorado	1	–	6	–	0	1	–	10	–	0
$ – Conference champion; Rankings from AP Poll

The 1980 Oklahoma Sooners football team represented the University of Oklahoma in the 1980 NCAA Division I-A football season. Oklahoma was a member of the Big Eight Conference and played its home games in Oklahoma Memorial Stadium. The team posted a 10–2 overall record and a 7–0 conference record to earn the conference title outright under head coach Barry Switzer who took the helm in 1973. This was Switzer's eighth conference title and fifth undefeated conference record in eight seasons.

The team was led by All-Americans Terry Crouch, and Louis Oubre, After winning the conference title outright, it earned a trip to the Orange Bowl for a rematch with Florida State. During the season, it faced four ranked opponents: No. 3 Texas, No. 6 North Carolina, No. 4 Nebraska and No. 2 Florida State. The last three of these opponents finished the season ranked. It endured two early season losses against Stanford and Texas in the Red River Shootout. The Sooners finished the season with eight consecutive wins.

David Overstreet led the team in rushing with 720 yards, J. C. Watts led the team in passing with 1037 yards, Bobby Grayson led the team in receiving with 389 yards, Watts led the team in scoring with 108 points, Mike Coats led the team with 126 tackles and Gary Lowell posted 4 interceptions. The team set the current school records of 82 points and 875 total yards against Colorado.

== Schedule ==
Date	Time	Opponent	Rank	Site	TV	Result	Attendance	Source
September 13	12:30 p.m.	Kentucky*	No. 4	Oklahoma Memorial Stadium; Norman, OK		W 29–7	75,668	
September 27	1:30 p.m.	Stanford*	No. 4	Oklahoma Memorial Stadium; Norman, OK		L 14–31	75,811	
October 4	3:00 p.m.	at Colorado	No. 12	Folsom Field; Boulder, CO	ESPN	W 82–42	46,980	
October 11	11:30 a.m.	vs. No. 3 Texas*	No. 12	Cotton Bowl; Dallas, TX (Red River Shootout)	ABC	L 13–20	72,032	
October 18	1:30 p.m.	Kansas State	No. 17	Oklahoma Memorial Stadium; Norman, OK		W 35–21	74,638	
October 25	1:30 p.m.	at Iowa State	No. 17	Cyclone Stadium; Ames, IA		W 42–7	50,978	
November 1	1:30 p.m.	No. 6 North Carolina*	No. 16	Oklahoma Memorial Stadium; Norman, OK	ESPN	W 41–7	75,738	
November 8	1:30 p.m.	at Kansas	No. 11	Memorial Stadium; Lawrence, KS		W 21–19	40,150	
November 15	1:30 p.m.	Missouri	No. 10	Oklahoma Memorial Stadium; Norman, OK (rivalry)	SNI	W 17–7	75,325	
November 22	11:30 a.m.	at No. 4 Nebraska	No. 9	Memorial Stadium; Lincoln, NE (rivalry)	ABC	W 21–17	74,684	
November 29	1:30 p.m.	Oklahoma State	No. 6	Oklahoma Memorial Stadium; Norman, OK (Bedlam Series)		W 63–14	75,681	
January 1, 1981	7:00 p.m.	vs. No. 2 Florida State*	No. 4	Miami Orange Bowl; Miami, FL (Orange Bowl)	NBC	W 18–17	71,043	
*Non-conference game; Rankings from AP Poll released prior to the game; All times are in Central time

== Roster ==
1980 Oklahoma Sooners football team roster
Players
Coaches
Offense

Pos.	#	Name	Class
OT	79	Lyndie Byford	Jr
G	69	Jim Carner	Sr
G	75	Terry Crouch	Jr
OT	66	Louis Oubre	Sr
HB	22	David Overstreet	Sr
QB	7	Kelly Phelps	Jr
SE	24	Steve Rhodes	Sr
RB	4	Buster Rhymes	Fr
SE	2	Jim Rockford	Fr
QB	8	Darrell Shepard	Jr
C	73	Chuck Thomas	Fr
TE	82	Forrest Valora	Sr
QB	1	J. C. Watts	Sr
G	76	Steve Williams	So
RB	32	Stanley Wilson	So
RB	40	Chet Winters	So

Defense

Pos.	#	Name	Class
DB	31	Allen Anderson	Fr
DT	67	Keith Angel	Sr
DB	17	Basil Banks	Sr
LB	38	Thomas Benson	Fr
DL	90	John Blake	So
LB	47	Sherdeill Breathett	Sr
DE	80	Rick Bryan	Fr
DT	78	Scott Dawson	Jr
DB	33	Dwight Drane	Fr
DT	92	Keith Gary	Jr
DB	6	Steve Haworth	So
DE	41	Mike Rilley	Jr
LB	49	Jackie Shipp	Fr
DT	96	Richard Turner	Sr
DE	88	Mike Weddington	So

Special teams

Pos.	#	Name	Class
K	9	John Hoge	So
K	99	Mike Keeling	So

Head coach

- Barry Switzer

Coordinators/assistant coaches

- Gary Gibbs (LB)
- Galen Hall (OC)
- Warren Harper (LB)
- Merv Johnson (OL)
- Wendell Mosley (RB)
- Rex Norris (DC)
- Lucious Selmon (DL)

Legend

- (C) Team captain
- (S) Suspended
- (I) Ineligible
- Injured
- Redshirt

Roster

== Game summaries ==
=== Kentucky ===
Team	1	2	3	4	Total
Kentucky	7	0	0	0	7
• Oklahoma	0	0	7	22	29

- Date: September 13
- Location: Oklahoma Memorial Stadium, Norman, Oklahoma
- Game attendance: 74,852

Scoring summary
1	KEN	Campbell 8 yard pass from Henry (Griggs kick)	Kentucky 7–0
3	OKLA	Winters 13 yard run (Keeling kick)	Tie 7–7
4	OKLA	Overstreet 3 yard run (Keeling kick)	Oklahoma 14–7
4	OKLA	Safety, intentional grounding in end zone	Oklahoma 16–7
4	OKLA	Watts 12 yard run (kick failed)	Oklahoma 22–7
4	OKLA	Grayson 74 yard pass from Watts (Keeling kick)	Oklahoma 29–7

=== At Nebraska ===
#9 Oklahoma at #4 Nebraska

Team	1	2	3	4	Total
• #9 Oklahoma	0	14	0	7	21
#4 Nebraska	10	0	0	7	17

- Date: November 22
- Location: Memorial Stadium, Lincoln, Nebraska
- Game attendance: 76,322

=== Oklahoma State ===
Oklahoma State Cowboys at #6 Oklahoma Sooners

Team	1	2	3	4	Total
Oklahoma State	0	7	7	0	14
• #6 Oklahoma	14	14	21	14	63

- Date: Saturday, November 29
- Location: Oklahoma Memorial Stadium, Norman, Oklahoma

Scoring summary
1	OU	Rhymes 66-yard run (Keeling kick)	OU 7-0
1	OU	Watts 22-yard run (Keeling kick)	OU 14-0
2	OU	Watts 5-yard run (Keeling kick)	OU 21-0
2	OU	Watts 5-yard run (Keeling kick)	OU 28-0
2	OSU	Spencer recovered blocked punt in end zone (Ankerson kick)	OU 28-7
3	OU	Watts 15-yard run (Keeling kick)	OU 35-7
3	OU	Shepard 1-yard run (Keeling kick)	OU 42-7
3	OSU	Campbell 11-yard pass from Treber (Ankerson kick)	OU 42-14
3	OU	J. Ledbetter 95-yard kickoff return (Keeling kick)	OU 49-14
4	OU	J. Ledbetter 1-yard run (Keeling kick)	OU 56-14
4	OU	J. Ledbetter 24-yard run (Keeling kick)	OU 63-14

== Awards and honors ==
- All-American: Terry Crouch, and Louis Oubre,

== Rankings ==
Ranking movements Legend: ██ Increase in ranking ██ Decrease in ranking ( ) = First-place votes
	Week															
Poll	Pre	1	2	3	4	5	6	7	8	9	10	11	12	13	14	Final
AP	5 (1)	4	3	4	12	12	17	17	16	11	10	9	6	5	4	3
Coaches Poll	3 (1)	3 (1)	3	4	12	12	18	17	16	11	11	9	6	5	4	3

== Postseason ==
=== NFL draft ===
The following players were drafted into the National Football League following the season.

Round	Pick	Player	Position	NFL team
1	13	David Overstreet	Running back	Miami Dolphins
1	17	Keith Gary	Defensive end	Pittsburgh Steelers
4	88	Steve Rhodes	Wide receiver	St. Louis Cardinals
4	105	Richard Turner	Defensive tackle	Green Bay Packers
5	112	Louis Oubre	Tackle	New Orleans Saints
8	204	Ken Sitton	Defensive back	Baltimore Colts
8	213	J. C. Watts	Quarterback	New York Jets
11	282	Forrest Valora	Quarterback	Green Bay Packers
