= 1980 Kansas Jayhawks football team =

American college football season

1980 Kansas Jayhawks football
- Conference: Big Eight Conference
- Record: 4–5–2 (3–3–1 Big 8)
- Head coach: Don Fambrough (6th season)
- Captains: Harry Sydney; Frank Wattlelet
- Home stadium: Memorial Stadium

1980 Big Eight Conference football standings
	Conf.					Overall
Team	W		L		T	W		L		T
No. 3 Oklahoma $	7	–	0	–	0	10	–	2	–	0
No. 7 Nebraska	6	–	1	–	0	10	–	2	–	0
Missouri	5	–	2	–	0	8	–	4	–	0
Iowa State	3	–	4	–	0	7	–	4	–	0
Oklahoma State	3	–	4	–	0	4	–	7	–	0
Kansas State	2	–	5	–	0	4	–	7	–	0
Kansas	1	–	6	–	0	2	–	8	–	1
Colorado	1	–	6	–	0	1	–	10	–	0
$ – Conference champion; Rankings from AP Poll

The 1980 Kansas Jayhawks football team represented the University of Kansas in the Big Eight Conference during the 1980 NCAA Division I-A football season. In their sixth season under head coach Don Fambrough, the Jayhawks compiled a 4–5–2 record (3–3–1 against conference opponents), and were outscored by opponents by a combined total of 208 to 171. They played their home games at Memorial Stadium in Lawrence, Kansas.

The team's statistical leaders included Frank Seurer with 797 passing yards, Kerwin Bell with 1,114 rushing yards, and David Verser with 576 receiving yards. Harry Sydney and Frank Wattlelet were the team captains.

In October 1982, an NCAA investigation revealed that running back Kerwin Bell was not an eligible player for the 1980 and 1981 seasons due to not surpassing the 2.0 minimum high school GPA. The Big Eight Conference ruled that all Kansas games in which Bell played were to be forfeited, bringing their conference record to 1–6 on the year. However, Kansas still records these games as victories in their record book, including their 20–18 victory over rival Kansas State. The two schools dispute the overall series record because of this.

== Schedule ==
Date	Opponent	Site	Result	Attendance	Source
September 13	at Oregon*	Autzen Stadium; Eugene, OR	T 7–7	27,750	
September 20	No. 5 Pittsburgh*	Memorial Stadium; Lawrence, KS	L 3–18	41,300	
September 27	Louisville*	Memorial Stadium; Lawrence, KS	L 9–17	32,800	
October 4	at Syracuse*	Carrier Dome; Syracuse, NY	W 23–8	43,126	
October 11	No. 10 Nebraska	Memorial Stadium; Lawrence, KS (rivalry)	L 0–54	50,268	
October 18	No. 19 Iowa State^{†}	Memorial Stadium; Lawrence, KS	W 28–17	30,000	
October 25	at Oklahoma State	Lewis Field; Stillwater, OK	T 14–14	41,000	
November 1	at Kansas State	KSU Stadium; Manhattan, KS (Sunflower Showdown)	W 20–18	43,276	
November 8	No. 11 Oklahoma	Memorial Stadium; Lawrence, KS	L 19–21	40,150	
November 15	at Colorado	Folsom Field; Boulder, CO	W 42–3	24,187	
November 22	at Missouri	Faurot Field; Columbia, MO (Border War)	L 6–31	64,356	
*Non-conference game; ^{†}Homecoming; Rankings from AP Poll released prior to the game

== Roster ==
1980 Kansas Jayhawks football team roster
Players
Coaches
Offense

Pos.	#	Name	Class
WR	23	Russ Bastin	So
RB	4	Kerwin Bell	Fr
QB	16	Mike Bohn	So
FB	41	Brad Butts	So
WR	20	Wayne Capers	So
C	58	Bob Fiss	Sr
RB	39	E. J. Jones	Fr
RB	44	Larry Kemp	Sr
TE	80	Mike Kennaw	Sr
G	62	David Lawrence	Jr
RB	34	Walter Mack	Jr
WR	3	Lester Mickens	Sr
G	69	Fred Osborn	Sr
QB	15	Mike Phipps	So
TE	90	Jeff Schleicher	So
QB	10	Frank Seurer	Fr
OT	76	Reggie Smith	Fr
QB	12	Steve Smith	Jr
RB	24	Harry Sydney	Sr
WR	89	David Verser	Sr
RB	26	Garfield Taylor	Fr
OT	71	Dave Wessling	So
OT	79	Bobby Whitten	Sr

Defense

Pos.	#	Name	Class
LB	47	Marky Alexander	Fr
DL	60	Al Bertsch	So
DL	84	Gary Coleman	So
LB	45	Scott Connors	Fr
DL	73	Hilton Dawson	Sr
DT	95	Jeff Fox	Sr
DL	65	Stan Gardner	Sr
FS	1	Robert Gentry	So
CB	43	Dave Harris	Sr
CB	33	John McCarroll	Sr
CB	35	Robert McNeely	Jr
LB	81	Kyle McNorton	Jr
LB	38	David Mehrer	So
CB	31	Delvin Miller	Sr
CB	32	Elvis Patterson	Fr
DT	77	Greg Smith	Jr
LB	64	Chris Toburen	Jr
CB	41	Joe Tumpich	Sr
DB	5	Dan Wagoner	Jr
S	40	Frank Wattelet	Sr
S	46	Brad Vignatelli	Jr

Special teams

Pos.	#	Name	Class
K	2	Bruce Kallmeyer	Fr
P	8	Bucky Scribner	So

Head coach

- Don Fambrough (6th year)

Coordinators/assistant coaches

Legend

- (C) Team captain
- (S) Suspended
- (I) Ineligible
- Injured
- Redshirt
