= Gradkowski =

Gradkowski/ Grądkowski (feminine: Gradkowska/ Grądkowska, plural: Gradkowscy/ Grądkowscy) is a Polish surname. Notable people with the name include:

- Aleksander Grądkowski (1916–1978), Polish boxer
- Bruce Gradkowski (born 1983), American football quarterback
- Grażyna Grądkowska (born 1952), Polish sculpturist
- Gino Gradkowski (born 1988), American football center
- Henryk Gradkowski, Polish philosopher
- Mark Gradkowski, 1980 Indiana State Sycamores football team, All-Missouri Valley Conference
