= 1980 Sun Bowl =

Annual NCAA football game

Mississippi State Bulldogs	Nebraska Cornhuskers
(9–2)	(9–2)
SEC	Big Eight
17	31
Head coach: Emory Bellard	Head coach: Tom Osborne
AP / Coaches; 17 / 17	AP / Coaches; 8 / 9
	1	2	3	4	Total
Mississippi State	0	0	3	14	17
Nebraska	7	10	7	7	31
- Date: December 27, 1980
- Season: 1980
- Stadium: Sun Bowl
- Location: El Paso, Texas
- MVP: Jeff Quinn (QB, Nebraska)
- Favorite: Nebraska by 13½ points
- Referee: Gene Wurtz (WAC)
- Attendance: 34,723

United States TV coverage
- Network: CBS
- Announcers: Pat Summerall; Tom Brookshier; Frank Glieber

The 1980 Sun Bowl was a college football postseason bowl game played on December 27 in El Paso, Texas, between the Nebraska Cornhuskers and the Mississippi State Bulldogs.

== Background ==
An all-too-familiar loss to #9 Oklahoma in the regular season finale cost the Cornhuskers the Big Eight Conference title and an Orange Bowl invitation, and they settled for the Sun Bowl.

The Bulldogs finished third in the Southeastern Conference behind eventual national champion Georgia and Alabama in Emory Bellard's second year as head coach, closing the regular season on a five-game winning streak. Among those November victories were a 6–3 defeat of two-time defending national champion Alabama, a 55–31 rout of LSU, and a conquest of archrival Ole Miss in the Egg Bowl. All three of those big victories came at Mississippi Veterans Memorial Stadium in Jackson.

== Game summary ==
Todd Brown gave Nebraska an early 7–0 lead with his 23–yard touchdown run 2:30 into the game. The Huskers scored twice in the second quarter in a span of 86 seconds on a Kevin Seibel field goal from 22 yards and an eight-yard touchdown pass from Jeff Quinn to tight end Jeff Finn; the score was 17–0 at halftime.

Dana Moore narrowed the lead with his 47-yard field goal with 7:12 left in the third quarter, but Nebraska responded less than five minutes later on Andra Franklin's two-yard touchdown run to make it 24–3 at the end of three quarters.

John Bond scored the Bulldogs' first touchdown from a yard out with 11:44 remaining, but Tim McCrady caught a touchdown pass of 52 yards from Quinn and it was it 31–10 with 3:21 left. Michael Haddix ended the scoring at 31–17 with his 11-yard touchdown reception with a minute remaining, and Nebraska won by fourteen. Quinn was 9-of-19 for 151 yards with an interception and two touchdown passes en route to being named MVP. The Cornhusker defense forced two interceptions, four lost fumbles, and a muffed punt.

Nebraska climbed to seventh in the final AP poll and Mississippi State fell to nineteenth.

The attendance of 34,723 was a Sun Bowl record, aided by favorable weather.

== Scoring ==
First quarter

- Nebraska – Todd Brown 23 run (Kevin Seibel kick)

Second quarter

- Nebraska – Field goal, Seibel 22
- Nebraska – Jeff Finn 8 pass from Jeff Quinn (Seibel kick)

Third quarter

- Mississippi State – Field goal, Dana Moore 47
- Nebraska – Andra Franklin 2 run (Kevin Seibel kick)

Fourth quarter

- Mississippi State – John Bond 1 run (Moore kick)
- Nebraska – Tim McCrady 52 pass from Quinn (Klein kick)
- Mississippi State – Michael Haddix 11 pass from Bond (Moore kick)

== Statistics ==
Statistics	Mississippi State	Nebraska
First downs	15	16
Rushes–yards	53–156	56–161
Passing yards	102	159
Total yards	258	320
Passes (C–A–I)	7–19–2	9–19–1
Fumbles–lost	5–4	1–1
Turnovers by	6	2
Penalties–yards	5–50	8–42
