= 1980 Independence Bowl =

Southern Miss Golden Eagles	McNeese State Cowboys
(8–3)	(10–1)
Independent	Southland Conference
16	14
Head coach: Bobby Collins	Head coach: Ernie Duplechin
	1	2	3	4	Total
Southern Miss	10	0	0	6	16
McNeese State	0	7	7	0	14
- Date: December 13, 1980
- Season: 1980
- Stadium: Independence Stadium
- Location: Shreveport, Louisiana
- MVP: QB Stephen Starring, McNeese State; NG Jearld Baylis, Southern Miss
- Attendance: 42,600

United States TV coverage
- Network: Mizlou

The 1980 Independence Bowl was a college football postseason bowl game between the McNeese State Cowboys and the Southern Miss Golden Eagles.

== Background ==
Once again, the Cowboys were champions of the Southland Conference and were thus invited to their third Independence bowl in four years. The Golden Eagles were in their first bowl game since 1958. This was the final year of the agreement between the Bowl and the Southland Conference.

== Game summary ==
Winston Walker gave the Golden Eagles a 3–0 lead on his 36-yard field goal. Cleom Terrell made it 10–0 on his 14-yard run for a touchdown. The Cowboys responded in the next two quarters with a Buford Jordan touchdown run and a Stephan Starring touchdown run to give them a 14–10 lead going into the final quarter. Mike Woodard gave Southern Miss the go-ahead lead on his one-yard touchdown plunge as the Golden Eagles held on to win. Despite outgaining Southern Miss on yards, the Cowboys' four turnovers (compared to Southern Miss' two) doomed the team. In an MVP (but losing) effort, Stephen Starring threw 6-of-12 for 129 yards and ran for 82 yards on 23 carries for McNeese State.

== Aftermath ==
McNeese State did not win another conference title until 1991, but by this point the conference had dropped below Division I-A (now FBS). This remains their final bowl game. Southern Miss returned to the Independence Bowl in 1988.

== Statistics ==
Statistics	Southern Miss	McNeese State
First downs	14	14
Rushing yards	181	262
Passing yards	69	139
Interceptions	1	0
Total Net Yards	250	401
Fumbles–lost	1–1	4–4
Penalties–yards	8–75	4–35
Punts–average	8–44.5	5–37.4
