= Rey Dempsey =

American football player and coach (born 1936)

Biographical details
- Born: September 20, 1936 (age 90); East Pittsburgh, Pennsylvania, U.S.

Playing career
- 1954–1957: Geneva
- Position: Quarterback

Coaching career (HC unless noted)
- 1958–1960: Hopewell HS (PA) (assistant)
- 1961–1964: East Palestine HS (OH)
- 1965–1970: Central Catholic HS (OH)
- 1971–1972: Bowling Green (OL)
- 1973–1974: Youngstown State
- 1975: Detroit Lions (ST)
- 1976–1983: Southern Illinois
- 1984–1985: Memphis State

Head coaching record
- Overall: 73–57–3 (college); 54–43–3 (high school)
- Tournaments: 0–1 (NCAA D-II playoffs); 3–0 (NCAA D-I-AA playoffs)

Accomplishments and honors

Championships
- 1 NCAA Division I-AA (1983)

Awards
- AFCA NCAA Division I-AA Coach of the Year (1983)

Rey Dempsey (born September 20, 1936) is an American former football coach. He served as the head football coach at Youngstown State University from 1973 to 1974, Southern Illinois University from 1976 to 1983, and Memphis State University—now known as the University of Memphis—from 1984 to 1985, compiling a career college football record of 73–57–3. In 1975, he was a special teams coach for the Detroit Lions of the National Football League (NFL). In 1983, his Southern Illinois team went 13–1, the best record in school history, winning the 1983 NCAA Division I-AA Football Championship Game.

== Early life and playing career ==
Dempsey was born in East Pittsburgh, Pennsylvania and raised in nearby Pitcairn. In high school, he captained his school's football, basketball, and baseball team. His football coach was Chuck Klausing, who later served as head football coach at Indiana University of Pennsylvania and Carnegie Mellon University and was an assistant coach at the University of West Virginia and the University of Pittsburgh.

Dempsey attended Geneva College in Beaver Falls, Pennsylvania. There he lettered in football, basketball, and baseball. He played quarterback on the Geneva Golden Tornadoes football team under head coach Byron E. Morgan.

== Coaching career ==
=== High school and Bowling Green ===
Dempsey began his coaching career as an assistant football coach at Hopewell High School in Hopewell Township in Beaver County, Pennsylvania. There he worked for three years under Bill McDonald, who later served as head coach at Edinboro University of Pennsylvania. In 1960, Dempsey got his first head coaching job, at East Palestine High School in East Palestine, Ohio. His record there was 21–18–1 in four seasons. Dempsey moved on to Central Catholic High School, in Perry Township, Stark County, Ohio near Canton, in 1965. His record was 33–25–2 in six seasons at Central Catholic. His 1970 team shut out eight of their ten opponents. Dempsey then moved to the college ranks, working as an assistant football coach at Bowling Green State University in 1971 and 1972 He coached the offensive line under head coach Don Nehlen.

=== Youngstown State ===
Dempsey was appointed as head football coach at Youngstown State University in January 1973. He succeeded Dike Beede, who helmed the Youngstown State Penguins football program from its inception in 1938 until his retirement following the 1972 season. Beede died in drowning accident in December 1972. Dempsey was selected for the Youngtown State post over two other finalists: Bo Rein, who later served as head coach at North Carolina State University, from 1976 to 1979, and Bob Commings, who was the head coach at the University of Iowa from 1974 to 1978.

=== Southern Illinois ===
Dempsey was the 14th head football coach at Southern Illinois University and he held that position for eight seasons, from 1976 until 1983. In his final season, the Salukis won the Division I-AA (now FCS) national championship. His overall coaching record at Southern Illinois was 54–37 This ranks him third at Southern Illinois in total wins and second in winning percentage.

=== Memphis State ===
At Memphis State in NCAA Division I-A for the 1984 and 1985 seasons, Dempsey's teams went a combined 7–12–3.

== Personal life ==
From 1991 to 2002, Dempsey served as senior pastor of Christ the King Church. Dempsey now works alongside Mike Gottfried with the Team Focus program, a leadership camp for fatherless boys. He has been involved in the program since its founding in 2000 and continues to act as the camp pastor and director of spiritual development, providing lectures and sermons.

== Head coaching record ==
=== College ===
Year	Team	Overall	Conference	Standing	Bowl/playoffs	NCAA^{#}
Youngstown State Penguins (NCAA Division II independent) (1973–1974)
1973	Youngstown State	4–6				
1974	Youngstown State	8–2			L NCAA Division II Quarterfinal	
Youngstown State:		12–8				
Southern Illinois Salukis (NCAA Division I independent) (1976)
1976	Southern Illinois	7–4				
Southern Illinois Salukis (Missouri Valley Conference) (1977–1983)
1977	Southern Illinois	3–8	0–5	7th		
1978	Southern Illinois	7–4	3–2	3rd		
1979	Southern Illinois	8–3	4–1	2nd		
1980	Southern Illinois	3–8	1–5	7th		
1981	Southern Illinois	7–4	5–2	3rd		
1982	Southern Illinois	6–5	4–1	T–2nd		
1983	Southern Illinois	13–1	4–1	2nd	W NCAA Division I-AA Championship	1
Southern Illinois:		54–37	21–17			
Memphis State Tigers (NCAA Division I-A Independent) (1984–1985)
1984	Memphis State	5–5–1				
1985	Memphis State	2–7–2				
Memphis State:		7–12–3				
Total:		73–57–3				
National championship Conference title Conference division title or championship game berth
