= 1980 Southern Illinois Salukis football team =

American college football season

1980 Southern Illinois Salukis football
- Conference: Missouri Valley Conference
- Record: 3–8 (1–5 MVC)
- Head coach: Rey Dempsey (5th season)
- Home stadium: McAndrew Stadium

1980 Missouri Valley Conference football standings
	Conf.					Overall
Team	W		L		T	W		L		T
Tulsa $	4	–	1	–	0	8	–	3	–	0
Wichita State	4	–	1	–	1	5	–	5	–	1
Indiana State	4	–	2	–	0	6	–	5	–	0
Drake	3	–	2	–	0	8	–	3	–	0
West Texas State	2	–	4	–	0	5	–	6	–	0
New Mexico State	1	–	4	–	1	3	–	7	–	1
Southern Illinois	1	–	5	–	0	3	–	8	–	0
$ – Conference champion

The 1980 Southern Illinois Salukis football team was an American football team that represented Southern Illinois University (now known as Southern Illinois University Carbondale) in the Missouri Valley Conference (MVC) during the 1980 NCAA Division I-A football season. Under fifth-year head coach Rey Dempsey, the team compiled a 3–8 record. The team played its home games at McAndrew Stadium in Carbondale, Illinois.

== Schedule ==
Date	Opponent	Site	Result	Attendance	Source
September 6	at Wichita State	Cessna Stadium; Wichita, KS	L 14–31	19,252	
September 13	Eastern Illinois*	McAndrew Stadium; Carbondale, IL	W 37–35	17,150	
September 20	at New Mexico State	Aggie Memorial Stadium; Las Cruces, NM	L 17–18	15,484	
September 27	at Drake	Drake Stadium; Des Moines, IA	W 34–28	12,750	
October 4	Northern Illinois*	McAndrew Stadium; Carbondale, IL	L 17–20	15,700	
October 11	at Indiana State	Memorial Stadium; Terre Haute, IN	L 6–19	18,293	
October 18	at Illinois State	Hancock Stadium; Normal, IL	W 42–0	13,369	
November 1	at Southwestern Louisiana*	Cajun Field; Lafayette, LA	L 3–21	13,103	
November 8	Fresno State*	McAndrew Stadium; Carbondale, IL	L 14–31	9,800	
November 15	Tulsa	McAndrew Stadium; Carbondale, IL	L 7–41	6,432	
November 22	West Texas State	McAndrew Stadium; Carbondale, IL	L 20–23	894	
*Non-conference game

== Roster ==
1980 Southern Illinois Salukis football team roster
Players
Coaches
Offense

Pos.	#	Name	Class
QB	7	John Cernak	Sr
QB	16	Rick Johnson	Fr

Defense

Pos.	#	Name	Class
LB	56	Fabray Collins	Fr
DE	87	John Harper	So

Special teams

Pos.	#	Name	Class

Head coach

- Rey Dempsey

Coordinators/assistant coaches

Legend

- (C) Team captain
- (S) Suspended
- (I) Ineligible
- Injured
- Redshirt
