= 1980 Central Michigan Chippewas football team =

American college football season

1980 Central Michigan Chippewas football

MAC champion
- Conference: Mid-American Conference
- Record: 9–2 (7–2 MAC)
- Head coach: Herb Deromedi (3rd season)
- MVP: Chuck Stiver
- Home stadium: Perry Shorts Stadium

1980 Mid-American Conference football standings
	Conf.					Overall
Team	W		L		T	W		L		T
Central Michigan $	7	–	2	–	0	9	–	2	–	0
Western Michigan	6	–	3	–	0	7	–	4	–	0
Northern Illinois	4	–	3	–	0	7	–	4	–	0
Miami (OH)	4	–	3	–	0	5	–	6	–	0
Ball State	5	–	4	–	0	6	–	5	–	0
Ohio	5	–	4	–	0	6	–	5	–	0
Bowling Green	4	–	4	–	0	4	–	7	–	0
Toledo	3	–	6	–	0	4	–	7	–	0
Kent State	3	–	6	–	0	3	–	8	–	0
Eastern Michigan	1	–	7	–	0	1	–	9	–	0
$ – Conference champion

The 1980 Central Michigan Chippewas football team represented Central Michigan University in the Mid-American Conference (MAC) during the 1980 NCAA Division I-A football season. In their third season under head coach Herb Deromedi, the Chippewas compiled a 9–2 record (7–2 against MAC opponents), won the MAC championship, and outscored their opponents, 218 to 127. The team played its home games in Perry Shorts Stadium in Mount Pleasant, Michigan, with attendance of 124,533 in six home games.

The team's statistical leaders included quarterback Kevin Northup with 1,011 passing yards, Willie Todd with 659 rushing yards, and tight end Mike Hirn with 388 receiving yards. Defensive tackle Chuck Stiver received the team's most valuable player award. Five Central Michigan players (Stiver, offensive tackle Marty Smallbone, offensive guard Joe Maiorana, defensive end Kurt Dobronski, and defensive back Robert Jackson) received first-team All-MAC honors. Coach Deromedi received the MAC Coach of the Year award.

== Schedule ==
Date	Opponent	Site	Result	Attendance	Source
September 6	Ball State	Perry Shorts Stadium; Mount Pleasant, MI	W 21–17		
September 13	at Miami (OH)	Miami Field; Oxford, OH	W 15–14		
September 20	Illinois State*	Perry Shorts Stadium; Mount Pleasant, MI	W 16–0	20,028	
September 27	Kent State	Perry Shorts Stadium; Mount Pleasant, MI	W 21–6		
October 4	Toledo	Perry Shorts Stadium; Mount Pleasant, MI	W 14–10		
October 11	at Ohio	Peden Stadium; Athens, OH	L 9–24		
October 18	at Northern Illinois	Huskie Stadium; DeKalb, IL	L 0–21		
October 25	Northwestern State*	Perry Shorts Stadium; Mount Pleasant, MI	W 17–0		
November 1	at Eastern Michigan	Rynearson Stadium; Ypsilanti, MI (rivalry)	W 51–15		
November 8	Bowling Green	Perry Shorts Stadium; Mount Pleasant, MI	W 32–10		
November 15	at Western Michigan	Waldo Stadium; Kalamazoo, MI (rivalry)	W 22–10		
*Non-conference game

== Roster ==
1980 Central Michigan Chippewas football team roster
Players
Coaches
Offense

Pos.	#	Name	Class
WR	15	Pat Clifford	Jr
TE	83	Mike Hirn	Jr
QB	7	Stephen Jones	So
QB	6	Bob DeMarco	Fr
QB	3	Kevin Northup	Sr
RB	32	Mark Neiderquill	Sr
TE	85	Don Pietrowski	So
G	67	Tony Vitale	Jr
RB	31	Willie Todd	Jr
WR	24	Dave Weisenburger	So

Defense

Pos.	#	Name	Class
LB	57	Ray Bentley	So
DE	37	Tom Hutchinson	Sr
S	23	Robert Jackson	Sr
DB	28	Mike McElrath	Jr
DB	16	Dave Nester	Sr
DE	49	Dan O'Brien	So

Special teams

Pos.	#	Name	Class
K	2	Novo Bojovic	So
P	14	Greg Rentschler	Sr
P	4	Jeff VanderZee	Sr

Head coach

- Herb Deromedi

Coordinators/assistant coaches

Legend

- (C) Team captain
- (S) Suspended
- (I) Ineligible
- Injured
- Redshirt

== See also ==
- 1980 in Michigan
