= 1980 Lamar Cardinals football team =

American college football season

1980 Lamar Cardinals football
- Conference: Southland Conference
- Record: 3–8 (1–4 Southland)
- Head coach: Larry Kennan (2nd season)
- Home stadium: Cardinal Stadium

1980 Southland Conference football standings
	Conf.					Overall
Team	W		L		T	W		L		T
McNeese State $	5	–	0	–	0	10	–	2	–	0
Southwestern Louisiana	4	–	1	–	0	7	–	4	–	0
UT Arlington	3	–	2	–	0	3	–	8	–	0
Louisiana Tech	2	–	3	–	0	5	–	6	–	0
Lamar	1	–	4	–	0	3	–	8	–	0
Arkansas State	0	–	5	–	0	2	–	9	–	0
$ – Conference champion

The 1980 Lamar Cardinals football team represented Lamar University as a member of the Southland Conference during the 1980 NCAA Division I-A football season. The Cardinals played their home games at Cardinal Stadium now named Provost Umphrey Stadium in Beaumont, Texas. Lamar finished the 1980 season with a 3–8 overall record and a 1–4 conference record. One highlight for the season was the highest attended game in the history of the stadium. 18,500 fans attended the September 13 game against Baylor.

== Schedule ==
Date	Opponent	Site	Result	Attendance	Source
September 6	at Texas Southern*	Robertson Stadium; Houston, TX	W 41–8	9,300	
September 13	Baylor*	Cardinal Stadium; Beaumont, TX	L 7–42	18,500	
September 20	Drake*	Cardinal Stadium; Beaumont, TX	L 7–38	12,462	
October 4	at Stephen F. Austin*	Homer Bryce Stadium; Nacogdoches, TX	W 45–21		
October 11	at Louisiana Tech	Joe Aillet Stadium; Ruston, LA	L 7–16	13,500	
October 18	Northeast Louisiana*	Cardinal Stadium; Beaumont, TX	L 6–28	500	
October 25	at Southwestern Louisiana	Cajun Field; Lafayette, LA (Sabine Shoe)	L 10–38		
November 1	at Southern Miss*	M. M. Roberts Stadium; Hattiesburg, MS	L 10–36	30,485	
November 8	Arkansas State	Cardinal Stadium; Beaumont, TX	W 23–22		
November 15	at McNeese State	Lake Charles, LA (rivalry)	L 3–35	19,768	
November 22	UT Arlington	Cardinal Stadium; Beaumont, TX	L 27–44		
*Non-conference game
