= 1980 Eastern Michigan Hurons football team =

American college football season

1980 Eastern Michigan Hurons football
- Conference: Mid-American Conference
- Record: 1–9 (1–7 MAC)
- Head coach: Mike Stock (3rd season)
- Captains: Brian Cotton; Scott Davis
- Home stadium: Rynearson Stadium

1980 Mid-American Conference football standings
| | Conf. | | | | | Overall |
| Team | W | | L | | T | W | | L | | T |
|---|---|---|---|---|---|---|---|---|---|---|
| Central Michigan $ | 7 | – | 2 | – | 0 | 9 | – | 2 | – | 0 |
| Western Michigan | 6 | – | 3 | – | 0 | 7 | – | 4 | – | 0 |
| Northern Illinois | 4 | – | 3 | – | 0 | 7 | – | 4 | – | 0 |
| Miami (OH) | 4 | – | 3 | – | 0 | 5 | – | 6 | – | 0 |
| Ball State | 5 | – | 4 | – | 0 | 6 | – | 5 | – | 0 |
| Ohio | 5 | – | 4 | – | 0 | 6 | – | 5 | – | 0 |
| Bowling Green | 4 | – | 4 | – | 0 | 4 | – | 7 | – | 0 |
| Toledo | 3 | – | 6 | – | 0 | 4 | – | 7 | – | 0 |
| Kent State | 3 | – | 6 | – | 0 | 3 | – | 8 | – | 0 |
| Eastern Michigan | 1 | – | 7 | – | 0 | 1 | – | 9 | – | 0 |
$ – Conference champion

The 1980 Eastern Michigan Hurons football team represented Eastern Michigan University in the 1980 NCAA Division I-A football season. In their third season under head coach Mike Stock, the Hurons compiled a 1–9 record (1–7 against conference opponents), finished in last place in the Mid-American Conference, and were outscored by their opponents, 322 to 81. The team's statistical leaders included Scott Davis with 1,143 passing yards, Albert Williams with 457 rushing yards, and Jeff Dackin with 363 receiving yards.

== Schedule ==
| Date | Opponent | Site | Result | Attendance | Source |
|---|---|---|---|---|---|
| September 6 | at Western Michigan | Waldo Stadium; Kalamazoo, MI | L 0–37 | | |
| September 13 | at Bowling Green | Doyt Perry Stadium; Bowling Green, OH | W 18–16 | | |
| September 20 | Ohio | Rynearson Stadium; Ypsilanti, MI | L 6–34 | | |
| September 27 | at Toledo | Glass Bowl; Toledo, OH | L 7–49 | | |
| October 11 | at Akron * | Rubber Bowl; Akron, OH | L 10–21 | | |
| October 18 | Ball State | Rynearson Stadium; Ypsilanti, MI | L 0–26 | | |
| October 25 | at Kent State | Dix Stadium; Kent, OH | L 12–35 | | |
| November 1 | Central Michigan | Rynearson Stadium; Ypsilanti, MI (rivalry) | L 15–51 | | |
| November 8 | Illinois State *^{†} | Rynearson Stadium; Ypsilanti, MI | L 7–15 | 5,038 | |
| November 15 | at Northern Illinois | Huskie Stadium; DeKalb, IL | L 6–38 | | |
*Non-conference game; ^{†}Homecoming

== After the season ==
The following Huron was selected in the 1981 NFL draft after the season.

| Round | Pick | Player | Position | NFL club |
|---|---|---|---|---|
| 7 | 191 | Ken Miller | Defensive back | Dallas Cowboys |

== See also ==
- 1980 in Michigan
