= 1980 UT Arlington Mavericks football team =

American college football season

1980 UT Arlington Mavericks football
- Conference: Southland Conference
- Record: 3–8 (3–2 Southland)
- Head coach: Harold Elliott (7th season)
- Home stadium: Maverick Stadium

1980 Southland Conference football standings
	Conf.					Overall
Team	W		L		T	W		L		T
McNeese State $	5	–	0	–	0	10	–	2	–	0
Southwestern Louisiana	4	–	1	–	0	7	–	4	–	0
UT Arlington	3	–	2	–	0	3	–	8	–	0
Louisiana Tech	2	–	3	–	0	5	–	6	–	0
Lamar	1	–	4	–	0	3	–	8	–	0
Arkansas State	0	–	5	–	0	2	–	9	–	0
$ – Conference champion

The 1980 UT Arlington Mavericks football team was an American football team that represented the University of Texas at Arlington in the Southland Conference during the 1980 NCAA Division I-A football season. In their seventh year under head coach Harold Elliott, the team compiled a 3–8 record.

== Schedule ==
Date	Opponent	Site	Result	Attendance	Source
September 6	North Texas State*	Maverick Stadium; Arlington, TX	L 14–31	18,033	
September 13	at Northwestern State*	Harry Turpin Stadium; Natchitoches, LA	L 31–38		
September 27	at SMU*	Texas Stadium; Irving, TX	L 16–52	26,611	
October 4	Drake*	Maverick Stadium; Arlington, TX	L 20–30	6,326	
October 11	West Texas State*	Maverick Stadium; Arlington, TX	L 26–38	6,749	
October 18	New Mexico State*	Maverick Stadium; Arlington, TX	L 10–30	5,414	
October 25	at Louisiana Tech	Joe Aillet Stadium; Ruston, LA	W 21–20	13,800	
November 1	at McNeese State	Cowboy Stadium; Lake Charles, LA	L 17–31	20,034	
November 8	Southwestern Louisiana	Maverick Stadium; Arlington, TX	L 13–30	7,156	
November 15	Arkansas State	Maverick Stadium; Arlington, TX	W 36–14	2,150	
November 22	at Lamar	Cardinal Stadium; Beaumont, TX	W 44–27		
*Non-conference game
