= Ron Blackledge =

American football player and coach (born 1938)

Biographical details
- Born: April 15, 1938 (age 88); North Canton, Ohio, U.S.

Playing career

Football
- 1957–1959: Bowling Green

Baseball
- 1958–1960: Bowling Green
- Position: Third baseman (baseball)

Coaching career (HC unless noted)

Football
- 1968–1969: Ashland (OL)
- 1970–1972: Cincinnati (OL)
- 1973–1975: Kentucky (OL)
- 1976: Princeton (OL)
- 1977: Kent State (OC)
- 1978–1980: Kent State
- 1982–1991: Pittsburgh Steelers (OL)
- 1992: Indianapolis Colts (OA)
- 1993–1997: Indianapolis Colts (OL)

Head coaching record
- Overall: 8–25

Ron Blackledge (born April 15, 1938) is an American former football player and coach. He served as the head football coach at Kent State University from 1978 to 1980, compiling a record of 8–25. Blackledge then worked as an assistant coach in the National Football League (NFL), for the Pittsburgh Steelers from 1982 to 1991, and was an offensive line coach with the Indianapolis Colts from 1992 to 1997.

== Coaching career ==
Blackledge joined the Steelers in 1982 as an offensive assistant and was named offensive line coach two days later. From 1984 to 1988, he shared the offensive line coaching duties, focusing on the tackles and tight ends. He took over responsibility for the entire line in 1989. His 33 years of coaching include nine seasons at the high school level in Canton, Ohio, 14 years in college and 14 in the NFL. His first coaching position was at Canton South High School in 1960. He also coached at Timken High School and Glenwood High School in Canton before moving to Ashland College as an offensive line coach in 1968. Following two years at Ashland were stints as offensive line coach at the University of Cincinnati, the University of Kentucky, and Princeton University. He was named offensive coordinator at Kent State University in 1977. He served as that school's head coach from 1978 to 1980 before joining the Steelers. As a player, he played tight end and defensive end for Bowling Green University from 1957 to 1959. He was inducted into the school's Athletic Hall of Fame in 1972.

With the Pittsburgh Steelers, he coached two linemen to Pro Bowl seasons including: Mike Webster and Tunch Ilkin. With the Indianapolis Colts, he coached Will Wolford to a Pro Bowl season in 1995.

== Personal life ==
Blackledge is the father of former quarterback Todd Blackledge, who played for the Penn State Nittany Lions, Kansas City Chiefs and Pittsburgh Steelers.

== Head coaching record ==
=== College ===
Year	Team	Overall	Conference	Standing	Bowl/playoffs
Kent State Golden Flashes (Mid-American Conference) (1978–1980)
1978	Kent State	4–7	2–6	8th	
1979	Kent State	1–10	1–8	10th	
1980	Kent State	3–8	3–6	T–8th	
Kent State:		8–25	6–20		
Total:		8–25			
