= 1980 McNeese State Cowboys football team =

American college football season

1980 McNeese State Cowboys football

Southland champion

Independence Bowl, L 14–16 vs. Southern Miss
- Conference: Southland Conference
- Record: 10–2 (5–0 Southland)
- Head coach: Ernie Duplechin (2nd season)
- Defensive coordinator: Hubert Boales (2nd season)
- Home stadium: Cowboy Stadium

1980 Southland Conference football standings
	Conf.					Overall
Team	W		L		T	W		L		T
McNeese State $	5	–	0	–	0	10	–	2	–	0
Southwestern Louisiana	4	–	1	–	0	7	–	4	–	0
UT Arlington	3	–	2	–	0	3	–	8	–	0
Louisiana Tech	2	–	3	–	0	5	–	6	–	0
Lamar	1	–	4	–	0	3	–	8	–	0
Arkansas State	0	–	5	–	0	2	–	9	–	0
$ – Conference champion

The 1980 McNeese State Cowboys football team was an American football team that represented McNeese State University as a member of the Southland Conference during the 1980 NCAA Division I-A football season. In its second season under head coach Ernie Duplechin, the team compiled an overall record of 10–2 record with a mark of 5–0 against conference opponents, won the Southland championship, and outscored opponents by a total of 318 to 154. The team played its home games in Cowboy Stadium in Lake Charles, Louisiana.

The team concluded an undefeated season against SLC opponents and clinched the conference championship with a 14–0 shutout victory over Southwestern Louisiana on November 22, 1980.

After winning the conference championship, McNeese was invited to play in the 1980 Independence Bowl, losing to Southern Miss by a 16–14 score. McNeese led by a 14–10 score late in the fourth quarter after Southern Miss recovered a fumble at the McNeese seven-yard line. McNeese kicker Don Stump also missed field goal attempts of 37 and 42 yards.

The team's statistical leaders included sophomore quarterback Stephen Starring with 1,006 passing yards and 1,980 yards of total offense, Theron McClendon with 1,272 rushing yards, Mark Barousse with 308 receiving yards, and placekicker Don Stump with 62 points scored. Starring went on to play seven seasons, principally as a wide receiver, in the National Football League. He was inducted into the McNeese State University Hall of Fame in 2000.

== Schedule ==
Date	Opponent	Site	Result	Attendance	Source
September 6	at West Texas State*	Kimbrough Memorial Stadium; Canyon, TX	W 20–17	16,101	
September 13	at Toledo*	Glass Bowl; Toledo, OH	W 20–17	21,281	
September 20	Nicholls State*	Cowboy Stadium; Lake Charles, LA	W 21–0	20,650	
September 27	Northwestern State*	Cowboy Stadium; Lake Charles, LA (rivalry)	L 10–13		
October 4	Ball State*	Cowboy Stadium; Lake Charles, LA	W 24–7	19,879	
October 11	at Northeast Louisiana	Malone Stadium; Monroe, LA	W 48–28	16,352	
October 25	at Arkansas State	Indian Stadium; Jonesboro, AR	W 36–28	8,550	
November 1	UT Arlington	Cowboy Stadium; Lake Charles, LA	W 31–17	20,034	
November 8	at Louisiana Tech	Joe Aillet Stadium; Ruston, LA	W 45–8	19,200	
November 15	Lamar	Cowboy Stadium; Lake Charles, LA (rivalry)	W 35–3	19,768	
November 22	Southwestern Louisiana	Cowboy Stadium; Lake Charles, LA (rivalry)	W 14–0	23,789	
December 13	vs. Southern Miss*	State Fair Stadium; Shreveport, LA (Independence Bowl)	L 14–16	42,600	
*Non-conference game
