= 1980 Arkansas State Indians football team =

American college football season

1980 Arkansas State Indians football
- Conference: Southland Conference
- Record: 2–9 (0–5 Southland)
- Head coach: Larry Lacewell (2nd season)
- Home stadium: Indian Stadium

1980 Southland Conference football standings
	Conf.					Overall
Team	W		L		T	W		L		T
McNeese State $	5	–	0	–	0	10	–	2	–	0
Southwestern Louisiana	4	–	1	–	0	7	–	4	–	0
UT Arlington	3	–	2	–	0	3	–	8	–	0
Louisiana Tech	2	–	3	–	0	5	–	6	–	0
Lamar	1	–	4	–	0	3	–	8	–	0
Arkansas State	0	–	5	–	0	2	–	9	–	0
$ – Conference champion

The 1980 Arkansas State Indians football team was an American football team that represented the Arkansas State University as a member of the Southland Conference during the 1980 NCAA Division I-A football season. In their second season under head coach Larry Lacewell, the Indians compiled an overall record of 2–9 with a mark of 0–5 in conference play, placing last out of six teams in Southland.

== Schedule ==
Date	Opponent	Site	Result	Attendance	Source
September 6	Tennessee–Martin*	Indian Stadium; Jonesboro, AR	W 29–9	15,206	
September 20	Northeast Louisiana*	Indian Stadium; Jonesboro, AR	L 12–35		
September 27	at Kansas State*	KSU Stadium; Manhattan, KS	L 7–31	32,580	
October 4	at Memphis State*	Liberty Bowl Memorial Stadium; Memphis, TN (rivalry)	L 3–24	20,352	
October 11	at Southwestern Louisiana	Cajun Field; Lafayette, LA	L 0–3	16,485	
October 18	at Southern Miss*	M. M. Roberts Stadium; Hattiesburg, MS	L 0–35	21,915	
October 25	McNeese State^{†}	Indian Stadium; Jonesboro, AR	L 28–36	8,550	
November 1	Louisiana Tech	Indian Stadium; Jonesboro, AR	L 0–28	10,000	
November 8	at Lamar	Cardinal Stadium; Beaumont, TX	L 22–23		
November 15	at UT Arlington	Maverick Stadium; Arlington, TX	L 14–36	2,150	
November 22	Austin Peay*	Indian Stadium; Jonesboro, AR	W 14–9		
*Non-conference game; ^{†}Homecoming
