= 1980 Kent State Golden Flashes football team =

American college football season

1980 Kent State Golden Flashes football
- Conference: Mid-American Conference
- Record: 3–8 (3–6 MAC)
- Head coach: Ron Blackledge (3rd season)
- Home stadium: Dix Stadium

1980 Mid-American Conference football standings
	Conf.					Overall
Team	W		L		T	W		L		T
Central Michigan $	7	–	2	–	0	9	–	2	–	0
Western Michigan	6	–	3	–	0	7	–	4	–	0
Northern Illinois	4	–	3	–	0	7	–	4	–	0
Miami (OH)	4	–	3	–	0	5	–	6	–	0
Ball State	5	–	4	–	0	6	–	5	–	0
Ohio	5	–	4	–	0	6	–	5	–	0
Bowling Green	4	–	4	–	0	4	–	7	–	0
Toledo	3	–	6	–	0	4	–	7	–	0
Kent State	3	–	6	–	0	3	–	8	–	0
Eastern Michigan	1	–	7	–	0	1	–	9	–	0
$ – Conference champion

The 1980 Kent State Golden Flashes football team was an American football team that represented Kent State University in the Mid-American Conference (MAC) during the 1980 NCAA Division I-A football season. In their third season under head coach Ron Blackledge, the Golden Flashes compiled a 3–8 record (3–6 against MAC opponents), finished in eighth place in the MAC, and were outscored by all opponents by a combined total of 279 to 159.

The team's statistical leaders included Ron Pittman with 485 rushing yards, Pat Gladfelter with 745 passing yards, and Darren Brown with 419 receiving yards. Defensive back Charlie Grandjean was selected as a first-team All-MAC player.

== Schedule ==
Date	Opponent	Site	Result	Attendance	Source
September 13	at Marshall*	Fairfield Stadium; Huntington, WV	L 7–17	18,051	
September 20	at Navy*	Navy–Marine Corps Memorial Stadium; Annapolis, MD	L 3–31		
September 27	at Central Michigan	Perry Shorts Stadium; Mount Pleasant, MI	L 6–21		
October 4	Ohio	Dix Stadium; Kent, OH	W 15–14		
October 11	Western Michigan	Dix Stadium; Kent, OH	L 21–28		
October 18	at Bowling Green	Doyt Perry Stadium; Bowling Green, OH (rivalry)	L 3–24		
October 25	Eastern Michigan	Dix Stadium; Kent, OH	W 35–12		
November 1	Northern Illinois	Dix Stadium; Kent, OH	L 14–35		
November 8	at Ball State	Ball State Stadium; Muncie, IN	L 7–34		
November 15	at Miami (OH)	Miami Field; Oxford, OH	L 14–49		
November 22	Toledo	Dix Stadium; Kent, OH	W 34–14		
*Non-conference game
