= 1980 Drake Bulldogs football team =

American college football season

1980 Drake Bulldogs football
- Conference: Missouri Valley Conference
- Record: 8–3 (3–2 MVC)
- Head coach: Chuck Shelton (4th season)
- Home stadium: Drake Stadium

1980 Missouri Valley Conference football standings
	Conf.					Overall
Team	W		L		T	W		L		T
Tulsa $	4	–	1	–	0	8	–	3	–	0
Wichita State	4	–	1	–	1	5	–	5	–	1
Indiana State	4	–	2	–	0	6	–	5	–	0
Drake	3	–	2	–	0	8	–	3	–	0
West Texas State	2	–	4	–	0	5	–	6	–	0
New Mexico State	1	–	4	–	1	3	–	7	–	1
Southern Illinois	1	–	5	–	0	3	–	8	–	0
$ – Conference champion

The 1980 Drake Bulldogs football team was an American football team that represented Drake University as a member of the Missouri Valley Conference (MVC) during the 1980 NCAA Division I-A football season. In their fourth year under head coach Chuck Shelton, the Bulldogs compiled an overall record of 8–3 record with a mark of 3–2 in conference play, placing fourth in the MVC. Drake played home games at Drake Stadium in Des Moines, Iowa.

== Schedule ==
Date	Opponent	Site	Result	Attendance	Source
September 6	Indiana State	Drake Stadium; Des Moines, IA	L 10–13	9,450	
September 13	Augustana (SD)*	Drake Stadium; Des Moines, IA	W 42–0	8,056	
September 20	at Lamar*	Cardinal Stadium; Beaumont, TX	W 38–7	12,462	
September 27	Southern Illinois	Drake Stadium; Des Moines, IA	L 28–34	12,750	
October 4	at UT Arlington*	Maverick Stadium; Arlington, TX	W 30–20	6,326	
October 11	at Colorado*	Folsom Field; Boulder, CO	W 41–22	37,689	
October 18	West Texas State	Drake Stadium; Des Moines, IA	W 27–21	9,620	
October 25	at New Mexico State	Aggie Memorial Stadium; Las Cruces, NM	W 28–22	15,327	
November 1	Wichita State	Drake Stadium; Des Moines, IA	W 38–15	10,010	
November 8	Nebraska–Omaha*	Drake Stadium; Des Moines, IA	W 17–0	14,850	
November 22	at Long Beach State*	Anaheim Stadium; Anaheim, CA	L 7–21	8,158	
*Non-conference game
