= 1980 Oklahoma State Cowboys football team =

American college football season

1980 Oklahoma State Cowboys football
- Conference: Big Eight Conference
- Record: 3–7–1 (2–4–1 Big 8)
- Head coach: Jimmy Johnson (2nd season)
- Offensive coordinator: Bob Leahy (2nd season)
- Defensive coordinator: Jim Helms (2nd season)
- Home stadium: Lewis Field

1980 Big Eight Conference football standings
	Conf.					Overall
Team	W		L		T	W		L		T
No. 3 Oklahoma $	7	–	0	–	0	10	–	2	–	0
No. 7 Nebraska	6	–	1	–	0	10	–	2	–	0
Missouri	5	–	2	–	0	8	–	4	–	0
Iowa State	3	–	4	–	0	7	–	4	–	0
Oklahoma State	3	–	4	–	0	4	–	7	–	0
Kansas State	2	–	5	–	0	4	–	7	–	0
Kansas	1	–	6	–	0	2	–	8	–	1
Colorado	1	–	6	–	0	1	–	10	–	0
$ – Conference champion; Rankings from AP Poll

The 1980 Oklahoma State Cowboys football team represented Oklahoma State University in the Big Eight Conference during the 1980 NCAA Division I-A football season. In their second season under head coach Jimmy Johnson, the Cowboys compiled a 3–7–1 record (2–4–1 against conference opponents), tied for fourth place in the conference, and were outscored by opponents by a combined total of 268 to 187.

The team's statistical leaders included Ed Smith with 613 rushing yards, Jim Traber with 619 passing yards, Mel Campbell with 536 receiving yards, and placekicker Colin Ankersen with 39 points scored.

The team played its home games at Lewis Field in Stillwater, Oklahoma.

== Schedule ==
Date	Opponent	Site	Result	Attendance	Source
September 13	West Texas State*	Lewis Field; Stillwater, OK	L 19–20	48,400	
September 20	at No. 17 Arkansas*	War Memorial Stadium; Little Rock, AR	L 20–33	55,822	
October 4	Washington*	Lewis Field; Stillwater, OK	L 18–24	48,200	
October 11	No. 19 Missouri	Lewis Field; Stillwater, OK	L 7–30	48,000	
October 18	at No. 10 Nebraska	Memorial Stadium; Lincoln, NE	L 7–48	76,021	
October 25	Kansas	Lewis Field; Stillwater, OK	T 14–14	41,000	
November 1	San Diego State*	Lewis Field; Stillwater, OK	W 15–6	24,716	
November 8	Colorado^{†}	Lewis Field; Stillwater, OK	W 42–7	50,000	
November 15	at Kansas State	KSU Stadium; Manhattan, KS	W 10–0	22,370	
November 22	Iowa State	Lewis Field; Stillwater, OK	L 21–23	37,500	
November 29	at No. 6 Oklahoma	Oklahoma Memorial Stadium; Norman, OK (Bedlam Series)	L 14–63	75,681	
*Non-conference game; ^{†}Homecoming; Rankings from AP Poll released prior to the game

== Roster ==
1980 Oklahoma State Cowboys football team roster
Players
Coaches
Offense

Pos.	#	Name	Class
QB	—-	John Doerner	Sr
QB	12	Rusty Hilger	Fr
OT	74	Roger Taylor	Sr

Defense

Pos.	#	Name	Class
CB	11	Greg Hill	So
DT	94	Gary Lewis	So
DE	58	Dexter Manley	Sr
DT	95	Dean Prater	Sr

Special teams

Pos.	#	Name	Class

Head coach

- Jimmy Johnson

Coordinators/assistant coaches

- Bob Leahy – Offensive coordinator
- Pat Jones – Running backs
- Butch Davis – Wide receivers/tight ends
- Tony Wise – Offensive line
- Jim Helms – Defensive coordinator
- Dave Wannstedt – Defensive line
- Paul Jette – Linebackers
- Larry Hollton – Defensive backs
- Bert Jacobson – Assistant

Legend

- (C) Team captain
- (S) Suspended
- (I) Ineligible
- Injured
- Redshirt

== After the season ==
The 1981 NFL draft was held on April 28–29, 1981. The following Cowboys were selected.

Round	Pick	Player	Position	NFL team
3	75	Roger Taylor	Tackle	Kansas City Chiefs
5	119	Dexter Manley	Defensive end	Washington Redskins
10	271	Dean Prater	Defensive end	Cleveland Browns
