= 1980 Southwestern Louisiana Ragin' Cajuns football team =

American college football season

1980 Southwestern Louisiana Ragin' Cajuns football
- Conference: Southland Conference
- Record: 7–4 (4–1 Southland)
- Head coach: Sam Robertson (1st season)
- Home stadium: Cajun Field

1980 Southland Conference football standings
	Conf.					Overall
Team	W		L		T	W		L		T
McNeese State $	5	–	0	–	0	10	–	2	–	0
Southwestern Louisiana	4	–	1	–	0	7	–	4	–	0
UT Arlington	3	–	2	–	0	3	–	8	–	0
Louisiana Tech	2	–	3	–	0	5	–	6	–	0
Lamar	1	–	4	–	0	3	–	8	–	0
Arkansas State	0	–	5	–	0	2	–	9	–	0
$ – Conference champion

The 1980 Southwestern Louisiana Ragin' Cajuns football team was an American football team that represented the University of Southwestern Louisiana (now known as the University of Louisiana at Lafayette) in the Southland Conference during the 1980 NCAA Division I-A football season. In their first year under head coach Sam Robertson, the team compiled a 7–4 record.

== Schedule ==
Date	Opponent	Site	Result	Attendance	Source
September 9	New Mexico State*	Cajun Field; Lafayette, LA	W 14–12		
September 13	at East Carolina*	Ficklen Memorial Stadium; Greenville, NC	W 27–21	29,631	
September 20	at Fresno State*	Ratcliffe Stadium; Fresno, CA	L 14–16	12,283	
September 27	at Northeast Louisiana*	Malone Stadium; Monroe, LA (rivalry)	L 0–24	16,583	
October 4	at North Texas State*	Fouts Field; Denton, TX	L 20–22		
October 11	Arkansas State	Cajun Field; Lafayette, LA	W 3–0	16,485	
October 25	Lamar	Cajun Field; Lafayette, LA (Sabine Shoe)	W 38–10		
November 1	Southern Illinois*	Cajun Field; Lafayette, LA	W 21–3		
November 8	at UT Arlington	Maverick Stadium; Arlington, TX	W 30–13	7,156	
November 15	Louisiana Tech	Cajun Field; Lafayette, LA (rivalry)	W 27–9	22,638	
November 22	at McNeese State	Cowboy Stadium; Lake Charles, LA (Cajun Crown)	L 0–14	23,789	
*Non-conference game
