= 1980 Missouri Tigers football team =

American college football season

1980 Missouri Tigers football

Liberty Bowl, L 25–28 vs. Purdue
- Conference: Big Eight Conference
- Record: 8–4 (5–2 Big 8)
- Head coach: Warren Powers (3rd season)
- Defensive coordinator: Carl Reese (4th season)
- Home stadium: Faurot Field

1980 Big Eight Conference football standings
	Conf.					Overall
Team	W		L		T	W		L		T
No. 3 Oklahoma $	7	–	0	–	0	10	–	2	–	0
No. 7 Nebraska	6	–	1	–	0	10	–	2	–	0
Missouri	5	–	2	–	0	8	–	4	–	0
Iowa State	3	–	4	–	0	7	–	4	–	0
Oklahoma State	3	–	4	–	0	4	–	7	–	0
Kansas State	2	–	5	–	0	4	–	7	–	0
Kansas	1	–	6	–	0	2	–	8	–	1
Colorado	1	–	6	–	0	1	–	10	–	0
$ – Conference champion; Rankings from AP Poll

The 1980 Missouri Tigers football team represented the University of Missouri as a member of the Big Eight Conference (Big 8) during the 1980 NCAA Division I-A football season. Led by third-year head coach Warren Powers, the Tigers compiled an overall record of 8–4 with a mark of 5–2 in conference play, placing third in the Big 8. Missouri was invited to the Liberty Bowl, where the Tigers lost to Purdue. The team played home game at Faurot Field in Columbia, Missouri.

== Schedule ==
Date	Opponent	Rank	Site	TV	Result	Attendance	Source
September 13	New Mexico*	No. 17	Faurot Field; Columbia, MO		W 47–16	60,318	
September 20	Illinois*	No. 15	Faurot Field; Columbia, MO		W 52–7	66,306	
September 27	at San Diego State*	No. 12	San Diego Stadium; San Diego, CA		W 31–7	28,140	
October 4	No. 17 Penn State*	No. 9	Faurot Field; Columbia, MO		L 21–29	75,298	
October 11	at Oklahoma State	No. 19	Lewis Field; Stillwater, OK		W 30–7	48,000	
October 18	Colorado	No. 16	Faurot Field; Columbia, MO		W 45–7	72,333	
October 25	at Kansas State	No. 16	KSU Stadium; Manhattan, KS	ABC	W 13–3	30,610	
November 1	at No. 8 Nebraska	No. 15	Memorial Stadium; Lincoln, NE		L 16–38	76,155	
November 8	Iowa State		Faurot Field; Columbia, MO		W 14–10	67,533	
November 15	at No. 10 Oklahoma		Oklahoma Memorial Stadium; Norman, OK (rivalry)		L 7–17	75,325	
November 22	Kansas		Faurot Field; Columbia, MO (Border War)		W 31–6	64,356	
December 27	vs. No. 16 Purdue*		Liberty Bowl Memorial Stadium; Memphis, TN (Liberty Bowl)	ABC	L 25–28	53,667	
*Non-conference game; Rankings from AP Poll released prior to the game

== Roster ==
1980 Missouri Tigers football team roster
Players
Coaches
Offense

Pos.	#	Name	Class
G	64	Tom Anderson	Jr
WR	82	Ken Blair	Sr
QB	15	Phil Bradley	Sr
C	55	Brad Edelman	Jr
WR	8	Ron Fellows	Sr
TE	83	Andy Gibler	So
QB	16	Mike Hyde	So
G	69	Stan Lechner	Sr
OT	72	Howard Richards	Sr
G	60	Kevin Sadler	Sr
OT	75	Wayne Washington	Sr
RB	32	James Wilder	Sr

Defense

Pos.	#	Name	Class
LB	48	Van Darkow	Jr
LB	34	Lester Dickey	Sr
DB	29	Demetrious Johnson	So
DT	39	Randy Jostes	So
CB	9	Johnnie Poe	Sr
SS	18	Kevin Potter	So
DE	90	Wendell Ray	Sr
DT	56	Jerome Sally	Jr
DT	92	Bennie Smith	Jr
DE	96	Ray Stephens	Sr
CB	30	Bill Whitaker	Sr
FS	21	Eric Wright	Sr

Special teams

Pos.	#	Name	Class
K	3	Jeff Brockhaus	Sr

Head coach

- Warren Powers

Coordinators/assistant coaches

- Mike Price – Quarterback/wide receiver
- Billy Thornton – Running backs
- Dick Beechner – Tight ends/special teams coordinator
- John Faiman – Offensive line
- Carl Reese – Defensive coordinator
- George Wheeler – Defensive tackles
- Zaven Yaralian – Defensive backs
- Mark Heydorff – Assistant

Legend

- (C) Team captain
- (S) Suspended
- (I) Ineligible
- Injured
- Redshirt
