= Ernie Duplechin =

American football coach and administrator (c.1932–2020)

Biographical details
- Born: July 19, 1932; Oberlin, Louisiana, U.S.
- Died: December 24, 2020 (aged 88); Lake Charles, Louisiana, U.S.

Playing career

Football
- c. 1954: Louisiana College

Baseball
- c. 1954: Louisiana College
- Positions: Fullback (football); Catcher (baseball)

Coaching career (HC unless noted)

Football
- c. 1955: Ville Platte HS (LA) (assistant)
- c. 1955: Eunice HS (LA) (assistant)
- 1957–1960: Basile HS (LA) (assistant)
- 1961–1964: Basile HS (LA)
- 1965: McNeese State (GA)
- 1966–1978: McNeese State (assistant)
- 1979–1981: McNeese State

Administrative career (AD unless noted)
- 1980–1985: McNeese State

Head coaching record
- Overall: 28–6–1 (college)
- Bowls: 0–2

Accomplishments and honors

Championships
- 2 Southland (1979–1980)

Awards
- Southland Coach of the Year (1979)

Joseph Ernest Duplechin Jr. (July 19, 1932 – December 24, 2020) was an American football coach and college athletics administrator. He served as the head football coach at the McNeese State University from 1979 to 1981, compiling a record of 28–6–1. Duplechin was the athletic director at McNeese State from 1980 to 1985.

Duplechin died at the age of 88, on December 24, 2020.

== Head coaching record ==
=== College ===
Year	Team	Overall	Conference	Standing	Bowl/playoffs
McNeese State Cowboys (Southland Conference) (1979–1981)
1979	McNeese State	11–1	5–0	1st	L Independence
1980	McNeese State	10–2	5–0	1st	L Independence
1981	McNeese State	7–3–1	3–1–1	2nd	
McNeese State:		28–6–1	13–1–1		
Total:		28–6–1			
National championship Conference title Conference division title or championship game berth
