= Stan Weber =

American football quarterback

Profile
- Position: Quarterback

Career information
- High school: Goddard (Goddard, Kansas)
- College: Kansas State Wildcats (1980–1984)

Stan Weber was a quarterback for the Kansas State Wildcats football team from 1980 through 1984. He is the current color analyst for the K-State radio network. Now in his 40th year in the booth (as of the start of the 2022 season), Weber holds the longest tenure for a Kansas State radio broadcaster. In addition to his duties with the Wildcat football broadcasts, Weber also provides color commentary for K-State men's basketball games for both radio and television. He originally hails from Goddard, Kansas and was named Male Athlete of the Year and MVP of the 1980 Kansas Shrine Bowl All-Star Game by the Wichita Eagle.

At Kansas State, Weber served as captain of the 1984 team and led the Wildcats in rushing while earning academic All-America honors from the College Sports Information Directors of America (CoSIDA). Weber also held many of the K-State quarterback rushing records until the Michael Bishop and Ell Roberson eras and was once named Big Eight Player of the Week after rushing for 113 yards against number 1 Nebraska.

Weber, who graduated magna cum laude, received his bachelor's and master's degrees in accountancy from Kansas State and currently serves as Vice President - CFO of Tower Properties in Kansas City, in addition to his broadcast duties.

Weber is married to Nancy Weber, a former Kansas State cheerleader, and has four children: Stanton (a former Kansas State Football player, and current Special Teams coach at K-State), Landry (also a former Kansas State Football player), McKenzi (a former Kansas State Volleyball player), and Brittani (Tyler's wife).
