= 1980 Toledo Rockets football team =

American college football season

1980 Toledo Rockets football
- Conference: Mid-American Conference
- Record: 4–7 (3–6 MAC)
- Head coach: Chuck Stobart (4th season)
- Home stadium: Glass Bowl

1980 Mid-American Conference football standings
	Conf.					Overall
Team	W		L		T	W		L		T
Central Michigan $	7	–	2	–	0	9	–	2	–	0
Western Michigan	6	–	3	–	0	7	–	4	–	0
Northern Illinois	4	–	3	–	0	7	–	4	–	0
Miami (OH)	4	–	3	–	0	5	–	6	–	0
Ball State	5	–	4	–	0	6	–	5	–	0
Ohio	5	–	4	–	0	6	–	5	–	0
Bowling Green	4	–	4	–	0	4	–	7	–	0
Toledo	3	–	6	–	0	4	–	7	–	0
Kent State	3	–	6	–	0	3	–	8	–	0
Eastern Michigan	1	–	7	–	0	1	–	9	–	0
$ – Conference champion

The 1980 Toledo Rockets football team was an American football team that represented the University of Toledo in the Mid-American Conference (MAC) during the 1980 NCAA Division I-A football season. In their fourth season under head coach Chuck Stobart, the Rockets compiled a 4–7 record (3–6 against MAC opponents), finished in a tie for eighth place in the MAC, and were outscored by all opponents by a combined total of 190 to 187.

The team's statistical leaders included Jim Kelso with 589 passing yards, Mel Tucker with 563 rushing yards, and Rodney Achter with 269 receiving yards.

== Schedule ==
Date	Opponent	Site	Result	Attendance	Source
September 13	McNeese State*	Glass Bowl; Toledo, OH	L 17–20	21,281	
September 20	at Ball State	Ball State Stadium; Muncie, IN	L 7–27		
September 27	Eastern Michigan	Glass Bowl; Toledo, OH	W 49–7		
October 4	at Central Michigan	Perry Shorts Stadium; Mount Pleasant, MI	L 10–14		
October 11	Bowling Green	Glass Bowl; Toledo, OH (rivalry)	L 6–17		
October 18	at Western Michigan	Waldo Stadium; Kalamazoo, MI	L 7–17		
October 25	at Ohio	Peden Stadium; Athens, OH	L 9–24		
November 1	Miami (OH)	Glass Bowl; Toledo, OH	W 17–14		
November 8	Northern Illinois	Glass Bowl; Toledo, OH	W 13–6		
November 15	at Marshall*	Fairfield Stadium; Huntington, WV	W 38–10		
November 22	at Kent State	Dix Stadium; Kent, OH	L 14–34		
*Non-conference game
