= 1980 Tulsa Golden Hurricane football team =

American college football season

1980 Tulsa Golden Hurricane football

MVC champion
- Conference: Missouri Valley Conference
- Record: 8–3 (4–1 MVC)
- Head coach: John Cooper (4th season)
- Offensive coordinator: Larry Coker (1st season)
- Defensive coordinator: Mike Knoll (1st season)
- Home stadium: Skelly Stadium

1980 Missouri Valley Conference football standings
	Conf.					Overall
Team	W		L		T	W		L		T
Tulsa $	4	–	1	–	0	8	–	3	–	0
Wichita State	4	–	1	–	1	5	–	5	–	1
Indiana State	4	–	2	–	0	6	–	5	–	0
Drake	3	–	2	–	0	8	–	3	–	0
West Texas State	2	–	4	–	0	5	–	6	–	0
New Mexico State	1	–	4	–	1	3	–	7	–	1
Southern Illinois	1	–	5	–	0	3	–	8	–	0
$ – Conference champion

The 1980 Tulsa Golden Hurricane football team represented the University of Tulsa during the 1980 NCAA Division I-A football season. In their fourth year under head coach John Cooper, the Golden Hurricane compiled an 8–3 record (4–1 against conference opponents) and won the Missouri Valley Conference championship.

The team's statistical leaders included quarterback Kenny Jackson with 1,208 passing yards, Kenneth Session with 662 rushing yards, and Paul Johns with 420 receiving yards. Head coach John Cooper was later inducted into the College Football Hall of Fame.

== Schedule ==
Date	Opponent	Site	Result	Attendance	Source
September 13	Cincinnati*	Skelly Stadium; Tulsa, OK	W 31–13	19,941	
September 20	at Wichita State	Cessna Stadium; Wichita, KS	L 10–23	19,010	
September 27	at No. 15 Arkansas*	Razorback Stadium; Fayetteville, AR	L 10–13	41,082	
October 4	Kansas State*^{†}	Skelly Stadium; Tulsa, OK	W 3–0	23,213	
October 11	North Texas State*	Skelly Stadium; Tulsa, OK	W 28–27	18,315	
October 18	at TCU*	Amon G. Carter Stadium; Fort Worth, TX	W 23–17	12,367	
October 25	West Texas State	Skelly Stadium; Tulsa, OK	W 44–24	18,011	
November 1	at No. 5 Florida State*	Doak Campbell Stadium; Tallahassee, FL	L 2–45	47,683	
November 8	Indiana State	Skelly Stadium; Tulsa, OK	W 30–7	17,647	
November 15	at Southern Illinois	McAndrew Stadium; Carbondale, IL	W 41–7	6,432	
November 22	at New Mexico State	Aggie Memorial Stadium; Las Cruces, NM	W 21–20	10,081	
*Non-conference game; ^{†}Homecoming; Rankings from AP Poll released prior to the game

== Roster ==
1980 Tulsa Golden Hurricane football team roster
Players
Coaches
Offense

Pos.	#	Name	Class
OT	79	Sid Abramowitz	So
QB	7	Kenny Jackson	Jr
G	66	Dan Jacobsen	So
WR	3	Paul Johns	Sr
G	74	Denver Johnson	Sr
RB	5	Ken Lacy	So

Defense

Pos.	#	Name	Class
LB	49	Don Blackmon	Sr
DE	14	Eugene Williams	Jr

Special teams

Pos.	#	Name	Class
P	11	Steve Cook	So

Head coach

- John Cooper

Coordinators/assistant coaches

- Joe Hollis
  (Tight ends and offensive tackles)

Legend

- (C) Team captain
- (S) Suspended
- (I) Ineligible
- Injured
- Redshirt

== After the season ==
=== 1981 NFL draft ===
The following Golden Hurricane players were selected in the 1981 NFL draft following the season.

Round	Pick	Player	Position	NFL club
4	102	Don Blackmon	Linebacker	New England Patriots
8	199	Denver Johnson	Tackle	Tampa Bay Buccaneers
