= 1980 Miami Redskins football team =

American college football season

1980 Miami Redskins football
- Conference: Mid-American Conference
- Record: 5–6 (4–3 MAC)
- Head coach: Tom Reed (3rd season)
- Defensive coordinator: Tim Rose (3rd season)
- Home stadium: Miami Field

1980 Mid-American Conference football standings
	Conf.					Overall
Team	W		L		T	W		L		T
Central Michigan $	7	–	2	–	0	9	–	2	–	0
Western Michigan	6	–	3	–	0	7	–	4	–	0
Northern Illinois	4	–	3	–	0	7	–	4	–	0
Miami (OH)	4	–	3	–	0	5	–	6	–	0
Ball State	5	–	4	–	0	6	–	5	–	0
Ohio	5	–	4	–	0	6	–	5	–	0
Bowling Green	4	–	4	–	0	4	–	7	–	0
Toledo	3	–	6	–	0	4	–	7	–	0
Kent State	3	–	6	–	0	3	–	8	–	0
Eastern Michigan	1	–	7	–	0	1	–	9	–	0
$ – Conference champion

The 1980 Miami Redskins football team was an American football team that represented Miami University in the Mid-American Conference (MAC) during the 1980 NCAA Division I-A football season. In its third season under head coach Tom Reed, the team compiled a 5–6 record (4–3 against MAC opponents), finished in a tie for third place in the MAC, and outscored all opponents by a combined total of 241 to 192.

The team's statistical leaders included Mark Kelly with 517 passing yards, Greg Jones with 952 rushing yards, and Don Treadwell with 661 receiving yards.

== Schedule ==
Date	Opponent	Site	Result	Attendance	Source
September 13	Central Michigan	Miami Field; Oxford, OH	L 14–15		
September 20	at Syracuse*	Carrier Dome; Syracuse, NY	L 24–36	50,564	
September 27	at Ball State	Ball State Stadium; Muncie, IN	W 42–9		
October 4	at Purdue*	Ross–Ade Stadium; West Lafayette, IN	L 3–28	69,889	
October 11	Marshall*	Miami Field; Oxford, OH	W 34–6	15,814	
October 18	at Ohio	Peden Stadium; Athens, OH (rivalry)	L 7–17		
October 25	Bowling Green	Miami Field; Oxford, OH	W 7–3		
November 1	at Toledo	Glass Bowl; Toledo, OH	L 14–17		
November 8	Western Michigan	Miami Field; Oxford, OH	W 34–24		
November 15	Kent State	Miami Field; Oxford, OH	W 49–14		
November 22	at Cincinnati*	Nippert Stadium; Cincinnati, OH (rivalry)	L 13–23		
*Non-conference game
