= 1980 Northern Illinois Huskies football team =

American college football season

1980 Northern Illinois Huskies football
- Conference: Mid-American Conference
- Record: 7–4 (4–3 MAC)
- Head coach: Bill Mallory (1st season)
- Defensive coordinator: Joe Novak (1st season)
- MVP: Jim Latanski
- Captains: Mike Terna; Jim Hannula; Mike Pinckney; Jim Latanski
- Home stadium: Huskie Stadium

1980 Mid-American Conference football standings
	Conf.					Overall
Team	W		L		T	W		L		T
Central Michigan $	7	–	2	–	0	9	–	2	–	0
Western Michigan	6	–	3	–	0	7	–	4	–	0
Northern Illinois	4	–	3	–	0	7	–	4	–	0
Miami (OH)	4	–	3	–	0	5	–	6	–	0
Ball State	5	–	4	–	0	6	–	5	–	0
Ohio	5	–	4	–	0	6	–	5	–	0
Bowling Green	4	–	4	–	0	4	–	7	–	0
Toledo	3	–	6	–	0	4	–	7	–	0
Kent State	3	–	6	–	0	3	–	8	–	0
Eastern Michigan	1	–	7	–	0	1	–	9	–	0
$ – Conference champion

The 1980 Northern Illinois Huskies football team represented Northern Illinois University as a member of the Mid-American Conference (MAC) during 1980 NCAA Division I-A football season. Led by first-year head coach Bill Mallory, the Huskies compiled an overall record of 7–4 with a mark of 4–3 in conference play, tying for third place in the MAC. Northern Illinois played home games at Huskie Stadium in DeKalb, Illinois.

== Schedule ==
Date	Opponent	Site	Result	Attendance	Source
September 5	at Long Beach State*	Anaheim Stadium; Anaheim, CA	W 16–9	9,052	
September 13	Ball State	Huskie Stadium; DeKalb, IL (rivalry)	L 17–18		
September 20	Western Michigan	Huskie Stadium; DeKalb, IL	L 6–35		
September 27	at Ohio	Peden Stadium; Athens, OH	W 22–21		
October 4	at Southern Illinois*	McAndrew Stadium; Carbondale, IL	W 20–17	15,700	
October 11	Illinois State*	Huskie Stadium; DeKalb, IL	L 18–28	18,020	
October 18	Central Michigan	Huskie Stadium; DeKalb, IL	W 21–0		
October 25	at Wichita State*	Cessna Stadium; Wichita, KS	W 17–14	22,511	
November 1	at Kent State	Dix Stadium; Kent, OH	W 35–14		
November 8	at Toledo	Glass Bowl; Toledo, OH	L 6–13		
November 22	Eastern Michigan	Huskie Stadium; DeKalb, IL	W 38–6		
*Non-conference game
