= 1980 Ball State Cardinals football team =

American college football season

1980 Ball State Cardinals football
- Conference: Mid-American Conference
- Record: 6–5 (5–4 MAC)
- Head coach: Dwight Wallace (3rd season)
- Home stadium: Ball State Stadium

1980 Mid-American Conference football standings
| | Conf. | | | | | Overall |
| Team | W | | L | | T | W | | L | | T |
|---|---|---|---|---|---|---|---|---|---|---|
| Central Michigan $ | 7 | – | 2 | – | 0 | 9 | – | 2 | – | 0 |
| Western Michigan | 6 | – | 3 | – | 0 | 7 | – | 4 | – | 0 |
| Northern Illinois | 4 | – | 3 | – | 0 | 7 | – | 4 | – | 0 |
| Miami (OH) | 4 | – | 3 | – | 0 | 5 | – | 6 | – | 0 |
| Ball State | 5 | – | 4 | – | 0 | 6 | – | 5 | – | 0 |
| Ohio | 5 | – | 4 | – | 0 | 6 | – | 5 | – | 0 |
| Bowling Green | 4 | – | 4 | – | 0 | 4 | – | 7 | – | 0 |
| Toledo | 3 | – | 6 | – | 0 | 4 | – | 7 | – | 0 |
| Kent State | 3 | – | 6 | – | 0 | 3 | – | 8 | – | 0 |
| Eastern Michigan | 1 | – | 7 | – | 0 | 1 | – | 9 | – | 0 |
$ – Conference champion

The 1980 Ball State Cardinals football team was an American football team that represented Ball State University in the Mid-American Conference (MAC) during the 1980 NCAA Division I-A football season. In its third season under head coach Dwight Wallace, the team compiled a 6–5 record (5–4 against MAC opponents) and finished in a tie for fifth place out of ten teams in the conference. The team played its home games at Ball State Stadium in Muncie, Indiana.

The team's statistical leaders included Mark O'Connell with 1,921 passing yards, Ken Currin with 548 rushing yards, Stevie Nelson with 487 receiving yards, and Dane Fellmeth with 49 points scored.

== Schedule ==
| Date | Opponent | Site | Result | Attendance | Source |
|---|---|---|---|---|---|
| September 6 | at Central Michigan | Perry Shorts Stadium; Mount Pleasant, MI | L 17–21 | | |
| September 13 | at Northern Illinois | Huskie Stadium; DeKalb, IL (rivalry) | W 18–17 | | |
| September 20 | Toledo | Ball State Stadium; Muncie, IN | W 27–7 | | |
| September 27 | Miami (OH) | Ball State Stadium; Muncie, IN | L 9–43 | | |
| October 4 | at McNeese State* | Cowboy Stadium; Lake Charles, LA | L 7–24 | 19,879 | |
| October 18 | at Eastern Michigan | Rynearson Stadium; Ypsilanti, MI | W 26–0 | | |
| October 25 | Western Michigan | Ball State Stadium; Muncie, IN | L 15–17 | | |
| November 1 | at Bowling Green | Doyt Perry Stadium; Bowling Green, OH | L 21–24 | | |
| November 8 | Kent State | Ball State Stadium; Muncie, IN | W 34–7 | | |
| November 15 | Ohio | Ball State Stadium; Muncie, IN | W 37–18 | | |
| November 22 | Indiana State* | Ball State Stadium; Muncie, IN (Blue Key Victory Bell) | W 28–21 | 7,023 | |
*Non-conference game
