= 1980 New Mexico State Aggies football team =

American college football season

1980 New Mexico State Aggies football
- Conference: Missouri Valley Conference
- Record: 3–7–1 (1–4–1 MVC)
- Head coach: Gil Krueger (3rd season)
- Home stadium: Aggie Memorial Stadium

1980 Missouri Valley Conference football standings
	Conf.					Overall
Team	W		L		T	W		L		T
Tulsa $	4	–	1	–	0	8	–	3	–	0
Wichita State	4	–	1	–	1	5	–	5	–	1
Indiana State	4	–	2	–	0	6	–	5	–	0
Drake	3	–	2	–	0	8	–	3	–	0
West Texas State	2	–	4	–	0	5	–	6	–	0
New Mexico State	1	–	4	–	1	3	–	7	–	1
Southern Illinois	1	–	5	–	0	3	–	8	–	0
$ – Conference champion

The 1980 New Mexico State Aggies football team was an American football team that represented New Mexico State University in the Missouri Valley Conference during the 1980 NCAA Division I-A football season. In their third year under head coach Gil Krueger, the Aggies compiled a 3–7–1 record. The team played its home games at Aggie Memorial Stadium in Las Cruces, New Mexico.

== Schedule ==
Date	Opponent	Site	Result	Attendance	Source
September 6	at Southwestern Louisiana*	Cajun Field; Lafayette, LA	L 12–14		
September 13	UTEP*	Aggie Memorial Stadium; Las Cruces, NM (rivalry)	W 6–3	24,882	
September 20	Southern Illinois	Aggie Memorial Stadium; Las Cruces, NM	W 18–17	15,484	
September 27	at New Mexico*	University Stadium; Albuquerque, NM (rivalry)	L 19–52	22,543	
October 4	at West Texas State	Kimbrough Memorial Stadium; Canyon, TX	L 15–17	13,009	
October 18	at UT Arlington*	Maverick Stadium; Arlington, TX	W 30–10	5,414	
October 25	Drake	Aggie Memorial Stadium; Las Cruces, NM	L 22–28	15,327	
November 1	North Texas State*	Aggie Memorial Stadium; Las Cruces, NM	L 28–38		
November 8	at Wichita State	Cessna Stadium; Wichita, KS	T 14–14	12,252	
November 15	at Indiana State	Memorial Stadium; Terre Haute, IN	L 28–33	5,010	
November 22	Tulsa	Aggie Memorial Stadium; Las Cruces, NM	L 20–21	10,081	
*Non-conference game
