= 1980 Western Michigan Broncos football team =

American college football season

1980 Western Michigan Broncos football
- Conference: Mid-American Conference
- Record: 7–4 (6–3 MAC)
- Head coach: Elliot Uzelac (6th season)
- MVP: George Bullock
- Captains: Jim Hinkle; Bud Sitko
- Home stadium: Waldo Stadium

1980 Mid-American Conference football standings
	Conf.					Overall
Team	W		L		T	W		L		T
Central Michigan $	7	–	2	–	0	9	–	2	–	0
Western Michigan	6	–	3	–	0	7	–	4	–	0
Northern Illinois	4	–	3	–	0	7	–	4	–	0
Miami (OH)	4	–	3	–	0	5	–	6	–	0
Ball State	5	–	4	–	0	6	–	5	–	0
Ohio	5	–	4	–	0	6	–	5	–	0
Bowling Green	4	–	4	–	0	4	–	7	–	0
Toledo	3	–	6	–	0	4	–	7	–	0
Kent State	3	–	6	–	0	3	–	8	–	0
Eastern Michigan	1	–	7	–	0	1	–	9	–	0
$ – Conference champion

The 1980 Western Michigan Broncos football team represented Western Michigan University in the Mid-American Conference (MAC) during the 1980 NCAA Division I-A football season. In their sixth season under head coach Elliot Uzelac, the Broncos compiled a 7–4 record (6–3 against MAC opponents), finished in second place in the MAC, and outscored their opponents, 233 to 179. The team played its home games at Waldo Stadium in Kalamazoo, Michigan.

The team's statistical leaders included Tom George with 644 passing yards, Craig Morrow with 778 rushing yards, and Reggie Hinton with 429 receiving yards. Defensive end Jim Hinkle and tackle Bud Sitko were the team captains. Defensive back George Bullock received the team's most outstanding player award.

== Schedule ==
Date	Opponent	Site	Result	Attendance	Source
September 6	Eastern Michigan	Waldo Stadium; Kalamazoo, MI	W 37–0		
September 13	at Illinois State*	Hancock Stadium; Normal, IL	W 31–17	6,127	
September 20	at Northern Illinois	Huskie Stadium; DeKalb, IL	W 35–6		
September 27	at Michigan State*	Spartan Stadium; East Lansing, MI	L 7–33	75,123	
October 4	Bowling Green	Waldo Stadium; Kalamazoo, MI	L 14–17		
October 11	at Kent State	Dix Stadium; Kent, OH	W 28–21		
October 18	Toledo	Waldo Stadium; Kalamazoo, MI	W 17–7		
October 25	at Ball State	Ball State Stadium; Muncie, IN	W 17–15		
November 1	Ohio	Waldo Stadium; Kalamazoo, MI	W 13–7		
November 8	at Miami OH)	Miami Field; Oxford, OH	L 24–34		
November 15	Central Michigan	Waldo Stadium; Kalamazoo, MI (rivalry)	L 10–22		
*Non-conference game

== See also ==
- 1980 in Michigan
