= 1980 Louisiana Tech Bulldogs football team =

American college football season

1980 Louisiana Tech Bulldogs football
- Conference: Southland Conference
- Record: 5–6 (2–3 Southland)
- Head coach: Billy Brewer (1st season)
- Captains: Mark Buchanan; Tony Tademy
- Home stadium: Joe Aillet Stadium

1980 Southland Conference football standings
	Conf.					Overall
Team	W		L		T	W		L		T
McNeese State $	5	–	0	–	0	10	–	2	–	0
Southwestern Louisiana	4	–	1	–	0	7	–	4	–	0
UT Arlington	3	–	2	–	0	3	–	8	–	0
Louisiana Tech	2	–	3	–	0	5	–	6	–	0
Lamar	1	–	4	–	0	3	–	8	–	0
Arkansas State	0	–	5	–	0	2	–	9	–	0
$ – Conference champion

The 1980 Louisiana Tech Bulldogs football team was an American football team that represented Louisiana Tech University as a member of the Southland Conference during the 1980 NCAA Division I-A football season. In their first year under head coach Billy Brewer, the team compiled a 5–6 record. Brewer was hired as head coach in December 1979 following the dismissal of Larry Beightol after going 1–9 through the first ten games of the 1979 season.

== Schedule ==
Date	Opponent	Site	Result	Attendance	Source
September 13	at Mississippi State*	Scott Field; Starkville, MS	L 11–31	32,812	
September 20	at Southern Miss*	M. M. Roberts Stadium; Hattiesburg, MS (Rivalry in Dixie)	L 11–38	24,640	
September 27	Western Illinois*	Joe Aillet Stadium; Ruston, LA	W 42–6	18,200	
October 4	at East Tennessee State*	Memorial Center; Johnson City, TN	W 7–3	6,489	
October 11	Lamar	Joe Aillet Stadium; Ruston, LA	W 16–7	13,500	
October 18	vs. Northwestern State	State Fair Stadium; Shreveport, LA (rivalry)	W 27–23	36,000	
October 25	UT Arlington	Joe Aillet Stadium; Ruston, LA	L 20–21	13,800	
November 1	at Arkansas State	Indian Stadium; Jonesboro, AR	W 28–0	10,000	
November 8	McNeese State	Joe Aillet Stadium; Ruston, LA	L 8–45	19,200	
November 15	at Southwestern Louisiana	Cajun Field; Lafayette, LA (rivalry)	L 9–27	22,638	
November 22	at Northeast Louisiana*	Malone Stadium; Monroe, LA (rivalry)	L 14–19	15,238	
*Non-conference game
