= 1980 Nebraska Cornhuskers football team =

American college football season

1980 Nebraska Cornhuskers football

Sun Bowl champion

Sun Bowl, W 31–17 vs. Mississippi State
- Conference: Big Eight Conference

Ranking
- Coaches: No. 7
- AP: No. 7
- Record: 10–2 (6–1 Big 8)
- Head coach: Tom Osborne (8th season)
- Offensive scheme: I formation
- Defensive coordinator: Lance Van Zandt (4th season)
- Base defense: 5–2
- Home stadium: Memorial Stadium

1980 Big Eight Conference football standings
	Conf.					Overall
Team	W		L		T	W		L		T
No. 3 Oklahoma $	7	–	0	–	0	10	–	2	–	0
No. 7 Nebraska	6	–	1	–	0	10	–	2	–	0
Missouri	5	–	2	–	0	8	–	4	–	0
Iowa State	3	–	4	–	0	7	–	4	–	0
Oklahoma State	3	–	4	–	0	4	–	7	–	0
Kansas State	2	–	5	–	0	4	–	7	–	0
Kansas	1	–	6	–	0	2	–	8	–	1
Colorado	1	–	6	–	0	1	–	10	–	0
$ – Conference champion; Rankings from AP Poll

The 1980 Nebraska Cornhuskers football team represented the University of Nebraska–Lincoln in the 1980 NCAA Division I-A football season. The team was coached by Tom Osborne and played their home games in Memorial Stadium in Lincoln, Nebraska.

== Schedule ==
Date	Time	Opponent	Rank	Site	TV	Result	Attendance	Source
September 13	1:30 pm	Utah*	No. 8	Memorial Stadium; Lincoln, NE		W 55–9	75,526	
September 20	1:30 pm	Iowa*	No. 6	Memorial Stadium; Lincoln, NE (rivalry)		W 57–0	76,029	
September 27	12:50 pm	at No. 11 Penn State*	No. 3	Beaver Stadium; University Park, PA	ABC	W 21–7	84,585	
October 4	1:30 pm	No. 16 Florida State*	No. 3	Memorial Stadium; Lincoln, NE		L 14–18	76,152	
October 11	1:30 pm	at Kansas	No. 10	Memorial Stadium; Lawrence, KS (rivalry)		W 54–0	50,268	
October 18	1:30 pm	Oklahoma State^{†}	No. 10	Memorial Stadium; Lincoln, NE		W 48–7	76,021	
October 25	2:30 pm	at Colorado	No. 9	Folsom Field; Boulder, CO (rivalry)		W 45–7	51,489	
November 1	1:30 pm	No. 15 Missouri	No. 8	Memorial Stadium; Lincoln, NE (rivalry)		W 38–16	76,155	
November 8	1:30 pm	Kansas State	No. 5	Memorial Stadium; Lincoln, NE (rivalry)		W 55–8	76,121	
November 15	1:30 pm	at Iowa State	No. 4	Cyclone Stadium; Ames, IA (rivalry)		W 35–0	52,942	
November 22	11:35 am	No. 9 Oklahoma	No. 4	Memorial Stadium; Lincoln, NE (rivalry)	ABC	L 17–21	74,684	
December 27	12:30 pm	vs. No. 17 Mississippi State*	No. 8	Sun Bowl; El Paso, TX (Sun Bowl)	CBS	W 31–17	34,723	
*Non-conference game; ^{†}Homecoming; Rankings from AP Poll released prior to the game; All times are in Central time

== Roster ==
Adams, Joe #64 (Sr.) OG; Alberico, Tim (So.) SE; Alven, Robert (So.) OG; Austin, Jimmy (So.) IB; Baker, Kim #41 (Sr.) LB; Barnes, Ed (So.) LB; Bates, Phil #43 (So.) FB; Bauer, Steve (So.) DB; Beaudin, Rick (So.) MG; Beideck, John (So.) C Bell, Warren #4 (So.) DB; Bergkamp, Tim (Sr.) PK; Bess, Donnie #85 (Jr.) DE; Boll, Peter #72 (So.) OT; Brandl, Matt #58 (So.) OG; Brown, Steve (So.) DE; Brown, Todd #28 (So.) SE; Bruce, Mike #76 (Sr.) OT; Brungardt, Tim (So.) IB; Carlstrom, Tom #78 (Jr.) OT; Chandler, Rick (So.) LB; Clark, David #63 (Sr.) DT; Cook, Bill (So.) DT; Corbeil, Jim (So.) DB; Craig, Roger #21 (So.) IB; Curry, Tom (So.) WB; Damkroger, Steve #35 (So.) LB; Daniels, Richard (So.) DB; Davies, Steve #82 (Sr.) TE; DeLoach, Trey #52 (Sr.) C Derr, Robin (So.) MG; Dhein, Doug (So.) OT; Eberspacher, Rex (So.) PK; Engebritson, Monte (So.) TE; England, Gary #70 (Sr.) OG; Evans, Brent #48 (Jr.) LB; Felici, Tony (So.) DE; Finn, Jeff #87 (Sr.) TE; Fischer, Dan #26 (So.) DB; Florell, Randy #77 (Jr.) LB; Franklin, Andra #39 (Sr.) FB; Frazier, Russell (So.) QB; Gary, Russell #9 (Sr.) DB; Gdowski, Tom #93 (So.) DT; Gemar, Scott #1 (Sr.) P Glathar, Kurt #69 (So.) OG; Haase, David (So.) QB; Hagerman, Mark (So.) PK; Hansman, Bob (So.) LB; Heath, John (So.) LB	Hendricks, Dennis (Jr.) OG; Herrmann, Doug (So.) DT; Hill, Dan #84 (So.) TE; Hinds, Tom (So.) OG; Hineline, Curt #59 (Jr.) MG; Holbrook, Tim #23 (So.) DB; Holmes, Daryl #94 (Sr.) DE; Holmon, Craig (So.) FB; Huebert, Randy (Jr.) WB; Hurley, Dan #73 (Jr.) OT; Iodence, Brian #14 (Jr.) DB; Jeffries, Jim (Fr.) DB; Johnson, Brad #55 (So.) C Johnson, Craig #30 (Sr.) IB; Keeler, Mike #61 (So.) DT; Kirk, Donnie (Jr.) PK; Knoll, Eric (So.) QB; Kotera, Jim #44 (Sr.) FB; Krejci, Jeff #2 (Jr.) DB; Krenk, Mitch #89 (So.) TE; Kwapick, Jeff #57 (So.) OT; Landwehr, Randy #27 (Jr.) IB; Larsen, Pat #3 (So.) DB; Lewis, Rodney #5 (Jr.) DB; Liegl, David #28 (Sr.) DB; Lindquist, Ric #15 (Jr.) DB; Lindstrom, Dan #98 (Sr.) DE; Lindstrom, Scott (So.) MG; Lingenfelter, Bruce #71 (Jr.) OG; Lonowski, Jack #67 (Jr.) DT; Lyday, Allen (So.) DB; Mandelko, Mike #68 (So.) OG; Mann, Ricky (So.) DB; Mason, Nate #8 (So.) QB; Mathison, Bruce #19 (So.) QB; Mauer, Mark #17 (Jr.) QB; McCrady, Tim #24 (Sr.) WB; McCue, Dave #32 (So.) WB; McElroy, Mike (So.) C McWhirter, Steve #45 (So.) LB; Means, Andy #34 (Sr.) DB; Merrell, Jeff #74 (So.) MG; Miles, Darwin #91 (So.) DE; Moravec, Mark #42 (So.) FB; Mortensen, Kurt (So.) DB; Muehling, Brad (So.) C Murphy, Jim (So.) DB; Neil, Eddie (So.) PK; Nelson, Derrie #92 (Sr.) DE; Noonan, John #95 (Sr.) SE	O'Hearn, Allan (So.) PK; Owen, Keith (So.) DB; Patterson, Bill (So.) IB; Peterson, Dick #83 (Jr.) TE; Praeuner, Wade (So.) DE; Quinn, Jeff #11 (Sr.) QB; Raridon, Scott (So.) OT; Redwine, Jarvis #12 (Sr.) IB; Ridder, Dave (So.) DT; Rimington, Dave #50 (So.) C Rogan, Dennis (So.) IB; Rush, Kym (So.) DT; Santin, John (So.) LB; Schleusener, Randy #53 (Sr.) OG; Schmuecker, Dan (So.) OT; Schoening, Lynn (So.) PK; Sculley, Mike (Jr.) MG; Searcey, L.G. #37 (Jr.) DB; Seibel, Kevin #49 (So.) P/PK; Sherlock, John (So.) OG; Sherry, Scott (Jr.) DE; Simmons, Ricky #7 (So.) WB; Sims, Sammy #6 (Jr.) DB; Smith, Paul (So.) FB; Sorenson, John (So.) SE; Spratte, Todd #81 (So.) DE; Steels, Anthony #33 (Jr.) WB; Steinkuhler, Dean (So.) OG; Stephens, Greg (So.) TE; Stromath, Dave #99 (Jr.) DT; Theiss, Randy #65 (So.) OT; Tramner, Mike (So.) MG; Trent, Phil #16 (So.) DB; Van Lent, Bill #90 (So.) DT; Van Norman, Kris #38 (So.) DB; Vergith, Tom (So.) WB; Waechter, Henry #75 (Jr.) DT; Walton, Jerry (So.) DB; Wees, Dennis #62 (So.) MG; Wehrle, Craig (So.) TE; White, Felix (So.) MG; Wilkening, Doug (So.) FB; Williams, Brent #66 (Sr.) LB; Williams, Jamie #80 (So.) TE; Williams, Jimmy #96 (Jr.) DE; Williams, Toby #97 (So.) DT; Woodard, Scott #88 (Sr.) SE; Zutavern, John (Jr.) LB

=== Depth chart ===
Defense

FS
Russell Gary
Jeff Krejci
Ricky Mann

INSDIE	INSDIE
Brent Williams	Kim Baker; Steve Damkroger
Steve McWhirter	Bret Evans
John Santin	Randy Florell

MONSTER BACK
Sammy Sims
Kris Van-Norman
L.G. Searcey

CB
Andy Means
David Liegl
Brian Iodence

DE	DT	NT	DT	DE
Derrie Nelson	Henry Waechter	Curt Hineline	David Clark	Jimmy Williams
Dan Lindstrom	Dave Stromath	Jeff Merrell	Toby Williams	Daryl Holmes
Tony Felici	Bill Van-Lent	Dennis Wees	Tom Gdowski	Donnie Bess

CB
Ric Lindquist
Rodney Lewis
Pat Larsen

Offense

SE
Todd Brown
John Noonan
Scott Woodard

LT	LG	C	RG	RT
Randy Theiss	Joe Adams	Dave Rimington	Randy Schleusener	Dan Hurley
Mike Bruce	Mike Mandelko	Brad Johnson	Gary England	Tom Carlstrom
Jeff Kwapick	Scott Raridon	Trey DeLoach	Matt Brandl	Peter Boll

TE
Jeff Finn
Steve Davies
Jamie Williams

WB
Anthony Steels
Tim McCrady
Ricky Simmons

QB
Jeff Quinn
Mark Mauer
Nate Mason

FB
Andra Franklin
Jim Kotera
Phil Bates

Special teams
PK Kevin Seibel
P Scott Gemar

RB
Jarvis Redwine
Roger Craig
Craig Johnson

== Coaching staff ==
Name	Title	First year in this position	Years at Nebraska	Alma mater
Tom Osborne	Head Coach; Offensive Coordinator	1973	1964–1997	Hastings College
Lance Van Zandt	Defensive Coordinator; Defensive backs	1977	1977–1980	Lamar
Charlie McBride	Defensive Line	1977	1977–1999	Colorado
Cletus Fischer	Offensive Line		1960–1985	Nebraska
John Melton	Linebackers	1973	1962–1988	Wyoming
Mike Corgan	Running Backs	1962	1962–1982	Notre Dame
Boyd Epley	Head Strength Coach	1969	1969–2003	Nebraska
George Darlington	Defensive Ends		1973–2002	Rutgers
Milt Tenopir	Offensive Line	1974	1974–2002	Sterling
Gene Huey	Receivers	1977	1977–1986	Wyoming
Frank Solich	Head Freshman Coach	1979	1979–2003	Nebraska
Jack Pierce			1979–1991	
Jerry Pettibone	Recruiting Coordinator	1980	1980–1981	Oregon State

== Game summaries ==
=== Utah ===
Utah at #8 Nebraska [box score]

Team	1	2	3	4	Total
Utah	3	0	0	6	9
• #8 Nebraska	14	7	20	14	55

- Date: 1980-09-13
- Location: Memorial Stadium, Lincoln, Nebraska
- Game attendance: 75,526

Nebraska racked up 545 yards on the ground, the second-highest total in school history, as IB Jarvis Redwine averaged over 10 yards per carry before leaving the game in the hands of capable reserves. Utah suffered from two interceptions, and the sole Utes touchdown didn't get punched in until Cornhusker backups were on the field in the 4th quarter for playing time.

=== Iowa ===
Iowa at #6 Nebraska [box score]

Team	1	2	3	4	Total
Iowa	0	0	0	0	0
• #6 Nebraska	14	21	7	15	57

- Date: 1980-09-20
- Location: Memorial Stadium, Lincoln, Nebraska
- Game attendance: 76,029

Nebraska completely shut down Iowa's heralded runner Jeff Brown, putting to rest Iowa's hope for a rushing contest with Nebraska IB Jarvis Redwine. Redwine left the game shortly after halftime after collecting 153 yards on 12 attempts, while Brown added only 51 to his career total during the entire game. Other Iowa rushing attempts went the other way, and the Hawkeye ground total netted only 44 yards as the Cornhuskers allowed Iowa into Nebraska territory only twice in the entire game on their way to delivering a painful 57–0 shutout.

=== Penn State ===
#3 Nebraska at #11 Penn State [box score]

Team	1	2	3	4	Total
• #3 Nebraska	7	7	7	0	21
#11 Penn State	0	7	0	0	7

- Date: 1980-09-27
- Location: Beaver Stadium, University Park, Pennsylvania
- Game attendance: 84,585

The Blackshirts were the stars of this day in front of a record crowd at State College, as the Nebraska defense sacked Penn State QB Jeff Hostetler eight times for 89 yards, and forced seven turnovers, keeping the Nittany Lions constantly on their heels and away from any hope of an upset. Penn State managed just one touchdown, in the 2nd quarter, and accumulated a net rushing total of only 33 yards.

=== Florida State ===
#16 Florida State at #3 Nebraska [box score]

Team	1	2	3	4	Total
• #16 Florida State	0	3	12	3	18
#3 Nebraska	7	7	0	0	14

- Date: 1980-10-04
- Location: Memorial Stadium, Lincoln, Nebraska
- Game attendance: 76,152

Trailing by 4 points as the clock wound down under 15 seconds, Nebraska QB Jeff Quinn was hit only three yards from the end zone, forcing a fumble which was recovered by Florida State. The Seminoles escaped Lincoln with a win, and the Cornhuskers lost IB Jarvis Redwine for two weeks due to broken ribs, along with their hopes for an undefeated season. Husker fans, impressed by FSU's tenacity, gave a spontaneous standing ovation to the visiting team, starting a new tradition at Memorial Stadium.

=== Kansas ===
#10 Nebraska at Kansas [box score]

Team	1	2	3	4	Total
• #10 Nebraska	7	26	14	7	54
Kansas	0	0	0	0	0

- Date: 1980-10-11
- Location: Memorial Stadium, Lawrence, Kansas
- Game attendance: 50,268

The temporary loss of IB Jarvis Redwine to injury presented no difficulties to the Big Red Machine, as Nebraska steamrolled Kansas in Lawrence, chalking up 33 points in the 1st half alone. By the end of the game, the Blackshirts had posted another shutout to their stats while the Cornhusker offense rolled up 520 yards of offense and 54 points.

=== Oklahoma State ===
Oklahoma State at #10 Nebraska [box score]

Team	1	2	3	4	Total
Oklahoma State	0	0	7	0	7
• #10 Nebraska	14	7	14	13	48

- Date: 1980-10-18
- Location: Memorial Stadium, Lincoln, Nebraska
- Game attendance: 76,021

The Nebraska defense saw their string of touchdown-prevention quarters ended at 8 when Oklahoma State managed to squeak in a touchdown in the 3rd quarter, but that was all that would be heard from the Cowboys on this day since they were held to −13 ground yards compared to the 430 ground yards posted by the Cornhuskers.

=== Colorado ===
#9 Nebraska at Colorado [box score]

Team	1	2	3	4	Total
• #9 Nebraska	7	24	7	7	45
Colorado	0	0	0	7	7

- Date: 1980-10-25
- Location: Folsom Field, Boulder, Colorado
- Game attendance: 51,489

The return of Nebraska IB Jarvis Redwine was short-lived, as both he and 2nd string IB Craig Johnson left the game with injuries in the 1st quarter. 3rd string IB Roger Craig was still too much for Colorado as Nebraska swept up the Buffaloes in Boulder while collecting 403 ground yards and a decisive 45–7 win, the 13th Cornhusker win in a row over Colorado, whose only score came in the 4th quarter against Nebraska reserves.

=== Missouri ===
#15 Missouri at #8 Nebraska [box score]

Team	1	2	3	4	Total
#15 Missouri	3	10	0	3	16
• #8 Nebraska	14	14	0	10	38

- Date: 1980-11-01
- Location: Memorial Stadium, Lincoln, Nebraska
- Game attendance: 76,155

Nebraska created a 15-point lead by halftime and never looked back, though Missouri was not to be trifled with. Where the Cornhuskers made their gains on the ground, the Tigers achieved their yards in the air, but at the end of the game it was still the Cornhuskers well ahead and celebrating their first win over Missouri in Memorial Stadium since 1972.

=== Kansas State ===
Kansas State at #5 Nebraska [box score]

Team	1	2	3	4	Total
Kansas State	0	0	0	8	8
• #5 Nebraska	10	24	14	7	55

- Date: 1980-11-08
- Location: Memorial Stadium, Lincoln, Nebraska
- Game attendance: 76,121

Kansas State was demolished in Lincoln in every way, as Nebraska racked up 495 yards on the ground and pushed both the 1st and 2nd string Wildcat quarterbacks backwards for a combined −67 yard net on the day. The normally ground-oriented Cornhuskers also dominated in the air, nearly doubling the Wildcat passing yard total and bringing the Nebraska yardage total to 695. Kansas State scored a single touchdown and capped it with a two-point conversion with just 1:52 left on the clock in garbage time, narrowly avoiding the shutout.

=== Iowa State ===
#4 Nebraska at Iowa State [box score]

Team	1	2	3	4	Total
• #4 Nebraska	7	7	14	7	35
Iowa State	0	0	0	0	0

- Date: 1980-11-15
- Location: Cyclone Stadium, Ames, Iowa
- Game attendance: 52,942

Compared with the week prior, Nebraska had a slow start, leading by only 14 at the half, and that only when a Cornhusker punt was fumbled by the Cyclone returner into the end zone and recovered by the Cornhuskers to add 7 to the total with 2:28 left in the half. Nonetheless, the Nebraska offense simply kept powering along, wearing down the Iowa State squad until they surrendered another 21 points, while the Blackshirts held the Cyclone offense to just 130 total yards and no points.

=== Oklahoma ===
#9 Oklahoma at #4 Nebraska [box score]

Team	1	2	3	4	Total
• #9 Oklahoma	0	14	0	7	21
#4 Nebraska	10	0	0	7	17

- Date: 1980-11-22
- Location: Memorial Stadium, Lincoln, Nebraska
- Game attendance: 76,322

The Cornhuskers had a promising start, as IB Jarvis Redwine tore the Sooner defense for an 89-yard touchdown run on Nebraska's first possession and PK Kevin Seibel put a 47 yarder through the uprights to go up by 10, but Oklahoma came to life to lead 14–10 by halftime. Nebraska held the Oklahoma wishbone attack to just 7 yards in the 3rd quarter, but also gave up a couple of turnovers which proved costly as both teams put up only another touchdown each before the game was over with Oklahoma still up by 4 to claim the Big 8 title.

=== Mississippi State ===
#8 Nebraska vs #17 Mississippi State [box score]

Team	1	2	3	4	Total
• #8 Nebraska	7	10	7	7	31
#17 Mississippi State	0	0	3	14	17

- Date: 1980-12-27
- Location: Sun Bowl, El Paso, Texas
- Game attendance: 34,723

Nebraska marked their 12th consecutive bowl game appearance by striking first with 7 points only 2:30 into the first quarter. It was not a major record-setting day, but consistent production and solid ball control provided the Cornhuskers with ample opportunities to produce points. The Bulldogs found themselves behind 17–0 at the half and never had an opportunity to make any serious threat to the Cornhuskers again.

== Rankings ==
Ranking movements Legend: ██ Increase in ranking ██ Decrease in ranking
	Week															
Poll	Pre	1	2	3	4	5	6	7	8	9	10	11	12	13	14	Final
AP	7	8	6	3	3	10	10	9	8	5	4	4	10	9	8	7
Coaches																7

== Awards ==
Award	Name(s)
All-America 1st team	Derrie Nelson, Jarvis Redwine, Randy Schleusner
All-America honorable mention	David Clark, Russell Gary, Curt Hineline
Big 8 Coach of the Year	Tom Osborne
Big 8 Defensive Player of the Year	Derrie Nelson
Big 8 Defensive Newcomer of the Year	Toby Williams
All-Big 8 1st team	David Clark, Andra Franklin, Russell Gary, Derrie Nelson, Jarvis Redwine, Dave Rimington, Randy Schleusner
All-Big 8 2nd team	Joe Adams, Curt Hineline, Dan Hurley, Jeff Quinn, Jimmy Williams (linebacker)
All-Big 8 honorable mention	Todd Brown, Roger Craig, Steve Damkroger, Jeff Finn, Craig Johnson, Andy Means, Randy Theiss, Brent Williams, Toby Williams

== NFL and pro players ==
The following Nebraska players who participated in the 1980 season later moved on to the next level and joined a professional or semi-pro team as draftees or free agents.

Name	Team
Joe Adams	St. Louis Cardinals
Todd Brown	Montreal Concordes
Roger Craig	San Francisco 49ers
Andra Franklin	Miami Dolphins
Russell Gary	New Orleans Saints
Dan Hurley	Boston Breakers
Brad Johnson	Boston Breakers
Mitch Krenk	Chicago Bears
Rodney Lewis	New Orleans Saints
Allen Lyday	Houston Oilers
Bruce Mathison	San Diego Chargers
Jeff Merrell	Boston Breakers
Derrie Nelson	San Diego Chargers
Jeff Quinn	Pittsburgh Steelers
Jarvis Redwine	Minnesota Vikings
Dave Rimington	Cincinnati Bengals
Kevin Seibel	Chicago Blitz
Ricky Simmons	Washington Federals
Anthony Steels	Boston Breakers
Dean Steinkuhler	Houston Oilers
Henry Waechter	Chicago Bears
Jamie Williams	St. Louis Cardinals
Jimmy Williams	Detroit Lions
Toby Williams	New England Patriots
