= 1980 Ohio Bobcats football team =

American college football season

1980 Ohio Bobcats football
- Conference: Mid-American Conference
- Record: 6–5 (5–4 MAC)
- Head coach: Brian Burke (2nd season)
- Home stadium: Peden Stadium

1980 Mid-American Conference football standings
| | Conf. | | | | | Overall |
| Team | W | | L | | T | W | | L | | T |
|---|---|---|---|---|---|---|---|---|---|---|
| Central Michigan $ | 7 | – | 2 | – | 0 | 9 | – | 2 | – | 0 |
| Western Michigan | 6 | – | 3 | – | 0 | 7 | – | 4 | – | 0 |
| Northern Illinois | 4 | – | 3 | – | 0 | 7 | – | 4 | – | 0 |
| Miami (OH) | 4 | – | 3 | – | 0 | 5 | – | 6 | – | 0 |
| Ball State | 5 | – | 4 | – | 0 | 6 | – | 5 | – | 0 |
| Ohio | 5 | – | 4 | – | 0 | 6 | – | 5 | – | 0 |
| Bowling Green | 4 | – | 4 | – | 0 | 4 | – | 7 | – | 0 |
| Toledo | 3 | – | 6 | – | 0 | 4 | – | 7 | – | 0 |
| Kent State | 3 | – | 6 | – | 0 | 3 | – | 8 | – | 0 |
| Eastern Michigan | 1 | – | 7 | – | 0 | 1 | – | 9 | – | 0 |
$ – Conference champion

The 1980 Ohio Bobcats football team was an American football team that represented Ohio University in the Mid-American Conference (MAC) during the 1980 NCAA Division I-A football season. In their second season under head coach Brian Burke, the Bobcats compiled a 6–5 record (5–4 against MAC opponents), finished in a tie for fifth place in the MAC, and outscored all opponents by a combined total of 222 to 196. They played their home games in Peden Stadium in Athens, Ohio.

== Schedule ==
| Date | Opponent | Site | Result | Attendance | Source |
|---|---|---|---|---|---|
| September 13 | at Minnesota* | Memorial Stadium; Minneapolis, MN | L 14–38 | 35,114 | |
| September 20 | Eastern Michigan | Peden Stadium; Athens, OH | W 34–6 | | |
| September 27 | Northern Illinois | Peden Stadium; Athens, OH | L 21–22 | | |
| October 4 | at Kent State | Dix Stadium; Kent, OH | L 14–15 | | |
| October 11 | Central Michigan | Peden Stadium; Athens, OH | W 24–9 | | |
| October 18 | Miami (OH) | Peden Stadium; Athens, OH (rivalry) | W 17–7 | | |
| October 25 | Toledo | Peden Stadium; Athens, OH | W 24–9 | | |
| November 1 | at Western Michigan | Waldo Stadium; Kalamazoo, MI | L 7–13 | | |
| November 8 | Marshall* | Peden Stadium; Athens, OH (rivalry) | W 28–20 | | |
| November 15 | at Ball State | Ball State Stadium; Muncie, IN | L 18–37 | | |
| November 22 | at Bowling Green | Doyt Perry Stadium; Bowling Green, OH | W 21–20 | | |
*Non-conference game
