= 1980 Bowling Green Falcons football team =

American college football season

1980 Bowling Green Falcons football
- Conference: Mid-American Conference
- Record: 4–7 (4–4 MAC)
- Head coach: Denny Stolz (4th season)
- Offensive coordinator: Mike Rasmussen (4th season)
- Home stadium: Doyt Perry Stadium

1980 Mid-American Conference football standings
	Conf.					Overall
Team	W		L		T	W		L		T
Central Michigan $	7	–	2	–	0	9	–	2	–	0
Western Michigan	6	–	3	–	0	7	–	4	–	0
Northern Illinois	4	–	3	–	0	7	–	4	–	0
Miami (OH)	4	–	3	–	0	5	–	6	–	0
Ball State	5	–	4	–	0	6	–	5	–	0
Ohio	5	–	4	–	0	6	–	5	–	0
Bowling Green	4	–	4	–	0	4	–	7	–	0
Toledo	3	–	6	–	0	4	–	7	–	0
Kent State	3	–	6	–	0	3	–	8	–	0
Eastern Michigan	1	–	7	–	0	1	–	9	–	0
$ – Conference champion

The 1980 Bowling Green Falcons football team was an American football team that represented Bowling Green University in the Mid-American Conference (MAC) during the 1980 NCAA Division I-A football season. In their fourth season under head coach Denny Stolz, the Falcons compiled a 4–7 record (4–4 against MAC opponents), finished in seventh place in the MAC, and outscored their opponents by a combined total of 189 to 186.

The team's statistical leaders included Greg Taylor with 562 passing yards, Bryant Jones with 806 rushing yards, and Dan Shetler with 310 receiving yards.

== Schedule ==
Date	Opponent	Site	Result	Attendance	Source
September 6	at Richmond*	City Stadium; Richmond, VA	L 17–20	10,200	
September 13	Eastern Michigan	Doyt Perry Stadium; Bowling Green, OH	L 16–18		
September 20	Long Beach State*	Doyt Perry Stadium; Bowling Green, OH	L 21–23	14,407	
September 27	at Kentucky*	Commonwealth Stadium; Lexington, KY	L 20–21	55,800	
October 4	at Western Michigan	Waldo Stadium; Kalamazoo, MI	W 17–14		
October 11	at Toledo	Glass Bowl; Toledo, OH (rivalry)	W 17–6		
October 18	Kent State	Doyt Perry Stadium; Bowling Green, OH (rivalry)	W 24–3		
October 25	at Miami (OH)	Miami Field; Oxford, OH	L 3–7		
November 1	Ball State	Doyt Perry Stadium; Bowling Green, OH	W 24–21		
November 8	at Central Michigan	Perry Shorts Stadium; Mount Pleasant, MI	L 10–32		
November 22	Ohio	Doyt Perry Stadium; Bowling Green, OH	L 20–21		
*Non-conference game
