= 1980 West Texas State Buffaloes football team =

American college football season

1980 West Texas State Buffaloes football
- Conference: Missouri Valley Conference
- Record: 5–6 (2–4 MVC)
- Head coach: Bill Yung (4th season)
- Home stadium: Kimbrough Memorial Stadium

1980 Missouri Valley Conference football standings
	Conf.					Overall
Team	W		L		T	W		L		T
Tulsa $	4	–	1	–	0	8	–	3	–	0
Wichita State	4	–	1	–	1	5	–	5	–	1
Indiana State	4	–	2	–	0	6	–	5	–	0
Drake	3	–	2	–	0	8	–	3	–	0
West Texas State	2	–	4	–	0	5	–	6	–	0
New Mexico State	1	–	4	–	1	3	–	7	–	1
Southern Illinois	1	–	5	–	0	3	–	8	–	0
$ – Conference champion

The 1980 West Texas State Buffaloes football team was an American football team that represented West Texas State University—now known as West Texas A&M University—as a member of the Missouri Valley Conference (MVC) during the 1980 NCAA Division I-A football season. In their fourth year under head coach Bill Yung, the Buffaloes compiled an overall record of 5–6 record with a mark of 2–4 in conference play, placing fifth in the MVC.

== Schedule ==
Date	Opponent	Site	Result	Attendance	Source
September 6	McNeese State*	Kimbrough Memorial Stadium; Canyon, TX	L 17–20	16,101	
September 13	at Oklahoma State*	Lewis Field; Stillwater, OK	W 20–19	48,400	
September 20	at Baylor*	Baylor Stadium; Waco, TX	L 15–43	25,000	
September 27	No. 5 (D-II) Southwest Texas State*	Kimbrough Memorial Stadium; Canyon, TX	W 21–13	10,500	
October 4	New Mexico State^{†}	Kimbrough Memorial Stadium; Canyon, TX	W 17–15	13,009	
October 11	at UT Arlington*	Maverick Stadium; Arlington, TX	W 38–26	6,749	
October 18	at Drake	Drake Stadium; Des Moines, IA	L 21–27	9,620	
October 25	at Tulsa	Skelly Stadium; Tulsa, OK	L 24–44	18,011	
November 1	at Indiana State	Memorial Stadium; Terre Haute, IN	L 18–37	8,468	
November 15	Wichita State	Kimbrough Memorial Stadium; Canyon, TX	L 18–20		
November 22	at Southern Illinois	McAndrew Stadium; Carbondale, IL	W 23–20	894	
*Non-conference game; ^{†}Homecoming; Rankings from AP Poll released prior to the game
