= 1980 Kansas State Wildcats football team =

American college football season

1980 Kansas State Wildcats football
- Conference: Big Eight Conference
- Record: 4–7 (1–6 Big 8)
- Head coach: Jim Dickey (3rd season)
- Defensive coordinator: Gary Darnell (3rd season)
- Home stadium: KSU Stadium

1980 Big Eight Conference football standings
	Conf.					Overall
Team	W		L		T	W		L		T
No. 3 Oklahoma $	7	–	0	–	0	10	–	2	–	0
No. 7 Nebraska	6	–	1	–	0	10	–	2	–	0
Missouri	5	–	2	–	0	8	–	4	–	0
Iowa State	3	–	4	–	0	7	–	4	–	0
Oklahoma State	3	–	4	–	0	4	–	7	–	0
Kansas State	2	–	5	–	0	4	–	7	–	0
Kansas	1	–	6	–	0	2	–	8	–	1
Colorado	1	–	6	–	0	1	–	10	–	0
$ – Conference champion; Rankings from AP Poll

The 1980 Kansas State Wildcats football team represented Kansas State University in the 1980 NCAA Division I-A football season. The team's head football coach was Jim Dickey. The Wildcats played their home games in KSU Stadium.

1980 was the second time in school history that the Wildcats were shut out three times in one season, the only other time being in 1975. The Wildcats were shut out by LSU, Tulsa, Oklahoma State.

== Schedule ==
Date	Opponent	Site	TV	Result	Attendance	Source
September 13	at LSU*	Tiger Stadium; Baton Rouge, LA		L 0–21	75,405	
September 20	South Dakota*	KSU Stadium; Manhattan, KS		W 24–3	26,120	
September 27	Arkansas State*	KSU Stadium; Manhattan, KS		W 31–7	32,580	
October 4	at Tulsa*	Skelly Field; Tulsa, OK		L 0–3	23,213	
October 11	at Iowa State	Cyclone Stadium; Ames, IA (rivalry)		L 7–31	50,163	
October 18	at No. 17 Oklahoma	Oklahoma Memorial Stadium; Norman, OK		L 21–35	74,638	
October 25	No. 16 Missouri^{†}	KSU Stadium; Manhattan, KS	ABC	L 3–13	30,610	
November 1	Kansas	KSU Stadium; Manhattan, KS (rivalry)		W 18–20 (forfeit)^	43,276	
November 8	at No. 5 Nebraska	Memorial Stadium; Lincoln, NE (rivalry)		L 8–55	76,121	
November 15	Oklahoma State	KSU Stadium; Manhattan, KS		L 0–10	22,370	
November 22	Colorado	KSU Stadium; Manhattan, KS (rivalry)		W 17–14	17,510	
*Non-conference game; ^{†}Homecoming; Rankings from AP Poll released prior to the game

^ Kansas State counts this as a win even though they lost the game to Kansas 20-18. Kansas was forced by the Big Eight Conference to forfeit this game after beating Kansas State on the field. Kerwin Bell, a Kansas running back was later determined to be ineligible at the time of the game. However, this was not an NCAA sanction and the Big Eight conference no longer exists legally, so Kansas claims the victory and the NCAA considers KU to be the winner of the 1980 game as well.

== Roster ==
1980 Kansas State Wildcats football team roster
Players
Coaches
Offense

Pos.	#	Name	Class
TE	80	Mike Cox	So
QB	4	Darrell Ray Dickey	So
QB	12	Stan Weber	Fr
OT	77	Doug Hoppock	Jr
RB	20	Kenny Smith	Jr
C	51	Pat Sura	Sr

Defense

Pos.	#	Name	Class
DE	60	Monte Bennett	Sr
DT	76	Stevan Clark	Sr
LB	93	Mitch Foote	Sr
LB	99	Mike Orr	So
CB	41	Steve Schuster	Sr
LB	57	Jack Williamson	Jr

Special teams

Pos.	#	Name	Class
K	7	Jim Jackson	Jr

Head coach

- Jim Dickey

Coordinators/assistant coaches

- Gary Darnell – Defensive Coordinator & assistant head coach
- Carl Selmer – Offensive line
- Mo Lattimore – Defensive ends
- Chuck Driesbach – Defensive backs
- Jim Davie – Assistant
- Jim Donnan – Assistant
- Dennis Franchione – Assistant
- George Walstad – Assistant

Legend

- (C) Team captain
- (S) Suspended
- (I) Ineligible
- Injured
- Redshirt
