= 1980 Iowa State Cyclones football team =

American college football season

1980 Iowa State Cyclones football
- Conference: Big Eight Conference
- Record: 6–5 (3–4 Big 8)
- Head coach: Donnie Duncan (2nd season)
- Offensive coordinator: Mack Brown (1st season)
- Home stadium: Cylcone Stadium

1980 Big Eight Conference football standings
	Conf.					Overall
Team	W		L		T	W		L		T
No. 3 Oklahoma $	7	–	0	–	0	10	–	2	–	0
No. 7 Nebraska	6	–	1	–	0	10	–	2	–	0
Missouri	5	–	2	–	0	8	–	4	–	0
Iowa State	3	–	4	–	0	7	–	4	–	0
Oklahoma State	3	–	4	–	0	4	–	7	–	0
Kansas State	2	–	5	–	0	4	–	7	–	0
Kansas	1	–	6	–	0	2	–	8	–	1
Colorado	1	–	6	–	0	1	–	10	–	0
$ – Conference champion; Rankings from AP Poll

The 1980 Iowa State Cyclones football team represented Iowa State University as a member of the Big Eight Conference during the 1980 NCAA Division I-A football season. Led by second-year head coach Donnie Duncan, the Cyclones compiled an overall record of 6–5 with a mark of 3–4 in conference play, tying for fourth place in the Big 8. Iowa State played home games at Cylcone Stadium in Ames, Iowa.

== Schedule ==
Date	Time	Opponent	Rank	Site	TV	Result	Attendance	Source
September 13	1:30 pm	Northeast Louisiana*		Cylcone Stadium; Ames, IA		W 42–7	47,331	
September 20	1:30 pm	San Jose State*		Cyclone Stadium; Ames, IA		W 27–6	47,806	
September 27	1:05 pm	at Iowa*		Kinnick Stadium; Iowa City, IA (rivalry)	IPBN/ESPN (delay)	W 10–7	60,145	
October 4	1:30 pm	Colorado State*		Cyclone Stadium; Ames, IA		W 69–0	49,368	
October 11	1:30 pm	Kansas State^{†}		Cyclone Stadium; Ames, IA (rivalry)		W 31–7	50,163	
October 18	1:30 pm	at Kansas	No. 19	Memorial Stadium; Lawrence, KS		L 17–28	30,000	
October 25	1:30 pm	No. 17 Oklahoma		Cyclone Stadium; Ames, IA		L 7–42	52,974	
November 1	2:00 pm	at Colorado		Folsom Field; Boulder, CO		L 9–17	41,567	
November 8	1:30 pm	at Missouri		Faurot Field; Columbia, MO (rivalry)		L 10–14	67,533	
November 15	1:30 pm	No. 4 Nebraska		Cyclone Stadium; Ames, IA (rivalry)	ESPN (delay)	L 0–35	52,942	
November 22	1:30 pm	at Oklahoma State		Lewis Field; Stillwater, OK		W 23–21	37,500	
*Non-conference game; ^{†}Homecoming; Rankings from AP Poll released prior to the game; All times are in Central time

== Roster ==
1980 Iowa State Cyclones football team roster
Players
Coaches
Offense

Pos.	#	Name	Class
RB	45	Dwayne Crutchfield	Jr
TE	88	Dan Johnson	Jr
C	56	Jim Meyer	So
OT	69	Karl Nelson	So
QB	18	John Quinn	Jr
TE	81	Mark Weidemann	Sr
QB	11	Scott Williams	Fr

Defense

Pos.	#	Name	Class
SS	20	John Arnaud	So
CB	19	Joe Brown	Jr
CB	44	Larry Crawford	Sr
CB	9	Jeff Grannon	Sr
LB	55	Jim Less	Sr
DT	71	Dan Martin	So
DT	62	Kenny Neil	Sr
DT	74	Scott Nelson	So
SS	16	Ronnie Osborne	So
DE	80	Bruce Reimers	Fr
LB	54	Chris Washington	Fr
LB		Jay Niemann	So

Special teams

Pos.	#	Name	Class
P	10	Kelly Goodburn	Fr
P	3	Rich Miller	Jr

Head coach

- Donnie Duncan

Coordinators/assistant coaches

Legend

- (C) Team captain
- (S) Suspended
- (I) Ineligible
- Injured
- Redshirt

== Team players in the NFL ==
Player	Position	Round	Pick	NFL club
Kenny Neil	Defensive tackle	7	169	New York Jets
