= 1980 Colorado Buffaloes football team =

American college football season

1980 Colorado Buffaloes football
- Conference: Big Eight Conference
- Record: 1–10 (1–6 Big 8)
- Head coach: Chuck Fairbanks (2nd season)
- Offensive coordinator: Gene Hochevar (1st season)
- Offensive scheme: Multiple
- Defensive coordinator: Doug Knotts (2nd season)
- Base defense: 3–4
- MVP: Lance Olander
- Captains: Charles Davis; Steve Doolittle; Brant Thurston
- Home stadium: Folsom Field

1980 Big Eight Conference football standings
	Conf.					Overall
Team	W		L		T	W		L		T
No. 3 Oklahoma $	7	–	0	–	0	10	–	2	–	0
No. 7 Nebraska	6	–	1	–	0	10	–	2	–	0
Missouri	5	–	2	–	0	8	–	4	–	0
Iowa State	3	–	4	–	0	7	–	4	–	0
Oklahoma State	3	–	4	–	0	4	–	7	–	0
Kansas State	2	–	5	–	0	4	–	7	–	0
Kansas	1	–	6	–	0	2	–	8	–	1
Colorado	1	–	6	–	0	1	–	10	–	0
$ – Conference champion; Rankings from AP Poll

The 1980 Colorado Buffaloes football team represented the University of Colorado in the Big Eight Conference during the 1980 NCAA Division I-A football season. Led by second-year head coach Chuck Fairbanks, the Buffaloes finished at 1–10 (1–6 in Big 8, tied for last), their second consecutive losing season, and played home games on campus at Folsom Field in Boulder, Colorado.

Colorado's record in 1980 was the worst in program history, punctuated by an 82–42 home loss to Oklahoma in the conference opener, in which 63 records were set. The sole win was over Iowa State in early November; CU had the same record four years later; the 2012 and 2022 teams each had an additional loss (1–11).

== Schedule ==
Date	Opponent	Site	TV	Result	Attendance	Source
September 13	at UCLA*	Los Angeles Memorial Coliseum; Los Angeles, CA		L 14–56	37,250	
September 20	at LSU*	Tiger Stadium; Baton Rouge, LA		L 20–23	74,999	
September 27	Indiana*	Folsom Field; Boulder, CO		L 7–49	40,219	
October 4	No. 12 Oklahoma	Folsom Field; Boulder, CO	ESPN	L 42–82	50,217	
October 11	Drake*	Folsom Field; Boulder, CO		L 22–41	37,689	
October 18	at No. 16 Missouri	Faurot Field; Columbia, MO		L 7–45	72,333	
October 25	No. 9 Nebraska	Folsom Field; Boulder, CO (rivalry)		L 7–45	51,989	
November 1	Iowa State^{†}	Folsom Field; Boulder, CO		W 17–9	41,567	
November 8	at Oklahoma State	Lewis Field; Stillwater, OK		L 7–42	50,000	
November 15	Kansas	Folsom Field; Boulder, CO		L 3–42	24,187	
November 22	at Kansas State	KSU Stadium; Manhattan, KS (rivalry)		L 14–17	17,510	
*Non-conference game; ^{†}Homecoming; Rankings from AP Poll released prior to the game

== Roster ==
1980 Colorado Buffaloes football team roster
Players
Coaches
Offense

Pos.	#	Name	Class
SE	2	Reggie Harden	Jr
QB	12	Scott Kingdom	Jr
QB	16	Randy Essington	Fr
QB, RB	19	Charles Davis (C)	Jr
WB	28	Lyndell Hawkins	Sr
HB, P	29	Lance Olander	Sr
FB	42	Willie Beebe	Jr
C	51	Rich Umphrey	Jr
OT	61	Art Dale Johnson	Sr
C	63	Vince Rafferty	Fr
G	64	Bo Halamandaris	Sr
G	65	Joe Bell	Sr
G	66	Doug Krahenbuhl	Jr
OT	72	Brant Thurston (C)	Sr
OT	74	Bob Sebro	Jr
OT	75	Roger Gunter	Jr
OT	76	Bruce Campbell	Sr
SE	80	Ricky Ward	Jr
TE	84	Bob Niziolek	Sr

Defense

Pos.	#	Name	Class
S	17	Larry Lillo	Jr
CB	20	Ricky Bynum	Jr
CB	22	Victor Scott	Fr
S	31	Jeff Donaldson	Fr
ILB	38	Steve Doolittle (C)	Sr
ILB	40	Bob Humble	So
S	41	Brad Chace	So
S	46	Ellis Wood	So
OLB	53	Kevin Hood	So
OLB	55	Scott Hardison	Fr
OLB	56	Rod Butler	So
DE	90	Pete Perry	Jr
DE	96	Graham Harrison	Jr
NT		Dan Ralph
CB		Tim Stampley

Special teams

Pos.	#	Name	Class
PK	3	Tom Field	So

Head coach

- Chuck Fairbanks (2nd year)

Coordinators/assistant coaches

- Ray Braun (DL)
- Gary Cabe (WR)
- Gene Hochevar (OC/QB)
- Ron Hubbard (AdmA/OL)
- Lannie Julias (DL)
- Doug Knotts (DC/LB)
- Pete Levine (RB)
- Ron Marciniak (OL)
- Dick Moseley (DB)
- John Sanders (TE)
- Jim Webster (LB)

Legend

- (C) Team captain
- (S) Suspended
- (I) Ineligible
- Injured
- Redshirt

Roster
