= 1980 Wichita State Shockers football team =

American college football season

1980 Wichita State Shockers football
- Conference: Missouri Valley Conference
- Record: 5–5–1 (4–1–1 MVC)
- Head coach: Willie Jeffries (2nd season)
- Defensive coordinator: Ben Blacknall (2nd season)
- Home stadium: Cessna Stadium

1980 Missouri Valley Conference football standings
	Conf.					Overall
Team	W		L		T	W		L		T
Tulsa $	4	–	1	–	0	8	–	3	–	0
Wichita State	4	–	1	–	1	5	–	5	–	1
Indiana State	4	–	2	–	0	6	–	5	–	0
Drake	3	–	2	–	0	8	–	3	–	0
West Texas State	2	–	4	–	0	5	–	6	–	0
New Mexico State	1	–	4	–	1	3	–	7	–	1
Southern Illinois	1	–	5	–	0	3	–	8	–	0
$ – Conference champion

The 1980 Wichita State Shockers football team was an American football team that represented Wichita State as a member of the Missouri Valley Conference during the 1980 NCAA Division I-A football season. In their second year under head coach Willie Jeffries, the team compiled a 5–5–1 record.

== Schedule ==
Date	Opponent	Site	Result	Attendance	Source
September 6	Southern Illinois	Cessna Stadium; Wichita, KS	W 31–14	19,252	
September 13	at South Carolina*	Williams–Brice Stadium; Columbia, SC	L 0–73	55,761	
September 20	Tulsa	Cessna Stadium; Wichita, KS	W 23–10	19,010	
September 27	at Cincinnati*	Nippert Stadium; Cincinnati, OH	W 13–8		
October 4	Indiana State	Cessna Stadium; Wichita, KS	W 46–20	19,003	
October 11	at No. 15 Arkansas*	War Memorial Stadium; Little Rock, AR	L 7–27	54,268	
October 25	Northern Illinois*^{†}	Cessna Stadium; Wichita, KS	L 14–17	22,511	
November 1	at Drake	Drake Stadium; Des Moines, IA	L 15–38	10,010	
November 8	New Mexico State	Cessna Stadium; Wichita, KS	T 14–14	12,252	
November 15	at West Texas State	Kimbrough Memorial Stadium; Canyon, TX	W 20–18		
November 22	Memphis State*	Liberty Bowl Memorial Stadium; Memphis, TN	L 0–6	10,069	
*Non-conference game; ^{†}Homecoming; Rankings from AP Poll released prior to the game
