= Steve Rhodes (American football) =

American football player (born 1957)

Steve Rhodes (born December 26, 1957) is a former National Football League (NFL) player for the St. Louis Cardinals. He is a former American football wide receiver. In 1981, Rhodes was drafted by the Saint Louis Cardinals out of the University of Oklahoma in the fourth round of the 1981 NFL Draft. He was a graduate of H. Grady Spruce in Dallas, Texas in 1976. Rhodes also was a baseball player for the Sooners.

== See also ==
- 1981 NFL draft
