= Reggie L. Smith =

American football player (born 1962)

Reggie L. Smith (born August 29, 1962 in Chicago, Illinois), is a National Board Member and Chicago Chapter Vice President of the National Football League Players Association, Former Players (NFLPA). Smith played college football at the University of Kansas before two 3rd round draft offers from the Denver Broncos (NFL) and Tampa Bay Bandits (USFL) and chose Tampa Bay in the 1984 NFL Draft.

Currently, Smith is a professional speaker and a business development executive for Primus, Inc. In February 2011, Smith was elected president of the National Football League Players Association, Former Players-Chicago Chapter. He had previously served as the chapter's Vice President.

== Early years ==
Smith was born and raised in Chicago, IL. After his mother died in 1968 when he was six, Smith was raised by his paternal grandparents on the south side of Chicago until his graduation. Smith, the youngest boy of eight children, attended Chicago Vocational High School and played offensive and defensive tackle and ultimately received a full scholarship to the University of Kansas.

== College career ==
Smith was a three-year starter at the University of Kansas, Lawrence, KS, where he was named a Football News Sophomore All-American. He played offensive tackle under coaches Don Fambrough and Mike Gottfried. During his senior year, Smith did not allow a sack.

== NFL/USFL career ==
Smith was drafted by both professional leagues, National Football League and the United States Football League, in the 1984 draft by the Denver Broncos and the Tampa Bay Bandits. Smith elected to start his professional career with the USFL Tampa Bay Bandits. During his 3-year USFL career, he honed his skills alongside future NFL players Nate Newton and Dan Fike, while playing against the likes of Reggie White. Smith realized a childhood dream—playing in the NFL—with stops in Denver, Dallas, and a return to Tampa Bay (after the collapse of the USFL; see NFL v USFL lawsuit). During his NFL career, Smith discovered the professional side of the NFL and was motivated to investigate litigation support as a potential future career.

== Professional and philanthropic career ==
Smith was elected in February 2011 to serve as President of the Chicago Chapter of the NFLPA, Former Players. In this capacity, he acts as the spokesperson and organizer for Former NFL Players in the Chicago area. He has been able to use his position for the betterment of the organization, its members, and the community at-large.

Smith, as leader of his NFLPA chapter, has organized and executed numerous high-profile projects. In association with a local chapter of the National Association of Home Builders, Smith organized a service day to revamp a Chicago area alternative high school. Smith worked to celebrate the importance of fathers and fatherhood in conjunction with the United States Department of Housing and Urban Development.

Recently, the Wall Street Journal featured an article about a new partnership Smith worked to initiate between the Chicago Chapter of the NFLPA, Former Players and RETROFIT, a “Chicago-based company dedicated to data-driven weight loss, to offer members an expert-led wellness program, helping them get in top condition through a holistic diet and exercise approach.”

Smith has served as Chair of the Trustee Board of AMI Infinity Schools, Chicago. He also serves as an advisory board member of the Sports Leadership Institute.

In 2013 Smith as elected Chairman of the Executive Board of the nonprofit youth organization, Dreams for Kids, Inc.
