= Steve Haworth (American football) =

American football player (1961–1998)

No. 30
- Position: Defensive back

Personal information
- Born: September 19, 1961; Manila, Philippines
- Died: December 8, 1998 (aged 37); Durant, Oklahoma, U.S.
- Listed height: 5 ft 11 in (1.80 m)
- Listed weight: 189 lb (86 kg)

Career information
- High school: Durant (OK)
- College: Oklahoma (1979–1982)
- NFL draft: 1983: 6th round, 142nd overall pick

Career history
- Houston Oilers (1983)*; Atlanta Falcons (1983–1984)
- * Offseason or practice squad member only
- Stats at Pro Football Reference

Steve Haworth (September 19, 1961 – December 8, 1998) was a Filipino-born American professional football player. A defensive back, he played college football for the Oklahoma Sooners from 1979 to 1982. After college, he was selected by the Houston Oilers in the sixth round of the 1983 NFL draft, but did not make the team. He joined the Atlanta Falcons midway through the 1983 season and played with them through 1984.

== Early life ==
Haworth was born on September 19, 1961, in Manila, the Philippines. He later moved to the U.S., attending Durant High School in Oklahoma where he played football. A defensive back and split end, he helped Durant to a runner-up finish at the 2A state championships as a senior in 1978. That year, Haworth recorded 59 unassisted tackles, six interceptions and five forced fumbles on defense, along with 11 receptions for 300 yards on offense. He was named all-state for his performance. He was ranked the top defensive back in the state and signed to play college football for the Oklahoma Sooners.

== College career ==
After being a backup as a freshman in 1979, Haworth succeeded Darrol Ray as starting safety for the Sooners in 1980, posting two interceptions and a fumble recovery in the season opener. He helped the 1980 Oklahoma team to a record of 10–2, the Big Eight Conference championship and a victory in the 1981 Orange Bowl. In addition to playing at safety, Haworth also saw time at cornerback. He suffered from injuries in his last two seasons, missing half of the 1981 season due to a groin pull and three games in 1982 from a neck injury. The 1981 Sooners compiled a record of 7–4–1 and won the Sun Bowl, while the 1982 Sooners went 8–4 and lost in the Fiesta Bowl.

== Professional career ==
Despite concerns about his injuries, Haworth was still considered one of Oklahoma's top NFL draft prospects. The Daily Oklahoman noted that scouts had "concerns with his durability ... but nobody questions his effort and enthusiasm". Before the draft, he posted a 4.6-second 40-yard dash. He was selected by the Houston Oilers in the sixth round (142nd overall) of the 1983 NFL draft. Haworth was also selected by the New Jersey Generals in the 1983 USFL territorial draft, but chose to sign with the Oilers. He was released by the Oilers on August 22, prior to the 1983 season. On October 5, 1983, Haworth signed with the Atlanta Falcons as a safety and nickelback. He made his NFL debut in a Week 6 loss to the New Orleans Saints and finished the season having appeared in 11 games as a backup safety and special teams player. Prior to the 1984 season, he pulled his hamstring and was placed on injured reserve. Haworth was activated on October 24 and appeared in five games before being placed on the reserve/non-football injury list on December 1. He became a free agent after the season and was not re-signed, ending his professional career. Haworth appeared in a total of 16 NFL games.

== Later life and death ==
Haworth was involved in several legal issues after his NFL career. He was involved in a burglary in March 1991 and also had charges of forgery and concealing stolen property. While on parole, he committed another burglary in December 1991. After pleading guilty, he was sentenced to 10 years in prison in January 1992. At his sentencing, Haworth told children to "stay away from alcohol and drugs. I know that's corny and clicheish, but that's what you have to do. It's ruined my life." He died on December 8, 1998, at the age of 37. The spokesman for the Oklahoma City chief medical examiner's office said that there was "some indication of drug involvement" in his death.
