= 1980 Indiana State Sycamores football team =

American college football season

1980 Indiana State Sycamores football
- Conference: Missouri Valley Conference
- Record: 6–5 (4–2 MVC)
- Head coach: Dennis Raetz (1st season)
- Offensive coordinator: Pete Hoener (1st season)
- Home stadium: Memorial Stadium

1980 Missouri Valley Conference football standings
	Conf.					Overall
Team	W		L		T	W		L		T
Tulsa $	4	–	1	–	0	8	–	3	–	0
Wichita State	4	–	1	–	1	5	–	5	–	1
Indiana State	4	–	2	–	0	6	–	5	–	0
Drake	3	–	2	–	0	8	–	3	–	0
West Texas State	2	–	4	–	0	5	–	6	–	0
New Mexico State	1	–	4	–	1	3	–	7	–	1
Southern Illinois	1	–	5	–	0	3	–	8	–	0
$ – Conference champion

The 1980 Indiana State Sycamores football team was an American football team that represented Indiana State University in the 1980 NCAA Division I-A football season. They were led by first-year head coach Dennis Raetz and played their home games at Memorial Stadium. They were a member of the Missouri Valley Conference (MVC) and finished the season 6–5, 4–2 in MVC play to finish in third place.

The roster included quarterback Reggie Allen, the 1979 MVC Offensive MVP; safety John Allman; and Craig Shaffer the 1981 MVC Defensive MVP. Shaffer spent three seasons with the St. Louis Cardinals.

Allman was the first Sycamore to be named to consecutive all-conference honors. He again received all-conference in 1981 for a third consecutive season, finishing his career second in career tackles (12th today) and third in career interceptions (fourth today).

Four Sycamores led the MVC in different statistical categories: Kirk Wilson in yards per reception, Joe Stellern in field goals made, Lester Byrd in yardage per kickoff return and John Allman in interception return yardage.

Six Sycamores were named to all-conference teams: Hubert Moore, TE; Eddie Ruffin, WR; Mark Gradkowski, OG; John Gaunt, DT; Craig Shaffer, LB and John Allman, DB

== Schedule ==
Date	Time	Opponent	Site	Result	Attendance	Source
September 6	1:30 pm (CDT)	at Drake	Drake Stadium; Des Moines, IA	W 13–10	9,450	
September 20	7:30 pm (EST)	Eastern Illinois*	Memorial Stadium; Terre Haute, IN	W 14–0	15,368	
September 27	7:30 pm (EST)	Akron*	Memorial Stadium; Terre Haute, IN	W 27–9	10,486	
October 4	1:30 pm (CDT)	at Wichita State	Cessna Stadium; Wichita, KS	L 20–46	19,003	
October 11	1:30 pm (CDT)	Southern Illinois*^{†}	Memorial Stadium; Terre Haute, IN	W 19–6	18,293	
October 18	1:30 pm (EST)	at Louisville*	Fairgrounds Stadium; Louisville, KY	L 17–27	24,695	
October 25	1:30 pm (CST)	Illinois State*	Hancock Stadium; Normal, IL	L 0–9	10,017	
November 1	1:30 pm (EST)	West Texas State	Memorial Stadium; Terre Haute, IN	W 37–18	8,468	
November 8	1:30 pm (CST)	at Tulsa	Skelly Stadium; Tulsa, OK	L 7–30	17,647	
November 15	1:30 pm (EST)	New Mexico State	Memorial Stadium; Terre Haute, IN	W 33–28	5,010	
November 22	1:30 pm (EST)	at Ball State*	Ball State Stadium; Muncie, IN (rivalry)	L 21–28	7,023	
*Non-conference game; ^{†}Homecoming; All times are in Eastern time
