= Jim Rockford (gridiron football) =

American gridiron football player (born 1961)

Profile
- Position: Defensive back

Personal information
- Born: September 5, 1961 (age 65); Bloomington, Illinois, U.S.
- Listed height: 5 ft 10 in (1.78 m)
- Listed weight: 180 lb (82 kg)

Career information
- College: University of Oklahoma
- NFL draft: 1985: 12th round, 316th overall pick

Career history
- 1985: San Diego Chargers
- 1986–90: Hamilton Tiger-Cats
- 1991: Edmonton Eskimos
- 1991–92: Toronto Argonauts

Awards and highlights
- 2× Grey Cup champion (1986, 1991)
- Stats at Pro Football Reference

James Rockford (born September 5, 1961) is a former Grey Cup champion defensive back in the Canadian Football League (CFL) and National Football League (NFL). He was selected by the Tampa Bay Buccaneers in the 12th round of the 1985 NFL draft.

An Oklahoma Sooner, Rockford played one game with the San Diego Chargers before embarking on a career in Canada. He played 5 seasons with the Hamilton Tiger-Cats, winning the Grey Cup in 1986. He also played for the Edmonton Eskimos and Toronto Argonauts, playing 4 regular season and 1 playoff game for the Boatmen.
