= Richard Turner (American football) =

American football player (born 1959)

No. 75
- Position: Nose tackle

Personal information
- Born: February 14, 1959 (age 67); Edmond, Oklahoma, U.S.
- Listed height: 6 ft 2 in (1.88 m)
- Listed weight: 260 lb (118 kg)

Career information
- High school: Edmond Memorial
- College: Oklahoma
- NFL draft: 1981: 4th round, 105th overall pick

Career history
- Green Bay Packers (1981–1983)

Awards and highlights
- First-team All-Big Eight (1980)

Career NFL statistics
- Sacks: 3.5
- Stats at Pro Football Reference

Richard Junior Turner (born February 14, 1959) is an American former professional football player who was a nose tackle for the Green Bay Packers of the National Football League (NFL). He played college football for the Oklahoma Sooners. He was selected by the Packers in the fourth round of the 1981 NFL draft and played three seasons with the team.
