= 1980 Little All-America college football team =

American college football all-star team

The 1980 Little All-America college football team is composed of college football players from small colleges and universities who were selected by the Associated Press (AP) as the best players at each position.

== First team ==
Position	Player	Team
Offense
Quarterback	Neil Lomax	Portland State
Running back	Frank Hawkins	Nevada
Running back	Bobby Hedrick	Elon
Wide receiver	Reggie Eccleston	Connecticut
Wide receiver	Trumaine Johnson	Grambling State
Tight end	Mike Maher	Western Illinois
Tackle	Mike McDonald	Bucknell
Tackle	Todd Thomas	North Dakota
Guard	Don Greco	Western Illinois
Guard	Pete Walters	Western Kentucky
Center	Steve Wigton	Capital
Defense
Defensive end	Pete Catan	Eastern Illinois
Defensive end	Brett Williams	Austin Peay
Defensive tackle	Mike Barker	Grambling State
Defensive tackle	Randy Trautman	Boise State
Middle guard	Steve Scillitani	Clarion
Linebacker	Mike Humiston	Weber State
Linebacker	Bruce Rarig	Lehigh
Linebacker	Larry Werts	Jackson State
Defensive back	William Dillon	Virginia Union
Defensive back	George Floyd	Eastern Kentucky
Defensive back	Bob Manning	Massachusetts

== See also ==
- 1980 College Football All-America Team
