= 1980 Lafayette Leopards football team =

American college football season

1980 Lafayette Leopards football
- Conference: Independent
- Record: 3–7
- Head coach: Neil Putnam (10th season)
- Captains: Steve MacCorkle; Ed Rogulsky
- Home stadium: Fisher Field

1980 NCAA Division I-AA independents football standings
	Conf.			Overall
Team	W	L	T	W		L		T
No. 1 Lehigh ^		–		9	–	1	–	2
No. 6 Delaware		–		9	–	2	–	0
Southeastern Louisiana		–		8	–	2	–	0
No. 8 Northwestern State		–		8	–	3	–	0
Portland State		–		8	–	3	–	0
Bucknell		–		6	–	4	–	0
James Madison		–		4	–	6	–	0
Lafayette		–		3	–	7	–	0
Nicholls State		–		2	–	9	–	0
Northeastern		–		2	–	9	–	0
^ – NCAA Division I-AA playoff participant; Rankings from Associated Press poll

The 1980 Lafayette Leopards football team was an American football team that represented Lafayette College as an independent during the 1980 NCAA Division I-AA football season. In their tenth year under head coach Neil Putnam, the Leopards compiled a 3–7 record. Steve MacCorkle and Ed Rogulsky were the team captains. Lafayette played home games at Fisher Field on College Hill in Easton, Pennsylvania.

== Schedule ==
Date	Opponent	Site	Result	Attendance	Source
September 13	Central Connecticut State	Fisher Field; Easton, PA	L 3–14	3,500	
September 20	Davidson	Fisher Field; Easton, PA	W 27–20	2,500	
September 27	at Columbia	Baker Field; New York, NY	L 0–6	4,500	
October 4	at Maine	Alumni Field; Orono, ME	L 3–24	4,100	
October 11	at Bucknell	Memorial Stadium; Lewisburg, PA	L 0–14		
October 18	Penn	Fisher Field; Easton, PA	W 3–0	12,000	
November 1	at Colgate	Andy Kerr Stadium; Hamilton, NY	L 0–44	3,500	
November 8	at New Hampshire	Cowell Stadium; Durham, NH	L 6–26	7,121	
November 15	Merchant Marine	Fisher Field; Easton, PA	W 31–12		
November 22	No. 1 Lehigh	Fisher Field; Easton, PA (The Rivalry)	L 0–32	17,000	
^ Parents Days; Rankings from Associated Press Poll released prior to the game
