= 1980 Nicholls State Colonels football team =

American college football season

1980 Nicholls State Colonels football
- Conference: Independent
- Record: 2–9
- Head coach: Bill Clements (7th season)
- Home stadium: John L. Guidry Stadium

1980 NCAA Division I-AA independents football standings
	Conf.			Overall
Team	W	L	T	W		L		T
No. 1 Lehigh ^		–		9	–	1	–	2
No. 6 Delaware		–		9	–	2	–	0
Southeastern Louisiana		–		8	–	2	–	0
No. 8 Northwestern State		–		8	–	3	–	0
Portland State		–		8	–	3	–	0
Bucknell		–		6	–	4	–	0
James Madison		–		4	–	6	–	0
Lafayette		–		3	–	7	–	0
Nicholls State		–		2	–	9	–	0
Northeastern		–		2	–	9	–	0
^ – NCAA Division I-AA playoff participant; Rankings from Associated Press poll

The 1980 Nicholls State Colonels football team represented Nicholls State University as an independent during the 1980 NCAA Division I-AA football season. Led by Bill Clements in his seventh and final season as head coach, the Colonels compiled a record of 2–9. Nicholls State played home games at John L. Guidry Stadium in Thibodaux, Louisiana.

== Schedule ==
Date	Opponent	Site	Result	Attendance	Source
September 6	at Illinois State	Hancock Stadium; Normal, IL	L 13–28	8,182	
September 13	Livingston	John L. Guidry Stadium; Thibodaux, LA	W 20–2		
September 20	at McNeese State	Cowboy Stadium; Lake Charles, LA	L 0–21	20,650	
September 27	No. 3 Troy State	John L. Guidry Stadium; Thibodaux, LA	L 15–25	6,400–6,800	
October 4	No. 5 Southwest Texas State	John L. Guidry Stadium; Thibodaux, LA (rivalry)	W 24–21	4,425–5,000	
October 11	at Southern	University Stadium; Baton Rouge, LA	L 0–48		
October 18	at Austin Peay	Municipal Stadium; Clarksville, TN	L 16–35		
October 25	Tennessee State	John L. Guidry Stadium; Thibodaux, LA	L 15–40	10,050	
November 1	Northeast Louisiana	John L. Guidry Stadium; Thibodaux, LA	L 28–29		
November 8	at Northwestern State	Harry Turpin Stadium; Natchitoches, LA (NSU Challenge)	L 14–21	7,000	
November 15	Southeastern Louisiana	John L. Guidry Stadium; Thibodaux, LA (rivalry)	L 20–35		
Rankings from AP Poll released prior to the game
