= 1980 Maine Black Bears football team =

American college football season

1980 Maine Black Bears football
- Conference: Yankee Conference
- Record: 4–7 (1–4 Yankee)
- Head coach: Jack Bicknell (5th season)
- Captains: Andrew Neilson; Peter A. Thiboutot; John Tursky
- Home stadium: Alumni Field

1980 Yankee Conference football standings
| | Conf. | | | | | Overall |
| Team | W | | L | | T | W | | L | | T |
|---|---|---|---|---|---|---|---|---|---|---|
| No. 9 Boston University $ | 5 | – | 0 | – | 0 | 9 | – | 2 | – | 0 |
| No. T–10 UMass | 4 | – | 1 | – | 0 | 7 | – | 3 | – | 0 |
| No. T–10 Connecticut | 3 | – | 2 | – | 0 | 7 | – | 3 | – | 0 |
| New Hampshire | 2 | – | 3 | – | 0 | 6 | – | 4 | – | 0 |
| Maine | 1 | – | 4 | – | 0 | 4 | – | 7 | – | 0 |
| Rhode Island | 0 | – | 5 | – | 0 | 2 | – | 9 | – | 0 |
$ – Conference champion; Rankings from Associated Press poll

The 1980 Maine Black Bears football team was an American football team that represented the University of Maine as a member of the Yankee Conference during the 1980 NCAA Division I-AA football season. In its fifth season under head coach Jack Bicknell, the team compiled a 4–7 record (1–4 against conference opponents) and finished fifth out of six teams in the Yankee Conference. Andrew Neilson, Peter A. Thiboutot, and John Tursky were the team captains.

== Schedule ==
| Date | Opponent | Site | Result | Attendance | Source |
|---|---|---|---|---|---|
| September 6 | at Merchant Marine* | Tomb Field; Kings Point, NY | W 17–8 | 5,000 | |
| September 13 | Lehigh* | Alumni Field; Orono, ME | L 6–37 | 6,000 | |
| September 20 | Rhode Island | Alumni Field; Orono, ME | W 14–11 | 4,200 | |
| September 27 | at No. 7 Boston University* | Nickerson Field; Boston, MA | L 0–17 | | |
| October 4 | Lafayette* | Alumni Field; Orono, ME | W 24–3 | 4,100 | |
| October 11 | at New Hampshire | Cowell Stadium; Durham, NH (rivalry) | L 13–19 | | |
| October 18 | No. T–10 UMass | Alumni Field; Orono, ME | L 14–21 | 2,700 | |
| October 25 | at No. T–5 Connecticut | Memorial Stadium; Storrs, CT | L 13–14 | 5,000 | |
| November 1 | Northeastern* | Alumni Field; Orono, ME | W 35–24 | 2,009 | |
| November 8 | at Princeton* | Palmer Stadium; Princeton, NJ | L 7–24 | 7,210 | |
| November 15 | No. 8 Delaware* | Alumni Field; Orono, ME | L 6–35 | | |
*Non-conference game; Rankings from Associated Press Poll released prior to the game

== Roster ==
1980 Maine Black Bears football team roster
Players
Coaches
Offense

| Pos. | # | Name | Class |
|---|---|---|---|
| QB | 10 | Mike Beauchemin | So |
| FB | 44 | Matt Bennett | So |
| RB | 24 | Lorenzo Bouier | So |
| C | 67 | Steve Keating | Jr |

Defense

| Pos. | # | Name | Class |
|---|---|---|---|
| DE | 38 | Rich Casselbury | Jr |
| DB | 20 | Matt Downey | Jr |
| DB | 27 | Franklin Osojnicki | So |
| LB | 56 | Tom Rasmussen | Jr |
| S | 5 | Ray Thombs | Jr |

Special teams

| Pos. | # | Name | Class |

Head coach

- Jack Bicknell

Coordinators/assistant coaches

Legend

- (C) Team captain
- (S) Suspended
- (I) Ineligible
- Injured
- Redshirt
