= 1980 Rutgers Scarlet Knights football team =

American college football season

1980 Rutgers Scarlet Knights football
- Conference: Independent
- Record: 7–4
- Head coach: Frank R. Burns (8th season)
- Home stadium: Rutgers Stadium; Giants Stadium

1980 NCAA Division I-A independents football records
	Conf.					Overall
Team	W		L		T	W		L		T
No. 2 Pittsburgh		–		–		11	–	1	–	0
Tennessee State		–		–		9	–	1	–	0
No. 5 Florida State		–		–		10	–	2	–	0
No. 8 Penn State		–		–		10	–	2	–	0
No. 9 Notre Dame		–		–		9	–	2	–	1
No. 18 Miami (FL)		–		–		9	–	3	–	0
Southern Miss		–		–		9	–	3	–	0
Navy		–		–		8	–	4	–	0
South Carolina		–		–		8	–	4	–	0
Virginia Tech		–		–		8	–	4	–	0
Boston College		–		–		7	–	4	–	0
Northeast Louisiana		–		–		7	–	4	–	0
Rutgers		–		–		7	–	4	–	0
UNLV		–		–		7	–	4	–	0
Tulane		–		–		7	–	5	–	0
Colgate		–		–		5	–	4	–	1
North Texas State		–		–		6	–	5	–	0
Villanova		–		–		6	–	5	–	0
West Virginia		–		–		6	–	6	–	0
Louisville		–		–		5	–	6	–	0
Richmond		–		–		5	–	6	–	0
Syracuse		–		–		5	–	6	–	0
East Carolina		–		–		4	–	7	–	0
Illinois State		–		–		4	–	7	–	0
Temple		–		–		4	–	7	–	0
Army		–		–		3	–	7	–	1
Holy Cross		–		–		3	–	8	–	0
Cincinnati		–		–		2	–	9	–	0
Memphis State		–		–		2	–	9	–	0
William & Mary		–		–		2	–	9	–	0
Georgia Tech		–		–		1	–	9	–	1
Rankings from AP Poll

The 1980 Rutgers Scarlet Knights football team represented Rutgers University as an independent during the 1980 NCAA Division I-A football season. In their eighth season under head coach Frank R. Burns, the Scarlet Knights compiled a 7–4 record while competing as an independent and outscored their opponents 279 to 156. The team's statistical leaders included Ed McMichael with 1,761 passing yards, Albert Ray with 778 rushing yards, and Tim Odell with 718 receiving yards.

== Schedule ==
Date	Opponent	Site	Result	Attendance	Source
September 13	at Temple	Franklin Field; Philadelphia, PA	W 21–3	19,876	
September 20	Cincinnati	Rutgers Stadium; Piscataway, NJ	W 24–7	17,800	
September 27	Princeton	Rutgers Stadium; Piscataway, NJ (rivalry)	W 44–13	26,219	
October 4	at Cornell	Schoellkopf Field; Ithaca, NY	W 44–3	11,500	
October 11	No. 1 Alabama	Giants Stadium; East Rutherford, NJ	L 13–17	58,107	
October 18	William & Mary	Rutgers Stadium; Piscataway, NJ	L 18–21	16,825	
October 25	at Syracuse	Carrier Dome; Syracuse, NY	L 9–17	39,937	
November 1	at Army	Michie Stadium; West Point, NY	W 37–21	34,441	
November 8	at Virginia	Scott Stadium; Charlottesville, VA	W 19–17	30,011	
November 15	West Virginia	Rutgers Stadium; Piscataway, NJ	L 15–24	16,400	
November 22	Colgate	Rutgers Stadium; Piscataway, NJ	W 35–13	15,400	
Rankings from AP Poll released prior to the game

== Roster ==
1980 Rutgers Scarlet Knights football team roster
Players
Coaches
Offense

Pos.	#	Name	Class
RB	31	Joe Burke	So
WR		David Dorne	Sr
C	61	Mike Flynn	So
WR	84	Jed Karpinski	So
QB	7	Ralph Leek	So
C	59	Frank Naylor	Jr

Defense

Pos.	#	Name	Class
S	18	Deron Cherry	Sr
CB		Bill Hill	Sr
CB	4	Carl Howard	So
DT	62	Bill Pickel	So

Special teams

Pos.	#	Name	Class

Head coach

- Frank R. Burns

Coordinators/assistant coaches

- Greg Gigantino
  (Centers coach)

Legend

- (C) Team captain
- (S) Suspended
- (I) Ineligible
- Injured
- Redshirt
