= 1980 Southeastern Louisiana Lions football team =

American college football season

1980 Southeastern Louisiana Lions football
- Conference: Independent
- Record: 8–2
- Head coach: Oscar Lofton (1st season)
- Home stadium: Strawberry Stadium

1980 NCAA Division I-AA independents football standings
	Conf.			Overall
Team	W	L	T	W		L		T
No. 1 Lehigh ^		–		9	–	1	–	2
No. 6 Delaware		–		9	–	2	–	0
Southeastern Louisiana		–		8	–	2	–	0
No. 8 Northwestern State		–		8	–	3	–	0
Portland State		–		8	–	3	–	0
Bucknell		–		6	–	4	–	0
James Madison		–		4	–	6	–	0
Lafayette		–		3	–	7	–	0
Nicholls State		–		2	–	9	–	0
Northeastern		–		2	–	9	–	0
^ – NCAA Division I-AA playoff participant; Rankings from Associated Press poll

The 1980 Southeastern Louisiana Lions football team was an American football team that represented Southeastern Louisiana University as an independent during the 1980 NCAA Division I-AA football season. Led by first-year head coach Oscar Lofton, the Lions compiled an 8–2 record.

== Schedule ==
Date	Opponent	Site	Result	Attendance	Source
September 13	at Boise State	Bronco Stadium; Boise, ID	W 17–13	21,342	
September 20	East Tennessee State	Strawberry Stadium; Hammond, LA	W 7–3	8,500	
September 27	at Illinois State	Hancock Stadium; Normal, IL	W 28–21	6,622	
October 4	at Jackson State	Mississippi Veterans Memorial Stadium; Jackson, MS	W 17–16	10,592	
October 11	No. 3 (D-II) Troy State	Strawberry Stadium; Hammond, LA	L 10–21	9,300	
October 18	Texas Southern^{†}	Strawberry Stadium; Hammond, LA	W 47–6	2,500	
October 25	at Northeast Louisiana	Malone Stadium; Monroe, LA	W 55–30	17,203	
November 8	Delta State	Strawberry Stadium; Hammond, LA	W 59–13	7,000	
November 15	at Nicholls State	John L. Guidry Stadium; Thibodaux, LA (rivalry)	W 21–20	5,425	
November 22	at No. T–10 Northwestern State	Harry Turpin Stadium; Natchitoches, LA (rivalry)	L 14–16	3,000	
^{†}Homecoming; Rankings from Associated Press Poll released prior to the game
