= 1980 James Madison Dukes football team =

American college football season

1980 James Madison Dukes football
- Conference: Independent
- Record: 4–6
- Head coach: Challace McMillin (9th season)
- Home stadium: Madison Stadium

1980 NCAA Division I-AA independents football standings
	Conf.			Overall
Team	W	L	T	W		L		T
No. 1 Lehigh ^		–		9	–	1	–	2
No. 6 Delaware		–		9	–	2	–	0
Southeastern Louisiana		–		8	–	2	–	0
No. 8 Northwestern State		–		8	–	3	–	0
Portland State		–		8	–	3	–	0
Bucknell		–		6	–	4	–	0
James Madison		–		4	–	6	–	0
Lafayette		–		3	–	7	–	0
Nicholls State		–		2	–	9	–	0
Northeastern		–		2	–	9	–	0
^ – NCAA Division I-AA playoff participant; Rankings from Associated Press poll

The 1980 James Madison Dukes football team was an American football team that represented James Madison University during the 1980 NCAA Division I-AA football season as an independent. In their ninth year under head coach Challace McMillin, the team compiled a 4–6 record.

== Schedule ==
Date	Opponent	Site	Result	Attendance	Source
September 6	Appalachian State	Madison Stadium; Harrisonburg, VA	L 6–34	7,100	
September 13	at Morehead State	Jayne Stadium; Morehead, KY	L 18–21		
September 20	at Austin Peay	Municipal Stadium; Clarksville, TN	L 3–21		
September 27	at Virginia Tech	Lane Stadium; Blacksburg, VA	L 6–38	30,000	
October 4	at Merchant Marine	Kings Point, NY	W 20–6		
October 11	Liberty Baptist	Madison Stadium; Harrisonburg, VA	W 30–14		
October 25	Wofford	Madison Stadium; Harrisonburg, VA	W 3–0		
November 1	at No. 3 Lehigh	Taylor Stadium; Bethlehem, PA	L 14–31		
November 8	East Tennessee State	Madison Stadium; Harrisonburg, VA	L 23–28	11,800	
November 15	Shippensburg	Madison Stadium; Harrisonburg, VA	W 19–14		
Rankings from AP Poll released prior to the game
