= 1980 William & Mary Tribe football team =

American college football season

1980 William & Mary Tribe football
- Conference: Independent
- Record: 2–9
- Head coach: Jimmye Laycock (1st season)
- Offensive coordinator: Ralph Friedgen (1st season)
- Captains: Steve McNamee; Dennis Fitzpatrick
- Home stadium: Cary Field

1980 NCAA Division I-A independents football records
| | Conf. | | | | | Overall |
| Team | W | | L | | T | W | | L | | T |
|---|---|---|---|---|---|---|---|---|---|---|
| No. 2 Pittsburgh | | – | | – | | 11 | – | 1 | – | 0 |
| Tennessee State | | – | | – | | 9 | – | 1 | – | 0 |
| No. 5 Florida State | | – | | – | | 10 | – | 2 | – | 0 |
| No. 8 Penn State | | – | | – | | 10 | – | 2 | – | 0 |
| No. 9 Notre Dame | | – | | – | | 9 | – | 2 | – | 1 |
| No. 18 Miami (FL) | | – | | – | | 9 | – | 3 | – | 0 |
| Southern Miss | | – | | – | | 9 | – | 3 | – | 0 |
| Navy | | – | | – | | 8 | – | 4 | – | 0 |
| South Carolina | | – | | – | | 8 | – | 4 | – | 0 |
| Virginia Tech | | – | | – | | 8 | – | 4 | – | 0 |
| Boston College | | – | | – | | 7 | – | 4 | – | 0 |
| Northeast Louisiana | | – | | – | | 7 | – | 4 | – | 0 |
| Rutgers | | – | | – | | 7 | – | 4 | – | 0 |
| UNLV | | – | | – | | 7 | – | 4 | – | 0 |
| Tulane | | – | | – | | 7 | – | 5 | – | 0 |
| Colgate | | – | | – | | 5 | – | 4 | – | 1 |
| North Texas State | | – | | – | | 6 | – | 5 | – | 0 |
| Villanova | | – | | – | | 6 | – | 5 | – | 0 |
| West Virginia | | – | | – | | 6 | – | 6 | – | 0 |
| Louisville | | – | | – | | 5 | – | 6 | – | 0 |
| Richmond | | – | | – | | 5 | – | 6 | – | 0 |
| Syracuse | | – | | – | | 5 | – | 6 | – | 0 |
| East Carolina | | – | | – | | 4 | – | 7 | – | 0 |
| Illinois State | | – | | – | | 4 | – | 7 | – | 0 |
| Temple | | – | | – | | 4 | – | 7 | – | 0 |
| Army | | – | | – | | 3 | – | 7 | – | 1 |
| Holy Cross | | – | | – | | 3 | – | 8 | – | 0 |
| Cincinnati | | – | | – | | 2 | – | 9 | – | 0 |
| Memphis State | | – | | – | | 2 | – | 9 | – | 0 |
| William & Mary | | – | | – | | 2 | – | 9 | – | 0 |
| Georgia Tech | | – | | – | | 1 | – | 9 | – | 1 |
Rankings from AP Poll

The 1980 William & Mary Tribe football team represented the College of William & Mary as an independent during the 1980 NCAA Division I-A football season. Led by Jimmye Laycock in his first year as head coach, William & Mary finished the season with a record of 2–9.

== Schedule ==
| Date | Opponent | Site | Result | Attendance | Source |
|---|---|---|---|---|---|
| September 6 | at NC State | Carter–Finley Stadium; Raleigh, NC | L 0–42 | 44,500 | |
| September 13 | VMI | Cary Field; Williamsburg, VA (rivalry) | L 10–13 | 14,000 | |
| September 20 | at Virginia Tech | Lane Stadium; Blacksburg, VA | L 3–7 | 27,500 | |
| September 27 | at Navy | Navy–Marine Corps Memorial Stadium; Annapolis, MD | L 6–45 | 18,215 | |
| October 4 | Wake Forest | Cary Field; Williamsburg, VA | L 7–27 | 15,800 | |
| October 11 | Dartmouth | Cary Field; Williamsburg, VA | W 17–14 | 14,500 | |
| October 18 | at Rutgers | Rutgers Stadium; Piscataway, NJ | W 21–18 | 16,825 | |
| October 25 | No. T–10 Delaware | Cary Field; Williamsburg, VA (rivalry) | L 3–7 | 11,600 | |
| November 1 | at East Carolina | Ficklen Memorial Stadium; Greenville, NC | L 23–31 | 18,600 | |
| November 8 | at Harvard | Harvard Stadium; Boston, MA | L 13–24 | 10,000 | |
| November 22 | at Richmond | City Stadium; Richmond, VA (rivalry) | L 14–26 | 14,700 | |
Rankings from AP Poll released prior to the game

== Roster ==
1980 William & Mary Tribe football team roster
Players
Coaches
Offense

| Pos. | # | Name | Class |
|---|---|---|---|
| OT | 79 | Bill Benner | Sr |
| RB | 18 | Keith Best | Sr |
| RB | 23 | Tom Franco | Sr |
| QB | 12 | Chris Garrity | Jr |
| FB | 30 | Joel Milik | Sr |
| QB | 14 | Dave Murphy | Fr |
| WR | 40 | Jeff Wolf | So |

Defense

| Pos. | # | Name | Class |
|---|---|---|---|
| DT | 78 | John Cannon | Jr |
| DT | 63 | Mike Murphy | Fr |
| DE | 55 | Dan Ness | So |
| DE | 41 | Paul Tyner | Sr |

Special teams

| Pos. | # | Name | Class |
|---|---|---|---|
| K | 3 | Laszlo Mike-Meyer | Fr |

Head coach

- Jimmye Laycock

Coordinators/assistant coaches

Legend

- (C) Team captain
- (S) Suspended
- (I) Ineligible
- Injured
- Redshirt
