= 1980 Temple Owls football team =

American college football season

1980 Temple Owls football
- Conference: Independent
- Record: 4–7
- Head coach: Wayne Hardin (11th season)
- Home stadium: Veterans Stadium

1980 NCAA Division I-A independents football records
	Conf.					Overall
Team	W		L		T	W		L		T
No. 2 Pittsburgh		–		–		11	–	1	–	0
Tennessee State		–		–		9	–	1	–	0
No. 5 Florida State		–		–		10	–	2	–	0
No. 8 Penn State		–		–		10	–	2	–	0
No. 9 Notre Dame		–		–		9	–	2	–	1
No. 18 Miami (FL)		–		–		9	–	3	–	0
Southern Miss		–		–		9	–	3	–	0
Navy		–		–		8	–	4	–	0
South Carolina		–		–		8	–	4	–	0
Virginia Tech		–		–		8	–	4	–	0
Boston College		–		–		7	–	4	–	0
Northeast Louisiana		–		–		7	–	4	–	0
Rutgers		–		–		7	–	4	–	0
UNLV		–		–		7	–	4	–	0
Tulane		–		–		7	–	5	–	0
Colgate		–		–		5	–	4	–	1
North Texas State		–		–		6	–	5	–	0
Villanova		–		–		6	–	5	–	0
West Virginia		–		–		6	–	6	–	0
Louisville		–		–		5	–	6	–	0
Richmond		–		–		5	–	6	–	0
Syracuse		–		–		5	–	6	–	0
East Carolina		–		–		4	–	7	–	0
Illinois State		–		–		4	–	7	–	0
Temple		–		–		4	–	7	–	0
Army		–		–		3	–	7	–	1
Holy Cross		–		–		3	–	8	–	0
Cincinnati		–		–		2	–	9	–	0
Memphis State		–		–		2	–	9	–	0
William & Mary		–		–		2	–	9	–	0
Georgia Tech		–		–		1	–	9	–	1
Rankings from AP Poll

The 1980 Temple Owls football team was an American football team that represented Temple University as an independent during the 1980 NCAA Division I-A football season. In its 11th season under head coach Wayne Hardin, the team compiled a 4–7 record and was outscored by a total of 262 to 170. The team played its home games at Veterans Stadium in Philadelphia.

== Schedule ==
Date	Opponent	Site	Result	Attendance	Source
September 13	Rutgers	Franklin Field; Philadelphia, PA	L 3–21	19,876	
September 20	Delaware	Veterans Stadium; Philadelphia, PA	L 7–28	23,013	
September 27	at No. 6 Pittsburgh	Pitt Stadium; Pittsburgh, PA	L 2–36	47,071	
October 4	No. T–4 (I-AA) Boston University	Veterans Stadium; Philadelphia, PA	W 53–6	10,375	
October 11	at Syracuse	Carrier Dome; Syracuse, NY	L 7–31	36,485	
October 18	Akron	Veterans Stadium; Philadelphia, PA	W 16–7	2,872	
October 25	at Cincinnati	Nippert Stadium; Cincinnati, OH	W 23–7	12,029	
November 1	at Louisville	Cardinal Stadium; Louisville, KY	W 17–12	13,436	
November 8	West Virginia	Veterans Stadium; Philadelphia, PA	L 28–41	14,995	
November 15	No. 9 Penn State	Veterans Stadium; Philadelphia, PA	L 7–50	49,313	
November 22	at Villanova	Villanova Stadium; Villanova, PA	L 7–23	10,800	
Rankings from AP Poll released prior to the game

== Roster ==
1980 Temple Owls football team roster
Players
Coaches
Offense

Pos.	#	Name	Class

Defense

Pos.	#	Name	Class
LB	36	Kevin Ross	Fr
DB	16	Mark McCants	Sr
DB/LB	43	Brett Hardenstine

Special teams

Pos.	#	Name	Class

Head coach

- Wayne Hardin

Coordinators/assistant coaches

Legend

- (C) Team captain
- (S) Suspended
- (I) Ineligible
- Injured
- Redshirt
