= 1980 Rhode Island Rams football team =

American college football season

1980 Rhode Island Rams football
- Conference: Yankee Conference
- Record: 2–9 (0–5 Yankee)
- Head coach: Bob Griffin (5th season)
- Defensive coordinator: Pete Adrian (5th season)
- Home stadium: Meade Stadium

1980 Yankee Conference football standings
	Conf.					Overall
Team	W		L		T	W		L		T
No. 9 Boston University $	5	–	0	–	0	9	–	2	–	0
No. T–10 UMass	4	–	1	–	0	7	–	3	–	0
No. T–10 Connecticut	3	–	2	–	0	7	–	3	–	0
New Hampshire	2	–	3	–	0	6	–	4	–	0
Maine	1	–	4	–	0	4	–	7	–	0
Rhode Island	0	–	5	–	0	2	–	9	–	0
$ – Conference champion; Rankings from Associated Press poll

The 1980 Rhode Island Rams football team was an American football team that represented the University of Rhode Island in the Yankee Conference during the 1980 NCAA Division I-AA football season. In their fifth season under head coach Bob Griffin, the Rams compiled a 2–9 record (0–5 against conference opponents) and finished last in the conference.

== Schedule ==
Date	Opponent	Site	Result	Attendance	Source
September 6	at Holy Cross*	Fitton Field; Worcester, MA	L 14–21	11,131	
September 13	Northeastern*	Meade Stadium; Kingston, RI	W 24–19	6,230	
September 20	at Maine	Alumni Field; Orono, ME	L 11–14	4,200	
October 4	No. 8 UMass^{†}	Meade Stadium; Kingston, RI	L 8–26	10,443	
October 11	at Virginia Tech*	Lane Stadium; Blacksburg, VA	L 7–34	40,100	
October 18	No. T–10 Boston University	Meade Stadium; Kingston, RI	L 13–24	3,280	
October 25	Southern Connecticut*	Meade Stadium; Kingston, RI	W 7–6	500	
November 1	at New Hampshire	Cowell Stadium; Durham, NH	L 28–31	5,280	
November 8	at No. 2 Lehigh*	Taylor Stadium; Bethleham, PA	L 10–23	10,000	
November 15	at Connecticut	Memorial Stadium; Storrs, CT (rivalry)	L 30–56	5,500	
November 22	at Brown*	Brown Stadium; Providence, RI (rivalry)	L 3–9	7,200	
*Non-conference game; ^{†}Homecoming; Rankings from AP Poll released prior to the game
