= 1980 Boston College Eagles football team =

American college football season

1980 Boston College Eagles football
- Conference: Independent
- Record: 7–4
- Head coach: Ed Chlebek (3rd season)
- Captains: Mike Mayock; Tim Sherwin
- Home stadium: Alumni Stadium

1980 NCAA Division I-A independents football records
	Conf.					Overall
Team	W		L		T	W		L		T
No. 2 Pittsburgh		–		–		11	–	1	–	0
Tennessee State		–		–		9	–	1	–	0
No. 5 Florida State		–		–		10	–	2	–	0
No. 8 Penn State		–		–		10	–	2	–	0
No. 9 Notre Dame		–		–		9	–	2	–	1
No. 18 Miami (FL)		–		–		9	–	3	–	0
Southern Miss		–		–		9	–	3	–	0
Navy		–		–		8	–	4	–	0
South Carolina		–		–		8	–	4	–	0
Virginia Tech		–		–		8	–	4	–	0
Boston College		–		–		7	–	4	–	0
Northeast Louisiana		–		–		7	–	4	–	0
Rutgers		–		–		7	–	4	–	0
UNLV		–		–		7	–	4	–	0
Tulane		–		–		7	–	5	–	0
Colgate		–		–		5	–	4	–	1
North Texas State		–		–		6	–	5	–	0
Villanova		–		–		6	–	5	–	0
West Virginia		–		–		6	–	6	–	0
Louisville		–		–		5	–	6	–	0
Richmond		–		–		5	–	6	–	0
Syracuse		–		–		5	–	6	–	0
East Carolina		–		–		4	–	7	–	0
Illinois State		–		–		4	–	7	–	0
Temple		–		–		4	–	7	–	0
Army		–		–		3	–	7	–	1
Holy Cross		–		–		3	–	8	–	0
Cincinnati		–		–		2	–	9	–	0
Memphis State		–		–		2	–	9	–	0
William & Mary		–		–		2	–	9	–	0
Georgia Tech		–		–		1	–	9	–	1
Rankings from AP Poll

The 1980 Boston College Eagles football team represented Boston College as an independent during the 1980 NCAA Division I-A football season. In its third and final season under head coach Ed Chlebek, the team compiled a 7–4 record and outscored opponents by a combined total of 199 to 186.

The team's statistical leaders included John Loughery with 1,519 passing yards, Shelby Gamble with 702 rushing yards, and Rob Rikard with 460 receiving yards.

The team played its home games at Alumni Stadium in Chestnut Hill, Massachusetts.

== Schedule ==
Date	Opponent	Site	Result	Attendance	Source
September 13	at No. 3 Pittsburgh	Pitt Stadium; Pittsburgh, PA	L 6–14	44,820	
September 20	No. 11 Stanford	Alumni Stadium; Chestnut Hill, MA	W 30–13	32,037	
September 27	at Villanova	Villanova Stadium; Villanova, PA	L 9–20	13,300	
October 4	at Navy	Navy–Marine Corps Memorial Stadium; Annapolis, MD	L 0–21	27,405	
October 11	Yale	Alumni Stadium; Chestnut Hill, MA	W 27–9	26,000	
October 18	at No. 7 Florida State	Campbell Stadium; Tallahassee, FL	L 7–41	52,396	
October 25	Army	Alumni Stadium; Chestnut Hill, MA	W 30–14	23,000	
November 1	at Air Force	Falcon Stadium; Colorado Springs, CO	W 23–0	16,018	
November 15	Syracuse	Alumni Stadium; Chestnut Hill, MA	W 27–16	22,000	
November 22	at No. T–10 (I-AA) UMass	Alumni Stadium; Hadley, MA (rivalry)	W 13–12	15,216	
November 29	Holy Cross	Alumni Stadium; Chestnut Hill, MA (rivalry)	W 27–26	27,400	
Rankings from AP Poll released prior to the game

== Roster ==
1980 Boston College Eagles football team roster
Players
Coaches
Offense

Pos.	#	Name	Class
C	62	Jack Belcher	So
RB	37	Kevin Benjamin	Jr
RB	34	Bob Biestek
WR	18	Brian Brennan	Fr
RB		Howard Brown
RB	42	Shelby Gamble
WR	21	Rich Green	Sr
QB	9	Doug Guyer	So
TE	82	Gary Kowalski
OT	70	Steve Lively	So
QB	7	John Loughery	So
RB	31	Jeff Medina	Jr
OL	79	Greg Michalec	Sr
G	75	Casey Muldoon	Sr
WR	86	Scott Nizolek	So
WR	1	John Ray	Jr
G	65	Gerry Raymond	Jr
RB		Dan Reeder	Fr
WR	12	Rob Rikard	Jr
QB	8	Dennis Scala	Jr
WR	85	Jon Schoen	So
TE	83	Tim Sherwin	Sr
RB	24	Leo Smith	Jr
G	76	Bill Stephanos	Sr

Defense

Pos.	#	Name	Class
DB	19	Doug Alston	Sr
LB	47	Craig Beal	Sr
LB	38	Jim Budness	Jr
SS	5	Vic Crawford	So
LB	99	Steve DeOssie	Fr
DB	6	Rich Dyer	Jr
DL	57	Joe Ferraro	Jr
DT	93	Dan Fox	So
DE	80	Mike Gunn	Sr
DL		Russell Joyner
DB	22	Cyril Keniry	Sr
S	20	Mike Mayock	Sr
DT	95	Joe Nash	Jr
DT	73	Todd Nelson	So
DL	72	Junior Poles
DB	15	George Radachowsky	Fr
DE	98	Lew Reynolds	Sr
DT	89	Mark Roopenian	Sr
DB	49	Jerry Stabile	Sr
DE	50	Greg Storr	Jr
LB	51	Bob Walton	Sr

Special teams

Pos.	#	Name	Class
K	10	John Cooper	Jr

Head coach

- Ed Chlebek

Coordinators/assistant coaches

Legend

- (C) Team captain
- (S) Suspended
- (I) Ineligible
- Injured
- Redshirt
