= 1980 Northeastern Huskies football team =

American college football season

1980 Northeastern Huskies football
- Conference: Independent
- Record: 2–9
- Head coach: Robert Lyons (9th season)
- Home stadium: Parsons Field

1980 NCAA Division I-AA independents football standings
	Conf.			Overall
Team	W	L	T	W		L		T
No. 1 Lehigh ^		–		9	–	1	–	2
No. 6 Delaware		–		9	–	2	–	0
Southeastern Louisiana		–		8	–	2	–	0
No. 8 Northwestern State		–		8	–	3	–	0
Portland State		–		8	–	3	–	0
Bucknell		–		6	–	4	–	0
James Madison		–		4	–	6	–	0
Lafayette		–		3	–	7	–	0
Nicholls State		–		2	–	9	–	0
Northeastern		–		2	–	9	–	0
^ – NCAA Division I-AA playoff participant; Rankings from Associated Press poll

The 1980 Northeastern Huskies football team was an American football team that represented Northeastern University as an independent during the 1980 NCAA Division I-AA football season. Led by ninth-year head coach Robert Lyons, the team compiled a 2–9 record.

== Schedule ==
Date	Opponent	Rank	Site	Result	Attendance	Source
September 13	at Rhode Island		Meade Stadium; Kingston, RI	L 19–24		
September 20	Connecticut		Parsons Field; Brookline, MA	L 6–34		
September 27	C. W. Post		Parsons Field; Brookline, MA	L 24–27		
October 4	at Springfield		Benedum Field; Springfield, MA	L 3–31	1,227	
October 11	Southern Connecticut		Parsons Field; Brookline, MA	W 18–15		
October 18	American International^{†}		Parsons Field; Brookline, MA	L 15–21	5,100	
October 25	New Hampshire		Parsons Field; Brookline, MA	L 12–48	1,600	
November 1	at Maine		Alumni Field; Orono, ME	L 24–35	2,009	
November 8	Central Connecticut		Parsons Field; Brookline, MA	W 21–20		
November 15	at Lehigh	No. 2	Taylor Stadium; Bethlehem, PA	L 19–42	7,363	
November 22	at Boston University	No. T–7	Nickerson Field; Boston, MA	L 19–35	3,212	
^{†}Homecoming; Rankings from Associated Press Poll released prior to the game
