= 1980 West Virginia Mountaineers football team =

American college football season

1980 West Virginia Mountaineers football
- Conference: Independent
- Record: 6–6
- Head coach: Don Nehlen (1st season)
- Offensive coordinator: Gary Tranquill (1st season)
- Home stadium: Mountaineer Field

1980 NCAA Division I-A independents football records
| | Conf. | | | | | Overall |
| Team | W | | L | | T | W | | L | | T |
|---|---|---|---|---|---|---|---|---|---|---|
| No. 2 Pittsburgh | | – | | – | | 11 | – | 1 | – | 0 |
| Tennessee State | | – | | – | | 9 | – | 1 | – | 0 |
| No. 5 Florida State | | – | | – | | 10 | – | 2 | – | 0 |
| No. 8 Penn State | | – | | – | | 10 | – | 2 | – | 0 |
| No. 9 Notre Dame | | – | | – | | 9 | – | 2 | – | 1 |
| No. 18 Miami (FL) | | – | | – | | 9 | – | 3 | – | 0 |
| Southern Miss | | – | | – | | 9 | – | 3 | – | 0 |
| Navy | | – | | – | | 8 | – | 4 | – | 0 |
| South Carolina | | – | | – | | 8 | – | 4 | – | 0 |
| Virginia Tech | | – | | – | | 8 | – | 4 | – | 0 |
| Boston College | | – | | – | | 7 | – | 4 | – | 0 |
| Northeast Louisiana | | – | | – | | 7 | – | 4 | – | 0 |
| Rutgers | | – | | – | | 7 | – | 4 | – | 0 |
| UNLV | | – | | – | | 7 | – | 4 | – | 0 |
| Tulane | | – | | – | | 7 | – | 5 | – | 0 |
| Colgate | | – | | – | | 5 | – | 4 | – | 1 |
| North Texas State | | – | | – | | 6 | – | 5 | – | 0 |
| Villanova | | – | | – | | 6 | – | 5 | – | 0 |
| West Virginia | | – | | – | | 6 | – | 6 | – | 0 |
| Louisville | | – | | – | | 5 | – | 6 | – | 0 |
| Richmond | | – | | – | | 5 | – | 6 | – | 0 |
| Syracuse | | – | | – | | 5 | – | 6 | – | 0 |
| East Carolina | | – | | – | | 4 | – | 7 | – | 0 |
| Illinois State | | – | | – | | 4 | – | 7 | – | 0 |
| Temple | | – | | – | | 4 | – | 7 | – | 0 |
| Army | | – | | – | | 3 | – | 7 | – | 1 |
| Holy Cross | | – | | – | | 3 | – | 8 | – | 0 |
| Cincinnati | | – | | – | | 2 | – | 9 | – | 0 |
| Memphis State | | – | | – | | 2 | – | 9 | – | 0 |
| William & Mary | | – | | – | | 2 | – | 9 | – | 0 |
| Georgia Tech | | – | | – | | 1 | – | 9 | – | 1 |
Rankings from AP Poll

The 1980 West Virginia Mountaineers football team represented West Virginia University as an independent during the 1980 NCAA Division I-A football season. It was the Mountaineers' 88th overall season. The team was led by head coach Don Nehlen, in his first year, and played their home games at their new stadium, Mountaineer Field in Morgantown, West Virginia. They finished the season with a record of six wins and six losses (6–6 overall).

== Schedule ==
| Date | Opponent | Site | Result | Attendance | Source |
|---|---|---|---|---|---|
| September 6 | Cincinnati | Mountaineer Field; Morgantown, WV | W 41–27 | 50,150 | |
| September 13 | at Colorado State | Hughes Stadium; Fort Collins, CO | W 52–24 | 23,972 | |
| September 20 | Maryland | Mountaineer Field; Morgantown, WV (rivalry) | L 11–14 | 48,038 | |
| September 27 | Richmond | Mountaineer Field; Morgantown, WV | W 31–28 | 40,847 | |
| October 4 | Virginia^{†} | Mountaineer Field; Morgantown, WV | W 45–21 | 45,088 | |
| October 11 | at Hawaii | Aloha Stadium; Halawa, HI | L 13–16 | 41,889 | |
| October 18 | at No. 11 Pittsburgh | Pitt Stadium; Pittsburgh, PA (rivalry) | L 14–42 | 55,130 | |
| October 25 | No. 13 Penn State | Mountaineer Field; Morgantown, WV (rivalry) | L 15–20 | 49,194 | |
| November 1 | at Virginia Tech | Lane Stadium; Blacksburg, VA (rivalry) | L 11–34 | 45,200 | |
| November 8 | at Temple | Veterans Stadium; Philadelphia, PA | W 41–28 | 14,995 | |
| November 15 | at Rutgers | Rutgers Stadium; Piscataway, NJ | W 24–15 | 16,400 | |
| November 22 | Syracuse | Mountaineer Field; Morgantown, WV (rivalry) | L 7–20 | 34,441 | |
^{†}Homecoming; Rankings from AP Poll released prior to the game

== Roster ==
1980 West Virginia Mountaineers football team roster
Players
Coaches
Offense

| Pos. | # | Name | Class |
|---|---|---|---|
| WR | 3 | Billy Evans | Jr |
| RB | 4 | Eldridge Dixon | Jr |
| QB | 7 | Curt Cignetti | So |
| QB | 8 | Roger Dietz | Jr |
| WR | 9 | Cedric Thomas | Sr |
| QB | 12 | Oliver Luck | Jr |
| RB | 31 | Robert Alexander | Sr |
| FB | 46 | Walter Easley | Sr |
| G | 79 | Mike Durrette | Jr |
| WR | 81 | Darrell Miller | Jr |
| WR | 89 | Darryl Weatherspoon | Jr |
| TE | 94 | Mark Nagy | Sr |

Defense

| Pos. | # | Name | Class |
|---|---|---|---|
| DB | 15 | Sedrick King | Jr |
| RB | 18 | Ed Armstrong | Jr |
| DB | 40 | Fulton Walker | Sr |
| LB | 50 | Dennis Fowlkes | So |
| LB | 90 | Darryl Talley | So |
| DT | 91 | Todd Campbell | So |
| DE | 95 | Delbert Fowler | Sr |
| OLB | 96 | James Simpson | Sr |
| MG | 97 | John Bendana | Sr |
| DL | 98 | Danny Lee | Sr |
| DT | 99 | Calvin Turner | Jr |

Special teams

| Pos. | # | Name | Class |
|---|---|---|---|
| K | 1 | Steve Sinclair | Sr |
| P | 5 | Curt Carion | Sr |

Head coach

- Don Nehlen

Coordinators/assistant coaches

Legend

- (C) Team captain
- (S) Suspended
- (I) Ineligible
- Injured
- Redshirt
