= 1980 Cincinnati Bearcats football team =

American college football season

1980 Cincinnati Bearcats football
- Conference: Independent
- Record: 2–9
- Head coach: Ralph Staub (4th season)
- Defensive coordinator: Mark Duffner (4th season)
- Home stadium: Nippert Stadium

1980 NCAA Division I-A independents football records
	Conf.					Overall
Team	W		L		T	W		L		T
No. 2 Pittsburgh		–		–		11	–	1	–	0
Tennessee State		–		–		9	–	1	–	0
No. 5 Florida State		–		–		10	–	2	–	0
No. 8 Penn State		–		–		10	–	2	–	0
No. 9 Notre Dame		–		–		9	–	2	–	1
No. 18 Miami (FL)		–		–		9	–	3	–	0
Southern Miss		–		–		9	–	3	–	0
Navy		–		–		8	–	4	–	0
South Carolina		–		–		8	–	4	–	0
Virginia Tech		–		–		8	–	4	–	0
Boston College		–		–		7	–	4	–	0
Northeast Louisiana		–		–		7	–	4	–	0
Rutgers		–		–		7	–	4	–	0
UNLV		–		–		7	–	4	–	0
Tulane		–		–		7	–	5	–	0
Colgate		–		–		5	–	4	–	1
North Texas State		–		–		6	–	5	–	0
Villanova		–		–		6	–	5	–	0
West Virginia		–		–		6	–	6	–	0
Louisville		–		–		5	–	6	–	0
Richmond		–		–		5	–	6	–	0
Syracuse		–		–		5	–	6	–	0
East Carolina		–		–		4	–	7	–	0
Illinois State		–		–		4	–	7	–	0
Temple		–		–		4	–	7	–	0
Army		–		–		3	–	7	–	1
Holy Cross		–		–		3	–	8	–	0
Cincinnati		–		–		2	–	9	–	0
Memphis State		–		–		2	–	9	–	0
William & Mary		–		–		2	–	9	–	0
Georgia Tech		–		–		1	–	9	–	1
Rankings from AP Poll

The 1980 Cincinnati Bearcats football team represented University of Cincinnati as an independent during the 1980 NCAA Division I-A football season. The Bearcats, led by head coach Ralph Staub, participated as independent and played their home games at Nippert Stadium.

== Schedule ==
Date	Opponent	Site	Result	Attendance	Source
September 6	at West Virginia	Mountaineer Field; Morgantown, WV	L 27–41	50,150	
September 13	at Tulsa	Skelly Field; Tulsa, OK	L 13–31	19,914	
September 20	at Rutgers	Rutgers Stadium; Piscataway, NJ	L 7–24	17,800	
September 27	Wichita State	Nippert Stadium; Cincinnati, OH	L 8–13		
October 11	at Villanova	Villanova Stadium; Villanova, PA	L 6–23	13,400	
October 18	at No. 15 South Carolina	Williams–Brice Stadium; Columbia, SC	L 7–49	56,599	
October 25	Temple	Nippert Stadium; Cincinnati, OH	L 7–23	12,029	
November 1	at Richmond	City Stadium; Richmond, VA	L 10–24	9,300	
November 8	Memphis State	Nippert Stadium; Cincinnati, OH (rivalry)	W 14–10	7,117	
November 15	at Louisville	Fairgrounds Stadium; Louisville, KY (rivalry)	L 0–20	12,629	
November 22	Miami (OH)	Nippert Stadium; Cincinnati, OH (Victory Bell)	W 23–13	12,158	
Rankings from AP Poll released prior to the game

== Roster ==
1980 Cincinnati Bearcats football team roster
Players
Coaches
Offense

Pos.	#	Name	Class
QB	6	Danny Barrett	So
C	50	Chris Bell	Jr
QB	7	Steve Bell
RB	3	James Bettis	Jr
G	61	Joe Caleca	Sr
TE	89	Larry Gill	Sr
FB	26	Don Goodman	Fr
C	52	David Handwerker	Jr
RB	34	Allen Harvin	So
C	51	Scott Heineman	Jr
RB	26	Howard Hill	So
FB	24	George Jamison	Fr
QB	19	Scott Moeschl
QB	8	John Meinerding
OT	69	Kari Yli-Renko	Jr

Defense

Pos.	#	Name	Class
LB	35	Mike Brookins	Jr
CB	21	Joe Curl	So
DB	10	Mel Jenkins	Fr
LB	59	George Jones	Jr
DB	23	Steve Ries	Jr
DB	44	Tim Schira	Jr
DB	43	Jim Schmidt	Jr
LB	45	Karl Woods	Sr

Special teams

Pos.	#	Name	Class
K	13	Rich Karlis	Sr
P	2	Phill Peckich	So

Head coach

- Ralph Staub

Coordinators/assistant coaches

Legend

- (C) Team captain
- (S) Suspended
- (I) Ineligible
- Injured
- Redshirt

== Team players in the NFL ==
No Eastern Illinois players were selected in the 1981 NFL draft.

The following finished their college career in 1980, were not drafted, but played in the NFL.

Player	Position	First NFL team
Rich Karlis	Kicker	Houston Oilers
