= 1980 Colgate Red Raiders football team =

American college football season

1980 Colgate Red Raiders football
- Conference: Independent
- Record: 5–4–1
- Head coach: Frederick Dunlap (5th season)
- Captains: Jeff King; Gene Young
- Home stadium: Andy Kerr Stadium

1980 NCAA Division I-A independents football records
	Conf.					Overall
Team	W		L		T	W		L		T
No. 2 Pittsburgh		–		–		11	–	1	–	0
Tennessee State		–		–		9	–	1	–	0
No. 5 Florida State		–		–		10	–	2	–	0
No. 8 Penn State		–		–		10	–	2	–	0
No. 9 Notre Dame		–		–		9	–	2	–	1
No. 18 Miami (FL)		–		–		9	–	3	–	0
Southern Miss		–		–		9	–	3	–	0
Navy		–		–		8	–	4	–	0
South Carolina		–		–		8	–	4	–	0
Virginia Tech		–		–		8	–	4	–	0
Boston College		–		–		7	–	4	–	0
Northeast Louisiana		–		–		7	–	4	–	0
Rutgers		–		–		7	–	4	–	0
UNLV		–		–		7	–	4	–	0
Tulane		–		–		7	–	5	–	0
Colgate		–		–		5	–	4	–	1
North Texas State		–		–		6	–	5	–	0
Villanova		–		–		6	–	5	–	0
West Virginia		–		–		6	–	6	–	0
Louisville		–		–		5	–	6	–	0
Richmond		–		–		5	–	6	–	0
Syracuse		–		–		5	–	6	–	0
East Carolina		–		–		4	–	7	–	0
Illinois State		–		–		4	–	7	–	0
Temple		–		–		4	–	7	–	0
Army		–		–		3	–	7	–	1
Holy Cross		–		–		3	–	8	–	0
Cincinnati		–		–		2	–	9	–	0
Memphis State		–		–		2	–	9	–	0
William & Mary		–		–		2	–	9	–	0
Georgia Tech		–		–		1	–	9	–	1
Rankings from AP Poll

The 1980 Colgate Red Raiders football team was an American football team that represented Colgate University as an independent during the 1980 NCAA Division I-A football season. In its fifth season under head coach Frederick Dunlap, the team compiled an identical record to the previous year, 5–4–1. Jeff King and Gene Young were the team captains.

The team played its home games at Andy Kerr Stadium in Hamilton, New York.

== Schedule ==
Date	Opponent	Site	Result	Attendance	Source
September 6	at No. 18 Penn State	Beaver Stadium; State College, PA	L 10–54	78,926	
September 20	at Lehigh	Taylor Stadium; Bethlehem, PA	T 17–17	8,000	
September 27	Cornell	Andy Kerr Stadium; Hamilton, NY (rivalry)	W 38–20	7,000	
October 4	at Connecticut	Memorial Stadium; Storrs, CT	L 21–24	11,439	
October 11	Holy Cross	Andy Kerr Stadium; Hamilton, NY	W 38–7	5,000	
October 18	at Princeton	Palmer Stadium; Princeton, NJ	L 10–14	9,258	
October 25	Columbia	Andy Kerr Stadium; Hamilton, NY	W 35–22	1,000	
November 1	Lafayette	Andy Kerr Stadium; Hamilton, NY	W 44–0	3,500	
November 8	at Bucknell	Memorial Stadium; Lewisburg, PA	W 17–14	2,500	
November 22	at Rutgers	Rutgers Stadium; Piscataway, NJ	L 13–35	15,400	
Rankings from AP Poll released prior to the game

== Leading players ==
Two trophies were awarded to the Red Raiders' most valuable players in 1980:

- Tony Bubniak, center, received the Andy Kerr Trophy, awarded to the most valuable offensive player.
- Jeff King, defensive tackle, received the Hal W. Lahar Trophy, awarded to the most valuable defensive player.

Statistical leaders for the 1980 Red Raiders included:

- Rushing: Tom McChesney, 544 yards and 5 touchdowns on 122 attempts
- Passing: Wayne Schuchts, 1,556 yards, 101 completions and 10 touchdowns on 206 attempts
- Receiving: Tom Rogers, 720 yards and 4 touchdowns on 46 receptions
- Total offense: Wayne Schuchts, 1,652 yards (1,556 passing, 96 rushing)
- Scoring: Brian Byrne, 52 points from 25 PATs and 9 field goals
- All-purpose yards: Rich Erenberg, 1,261 yards (496 rushing, 396 kickoff returning, 293 receiving, 76 punt returning)
- Tackles: Joe Murphy, 123 total tackles
- Sacks: Kelly Robinson, 9.5 quarterback sacks
