= 1980 Syracuse Orangemen football team =

American college football season

1980 Syracuse Orangemen football
- Conference: Independent
- Record: 5–6
- Head coach: Frank Maloney (7th season)
- Offensive coordinator: Tom Coughlin (5th season)
- Captains: Jim Collins; Joe Morris; Dave Warner
- Home stadium: Carrier Dome

1980 NCAA Division I-A independents football records
	Conf.					Overall
Team	W		L		T	W		L		T
No. 2 Pittsburgh		–		–		11	–	1	–	0
Tennessee State		–		–		9	–	1	–	0
No. 5 Florida State		–		–		10	–	2	–	0
No. 8 Penn State		–		–		10	–	2	–	0
No. 9 Notre Dame		–		–		9	–	2	–	1
No. 18 Miami (FL)		–		–		9	–	3	–	0
Southern Miss		–		–		9	–	3	–	0
Navy		–		–		8	–	4	–	0
South Carolina		–		–		8	–	4	–	0
Virginia Tech		–		–		8	–	4	–	0
Boston College		–		–		7	–	4	–	0
Northeast Louisiana		–		–		7	–	4	–	0
Rutgers		–		–		7	–	4	–	0
UNLV		–		–		7	–	4	–	0
Tulane		–		–		7	–	5	–	0
Colgate		–		–		5	–	4	–	1
North Texas State		–		–		6	–	5	–	0
Villanova		–		–		6	–	5	–	0
West Virginia		–		–		6	–	6	–	0
Louisville		–		–		5	–	6	–	0
Richmond		–		–		5	–	6	–	0
Syracuse		–		–		5	–	6	–	0
East Carolina		–		–		4	–	7	–	0
Illinois State		–		–		4	–	7	–	0
Temple		–		–		4	–	7	–	0
Army		–		–		3	–	7	–	1
Holy Cross		–		–		3	–	8	–	0
Cincinnati		–		–		2	–	9	–	0
Memphis State		–		–		2	–	9	–	0
William & Mary		–		–		2	–	9	–	0
Georgia Tech		–		–		1	–	9	–	1
Rankings from AP Poll

The 1980 Syracuse Orangemen football team represented Syracuse University as an independent during the 1980 NCAA Division I-A football season. The team was led by head coach Frank Maloney and played their home games in the newly-constructed Carrier Dome in Syracuse, New York. Syracuse finished the season with a 5–6 record. At the conclusion of the season, Maloney resigned with a record of 32–46 after seven seasons.

== Schedule ==
Date	Opponent	Site	Result	Attendance	Source
September 13	at No. 1 Ohio State	Ohio Stadium; Columbus, OH	L 21–31	86,643	
September 20	Miami (OH)	Carrier Dome; Syracuse, NY	W 36–24	50,564	
September 27	Northwestern	Carrier Dome; Syracuse, NY	W 42–21	34,739	
October 4	Kansas	Carrier Dome; Syracuse, NY	L 8–23	43,126	
October 11	Temple	Carrier Dome; Syracuse, NY	W 31–7	36,485	
October 18	at No. 12 Penn State	Beaver Stadium; University Park, PA (rivalry)	L 7–24	84,790	
October 25	Rutgers	Carrier Dome; Syracuse, NY	W 17–9	39,937	
November 1	No. 11 Pittsburgh	Carrier Dome; Syracuse, NY (rivalry)	L 6–43	50,243	
November 8	Navy	Carrier Dome; Syracuse, NY	L 3–6	50,350	
November 15	at Boston College	Alumni Stadium; Chestnut Hill, MA	L 16–27	22,000	
November 22	at West Virginia	Mountaineer Field; Morgantown, WV (rivalry)	W 20–7	34,441	
Rankings from AP Poll released prior to the game

== Game summaries ==
=== At Ohio State ===
Syracuse Orangemen (0–0) at #1 Ohio State Buckeyes (0–0)

Quarter	1	2	3	4	Total
Syracuse	14	7	0	0	21
Ohio State	3	6	15	7	31

at Ohio Stadium, Columbus, Ohio

- Date: September 13
- Game time: 1:30 p.m.
- Game weather: Hazy, 85 °F (29 °C)
- Game attendance: 86,643
- Box Score

Game information

First quarter

- SYR – Tony Sidor 21-yard pass from Dave Warner (Gary Anderson kick), 10:47. Syracuse 7–0. Drive: 8 plays, 80 yards, 4:13.
- SYR – Chris Jilleba 4-yard pass from Dave Warner (Gary Anderson kick), 9:10. Syracuse 14–0. Drive: 3 plays, 4 yards, 1:23.
- OSU – Vlade Janakievski 35-yard field goal, 3:08. Syracuse 14–3. Drive: 14 plays, 62 yards, 6:02.

Second quarter

- SYR – Dave Warner 1-yard run (Gary Anderson kick), 13:38. Syracuse 21–3. Drive: 10 plays, 80 yards, 4:30.
- OSU – Vlade Janakievski 34-yard field goal, 3:36. Syracuse 21–6. Drive: 11 plays, 70 yards, 3:39.
- OSU – Vlade Janakievski 42-yard field goal, 0:10. Syracuse 21–9. Drive: 9 plays, 46 yards, 1:39.

Third quarter

- OSU – Doug Donley 37-yard pass from Art Schlichter (Vlade Janakievski kick), 12:45. Syracuse 21–16. Drive: 6 plays, 80 yards, 2:15.
- OSU – Ricky Johnson 4-yard run (pass good), 4:39. Ohio State 24–21. Drive: 10 plays, 81 yards, 4:08.

Fourth quarter

- OSU – Art Schlichter 10-yard run (Vlade Janakievski kick), 1:36. Ohio State 31–21. Drive: 9 plays, 62 yards, 4:21.

Top passers

- SYR – Dave Warner – 10/16, 91 yards, 2 TD, INT
- OSU – Art Schlichter – 7/13, 107 yards, TD, 2 INT

Top rushers

- SYR – Joe Morris – 26 rushes, 150 yards
- OSU – Calvin Murray – 18 rushes, 117 yards

Top receivers

- SYR – Tony Sidor – 7 receptions, 74 yards, TD
- OSU – Doug Donley – 2 receptions, 58 yards, TD

No. 11 Pittsburgh Panthers at Syracuse Orangemen – Game summary

Quarter	1	2	3	4	Total
No. 11 Panthers	12	14	3	14	43
Orangemen	0	6	0	0	6

at Carrier Dome • Syracuse, NY

- Date: November 1
- Game time: 4:00 PM EST
- Game attendance: 50,243
- TV announcers (ABC): Bill Flemming (play-by-play) and Frank Broyles (color commentator)

Statistics	PITT	SYR
First downs		
Total yards		
Rushes/yards		
Passing yards		
Passing: Comp–Att–Int		
Time of possession		

Team	Category	Player	Statistics
Pittsburgh	Passing		
Pittsburgh	Rushing		
Pittsburgh	Receiving		
Syracuse	Passing		
Syracuse	Rushing		
Syracuse	Receiving		

Scoring summary

Quarter	Time	Drive			Team	Scoring information	Score	
Quarter	Time	Plays	Yards	TOP	Team	Scoring information	Pittsburgh	Syracuse
1					Pittsburgh	36-yard field goal by Trout	3	0
1					Pittsburgh	34-yard field goal by Trout	6	0
1					Pittsburgh	McCall 6-yard touchdown reception from Trocano, 2-point pass incomplete	12	0
2					Pittsburgh	McMillan 39-yard touchdown run, Trout kick good	19	0
2					Pittsburgh	McMillan 45-yard touchdown run, Trout kick good	26	0
2					Syracuse	Warner 1-yard touchdown run, 2-point run failed	26	6
3					Pittsburgh	26-yard field goal by Trout	29	6
4					Pittsburgh	Collins 54-yard touchdown reception from Trocano, Trout kick good	36	6
4					Pittsburgh	Collins 8-yard touchdown reception from Trocano, Trout kick good	43	6
"TOP" = time of possession. For other American football terms, see Glossary of American football.							43	6

== Roster ==
1980 Syracuse Orange football team roster
Players
Coaches
Offense

Pos.	#	Name	Class
TE	85	Marty Chalk	Fr
RB	45	Jaime Covington	Fr
C	52	Gerry Feehery	So
TE	84	Mike Feldman	So
QB	8	Jeff Fischer	So
OT	59	Andrew Gissinger	Sr
G	78	Gordon Grownkowski	Jr
WR	82	Marcus Hackett	Fr
RB	36	Dennis Hartman	Sr
G	61	Tony Hazzan	Jr
TE	49	Chris Jilleba	So
G	66	John Lally	Jr
RB	41	Ken Mandeville	Sr
WR	86	Frank Marone	So
OT	79	John McCollom	Jr
RB	44	Glenn Moore	Fr
WR	13	Dennis Morgis	So
RB	47	Joe Morris	Jr
G	63	Joe Nett	So
RB	42	Joe Pruitt	So
TE	81	Tony Sidor	Sr
C	56	Richard Sidor	So
QB	11	Dave Warner	Jr
WR	9	Tim Wilson	Sr
WR	17	Paul Zambuto	Jr
RB	43	Brent Ziegler	Fr

Defense

Pos.	#	Name	Class
DB	20	Bob Arkellpane	Sr
LB	57	Craig Bingham	Jr
DB	32	Ike Bogasian	Jr
DT	77	Herb Butzke	So
DB	4	Derrick Carr	Fr
DE	70	Mike Charles	So
LB	33	Jim Collins	Sr
DB	22	Derek Frederickson	So
DL	89	Chris Hand	So
DB	35	Andrew Hurley	Fr
DB	18	Cedric Hinton	Jr
DE	93	Ralph Joline	So
DB	19	Jerry Kilpatrick	Jr
DL	83	Jamie Kimmel	Fr
LB	58	Ken Kollar	Sr
DB	3	Glen Lewis	So
DE	95	Robert Manning	So
DB	29	Greg Najac	Jr
DT	75	Guy Neugebauer	Sr
LB	30	Guy Ruff	Jr
DB	15	Russ Spitz	Jr
LB	26	Thomas Seibert	Jr
DT	98	Blaise Winter	Fr
LB	48	Mike Zunic	Jr

Special teams

Pos.	#	Name	Class
K	1	Gary Anderson	Jr
P	99	Joe Goodwill	Sr

Head coach

- Frank Maloney

Coordinators/assistant coaches

Legend

- (C) Team captain
- (S) Suspended
- (I) Ineligible
- Injured
- Redshirt

== Team players in the NFL ==
Player	Position	Round	Pick	NFL club
Jim Collins	Linebacker	2	43	Los Angeles Rams
Andrew Gissinger	Tackle	6	141	San Diego Chargers
