= Dick Bedesem =

American football player and coach (1931–1999)

Biographical details
- Born: January 22, 1931
- Died: October 6, 1999 (aged 68); Abington, Pennsylvania, U.S.

Playing career
- 1950–1952: Villanova

Coaching career (HC unless noted)
- 1955–1956: La Salle College HS (PA) (assistant)
- 1957–1970: Bishop Egan HS (PA)
- 1970–1971: Archbishop Wood HS (PA)
- 1973–1974: Temple (DB)
- 1975–1980: Villanova
- 1981: Pittsburgh (assistant)
- 1984–1986: Neshaminy HS (PA)
- 1987–1991: Delaware Valley
- 1992–1994: Neshaminy HS (PA)

Head coaching record
- Overall: 47–67–2 (college); 140–84–7 (high school)

Richard V. Bedesem Sr. (January 22, 1931 – October 6, 1999) was an American football player and coach. He served as the head football coach at Villanova University from 1975 to 1980 and at Delaware Valley College from 1987 to 1991, compiling a career college football record of 47–67–2. Bedesem was also an assistant football coach at Temple University and the University of Pittsburgh. He died of congestive heart failure on October 6, 1999, at Abington Memorial Hospital in Abington, Pennsylvania.

== Head coaching record ==
=== College ===
Year	Team	Overall	Conference	Standing	Bowl/playoffs
Villanova Wildcats (NCAA Division I / I-A independent) (1975–1980)
1975	Villanova	4–7			
1976	Villanova	6–4–1			
1977	Villanova	4–7			
1978	Villanova	5–6			
1979	Villanova	5–6			
1980	Villanova	6–5			
Villanova:		30–35–1			
Delaware Valley Aggies (Middle Atlantic Conference) (1987–1991)
1987	Delaware Valley	3–6–1	3–5–1	7th	
1988	Delaware Valley	5–5	3–5	6th	
1989	Delaware Valley	3–7	3–5	6th	
1990	Delaware Valley	3–7	2–6	7th	
1991	Delaware Valley	3–7	3–5	T–5th	
Delaware Valley:		17–32–1	14–26–1		
Total:		47–67–2			
