= Ralph Staub (American football) =

American football player and coach (1928–2022)

Biographical details
- Born: April 11, 1928; Cincinnati, Ohio, U.S.
- Died: January 1, 2022 (aged 93); Jupiter, Florida, U.S.

Playing career
- 1949–1951: Cincinnati
- Position: End

Coaching career (HC unless noted)
- 1955−1963: Greenhills HS (OH)
- 1964−1968: Cincinnati (OL)
- 1969: Northwestern (OL)
- 1970–1976: Ohio State (assistant)
- 1977–1980: Cincinnati
- 1982–1983: Houston Oilers (DL)
- 1984: Oklahoma Outlaws (assistant)

Head coaching record
- Overall: 14–28–2 (college)

Ralph Staub (April 11, 1928 – January 1, 2022) was an American football player and coach. He served as the head football coach at the University of Cincinnati from 1977 to 1980, compiling a record of 14–28–2.

== Head coaching record ==
Year	Team	Overall	Conference	Standing	Bowl/playoffs
Cincinnati Bearcats (NCAA Division I/I-A independent) (1977–1980)
1977	Cincinnati	5–4–2			
1978	Cincinnati	5–6			
1979	Cincinnati	2–9			
1980	Cincinnati	2–9			
Cincinnati:		14–28–2			
Total:		14–28–2			
