= 1980 Tennessee State Tigers football team =

American college football season

1980 Tennessee State Tigers football
- Conference: Independent
- Record: 9–1
- Head coach: John Merritt (18th season)
- Home stadium: Hale Stadium; Dudley Field

1980 NCAA Division I-A independents football records
	Conf.					Overall
Team	W		L		T	W		L		T
No. 2 Pittsburgh		–		–		11	–	1	–	0
Tennessee State		–		–		9	–	1	–	0
No. 5 Florida State		–		–		10	–	2	–	0
No. 8 Penn State		–		–		10	–	2	–	0
No. 9 Notre Dame		–		–		9	–	2	–	1
No. 18 Miami (FL)		–		–		9	–	3	–	0
Southern Miss		–		–		9	–	3	–	0
Navy		–		–		8	–	4	–	0
South Carolina		–		–		8	–	4	–	0
Virginia Tech		–		–		8	–	4	–	0
Boston College		–		–		7	–	4	–	0
Northeast Louisiana		–		–		7	–	4	–	0
Rutgers		–		–		7	–	4	–	0
UNLV		–		–		7	–	4	–	0
Tulane		–		–		7	–	5	–	0
Colgate		–		–		5	–	4	–	1
North Texas State		–		–		6	–	5	–	0
Villanova		–		–		6	–	5	–	0
West Virginia		–		–		6	–	6	–	0
Louisville		–		–		5	–	6	–	0
Richmond		–		–		5	–	6	–	0
Syracuse		–		–		5	–	6	–	0
East Carolina		–		–		4	–	7	–	0
Illinois State		–		–		4	–	7	–	0
Temple		–		–		4	–	7	–	0
Army		–		–		3	–	7	–	1
Holy Cross		–		–		3	–	8	–	0
Cincinnati		–		–		2	–	9	–	0
Memphis State		–		–		2	–	9	–	0
William & Mary		–		–		2	–	9	–	0
Georgia Tech		–		–		1	–	9	–	1
Rankings from AP Poll

The 1980 Tennessee State Tigers football team was an American college football team that represented Tennessee State University as an independent during the 1980 NCAA Division I-A football season. Led by 18th-year head coach John Merritt, the Tigers compiled a record of 9–1.

== Schedule ==
Date	Opponent	Site	Result	Attendance	Source
September 13	Jackson State	Dudley Field; Nashville, TN	W 20–0		
September 27	vs. Texas Southern	Farrington Field; Fort Worth, TX	W 13–3	2,000	
October 4	Long Beach State	Hale Stadium; Nashville, TN	W 35–18	15,203	
October 11	at Grambling State	Grambling Stadium; Grambling, LA	L 27–52	13,571	
October 18	vs. Alabama State	Legion Field; Birmingham, AL	W 35–17	8,000	
October 25	at Nicholls State	John L. Guidry Stadium; Thibodaux, LA	W 40–15	10,050	
November 1	Southern	Dudley Field; Nashville, TN	W 49–9	28,000	
November 8	at Central State (OH)	McPherson Stadium; Wilberforce, OH	W 30–8		
November 15	North Carolina A&T	Hale Stadium; Nashville, TN	W 25–16	10,000	
November 22	Kentucky State	Hale Stadium; Nashville, TN	W 38–13	10,000	
