= 1980 Delaware Fightin' Blue Hens football team =

American college football season

1980 Delaware Fightin' Blue Hens football
- Conference: Independent
- Record: 9–2
- Head coach: Tubby Raymond (15th season)
- Offensive coordinator: Ted Kempski (13th season)
- Offensive scheme: Delaware Wing-T
- Base defense: 5–2
- Home stadium: Delaware Stadium

1980 NCAA Division I-AA independents football standings
	Conf.			Overall
Team	W	L	T	W		L		T
No. 1 Lehigh ^		–		9	–	1	–	2
No. 6 Delaware		–		9	–	2	–	0
Southeastern Louisiana		–		8	–	2	–	0
No. 8 Northwestern State		–		8	–	3	–	0
Portland State		–		8	–	3	–	0
Bucknell		–		6	–	4	–	0
James Madison		–		4	–	6	–	0
Lafayette		–		3	–	7	–	0
Nicholls State		–		2	–	9	–	0
Northeastern		–		2	–	9	–	0
^ – NCAA Division I-AA playoff participant; Rankings from Associated Press poll

The 1980 Delaware Fightin' Blue Hens football team represented the University of Delaware as an independent during the 1980 NCAA Division I-AA football season. Led by 15th-year head coach, Tubby Raymond, the Fightin' Blue Hens finished the season with a record of 9–2, but failed to make the postseason. The team played its home games at Delaware Stadium in Newark, Delaware.

== Schedule ==
Date	Opponent	Rank	Site	Result	Attendance	Source
September 13	West Chester		Delaware Stadium; Newark, DE (rivalry)	W 28–7	20,743	
September 20	at Temple		Veterans Stadium; Philadelphia, PA	W 28–7	23,013	
September 27	Morgan State	No. 4	Delaware Stadium; Newark, DE	W 40–7	21,943	
October 4	at No. 10 Lehigh	No. 2	Taylor Stadium; Bethlehem, PA (rivalry)	L 20–27	14,500	
October 11	at No. T–3 UMass	No. T–10	Alumni Stadium; Hadley, MA	W 21–17	10,400	
October 18	No. 2 (D-II) Northern Michigan^{†}	No. 6	Delaware Stadium; Newark, DE	L 7–22	22,555	
October 25	at William & Mary	No. T–10	Cary Field; Williamsburg, VA (rivalry)	W 7–3	11,600	
November 1	Villanova	No. 9	Delaware Stadium; Newark, DE (rivalry)	W 17–7	22,680	
November 8	Merchant Marine	No. 9	Delaware Stadium; Newark, DE	W 59–13	15,508	
November 15	Maine	No. 8	Delaware Stadium; Newark, DE	W 35–6		
November 22	Youngstown State	No. 6	Delaware Stadium; Newark, DE	W 20–13	17,812	
^{†}Homecoming; Rankings from AP Poll released prior to the game

== Roster ==
1980 Delaware Fightin' Blue Hens football team roster
Players			Coaches
Offense: Pos. / # / Name / Class	Defense: Pos. / # / Name / Class	Special teams: Pos. / # / Name / Class; K / 9 / Tom Oscar / Jr	Head coach: Tubby Raymond; Coordinators/assistant coaches Legend: (C) Team captain; (S) Suspended; (I) Ineligible; Injured; Redshirt; Roster
