= 1980 Virginia Tech Gobblers football team =

American college football season

1980 Virginia Tech Gobblers football

Peach Bowl, L 10–20 vs. Miami (FL)
- Conference: Independent
- Record: 8–4
- Head coach: Bill Dooley (3rd season)
- Home stadium: Lane Stadium

1980 NCAA Division I-A independents football records
	Conf.					Overall
Team	W		L		T	W		L		T
No. 2 Pittsburgh		–		–		11	–	1	–	0
Tennessee State		–		–		9	–	1	–	0
No. 5 Florida State		–		–		10	–	2	–	0
No. 8 Penn State		–		–		10	–	2	–	0
No. 9 Notre Dame		–		–		9	–	2	–	1
No. 18 Miami (FL)		–		–		9	–	3	–	0
Southern Miss		–		–		9	–	3	–	0
Navy		–		–		8	–	4	–	0
South Carolina		–		–		8	–	4	–	0
Virginia Tech		–		–		8	–	4	–	0
Boston College		–		–		7	–	4	–	0
Northeast Louisiana		–		–		7	–	4	–	0
Rutgers		–		–		7	–	4	–	0
UNLV		–		–		7	–	4	–	0
Tulane		–		–		7	–	5	–	0
Colgate		–		–		5	–	4	–	1
North Texas State		–		–		6	–	5	–	0
Villanova		–		–		6	–	5	–	0
West Virginia		–		–		6	–	6	–	0
Louisville		–		–		5	–	6	–	0
Richmond		–		–		5	–	6	–	0
Syracuse		–		–		5	–	6	–	0
East Carolina		–		–		4	–	7	–	0
Illinois State		–		–		4	–	7	–	0
Temple		–		–		4	–	7	–	0
Army		–		–		3	–	7	–	1
Holy Cross		–		–		3	–	8	–	0
Cincinnati		–		–		2	–	9	–	0
Memphis State		–		–		2	–	9	–	0
William & Mary		–		–		2	–	9	–	0
Georgia Tech		–		–		1	–	9	–	1
Rankings from AP Poll

The 1980 Virginia Tech Gobblers football team was an American football team that represented Virginia Tech as an independent during the 1980 NCAA Division I-A football season. In their third year under head coach Bill Dooley, the Gobblers compiled an overall record of 8–4 and lost to Miami (FL) at the Peach Bowl.

== Schedule ==
Date	Opponent	Site	TV	Result	Attendance	Source
September 6	at Wake Forest	Groves Stadium; Winston-Salem, NC	ABC	W 16–7	24,500	
September 13	East Tennessee State	Lane Stadium; Blacksburg, VA		W 35–7	27,500	
September 20	William & Mary	Lane Stadium; Blacksburg, VA		W 7–3	27,500	
September 27	James Madison	Lane Stadium; Blacksburg, VA		W 38–6	30,000	
October 4	at Clemson	Memorial Stadium; Clemson, SC		L 10–13	64,558	
October 11	Rhode Island^{†}	Lane Stadium; Blacksburg, VA		W 34–7	52,000	
October 18	Virginia	Lane Stadium; Blacksburg, VA (rivalry)		W 30–0	52,000	
October 25	at Richmond	City Stadium; Richmond, VA (Tobacco Bowl)		L 7–18	18,000	
November 1	West Virginia	Lane Stadium; Blacksburg, VA (rivalry)		W 34–11	45,200	
November 8	at No. 3 Florida State	Doak Campbell Stadium; Tallahassee, FL	ABC	L 7–31	51,487	
November 15	vs. VMI	Foreman Field; Norfolk, VA (Oyster Bowl, rivalry)		W 21–6	25,000	
January 2, 1981	vs. No. 20 Miami (FL)	Atlanta–Fulton County Stadium; Atlanta, GA (Peach Bowl, rivalry)	CBS	L 10–20	45,384	
^{†}Homecoming; Rankings from AP Poll released prior to the game

== Roster ==
The following players were members of the 1980 football team.

1980 Virginia Tech Hokies football team roster
Players
Coaches
Offense

Pos.	#	Name	Class
C	51	Lars Anderson	Sr
G	62	Jeff Bailey	Sr
WR		Dennis Behl	Sr
FB	4	Tony Blackmon	So
QB	14	Jeff Bolton	Sr
OT	72	Wally Browne	So
QB	7	Steve Casey	Jr
RB	36	Rusty Cook	Fr
C	55	John Cowne	Fr
WR	17	Jeff Dahl	Sr
FB	34	Scott Dovel	Jr
G	60	Lowell Eakin	Jr
RB	20	Johnnie Edmonds	So
G	77	George Evans	So
RB	43	John Fitzgerald	So
WR	25	Mike Giacolone	So
WR	31	Billy Hite	So
C	76	Greg Jacobsen	So
G	68	Phil Jamerson	Jr
TE	86	Joe Jones	Fr
RB	45	Cyrus Lawrence	So
WR	2	Tony McKee	So
OT	57	Bucky Methfessel	Jr
OT	53	Bubba Mullins	So
OT	75	Wayne Mutter	Jr
QB	18	Eddie Otey	So
RB	49	Tony Paige	Fr
TE	90	Rob Purdham
RB	6	Bill Renner	So
TE	44	Steve Scaggs
TE	87	Mike Shaw
G	61	Gary Smith
OT	63	Jim Smith
WR	40	Sidney Snell
C	50	Mark Udinski
G	56	Dave Uglow
G	78	Craig Van Schoick
C	59	Roe Waldron
OT	64	Steve Wirt

Defense

Pos.	#	Name	Class
DE	12	Bobby Allen	Jr
DL	58	Mike Borden	Sr
LB	46	Geoff Brown	So
DE	93	Robert Brown	Jr
DE	83	Cass Camp	Jr
DB	24	Mike Cannaday	Jr
DB	26	Jake Clarke	Fr
DB	1	Paul Davis	Sr
DB	29	Gillett Ford	So
DT	79	Hannon Fry	Jr
DB	48	Keener Fry	Sr
DE	41	John Gambone	Sr
DE	80	Mike Hill	So
DT	65	Robert Hill	Sr
LB	28	Pete Jackson	Jr
DT	91	Steve Jacobsen	Jr
LB	35	Mike Johnson	Fr
DT	52	Mike Kovac	Sr
DL	67	Thor Kritsky	So
LB	88	Ashley Lee	Fr
DB	23	John Ludlow	Jr
LB	39	Ron Luraschi	Jr
DL	98	David Marvel	Fr
DB	42	Carl McDonald	Sr
DE	11	Rick Miley	So
DB	47	Jerome Pannell
DT	94	Padro Phillips
DE	92	John Pryor
LB	37	James Robinson
DB	21	Mike Scharnus
DB	3	John Scott
DB	38	Donnie Simpson
LB	33	Lewis Stuart
DE	19	Jeremiah Thomas
DE		Stuart Thomas
LB	54	Andy Tommelleo
DB	27	Lawrence Young	Sr
DL	82	B. J. Zwinak	Fr

Special teams

Pos.	#	Name	Class
K	8	Eric King	Sr
K	9	Dennis Laury	So
P	30	Dave Smigelsky	Sr

Head coach

- Bill Dooley

Coordinators/assistant coaches

Legend

- (C) Team captain
- (S) Suspended
- (I) Ineligible
- Injured
- Redshirt
