= 1980 Bucknell Bison football team =

American college football season

1980 Bucknell Bison football
- Conference: Independent
- Record: 6–4
- Head coach: Bob Curtis (6th season)
- Captains: Joe Catalano; Dave Hibbard; Bruce Keltie
- Home stadium: Memorial Stadium

1980 NCAA Division I-AA independents football standings
	Conf.			Overall
Team	W	L	T	W		L		T
No. 1 Lehigh ^		–		9	–	1	–	2
No. 6 Delaware		–		9	–	2	–	0
Southeastern Louisiana		–		8	–	2	–	0
No. 8 Northwestern State		–		8	–	3	–	0
Portland State		–		8	–	3	–	0
Bucknell		–		6	–	4	–	0
James Madison		–		4	–	6	–	0
Lafayette		–		3	–	7	–	0
Nicholls State		–		2	–	9	–	0
Northeastern		–		2	–	9	–	0
^ – NCAA Division I-AA playoff participant; Rankings from Associated Press poll

The 1980 Bucknell Bison football team was an American football team that represented Bucknell University as an independent during the 1980 NCAA Division I-AA football season.

In their sixth year under head coach Bob Curtis, the Bison compiled a 6–4 record. Joe Catalano, Dave Hibbard and Bruce Keltie were the team captains.

Bucknell played its home games at Memorial Stadium on the university campus in Lewisburg, Pennsylvania.

== Schedule ==
Date	Opponent	Site	Result	Attendance	Source
September 13	at Connecticut	Memorial Stadium; Storrs, CT	L 7–38	7,670	
September 20	Slippery Rock	Memorial Stadium; Lewisburg, PA	W 25–6		
September 27	at Brown	Brown Stadium; Providence, RI	W 28–20	7,000	
October 4	at Davidson	Richardson Stadium; Davidson, NC	L 13–21	4,300	
October 11	Lafayette^{†}	Memorial Stadium; Lewisburg, PA	W 14–0		
October 18	West Chester^	Memorial Stadium; Lewisburg, PA	W 31–21		
October 25	at No. 3 Lehigh	Taylor Stadium; Bethlehem, PA	L 0–13	5,000	
November 1	Cornell	Memorial Stadium; Lewisburg, PA	W 33–16	2,500	
November 8	Colgate	Memorial Stadium; Lewisburg, PA	L 14–17	2,500	
November 15	No. 4 Boston University	Memorial Stadium; Lewisburg, PA	W 30–17	2,200	
^{†}Homecoming; ^ Parents Weekend; Rankings from Associated Press Poll released prior to the game
