= 1980 Northeast Louisiana Indians football team =

American college football season

1980 Northeast Louisiana Indians football
- Conference: Independent
- Record: 7–4
- Head coach: John David Crow (5th season)
- Home stadium: Malone Stadium

1980 NCAA Division I-A independents football records
	Conf.					Overall
Team	W		L		T	W		L		T
No. 2 Pittsburgh		–		–		11	–	1	–	0
Tennessee State		–		–		9	–	1	–	0
No. 5 Florida State		–		–		10	–	2	–	0
No. 8 Penn State		–		–		10	–	2	–	0
No. 9 Notre Dame		–		–		9	–	2	–	1
No. 18 Miami (FL)		–		–		9	–	3	–	0
Southern Miss		–		–		9	–	3	–	0
Navy		–		–		8	–	4	–	0
South Carolina		–		–		8	–	4	–	0
Virginia Tech		–		–		8	–	4	–	0
Boston College		–		–		7	–	4	–	0
Northeast Louisiana		–		–		7	–	4	–	0
Rutgers		–		–		7	–	4	–	0
UNLV		–		–		7	–	4	–	0
Tulane		–		–		7	–	5	–	0
Colgate		–		–		5	–	4	–	1
North Texas State		–		–		6	–	5	–	0
Villanova		–		–		6	–	5	–	0
West Virginia		–		–		6	–	6	–	0
Louisville		–		–		5	–	6	–	0
Richmond		–		–		5	–	6	–	0
Syracuse		–		–		5	–	6	–	0
East Carolina		–		–		4	–	7	–	0
Illinois State		–		–		4	–	7	–	0
Temple		–		–		4	–	7	–	0
Army		–		–		3	–	7	–	1
Holy Cross		–		–		3	–	8	–	0
Cincinnati		–		–		2	–	9	–	0
Memphis State		–		–		2	–	9	–	0
William & Mary		–		–		2	–	9	–	0
Georgia Tech		–		–		1	–	9	–	1
Rankings from AP Poll

The 1980 Northeast Louisiana Indians football team was an American football team that represented Northeast Louisiana University (now known as the University of Louisiana at Monroe) as an independent during the 1980 NCAA Division I-A football season. In their fifth year under head coach John David Crow, the team compiled a 7–4 record.

== Schedule ==
Date	Opponent	Site	Result	Attendance	Source
September 13	at Iowa State	Cyclone Stadium; Ames, IA	L 7–42	47,331	
September 20	at Arkansas State	Indian Stadium; Jonesboro, AR	W 35–12		
September 27	Southwestern Louisiana	Malone Stadium; Monroe, LA	W 24–0	16,583	
October 4	Northwestern State	Malone Stadium; Monroe, LA (rivalry)	W 38–14	16,971	
October 11	McNeese State	Malone Stadium; Monroe, LA	L 28–48	16,352	
October 18	at Lamar	Cardinal Stadium; Beaumont, TX	W 28–6	500	
October 25	Southeastern Louisiana	Malone Stadium; Monroe, LA	L 30–55	17,203	
November 1	at Nicholls State	John L. Guidry Stadium; Thibodaux, LA	W 29–28		
November 8	Mississippi College	Malone Stadium; Monroe, LA	W 40–22		
November 15	at North Texas State	Fouts Field; Denton, TX	L 18–26		
November 22	Louisiana Tech	Malone Stadium; Monroe, LA (rivalry)	W 19–14	15,238	
