= 1980 Georgia Tech Yellow Jackets football team =

American college football season

1980 Georgia Tech Yellow Jackets football
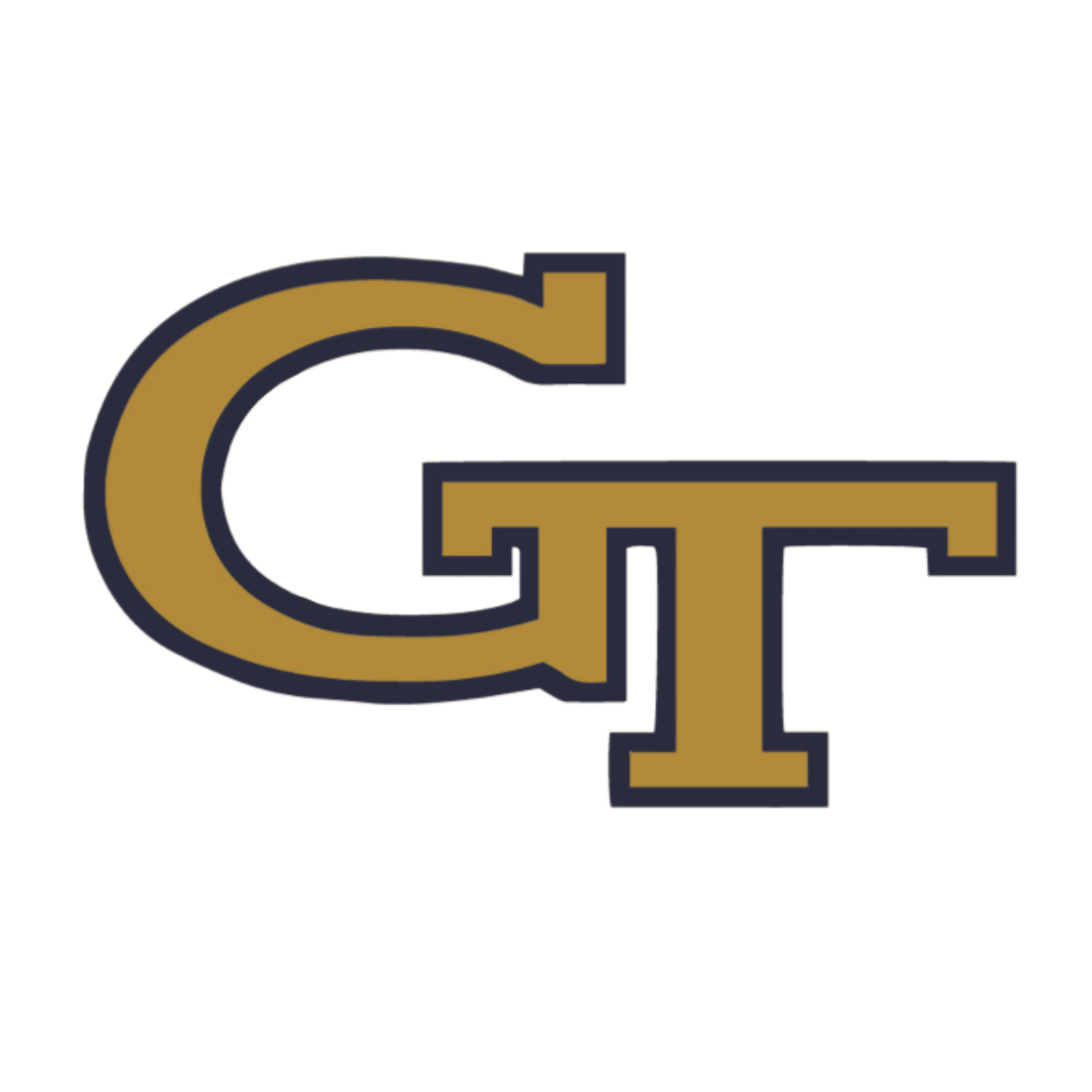
- Conference: Independent
- Record: 1–9–1
- Head coach: Bill Curry (1st season)
- Offensive coordinator: Larry Travis (3rd season)
- Defensive coordinator: Ken Blair (1st season)
- Captains: Ben Utt; Duane Wood; Ken Taylor; Darrell Thomas
- Home stadium: Grant Field

1980 NCAA Division I-A independents football records
	Conf.					Overall
Team	W		L		T	W		L		T
No. 2 Pittsburgh		–		–		11	–	1	–	0
Tennessee State		–		–		9	–	1	–	0
No. 5 Florida State		–		–		10	–	2	–	0
No. 8 Penn State		–		–		10	–	2	–	0
No. 9 Notre Dame		–		–		9	–	2	–	1
No. 18 Miami (FL)		–		–		9	–	3	–	0
Southern Miss		–		–		9	–	3	–	0
Navy		–		–		8	–	4	–	0
South Carolina		–		–		8	–	4	–	0
Virginia Tech		–		–		8	–	4	–	0
Boston College		–		–		7	–	4	–	0
Northeast Louisiana		–		–		7	–	4	–	0
Rutgers		–		–		7	–	4	–	0
UNLV		–		–		7	–	4	–	0
Tulane		–		–		7	–	5	–	0
Colgate		–		–		5	–	4	–	1
North Texas State		–		–		6	–	5	–	0
Villanova		–		–		6	–	5	–	0
West Virginia		–		–		6	–	6	–	0
Louisville		–		–		5	–	6	–	0
Richmond		–		–		5	–	6	–	0
Syracuse		–		–		5	–	6	–	0
East Carolina		–		–		4	–	7	–	0
Illinois State		–		–		4	–	7	–	0
Temple		–		–		4	–	7	–	0
Army		–		–		3	–	7	–	1
Holy Cross		–		–		3	–	8	–	0
Cincinnati		–		–		2	–	9	–	0
Memphis State		–		–		2	–	9	–	0
William & Mary		–		–		2	–	9	–	0
Georgia Tech		–		–		1	–	9	–	1
Rankings from AP Poll

The 1980 Georgia Tech Yellow Jackets football team represented the Georgia Institute of Technology as an independent during the 1980 NCAA Division I-A football season. The Yellow Jackets were led by first-year head coach Bill Curry, and played their home games at Grant Field in Atlanta. Georgia Tech struggled mightily under Curry, finishing with one of the worst records in Georgia Tech history with 1 win, 9 losses, and 1 tie. A major highlight was achieved, however, when the Yellow Jackets produced a 3–3 tie against the number one team in the country, the undefeated Notre Dame Fighting Irish.

== Schedule ==
Date	Opponent	Site	Result	Attendance	Source
September 6	at No. 2 Alabama	Legion Field; Birmingham, AL (rivalry)	L 3–26	78,410	
September 20	Florida	Grant Field; Atlanta, GA	L 12–45	35,165	
September 27	Memphis State	Grant Field; Atlanta, GA	W 17–8	28,062	
October 4	at No. 10 North Carolina	Kenan Memorial Stadium; Chapel Hill, NC	L 0–33	49,750	
October 11	Tennessee	Grant Field; Atlanta, GA (rivalry)	L 10–23	50,127	
October 18	at Auburn	Jordan-Hare Stadium; Auburn, AL (rivalry)	L 14–17	57,950	
October 25	Tulane^{†}	Grant Field; Atlanta, GA	L 14–31	35,119	
November 1	at Duke	Wallace Wade Stadium; Durham, NC	L 12–17	18,200	
November 8	No. 1 Notre Dame	Grant Field; Atlanta, GA (rivalry)	T 3–3	41,226	
November 15	Navy	Grant Field; Atlanta, GA	L 8–19	17,631	
November 29	at No. 1 Georgia	Sanford Stadium; Athens, GA (Clean, Old-Fashioned Hate)	L 20–38	62,800	
^{†}Homecoming; Rankings from AP Poll released prior to the game

== Roster ==
1980 Georgia Tech Yellow Jackets football team roster
Players
Coaches
Offense

Pos.	#	Name	Class
RB	29	David Allen	Jr
WR	80	Leon Chadwick	Sr
RB	26	Ronny Cone	So
TE	85	Glenn Etheridge	So
G	76	Ellis Gardner	So
WR	83	Marlon Heggs	Sr
OL	62	Ken Howell
QB	2	Mike Kelley	Jr
WR	82	Kris Kentera	Jr
OT	78	Dave Lutz	So
QB	18	Ted Peeples	Sr
C	60	Mark Schultz	So
G	64	Ben Utt (C)	Sr
QB, TE	9	Ken Whisenhunt	Fr
FB	46	Dan Wood	Sr

Defense

Pos.	#	Name	Class
DL	92	Mark Bradley	Jr
DE	74	Marvin Dyett	So
LB	95	Sheldon Fox	Sr
LB	56	Robert Jaracz	Fr
S	24	Lawrence Lowe	Sr
LB	54	Steve Mooney
DE	96	Rick Olive	Sr
DB		Mark Sheffield
LB	43	Lance Skelton	Jr
DB	28	Ken Taylor (C)	Sr
DB	41	Ted Thurson	So
DL		Lynwood Volley
LB	49	Duane Wood	So

Special teams

Pos.	#	Name	Class
P	8	Jeff Pierce	Sr
K		Johnny Smith

Head coach

- Bill Curry

Coordinators/assistant coaches

- Larry Travis – Offensive coordinator/offensive line
- Rip Scherer – Quarterbacks
- Jeff McLean – Running backs
- Terry Tuley – Running backs
- Mac McWhorter – Wide receivers
- Brad Roper – Tight ends
- Mark Hunter – Offensive line
- Ken Blair – Defensive coordinator
- Romeo Crennel – Defensive line
- Mike Dean – Defensive backs
- John Fabris – Defensive assistant

Legend

- (C) Team captain
- (S) Suspended
- (I) Ineligible
- Injured
- Redshirt
