= 1980 Tulane Green Wave football team =

American college football season

1980 Tulane Green Wave football

Hall of Fame Classic, L 15–34 vs. Arkansas
- Conference: Independent
- Record: 7–5
- Head coach: Vince Gibson (1st season)
- Home stadium: Louisiana Superdome

1980 NCAA Division I-A independents football records
	Conf.					Overall
Team	W		L		T	W		L		T
No. 2 Pittsburgh		–		–		11	–	1	–	0
Tennessee State		–		–		9	–	1	–	0
No. 5 Florida State		–		–		10	–	2	–	0
No. 8 Penn State		–		–		10	–	2	–	0
No. 9 Notre Dame		–		–		9	–	2	–	1
No. 18 Miami (FL)		–		–		9	–	3	–	0
Southern Miss		–		–		9	–	3	–	0
Navy		–		–		8	–	4	–	0
South Carolina		–		–		8	–	4	–	0
Virginia Tech		–		–		8	–	4	–	0
Boston College		–		–		7	–	4	–	0
Northeast Louisiana		–		–		7	–	4	–	0
Rutgers		–		–		7	–	4	–	0
UNLV		–		–		7	–	4	–	0
Tulane		–		–		7	–	5	–	0
Colgate		–		–		5	–	4	–	1
North Texas State		–		–		6	–	5	–	0
Villanova		–		–		6	–	5	–	0
West Virginia		–		–		6	–	6	–	0
Louisville		–		–		5	–	6	–	0
Richmond		–		–		5	–	6	–	0
Syracuse		–		–		5	–	6	–	0
East Carolina		–		–		4	–	7	–	0
Illinois State		–		–		4	–	7	–	0
Temple		–		–		4	–	7	–	0
Army		–		–		3	–	7	–	1
Holy Cross		–		–		3	–	8	–	0
Cincinnati		–		–		2	–	9	–	0
Memphis State		–		–		2	–	9	–	0
William & Mary		–		–		2	–	9	–	0
Georgia Tech		–		–		1	–	9	–	1
Rankings from AP Poll

The 1980 Tulane Green Wave football team represented Tulane University as an independent during the 1980 NCAA Division I-A football season. The team was led by first-year coach Vince Gibson. The Green Wave played home games in the Louisiana Superdome and finished with a 7–5 record, losing to Arkansas 15–34 in the Hall of Fame Classic. In the 78th edition of the Battle for the Flag, Tulane lost 7–24 to LSU. Throughout the season the offense scored 279 points, while the defense allowed 243 points. Two members of the Green Wave team were drafted into the National Football League (NFL).

== Schedule ==
Date	Opponent	Site	Result	Attendance	Source
September 6	Southern Miss	Louisiana Superdome; New Orleans, LA (rivalry)	L 14–17	44,698	
September 13	at No. 13 Stanford	Stanford Stadium; Stanford, CA	L 14–19	54,829	
September 20	Rice	Louisiana Superdome; New Orleans, LA	W 35–14	40,321	
September 27	at Ole Miss	Hemingway Stadium; Oxford, MS (rivalry)	W 26–24	37,419	
October 4	SMU	Louisiana Superdome; New Orleans, LA	L 21–31	42,563	
October 11	at Vanderbilt	Dudley Field; Nashville, TN	W 43–21	35,960	
October 18	Air Force	Louisiana Superdome; New Orleans, LA	W 28–7	28,101	
October 25	at Georgia Tech	Grant Field; Atlanta, GA	W 31–14	35,119	
November 1	Kentucky	Louisiana Superdome; New Orleans, LA	W 24–22	42,139	
November 15	Memphis State	Louisiana Superdome; New Orleans, LA	W 21–16	33,184	
November 22	at LSU	Tiger Stadium; Baton Rouge, LA (Battle for the Rag)	L 7–24	69,248	
December 27	vs. Arkansas	Legion Field; Birmingham, AL (Hall of Fame Classic)	L 15–34	29,000	
Rankings from AP Poll released prior to the game; Source:

== Roster ==
1980 Tulane Green Wave football team roster
Players
Coaches
Offense

Pos.	#	Name	Class
QB	9	Paul Catanese	Jr
QB	12	Nickie Hall	Sr
TE	87	Rodney Holman	Jr

Defense

Pos.	#	Name	Class
LB	97	Marty Wetzel	Sr

Special teams

Pos.	#	Name	Class

Head coach

- Vince Gibson

Coordinators/assistant coaches

Legend

- (C) Team captain
- (S) Suspended
- (I) Ineligible
- Injured
- Redshirt

== Team players in the NFL ==
Player	Position	Round	Pick	NFL team
Marty Wetzel	Linebacker	10	251	New York Jets
Nickie Hall	Quarterback	10	255	Green Bay Packers
