= 1980 Villanova Wildcats football team =

American college football season

1979 Villanova Wildcats football
- Conference: Independent
- Record: 6–5
- Head coach: Dick Bedesem (6th season)
- Captains: Joe Arcidiacono; Dan Burke
- Home stadium: Villanova Stadium

1980 NCAA Division I-A independents football records
	Conf.					Overall
Team	W		L		T	W		L		T
No. 2 Pittsburgh		–		–		11	–	1	–	0
Tennessee State		–		–		9	–	1	–	0
No. 5 Florida State		–		–		10	–	2	–	0
No. 8 Penn State		–		–		10	–	2	–	0
No. 9 Notre Dame		–		–		9	–	2	–	1
No. 18 Miami (FL)		–		–		9	–	3	–	0
Southern Miss		–		–		9	–	3	–	0
Navy		–		–		8	–	4	–	0
South Carolina		–		–		8	–	4	–	0
Virginia Tech		–		–		8	–	4	–	0
Boston College		–		–		7	–	4	–	0
Northeast Louisiana		–		–		7	–	4	–	0
Rutgers		–		–		7	–	4	–	0
UNLV		–		–		7	–	4	–	0
Tulane		–		–		7	–	5	–	0
Colgate		–		–		5	–	4	–	1
North Texas State		–		–		6	–	5	–	0
Villanova		–		–		6	–	5	–	0
West Virginia		–		–		6	–	6	–	0
Louisville		–		–		5	–	6	–	0
Richmond		–		–		5	–	6	–	0
Syracuse		–		–		5	–	6	–	0
East Carolina		–		–		4	–	7	–	0
Illinois State		–		–		4	–	7	–	0
Temple		–		–		4	–	7	–	0
Army		–		–		3	–	7	–	1
Holy Cross		–		–		3	–	8	–	0
Cincinnati		–		–		2	–	9	–	0
Memphis State		–		–		2	–	9	–	0
William & Mary		–		–		2	–	9	–	0
Georgia Tech		–		–		1	–	9	–	1
Rankings from AP Poll

The 1980 Villanova Wildcats football team represented the Villanova University as an independent during the 1980 NCAA Division I-A football season. The head coach was Dick Bedesem, coaching his sixth season with the Wildcats. The team played their home games at Villanova Stadium in Villanova, Pennsylvania. Future NFL Hall of Famer Howie Long was a senior nose guard on the team. In April 1981 the Villanova University Board of Trustees announced the discontinuation of football effective immediately. The decision was highly controversial and triggered efforts resulting in the restoration of football at the Division I-AA level in 1985.

== Schedule ==
Date	Opponent	Site	Result	Attendance	Source
September 6	at Maryland	Byrd Stadium; College Park, MD	L 20–24	32,650	
September 13	Richmond	Villanova Stadium; Villanova, PA	L 7–21		
September 20	at UMass	Alumni Stadium; Amherst, MA	L 12–24	11,494	
September 27	Boston College	Villanova Stadium; Villanova, PA	W 20–9	13,300	
October 11	Cincinnati	Villanova Stadium; Villanova, PA	W 23–6	13,400	
October 18	at Navy	Navy–Marine Corps Memorial Stadium; Annapolis, MD	L 15–24	21,616	
October 25	at VMI	Alumni Memorial Field; Lexington, VA	W 17–6	3,200	
November 1	at Delaware	Delaware Stadium; Newark, DE (rivalry)	L 7–17	22,680	
November 8	at Penn	Franklin Field; Philadelphia, PA	W 34–3	15,454	
November 15	at Holy Cross	Fitton Field; Worcester, MA	W 45–13	5,135	
November 22	Temple	Villanova Stadium; Villanova, PA (Mayor's Cup)	W 23–7	10,800	

== Roster ==
1980 Villanova Wildcats football team roster
Players
Coaches
Offense

Pos.	#	Name	Class
RB	31	Greg Bedesem	Sr
RB	2	John Cason	Fr
WR		Amos Coleman
RB	22	Bill Conners	Sr
RB		Milt Corsey
RB		Craig Dunn
QB	15	Dan Greene	So
RB	20	Mike Gold	Sr
QB	16	Kevin Ingram	Fr
RB		Mike Keppick
TE		Deron Miller
C, OT	53	Skip Massengill	Sr
QB	12	Pat O'Brien	Sr
RB		Shawn Passman
WR	44	Tim Robinson	So
TE		John Savini
WR	80	Ed Sullivan
WR	21	Willie Sydnor	Jr
RB		Anthony Tracchio
G	73	Doug Walker	So
RB	43	Don Ziesel	Sr

Defense

Pos.	#	Name	Class
DB	11	Tom Anthony	Jr
LB	58	Anthony Griggs	Jr
DE	82	Tom Jensen	Sr
DE	81	Tim Kane	Sr
DB	45	Glen LeGrande	Fr
DB	39	Tom Leonard	So
DT	55	Howie Long	Sr
DT	62	Joe Makoid	Sr
DB	49	David Martin	Sr
LB	59	Jim Matika	Jr
DT	79	Rimas Melnikas	Sr
S	48	Chris Yurkow	So

Special teams

Pos.	#	Name	Class
K	17	Chuck Bushbeck	Jr
P	4	Joe Borajkiewicz	Jr

Head coach

- Dick Bedesem

Coordinators/assistant coaches

Legend

- (C) Team captain
- (S) Suspended
- (I) Ineligible
- Injured
- Redshirt
