= 1980 Navy Midshipmen football team =

American college football season

1980 Navy Midshipmen football

Garden State Bowl, L 0–35 vs. Houston
- Conference: Independent
- Record: 8–4
- Head coach: George Welsh (8th season)
- Captains: Terry Huxel; Frank McCallister
- Home stadium: Navy–Marine Corps Memorial Stadium

1980 NCAA Division I-A independents football records
	Conf.					Overall
Team	W		L		T	W		L		T
No. 2 Pittsburgh		–		–		11	–	1	–	0
Tennessee State		–		–		9	–	1	–	0
No. 5 Florida State		–		–		10	–	2	–	0
No. 8 Penn State		–		–		10	–	2	–	0
No. 9 Notre Dame		–		–		9	–	2	–	1
No. 18 Miami (FL)		–		–		9	–	3	–	0
Southern Miss		–		–		9	–	3	–	0
Navy		–		–		8	–	4	–	0
South Carolina		–		–		8	–	4	–	0
Virginia Tech		–		–		8	–	4	–	0
Boston College		–		–		7	–	4	–	0
Northeast Louisiana		–		–		7	–	4	–	0
Rutgers		–		–		7	–	4	–	0
UNLV		–		–		7	–	4	–	0
Tulane		–		–		7	–	5	–	0
Colgate		–		–		5	–	4	–	1
North Texas State		–		–		6	–	5	–	0
Villanova		–		–		6	–	5	–	0
West Virginia		–		–		6	–	6	–	0
Louisville		–		–		5	–	6	–	0
Richmond		–		–		5	–	6	–	0
Syracuse		–		–		5	–	6	–	0
East Carolina		–		–		4	–	7	–	0
Illinois State		–		–		4	–	7	–	0
Temple		–		–		4	–	7	–	0
Army		–		–		3	–	7	–	1
Holy Cross		–		–		3	–	8	–	0
Cincinnati		–		–		2	–	9	–	0
Memphis State		–		–		2	–	9	–	0
William & Mary		–		–		2	–	9	–	0
Georgia Tech		–		–		1	–	9	–	1
Rankings from AP Poll

The 1980 Navy Midshipmen football team represented the United States Naval Academy (USNA) as an independent during the 1980 NCAA Division I-A football season. The team was led by eighth-year head coach George Welsh.

== Schedule ==
Date	Time	Opponent	Site	TV	Result	Attendance	Source
September 13		at Virginia	Scott Stadium; Charlottesville, VA		L 3–6	35,174	
September 20		Kent State	Navy–Marine Corps Memorial Stadium; Annapolis, MD		W 31–3	16,203	
September 27		William & Mary	Navy–Marine Corps Memorial Stadium; Annapolis, MD		W 45–6	18,215	
October 4		Boston College^{†}	Navy–Marine Corps Memorial Stadium; Annapolis, MD		W 21–0	27,405	
October 11		at Air Force	Falcon Stadium; Colorado Springs, CO (Commander-in-Chief's Trophy)		L 20–21	27,754	
October 18		Villanova	Navy–Marine Corps Memorial Stadium; Annapolis, MD		W 24–15	21,616	
October 25		at No. 18 Washington	Husky Stadium; Seattle, WA	ABC	W 24–10	48,841	
November 1	1:30 p.m.	vs. No. 3 Notre Dame	Giants Stadium; East Rutherford, NJ (rivalry)		L 0–33	76,891	
November 8		at Syracuse	Carrier Dome; Syracuse, NY		W 6–3	50,350	
November 15		at Georgia Tech	Grant Field; Atlanta, GA		W 19–8	17,631	
November 29	3:45 p.m.	vs. Army	Veterans Stadium; Philadelphia, PA (Army–Navy Game)	ABC	W 33–6	70,338	
December 14		vs. Houston	Giants Stadium; East Rutherford, NJ (Garden State Bowl)	Mizlou	L 0–35	41,417	
^{†}Homecoming; Rankings from AP Poll released prior to the game; All times are in Eastern time

== Game summaries ==
=== Army ===
Army Cadets vs. Navy Midshipmen

Quarter	1	2	3	4	Total
Army	0	7	6	0	13
Navy	10	10	10	3	33

at Veterans Stadium • Philadelphia, Pennsylvania

- TV announcers (ABC): Keith Jackson and Ara Parseghian

Game information

Army

Navy

- Fred Reitzel 138 Pass Yds
- Eddie Meyers 144 Rush Yds

== Roster ==
1980 Navy Midshipmen football team roster
Players
Coaches
Offense

Pos.	#	Name	Class
OT	74	Keith Boring	Jr
RB	22	Steve Callahan	Sr
WR	86	Dave Dent	Sr
C	75	Mike Dolan	Sr
TE	83	Mark Fitzgerald	Jr
RB	25	Duane Flowers	Jr
TE	87	Curt Gainer	Sr
G	77	Steve Hooper	Jr
RB	49	Tim Jackson	Jr
QB	16	Jeff Korn	So
G	71	Frank McCallister	Sr
TE	85	Matt McLaughlin	Sr
FB	40	Eddie Meyers	Jr
WR	89	Troy Mitchell	So
TE	82	Greg Papajohn	Jr
QB	26	Fred Reitzel	Sr
RB	23	Mike Sherlock	Sr
RB	38	Andy Skehan	So
QB	17	Tom Tarquinio	So
G	57	Bob Teufel	Sr
FB	30	Kevin Tolbert	Sr
OT	79	Rick Welch	Sr
WR	88	Chris Yelder	Jr

Defense

Pos.	#	Name	Class
DB	34	Chris Boblett	Sr
DT	73	Steve Chambers	Sr
DB	19	Ray Daly	Fr
LB	69	Ted Dumbauld	Sr
DL	36	Ken Fancher	So
LB	55	Tom Fitzpatrick	Jr
DB	41	John Foley	Jr
DL	78	Chris Garner
DT	64	Cliff Hagan
DL	54	Terry Huxel	Sr
DL	56	Tim Jordan	Jr
LB	63	Mike Kronzer	Sr
DL	53	Mike Matthes	Sr
LB	50	Ken Olson	Jr
DB	47	Elliot Reagans	Jr
DB	31	Jon Ross	Jr
DE	84	Mike Rouser	Jr
DB	14	Jeff Shoemake	So
DT	67	Paul Soares	So
DL	48	Travis Wallington	So
DB	21	Ted Wirginis	Sr

Special teams

Pos.	#	Name	Class
K	24	Steve Fehr	Sr
P	81	Lex Lauletta	Sr

Head coach

- George Welsh

Coordinators/assistant coaches

Legend

- (C) Team captain
- (S) Suspended
- (I) Ineligible
- Injured
- Redshirt
