= 1980 Boston University Terriers football team =

American college football season

1980 Boston University Terriers football

Yankee Conference champion
- Conference: Yankee Conference

Ranking
- AP: No. 9
- Record: 9–2 (5–0 Yankee)
- Head coach: Rick Taylor (4th season)
- Defensive coordinator: Ed Sweeney (3rd season)
- Home stadium: Nickerson Field

1980 Yankee Conference football standings
	Conf.					Overall
Team	W		L		T	W		L		T
No. 9 Boston University $	5	–	0	–	0	9	–	2	–	0
No. T–10 UMass	4	–	1	–	0	7	–	3	–	0
No. T–10 Connecticut	3	–	2	–	0	7	–	3	–	0
New Hampshire	2	–	3	–	0	6	–	4	–	0
Maine	1	–	4	–	0	4	–	7	–	0
Rhode Island	0	–	5	–	0	2	–	9	–	0
$ – Conference champion; Rankings from Associated Press poll

The 1980 Boston University Terriers football team was an American football team that represented Boston University as a member of the Yankee Conference during the 1980 NCAA Division I-AA football season. In their fourth season under head coach Rick Taylor, the Terriers compiled a 9–2 record (5–0 against conference opponents), won the Yankee Conference championship, and outscored opponents by a total of 272 to 184.

Tackle Paul Farren started a pair of games in 1980. He later played 10 years for the Cleveland Browns.

The team played its home games at Nickerson Field in Boston.

== Schedule ==
Date	Opponent	Rank	Site	Result	Attendance	Source
September 13	Merchant Marine*		Nickerson Field; Boston, MA	W 42–0		
September 20	at New Hampshire		Cowell Stadium; Durham, NH	W 27–9	5,500	
September 27	Maine	No. 7	Nickerson Field; Boston, MA	W 17–0		
October 4	at Temple*	No. T–4	Veterans Stadium; Philadelphia, PA	L 6–53	10,375	
October 11	Davidson*		Nickerson Field; Boston, MA	W 35–14	2,440	
October 18	at Rhode Island	No. T–10	Meade Stadium; Kingston, RI	W 24–13		
October 25	No. 9 UMass	No. 8	Nickerson Field; Boston, MA	W 3–0		
November 1	VMI*	No. T–7	Nickerson Field; Boston, MA	W 38–22	3,000	
November 8	at No. T–10 Connecticut	No. 4	Memorial Stadium; Storrs, CT	W 28–24		
November 15	at Bucknell*	No. 4	Memorial Stadium; Lewisburg, PA	L 17–30	2,200	
November 22	Northeastern*	No. T–7	Nickerson Field; Boston, MA	W 35–19	3,212	
*Non-conference game; Rankings from Associated Press Poll released prior to the game
