= 1980 Southern Miss Golden Eagles football team =

American college football season

1980 Southern Miss Golden Eagles football

Independence Bowl champion

Independence Bowl, W 16–14 vs. McNeese State
- Conference: Independent
- Record: 9–3
- Head coach: Bobby Collins (6th season)
- Home stadium: M. M. Roberts Stadium

1980 NCAA Division I-A independents football records
	Conf.					Overall
Team	W		L		T	W		L		T
No. 2 Pittsburgh		–		–		11	–	1	–	0
Tennessee State		–		–		9	–	1	–	0
No. 5 Florida State		–		–		10	–	2	–	0
No. 8 Penn State		–		–		10	–	2	–	0
No. 9 Notre Dame		–		–		9	–	2	–	1
No. 18 Miami (FL)		–		–		9	–	3	–	0
Southern Miss		–		–		9	–	3	–	0
Navy		–		–		8	–	4	–	0
South Carolina		–		–		8	–	4	–	0
Virginia Tech		–		–		8	–	4	–	0
Boston College		–		–		7	–	4	–	0
Northeast Louisiana		–		–		7	–	4	–	0
Rutgers		–		–		7	–	4	–	0
UNLV		–		–		7	–	4	–	0
Tulane		–		–		7	–	5	–	0
Colgate		–		–		5	–	4	–	1
North Texas State		–		–		6	–	5	–	0
Villanova		–		–		6	–	5	–	0
West Virginia		–		–		6	–	6	–	0
Louisville		–		–		5	–	6	–	0
Richmond		–		–		5	–	6	–	0
Syracuse		–		–		5	–	6	–	0
East Carolina		–		–		4	–	7	–	0
Illinois State		–		–		4	–	7	–	0
Temple		–		–		4	–	7	–	0
Army		–		–		3	–	7	–	1
Holy Cross		–		–		3	–	8	–	0
Cincinnati		–		–		2	–	9	–	0
Memphis State		–		–		2	–	9	–	0
William & Mary		–		–		2	–	9	–	0
Georgia Tech		–		–		1	–	9	–	1
Rankings from AP Poll

The 1980 Southern Miss Golden Eagles football team was an American football team that represented the University of Southern Mississippi as an independent during the 1980 NCAA Division I-A football season. In their sixth year under head coach Bobby Collins, the team compiled a 9–3 record.

== Schedule ==
Date	Opponent	Rank	Site	TV	Result	Attendance	Source
September 6	at Tulane		Louisiana Superdome; New Orleans, LA (rivalry)		W 17–14	44,698	
September 20	Louisiana Tech		M. M. Roberts Stadium; Hattiesburg, MS (rivalry)		W 38–11	24,640	
September 27	at East Carolina		Ficklen Memorial Stadium; Greenville, NC	WITN	W 35–7	20,037	
October 4	vs. Ole Miss		Mississippi Veterans Memorial Stadium; Jackson, MS		W 28–22	47,211	
October 11	at Mississippi State		Scott Field; Starkville, MS		W 42–14	36,211	
October 18	Arkansas State		M. M. Roberts Stadium; Hattiesburg, MS		W 35–0	21,915	
October 25	No. 1 Alabama	No. 20	Bryant–Denny Stadium; Tuscaloosa, AL		L 7–42	60,210	
November 1	Lamar^{†}		M. M. Roberts Stadium; Hattiesburg, MS		W 36–10	30,485	
November 8	Auburn		Jordan–Hare Stadium; Auburn, AL		L 0–31	56,800	
November 15	Richmond		M. M. Roberts Stadium; Hattiesburg, MS		W 33–12	17,320	
November 22	Louisville		M. M. Roberts Stadium; Hattiesburg, MS		L 3–6	21,210	
December 13	McNeese State		Independence Stadium; Shreveport, LA (Independence Bowl)		W 16–14	42,600	
^{†}Homecoming; Rankings from AP Poll released prior to the game

== Roster ==
1980 Southern Miss Golden Eagles football team roster
Players
Coaches
Offense

Pos.	#	Name	Class
QB	10	Reggie Collier	So
TE	80	Marvin Harvey	Sr
RB	45	Sammy Winder	Jr

Defense

Pos.	#	Name	Class
CB	19	Hanford Dixon	Sr
LB	47	Cliff Lewis	Sr

Special teams

Pos.	#	Name	Class

Head coach

- Bobby Collins

Coordinators/assistant coaches

Legend

- (C) Team captain
- (S) Suspended
- (I) Ineligible
- Injured
- Redshirt
