= 1980 New Hampshire Wildcats football team =

American college football season

1980 New Hampshire Wildcats football
- Conference: Yankee Conference
- Record: 6–4 (2–3 Yankee)
- Head coach: Bill Bowes (9th season)
- Home stadium: Cowell Stadium

1980 Yankee Conference football standings
	Conf.					Overall
Team	W		L		T	W		L		T
No. 9 Boston University $	5	–	0	–	0	9	–	2	–	0
No. T–10 UMass	4	–	1	–	0	7	–	3	–	0
No. T–10 Connecticut	3	–	2	–	0	7	–	3	–	0
New Hampshire	2	–	3	–	0	6	–	4	–	0
Maine	1	–	4	–	0	4	–	7	–	0
Rhode Island	0	–	5	–	0	2	–	9	–	0
$ – Conference champion; Rankings from Associated Press poll

The 1980 New Hampshire Wildcats football team was an American football team that represented the University of New Hampshire as a member of the Yankee Conference during the 1980 NCAA Division I-AA football season. In its ninth year under head coach Bill Bowes, the team compiled a 6–4 record (2–3 against conference opponents) and finished fourth out of six teams in the Yankee Conference.

== Schedule ==
Date	Opponent	Rank	Site	Result	Attendance	Source
September 6	Connecticut		Cowell Stadium; Durham, NH	L 10–20		
September 13	Wayne State (MI)*		Cowell Stadium; Durham, NH	L 7–17		
September 20	Boston University		Cowell Stadium; Durham, NH	L 9–27	5,500	
September 27	at Dartmouth*		Memorial Field; Hanover, NH (rivalry)	W 24–7	11,027	
October 11	Maine		Cowell Stadium; Durham, NH (rivalry)	W 19–13		
October 18	at Towson State*		Towson Stadium; Towson, MD	W 10–6		
October 25	at Northeastern*		Parsons Field; Brookline, MA	W 48–12	1,600	
November 1	Rhode Island		Cowell Stadium; Durham, NH	W 31–28	2,000	
November 8	Lafayette*		Cowell Stadium; Durham, NH	W 26–6	7,121	
November 15	at No. 9 UMass	No. T–10	Alumni Stadium; Hadley, MA (rivalry)	L 0–17	9,206	
*Non-conference game; Rankings from AP Poll released prior to the game

== Roster ==
1980 New Hampshire Wildcats football team roster
Players			Coaches
Offense: Pos. / # / Name / Class; OT / 72 / Ken Kaplan / Jr	Defense: Pos. / # / Name / Class; LB / 58 / Steve Doig / Jr	Special teams: Pos. / # / Name / Class	Head coach: Bill Bowes; Coordinators/assistant coaches Legend: (C) Team captain; (S) Suspended; (I) Ineligible; Injured; Redshirt
