= 1980 Northwestern State Demons football team =

American college football season

1980 Northwestern State Demons football
- Conference: Independent
- Record: 8–3
- Head coach: A. L. Williams (6th season)
- Home stadium: Harry Turpin Stadium

1980 NCAA Division I-AA independents football standings
	Conf.			Overall
Team	W	L	T	W		L		T
No. 1 Lehigh ^		–		9	–	1	–	2
No. 6 Delaware		–		9	–	2	–	0
Southeastern Louisiana		–		8	–	2	–	0
No. 8 Northwestern State		–		8	–	3	–	0
Portland State		–		8	–	3	–	0
Bucknell		–		6	–	4	–	0
James Madison		–		4	–	6	–	0
Lafayette		–		3	–	7	–	0
Nicholls State		–		2	–	9	–	0
Northeastern		–		2	–	9	–	0
^ – NCAA Division I-AA playoff participant; Rankings from Associated Press poll

The 1980 Northwestern State Demons football team was an American football team that represented Northwestern State University as an independent during the 1980 NCAA Division I-AA football season. Led by sixth-year head coach A. L. Williams, the Demons compiled an 8–3 record.

== Schedule ==
Date	Opponent	Rank	Site	Result	Attendance	Source
September 6	Abilene Christian		Harry Turpin Stadium; Natchitoches, LA	W 31–10	9,750	
September 13	UT Arlington		Harry Turpin Stadium; Natchitoches, LA	W 38–31		
September 20	at Stephen F. Austin		Lumberjack Stadium; Nacogdoches, TX (rivalry)	W 22–3	8,500	
September 27	at McNeese State	No. 9	Cowboy Stadium; Lake Charles, LA (rivalry)	W 13–10		
October 4	at Northeast Louisiana	No. 4т	Malone Stadium; Monroe, LA (rivalry)	L 14–38	16,971	
October 11	New York Tech	No. 10т	Harry Turpin Stadium; Natchitoches, LA	W 48–6		
October 18	vs. Louisiana Tech	No. 10т	State Fair Stadium; Shreveport, LA (rivalry)	L 23–27	36,000	
October 25	at Central Michigan		Perry Shorts Stadium; Mount Pleasant, MI	L 0–17		
November 1	Portland State		Harry Turpin Stadium; Natchitoches, LA	W 40–21	7,000	
November 8	Nicholls State		Harry Turpin Stadium; Natchitoches, LA (rivalry)	W 21–14	7,000	
November 22	Southeastern Louisiana	No. 10т	Harry Turpin Stadium; Natchitoches, LA (rivalry)	W 16–14	3,000	
Rankings from Associated Press Poll released prior to the game
