= 1980 Louisville Cardinals football team =

American college football season

1980 Louisville Cardinals football
- Conference: Independent
- Record: 5–6
- Head coach: Bob Weber (1st season)
- Home stadium: Fairgrounds Stadium

1980 NCAA Division I-A independents football records
	Conf.					Overall
Team	W		L		T	W		L		T
No. 2 Pittsburgh		–		–		11	–	1	–	0
Tennessee State		–		–		9	–	1	–	0
No. 5 Florida State		–		–		10	–	2	–	0
No. 8 Penn State		–		–		10	–	2	–	0
No. 9 Notre Dame		–		–		9	–	2	–	1
No. 18 Miami (FL)		–		–		9	–	3	–	0
Southern Miss		–		–		9	–	3	–	0
Navy		–		–		8	–	4	–	0
South Carolina		–		–		8	–	4	–	0
Virginia Tech		–		–		8	–	4	–	0
Boston College		–		–		7	–	4	–	0
Northeast Louisiana		–		–		7	–	4	–	0
Rutgers		–		–		7	–	4	–	0
UNLV		–		–		7	–	4	–	0
Tulane		–		–		7	–	5	–	0
Colgate		–		–		5	–	4	–	1
North Texas State		–		–		6	–	5	–	0
Villanova		–		–		6	–	5	–	0
West Virginia		–		–		6	–	6	–	0
Louisville		–		–		5	–	6	–	0
Richmond		–		–		5	–	6	–	0
Syracuse		–		–		5	–	6	–	0
East Carolina		–		–		4	–	7	–	0
Illinois State		–		–		4	–	7	–	0
Temple		–		–		4	–	7	–	0
Army		–		–		3	–	7	–	1
Holy Cross		–		–		3	–	8	–	0
Cincinnati		–		–		2	–	9	–	0
Memphis State		–		–		2	–	9	–	0
William & Mary		–		–		2	–	9	–	0
Georgia Tech		–		–		1	–	9	–	1
Rankings from AP Poll

The 1980 Louisville Cardinals football team season was an American football team that represented the University of Louisville as an independent during the 1980 NCAA Division I-A football season. In their first season under head coach Bob Weber, the Cardinals compiled a 5–6 record and were outscored by a total of 203 to 162.

The team's statistical leaders included Pat Patterson with 933 passing yards, Don Craft with 687 rushing yards, Kenny Robinson with 401 receiving yards, and Dave Betz with 54 points scored.

== Schedule ==
Date	Opponent	Site	Result	Attendance	Source
September 6	Miami (FL)	Fairgrounds Stadium; Louisville, KY (rivalry)	L 10–24	21,120	
September 13	at No. 10 Florida State	Doak Campbell Stadium; Tallahassee, FL	L 0–52	52,623	
September 20	Murray State	Fairgrounds Stadium; Louisville, KY	L 9–13		
September 27	at Kansas	Memorial Stadium; Lawrence, KS	W 17–9	32,800	
October 11	Memphis State	Fairgrounds Stadium; Louisville, KY (rivalry)	W 38–14	15,501	
October 18	Indiana State	Fairgrounds Stadium; Louisville, KY	W 27–17	24,695	
October 25	at Florida	Florida Field; Gainesville, FL	L 0–13	62,687	
November 1	Temple	Fairgrounds Stadium; Louisville, KY	L 12–17	13,436	
November 8	at No. 9 Pittsburgh	Pitt Stadium; Pittsburgh, PA	L 23–41	47,280	
November 15	Cincinnati	Fairgrounds Stadium; Louisville, KY (rivalry)	W 20–0	12,629	
November 22	at Southern Miss	M. M. Roberts Stadium; Hattiesburg, MS	W 6–3	21,210	
Rankings from AP Poll released prior to the game

== Roster ==
1980 Louisville Cardinals football team roster
Players
Coaches
Offense

Pos.	#	Name	Class
QB	5	Dean May	Fr
WR	6	Mark Clayton	So
QB	12	Pat Patterson
G	66	Greg Dimoff
C	74	Jim Miller
OT	75	Joe Jacoby	Sr
OT	76	Tom Andrews	Fr

Defense

Pos.	#	Name	Class
CB	1	Frank Minnifield	So
LB	2	Greg Jones	So
CB	34	Roger Clay	So
LB	39	Anthony Williams	So
DT	97	Dan Williams	So
LB	99	Fred Blackmon	So

Special teams

Pos.	#	Name	Class

Head coach

- Bob Weber

Coordinators/assistant coaches

Legend

- (C) Team captain
- (S) Suspended
- (I) Ineligible
- Injured
- Redshirt
