= 1980 Illinois State Redbirds football team =

American college football season

1980 Illinois State Redbirds football
- Conference: Independent
- Record: 4–7
- Head coach: Charlie Cowdrey (4th season)
- MVP: Vic Friedrich
- Home stadium: Hancock Stadium

1980 NCAA Division I-A independents football records
	Conf.					Overall
Team	W		L		T	W		L		T
No. 2 Pittsburgh		–		–		11	–	1	–	0
Tennessee State		–		–		9	–	1	–	0
No. 5 Florida State		–		–		10	–	2	–	0
No. 8 Penn State		–		–		10	–	2	–	0
No. 9 Notre Dame		–		–		9	–	2	–	1
No. 18 Miami (FL)		–		–		9	–	3	–	0
Southern Miss		–		–		9	–	3	–	0
Navy		–		–		8	–	4	–	0
South Carolina		–		–		8	–	4	–	0
Virginia Tech		–		–		8	–	4	–	0
Boston College		–		–		7	–	4	–	0
Northeast Louisiana		–		–		7	–	4	–	0
Rutgers		–		–		7	–	4	–	0
UNLV		–		–		7	–	4	–	0
Tulane		–		–		7	–	5	–	0
Colgate		–		–		5	–	4	–	1
North Texas State		–		–		6	–	5	–	0
Villanova		–		–		6	–	5	–	0
West Virginia		–		–		6	–	6	–	0
Louisville		–		–		5	–	6	–	0
Richmond		–		–		5	–	6	–	0
Syracuse		–		–		5	–	6	–	0
East Carolina		–		–		4	–	7	–	0
Illinois State		–		–		4	–	7	–	0
Temple		–		–		4	–	7	–	0
Army		–		–		3	–	7	–	1
Holy Cross		–		–		3	–	8	–	0
Cincinnati		–		–		2	–	9	–	0
Memphis State		–		–		2	–	9	–	0
William & Mary		–		–		2	–	9	–	0
Georgia Tech		–		–		1	–	9	–	1
Rankings from AP Poll

The 1980 Illinois State Redbirds football team represented Illinois State University as an independent during the 1980 NCAA Division I-A football season. Led by fourth-year head coach Charlie Cowdrey, the Redbirds compiled a record of 2–7. Illinois State played home games at Hancock Stadium in Normal, Illinois.

== Schedule ==
Date	Opponent	Site	Result	Attendance	Source
September 6	Nicholls State	Hancock Stadium; Normal, IL	W 28–13	8,182	
September 13	Western Michigan	Hancock Stadium; Normal, IL	L 17–31	6,127	
September 20	at Central Michigan	Perry Shorts Stadium; Mount Pleasant, MI	L 0–16	20,028	
September 27	Southeastern Louisiana	Hancock Stadium; Normal, IL	L 21–28	6,622	
October 4	at Eastern Illinois	O'Brien Stadium; Charleston, IL	L 14–31	10,500	
October 11	at Northern Illinois	Huskie Stadium; DeKalb, IL	W 28–18	18,020	
October 18	Southern Illinois^{†}	Hancock Stadium; Normal, IL	L 0–42	13,369	
October 25	Indiana State	Hancock Stadium; Normal, IL	W 9–0	10,017	
November 1	at Western Illinois	Hanson Field; Macomb, IL	L 0–27	3,631	
November 8	at Eastern Michigan	Rynearson Stadium; Ypsilanti, MI	W 15–7	5,038	
November 15	at Chattanooga	Chamberlain Field; Chattanooga, Tennessee	L 19–27	5,200	
^{†}Homecoming

== Roster ==
1980 Illinois State Redbirds football team roster
Players
Coaches
Offense

Pos.	#	Name	Class
WR	13	Willie Boyd	Jr
WR	84	Clarence Collins	Fr
RB	32	Bill Fenn	Sr
FB	42	Dave George	So
C	53	Mark Rodenhauser	Fr

Defense

Pos.	#	Name	Class
LB	43	Pat Cassidy	Jr
DB	21	Jim Collier	Jr
DB	22	Curt Cox	Fr
DT	67	Bruce Edwards	So

Special teams

Pos.	#	Name	Class

Head coach

- Charlie Cowdrey

Coordinators/assistant coaches

Legend

- (C) Team captain
- (S) Suspended
- (I) Ineligible
- Injured
- Redshirt
