= 1980 Connecticut Huskies football team =

American college football season

1980 Connecticut Huskies football
- Conference: Yankee Conference
- Record: 7–3 (3–2 Yankee)
- Head coach: Walt Nadzak (4th season)
- Home stadium: Memorial Stadium

1980 Yankee Conference football standings
	Conf.					Overall
Team	W		L		T	W		L		T
No. 9 Boston University $	5	–	0	–	0	9	–	2	–	0
No. T–10 UMass	4	–	1	–	0	7	–	3	–	0
No. T–10 Connecticut	3	–	2	–	0	7	–	3	–	0
New Hampshire	2	–	3	–	0	6	–	4	–	0
Maine	1	–	4	–	0	4	–	7	–	0
Rhode Island	0	–	5	–	0	2	–	9	–	0
$ – Conference champion; Rankings from Associated Press poll

The 1980 Connecticut Huskies football team represented the University of Connecticut in the 1980 NCAA Division I-AA football season. The Huskies were led by fourth-year head coach Walt Nadzak, and completed the season with a record of 7–3.

== Schedule ==
Date	Opponent	Rank	Site	Result	Attendance	Source
September 6	at New Hampshire		Cowell Stadium; Durham, NH	W 20–10		
September 13	Bucknell*		Memorial Stadium; Storrs, CT	W 38–7	7,670	
September 20	at Northeastern*		Parsons Field; Brookline, MA	W 34–6		
September 27	at Yale*	No. T–2	Yale Bowl; New Haven, CT	L 10–20	34,500	
October 4	Colgate*		Memorial Stadium; Storrs, CT	W 24–21	11,439	
October 18	at Holy Cross*	No. 8	Fitton Field; Worcester, MA	W 18–17	6,000	
October 25	Maine	No. T–5	Memorial Stadium; Storrs, CT	W 14–13	5,000	
November 1	at No. T–10 UMass	No. 5	Alumni Stadium; Amherst, MA (rivalry)	L 21–39	12,146	
November 8	No. 4 Boston University	No. T–10	Memorial Stadium; Storrs, CT	L 24–28		
November 15	Rhode Island	No. T–10	Memorial Stadium; Storrs, CT (rivalry)	W 56–30	5,500	
*Non-conference game; Rankings from AP Poll released prior to the game

== Roster ==
1980 Connecticut Huskies football team roster
Players
Coaches
Offense

Pos.	#	Name	Class

Defense

Pos.	#	Name	Class
DE	96	John Dorsey	Fr
DE	48	Pete Rostosky	So

Special teams

Pos.	#	Name	Class

Head coach

- Walt Nadzak

Coordinators/assistant coaches

Legend

- (C) Team captain
- (S) Suspended
- (I) Ineligible
- Injured
- Redshirt
