= Ralph Leek =

American football player

Ralph Leek was an American football player for the Rutgers University Scarlet Knights. In 1980, he was a back-up to starting quarterback Ed McMichael. In 1981, as a junior, Leek was a starter. He ran for a one-yard touchdown in the fourth quarter of the first game of the season, as Rutgers defeated Syracuse 29-27. The following week, he threw one touchdown pass in a 13-5 victory over Colgate. Leek completed 72% of his pass attempts in those two games. In the third game, against Virginia, he was intercepted three times in the first half, but Rutgers won, 3-0. The Scarlet Knights started the season 5-1 but lost their last five games to finish at 5-6. Overall, Leek completed 80 of 167 passes for 926 yards in 1981; he also had five touchdown passes and 16 interceptions. Leek led Rutgers in passing yards and total offense yards (971), but his 16 interceptions set a single-season team record which was broken by Jacque LaPrarie in 1982.
