= 1980 Lehigh Engineers football team =

American college football season

1980 Lehigh Engineers football

NCAA Division I-AA Semifinal, L 20–23 vs. Eastern Kentucky
- Conference: Independent
- Record: 9–1–2
- Head coach: John Whitehead (5th season)
- Captains: Mike Crowe; Mark Yeager
- Home stadium: Taylor Stadium

1980 NCAA Division I-AA independents football standings
	Conf.			Overall
Team	W	L	T	W		L		T
No. 1 Lehigh ^		–		9	–	1	–	2
No. 6 Delaware		–		9	–	2	–	0
Southeastern Louisiana		–		8	–	2	–	0
No. 8 Northwestern State		–		8	–	3	–	0
Portland State		–		8	–	3	–	0
Bucknell		–		6	–	4	–	0
James Madison		–		4	–	6	–	0
Lafayette		–		3	–	7	–	0
Nicholls State		–		2	–	9	–	0
Northeastern		–		2	–	9	–	0
^ – NCAA Division I-AA playoff participant; Rankings from Associated Press poll

The 1980 Lehigh Engineers football team was an American football team that represented Lehigh University as an independent during the 1980 NCAA Division I-AA football season. Lehigh went undefeated through the regular season and was the No. 1-ranked team in Division I-AA, but lost its national semifinal game.

In their fifth year under head coach John Whitehead, the Engineers compiled a 9–1–2 record (9–0–2 in the regular season). Mike Crowe and Mark Yeager were the team captains.

The Engineers' participation in the 1980 Division I-AA playoff marked their third year of postseason play in a four-year stretch, beginning with the NCAA Division II Football Championship in 1977, and continuing with their loss in the 1979 NCAA Division I-AA Football Championship Game.

Lehigh played its home games at Taylor Stadium on the university's main campus in Bethlehem, Pennsylvania.

== Schedule ==
Date	Opponent	Rank	Site	Result	Attendance	Source
September 13	at Maine		Alumni Field; Orono, ME	W 37–6	6,000	
September 20	Colgate		Taylor Stadium; Bethlehem, PA	T 17–17	8,000	
September 26	at Penn		Franklin Field; Philadelphia, PA	W 35–6	14,864	
October 4	No. 2 Delaware	No. 10	Taylor Stadium; Bethlehem, PA (rivalry)	W 27–20	14,500	
October 11	at Army	No. T–3	Michie Stadium; West Point, NY	T 24–24	32,850	
October 18	at Davidson	No. 3	Richardson Stadium; Davidson, NC	W 49–14	6,500	
October 25	Bucknell	No. 3	Taylor Stadium; Bethlehem, PA	W 13–0	5,000	
November 1	James Madison	No. 3	Taylor Stadium; Bethlehem, PA	W 31–14		
November 8	Rhode Island	No. 2	Taylor Stadium; Bethlehem, PA	W 23–10	10,000	
November 15	Northeastern	No. 2	Taylor Stadium; Bethlehem, PA	W 42–19	7,363	
November 22	at Lafayette	No. 1	Fisher Field; Easton, PA (The Rivalry)	W 32–0	17,000	
December 13	No. 3 Eastern Kentucky	No. 1	Taylor Stadium; Bethlehem, PA (NCAA Division I-AA Semifinal)	L 20–23	11,500	
^ Parents Day; Rankings from AP Poll released prior to the game
