= 1980 Portland State Vikings football team =

American college football season

1980 Portland State Vikings football
- Conference: Independent
- Record: 8–3
- Head coach: Mouse Davis (6th season)
- Offensive scheme: Run and shoot
- Base defense: 4–3
- Captains: Neil Lomax; Ron Seawell
- Home stadium: Civic Stadium

1980 NCAA Division I-AA independents football standings
	Conf.			Overall
Team	W	L	T	W		L		T
No. 1 Lehigh ^		–		9	–	1	–	2
No. 6 Delaware		–		9	–	2	–	0
Southeastern Louisiana		–		8	–	2	–	0
No. 8 Northwestern State		–		8	–	3	–	0
Portland State		–		8	–	3	–	0
Bucknell		–		6	–	4	–	0
James Madison		–		4	–	6	–	0
Lafayette		–		3	–	7	–	0
Nicholls State		–		2	–	9	–	0
Northeastern		–		2	–	9	–	0
^ – NCAA Division I-AA playoff participant; Rankings from Associated Press poll

The 1980 Portland State Vikings football team was an American football team that represented Portland State University as an independent during the 1980 NCAA Division I-AA football season. In its sixth and final season under head coach Mouse Davis, the team compiled an 8–3 record and outscored opponents by a total of 550 to 209. The team utilized the run and shoot offense popularized by Davis and gained national acclaim for its high-scoring offensive output, including single-game tallies of 105 and 93 points. On the field, the team was led by senior quarterback Neil Lomax. During the 1980 season, Lomax tallied 4,094 passing yards and became the all-time leader in college football history with a career total of 13,200 passing yards.

== Schedule ==
Date	Opponent	Rank	Site	Result	Attendance	Source
September 6	North Dakota		Civic Stadium; Portland, OR	W 28–14	11,952	
September 20	Montana		Civic Stadium; Portland, OR	W 20–0	11,381	
September 27	at Idaho State	No. 10т	ASISU Minidome; Pocatello, ID	L 33–59	8,042	
October 4	at Idaho		Kibbie Dome; Moscow, ID	L 27–37	13,000	
October 11	at Puget Sound		Baker Stadium; Tacoma, WA	W 37–14	5,200	
October 18	Eastern Washington		Civic Stadium; Portland, OR	W 54–21	7,347	
October 25	Cal Poly Pomona		Civic Stadium; Portland, OR	W 93–7	6,152	
November 1	at Northwestern State		Harry Turpin Stadium; Natchitoches, LA	L 21–40	7,000	
November 8	Delaware State		Civic Stadium; Portland, OR	W 105–0	4,772	
November 15	South Dakota State		Civic Stadium; Portland, OR	W 48–17	4,976	
November 22	Weber State		Civic Stadium; Portland, OR	W 75–0	6,890	
Rankings from Associated Press Poll released prior to the game

== Roster ==
1980 Portland State Vikings football team roster
Players
Coaches
Offense

Pos.	#	Name	Class
QB	11	Neil Lomax	Sr
WR	86	Clint Didier	Sr

Defense

Pos.	#	Name	Class

Special teams

Pos.	#	Name	Class

Head coach

- Mouse Davis

Coordinators/assistant coaches

Legend

- (C) Team captain
- (S) Suspended
- (I) Ineligible
- Injured
- Redshirt

== Game summaries ==
=== Delaware State ===
	1	2	3	4	Total
Hornets	0	0	0	0	0
Vikings	49	14	35	7	105

Statistics	DSU	PSU
First downs	10	26
Total yards	61	451
Rushing yards	27	32
Passing yards	34	419
Turnovers	7	0
Time of possession	38:23	21:37

Team	Category	Player	Statistics
Delaware State	Passing	Rod Lester	5/18, 34 yards, INT
Delaware State	Rushing	Doug Picott	11 rushes, 53 yards
Delaware State	Receiving	Greg Lee	2 receptions, 18 yards
Portland State	Passing	Neil Lomax	16/28, 311 yards, 8 TD
Portland State	Rushing	Neil Lomax	3 rushes, 23 yards, TD
Portland State	Receiving	Clint Didier	8 receptions, 111 yards, 2 TD
