= 1980 UMass Minutemen football team =

American college football season

1980 UMass Minutemen football
- Conference: Yankee Conference
- Record: 7–3 (4–1 Yankee)
- Head coach: Bob Pickett (3rd season)
- Defensive coordinator: Jim Reid (3rd season)
- Home stadium: Alumni Stadium

1980 Yankee Conference football standings
	Conf.					Overall
Team	W		L		T	W		L		T
No. 9 Boston University $	5	–	0	–	0	9	–	2	–	0
No. T–10 UMass	4	–	1	–	0	7	–	3	–	0
No. T–10 Connecticut	3	–	2	–	0	7	–	3	–	0
New Hampshire	2	–	3	–	0	6	–	4	–	0
Maine	1	–	4	–	0	4	–	7	–	0
Rhode Island	0	–	5	–	0	2	–	9	–	0
$ – Conference champion; Rankings from Associated Press poll

The 1980 UMass Minutemen football team represented the University of Massachusetts Amherst in the 1980 NCAA Division I-AA football season as a member of the Yankee Conference. The team was coached by Bob Pickett and played its home games at Alumni Stadium in Hadley, Massachusetts. UMass finished the season with a record of 7–3 overall and 4–1 in conference play.

== Schedule ==
Date	Opponent	Rank	Site	Result	Attendance	Source
September 20	Villanova*		Alumni Stadium; Hadley, MA	W 24–12	11,494	
September 27	Delaware State*^{†}	No. T–10	Alumni Stadium; Hadley, MA	W 39–0	9,700	
October 4	at Rhode Island	No. 8	Meade Stadium; Kingston, RI	W 26–8	10,443	
October 11	No. T–10 Delaware*	No. T–3	Alumni Stadium; Hadley, MA	L 17–21	10,400	
October 18	at Maine	No. T–10	Alumni Field; Orono, ME	W 21–14	2,700	
October 25	at No. 8 Boston University	No. 9	Nickerson Field; Boston, MA	L 0–3	1,520	
November 1	No. 5 Connecticut	No. T–10	Alumni Stadium; Hadley, MA (rivalry)	W 39–21	12,146	
November 8	at Holy Cross*	No. T–10	Fitton Field; Worcester, MA	W 17–13	7,121	
November 15	No. T–10 New Hampshire	No. 9	Alumni Stadium; Hadley, MA (rivalry)	W 17–0	9,206	
November 22	Boston College*	No. T–10	Alumni Stadium; Hadley, MA (rivalry)	L 12–13	15,216	
*Non-conference game; ^{†}Homecoming; Rankings from AP Poll released prior to the game
