= 1980 NCAA Division I-AA football rankings =

The 1980 NCAA Division I-AA football rankings are from the Associated Press. This is for the 1980 season.

== Legend ==
| | Increase in ranking |
| | Decrease in ranking |
| | Not ranked previous week |
| (#–#) | Win–loss record |
| (Italics) | Number of first place votes |
| т | Tied with team above or below also with this symbol |

== Associated Press poll ==
| | Week 1 Sept 24 | Week 2 Oct 1 | Week 3 Oct 8 | Week 4 Oct 15 | Week 5 Oct 22 | Week 6 Oct 29 | Week 7 Nov 5 | Week 8 Nov 12 | Week 9 Nov 19 | Week 10 Nov 26 | |
|---|---|---|---|---|---|---|---|---|---|---|---|
| 1. | Murray State (3–0) | Murray State (4–0) | Murray State (5–0) т | Murray State (6–0) т | Murray State (7–0) | Murray State (8–0) т | South Carolina State (9–0) | South Carolina State (10–0) | Lehigh (8–0–2) т | Lehigh (9–0–2) | 1. |
| 2. | Connecticut (3–0) т | Delaware (3–0) | South Carolina State (5–0) т | South Carolina State (6–0) т | South Carolina State (7–0) | South Carolina State (8–0) т | Lehigh (6–0–2) | Lehigh (7–0–2) | Western Kentucky (9–0) т | Grambling State (9–1) | 2. |
| 3. | South Carolina State (3–0) т | South Carolina State (4–0) | UMass (3–0) т | Lehigh (3–0–2) | Lehigh (4–0–2) | Lehigh (5–0–2) | Western Kentucky (8–0) | Western Kentucky (9–0) | Grambling State (9–1) | Eastern Kentucky (9–2) т | 3. |
| 4. | Delaware (2–0) | Boston University (3–0) т | Lehigh (3–0–1) т | Western Kentucky (5–0) | Western Kentucky (6–0) | Western Kentucky (7–0) | Boston University (7–1) | Boston University (8–1) | Eastern Kentucky (8–2) | South Carolina State (10–1) т | 4. |
| 5. | Alcorn State (2–0) | Northwestern State (4–0) т | Western Kentucky (4–0) | Weber State (4–1) | Connecticut (5–1) т | Connecticut (6–1) | Eastern Kentucky (6–2) т | Boise State (7–2) т | South Carolina State (10–1) | Western Kentucky (9–1) | 5. |
| 6. | Nevada (2–0–1) | Western Kentucky (4–0) | Weber State (3–1) | Delaware (4–1) | Eastern Kentucky (5–1) т | Boise State (6–2) | Grambling State (7–1) т | Eastern Kentucky (7–2) т | Delaware (8–2) | Delaware (9–2) | 6. |
| 7. | Boston University (2–0) | Alcorn State (2–0) | Connecticut (4–1) | Eastern Kentucky (4–1) | Boise State (5–2) | Boston University (6–1) т | Boise State (6–2) | Grambling State (8–1) т | Boston University (8–2) т | Boise State (8–3) | 7. |
| 8. | Western Kentucky (3–0) | UMass (2–0) | Eastern Kentucky (3–1) | Connecticut (4–1) | Boston University (5–1) | Grambling State (6–1) т | Murray State (8–1) | Delaware (7–2) | UMass (7–2) т | Northwestern State (8–3) | 8. |
| 9. | Northwestern State (3–0) | Weber State (2–1) | Idaho (3–1) | Boise State (4–2) | UMass (4–1) | Delaware (5–2) | Delaware (6–2) | UMass (6–2) | Boise State (7–3) | Boston University (9–2) | 9. |
| 10. | Boise State (2–1) т | Lehigh (2–0) | Delaware (3–1) т | Alcorn State (3–1) т | Alcorn State (4–1) т | Bethune–Cookman (4–1–1) т | Alcorn State (5–2) т | Connecticut (6–3) т | Connecticut (7–3) т | Connecticut (7–3) т | 10. |
| 11. | Portland State (2–0) т | | Northwestern State (4–1) т | Boston University (4–1) т | Delaware (4–2) т | Eastern Kentucky (5–2) т | Connecticut (6–2) т | Murray State (8–2) т | Idaho State (6–4) т | UMass (7–3) т | 11. |
| 12. | UMass (1–0) т (Note: In the actual printed polls, UMass was listed as Massachusetts) | | Alcorn State (2–1) т | UMass (3–1) т | Grambling State (5–1–0) т | UMass (4–2) т | UMass (5–2) т | New Hampshire (6–3) т | Murray State (8–2) т | Murray State (9–2) т | 12. |
| 13. | | | | Northwestern State (5–1) т | Nevada (4–1–1) т | Nevada (4–2–1) т | | North Carolina A&T (7–2) т | Northwestern State (7–3) т | | 13. |
| | Week 1 Sept 24 | Week 2 Oct 1 | Week 3 Oct 8 | Week 4 Oct 15 | Week 5 Oct 22 | Week 6 Oct 29 | Week 7 Nov 5 | Week 8 Nov 12 | Week 9 Nov 19 | Week 10 Nov 26 | |
| | | Dropped: 2 Connecticut; 6 Nevada; 10 Boise State; 10 Portland State | Dropped: 4 Boston University | Dropped: 9 Idaho | Dropped: 5 Weber State; 10 Northwestern State | Dropped: 10 Alcorn State | Dropped: 10 Bethune–Cookman; 10 Nevada | Dropped: 10 Alcorn State | Dropped: 10 New Hampshire; 10 North Carolina A&T | Dropped: 10 Idaho State | |
