= Notre Dame Fighting Irish football statistical leaders =

The Notre Dame Fighting Irish football statistical leaders are individual statistical leaders of the Notre Dame Fighting Irish football program in various categories, including passing, rushing, receiving, total offense, defensive stats, kicking, and scoring. Within those areas, the lists identify single-game, single-season, and career leaders. The Fighting Irish represent the University of Notre Dame as an independent in the NCAA Division I Football Bowl Subdivision (FBS).

Although Notre Dame began competing in intercollegiate football in 1887, records from the early years are often incomplete and inconsistent and may not appear on this list. Notre Dame's official record book does not list a specific "modern era" beginning in a certain year, and the records listed below can go as far back as 1900, although they may not be complete.

These lists are dominated by more recent players for several reasons:

- Since the 1940s, seasons have increased from 10 games to 11 and then 12 games in length.
- The NCAA didn't allow freshmen to play varsity football until 1972 (with the exception of the World War II years), allowing players to have four-year careers.
- Since 2018, players have been allowed to participate in as many as four games in a redshirt season; previously, playing in even one game "burned" the redshirt. Since 2024, postseason games have not counted against the four-game limit. These changes to redshirt rules have given very recent players several extra games to accumulate statistics.
- Bowl games only began counting toward single-season and career statistics in 2002. Since then, the Fighting Irish have played in 19 bowl games and three other postseason games not billed as bowl games, allowing more recent players at least one extra game to accumulate statistics. Notre Dame no longer maintains a "bowl game" record in its official football record book, instead maintaining a "postseason record" that includes bowl games as well as the 2013 BCS National Championship Game (2012 season) and two games in the 2024–25 College Football Playoff—a first-round game and the 2025 College Football Playoff National Championship.

Stats are updated through Week 12 the 2026 season. Active players are listed in bold.

== Passing ==
=== Passing yards ===
Career
Rank	Player	Yards	Years
1	Brady Quinn	11,762	2003 2004 2005 2006
2	Ian Book	8,948	2017 2018 2019 2020
3	Jimmy Clausen	8,148	2007 2008 2009
4	Tommy Rees	7,670	2010 2011 2012 2013
5	Ron Powlus	7,602	1994 1995 1996 1997
6	Steve Beuerlein	6,527	1983 1984 1985 1986
7	Rick Mirer	5,997	1989 1990 1991 1992
8	Everett Golson	5,850	2012 2014
9	DeShone Kizer	5,809	2015 2016
10	**C.J. Carr**	5,438	2025 2026

Single season
Rank	Player	Yards	Year
1	Brady Quinn	3,919	2005
2	Jimmy Clausen	3,722	2009
3	Everett Golson	3,445	2014
4	Brady Quinn	3,426	2006
5	Tommy Rees	3,257	2013
6	Jimmy Clausen	3,172	2008
7	Jack Coan	3,150	2021
8	Ian Book	3,034	2019
9	DeShone Kizer	2,925	2016
10	DeShone Kizer	2,884	2015

Single game
Rank	Player	Yards	Year	Opponent
1	Joe Theismann	526	1970	USC
2	Jack Coan	509	2021	Oklahoma State
3	Brady Quinn	487	2005	Michigan State
4	DeShone Kizer	471	2016	Syracuse
5	Brady Quinn	467	2005	BYU
6	Jimmy Clausen	452	2009	Navy
7	Everett Golson	446	2014	Arizona State
8	Brady Quinn	440	2005	Purdue
9	Brady Quinn	432	2004	Purdue
	Brady Quinn	432	2005	Stanford

=== Passing touchdowns ===
Career
Rank	Player	TDs	Years
1	Brady Quinn	95	2003 2004 2005 2006
2	Ian Book	72	2017 2018 2019 2020
3	Tommy Rees	61	2010 2011 2012 2013
4	Jimmy Clausen	60	2007 2008 2009
5	Ron Powlus	52	1994 1995 1996 1997
6	**C.J. Carr**	48	2025 2026
7	DeShone Kizer	47	2015 2016
8	Rick Mirer	41	1989 1990 1991 1992
	Everett Golson	41	2012 2014
10	Jarious Jackson	34	1996 1997 1998 1999

Single season
Rank	Player	TDs	Year
1	Brady Quinn	37	2006
2	Ian Book	34	2019
3	Brady Quinn	32	2005
4	Everett Golson	29	2014
5	Jimmy Clausen	28	2009
6	Tommy Rees	27	2013
7	DeShone Kizer	26	2016
8	Jimmy Clausen	25	2008
	Jack Coan	25	2021
10	Sam Hartman	24	2023
	CJ Carr	24	2025
	**CJ Carr**	24	2026

Single game
Rank	Player	TDs	Year	Opponent
1	Brady Quinn	6	2005	BYU
2	Ian Book	5	2019	New Mexico
	Brady Quinn	5	2005	Michigan State
	Brady Quinn	5	2006	Michigan State
	Jimmy Clausen	5	2008	Hawaii
	Jimmy Clausen	5	2009	Stanford
	Tommy Rees	5	2013	Air Force
	DeShone Kizer	5	2016	Texas
	DeShone Kizer	5	2015	Pittsburgh
	Jack Coan	5	2021	Oklahoma State

== Rushing ==
=== Rushing yards ===
Career
Rank	Player	Yards	Years
1	Autry Denson	4,318	1995 1996 1997 1998
2	Allen Pinkett	4,131	1982 1983 1984 1985
3	Vagas Ferguson	3,472	1976 1977 1978 1979
4	Darius Walker	3,249	2004 2005 2006
5	Josh Adams	3,198	2015 2016 2017
6	Julius Jones	3,018	1999 2000 2001 2003
7	Jeremiyah Love	2,882	2023 2024 2025
8	Jerome Heavens	2,682	1975 1976 1977 1978
9	Cierre Wood	2,447	2009 2010 2011 2012
10	Phil Carter	2,409	1979 1980 1981 1982

Single season
Rank	Player	Yards	Year
1	Vagas Ferguson	1,437	1979
2	Josh Adams	1,430	2017
3	Allen Pinkett	1,394	1983
4	Jeremiyah Love	1,372	2025
5	Reggie Brooks	1,343	1992
6	Audric Estimé	1,341	2023
7	Julius Jones	1,268	2003
8	Autry Denson	1,268	1997
9	Darius Walker	1,267	2006
10	Darius Walker	1,196	2005

Single game
Rank	Player	Yards	Year	Opponent
1	Julius Jones	262	2003	Pittsburgh
2	Vagas Ferguson	255	1978	Georgia Tech
3	Phil Carter	254	1980	Michigan State
4	Audric Estimé	238	2023	Stanford
5	Josh Adams	229	2017	Boston College
6	Jeremiyah Love	228	2025	USC
7	Reggie Brooks	227	1992	USC
8	Jim Stone	224	1980	Miami (FL)
9	Julius Jones	221	2003	Navy
10	Vagas Ferguson	219	1978	Navy

=== Rushing touchdowns ===
Career
Rank	Player	TDs	Years
1	Allen Pinkett	49	1982 1983 1984 1985
2	Autry Denson	43	1995 1996 1997 1998
3	Louis J. Salmon	36	1900 1901 1902 1903
	Jeremiyah Love	36	2023 2024 2025
5	Jerome Bettis	33	1990 1991 1992
6	Vagas Ferguson	32	1976 1977 1978 1979
	Anthony Johnson	32	1986 1987 1988 1989
8	Stan Cofall	30	1914 1915 1916
9	Audric Estimé	29	2021 2022 2023
	Neil Worden	29	1951 1952 1953

Single season
Rank	Player	TDs	Year
1	Audric Estimé	18	2023
	Jeremiyah Love	18	2025
3	Vagas Ferguson	17	1979
	Allen Pinkett	17	1984
	Riley Leonard	17	2024
	Jeremiyah Love	17	2024
7	Bill Downs	16	1905
	Jerome Bettis	16	1991
	Allen Pinkett	16	1983
10	Louis J. Salmon	15	1903
	Autry Denson	15	1998

Single game
Rank	Player	TDs	Year	Opponent
1	Art Smith	7	1911	Loyola (Chicago)
2	Bill Downs	6	1905	DePauw
3	Frank Lonergan	4	1903	DePauw
	Frank Lonergan	4	1903	CPS
	Larry Conjar	4	1965	USC
	Allen Pinkett	4	1983	Penn State
	Allen Pinkett	4	1984	Penn State
	Brandon Wimbush	4	2017	Boston College
	Audric Estimé	4	2023	Stanford

== Receiving ==
=== Receptions ===
Career
Rank	Player	Rec	Years
1	Michael Floyd	271	2008 2009 2010 2011
2	T. J. Jones	181	2010 2011 2012 2013
3	Michael Mayer	180	2020 2021 2022
4	Jeff Samardzija	179	2003 2004 2005 2006
5	Rhema McKnight	170	2002 2003 2004 2005 2006
6	Thom Gatewood	157	1969 1970 1971
	Golden Tate	157	2007 2008 2009
8	Jordan Faison	154	2023 2024 2025 2026
9	Chase Claypool	150	2016 2017 2018 2019
10	Will Fuller	144	2013 2014 2015

Single season
Rank	Player	Rec	Year
1	Michael Floyd	100	2011
2	Golden Tate	93	2009
3	Michael Floyd	79	2010
4	Jeff Samardzija	78	2006
5	Thom Gatewood	77	1970
	Jeff Samardzija	77	2005
7	Will Fuller	76	2014
8	Michael Mayer	71	2021
9	T. J. Jones	70	2013
10	Maurice Stovall	69	2005

Single game
Rank	Player	Rec	Year	Opponent
1	Maurice Stovall	14	2005	BYU
2	Jim Seymour	13	1966	Purdue
	Michael Floyd	13	2011	Michigan
4	Thom Gatewood	12	1970	Purdue
	Bobby Brown	12	1999	Pittsburgh
	Michael Floyd	12	2011	Purdue
	Michael Floyd	12	2011	South Florida
8	Jim Kelly	11	1962	Pittsburgh
	Jim Seymour	11	1966	USC
	Golden Tate	11	2009	Boston College
	Michael Floyd	11	2010	USC
	Michael Floyd	11	2010	Tulsa
	Miles Boykin	11	2018	Stanford
	Michael Mayer	11	2022	BYU

=== Receiving yards ===
Career
Rank	Player	Yards	Years
1	Michael Floyd	3,686	2008 2009 2010 2011
2	Golden Tate	2,707	2007 2008 2009
3	Jeff Samardzija	2,593	2003 2004 2005 2006
4	Derrick Mayes	2,512	1992 1993 1994 1995
	Will Fuller	2,512	2013 2014 2015
6	Tim Brown	2,493	1984 1985 1986 1987
7	T. J. Jones	2,429	2010 2011 2012 2013
8	Thom Gatewood	2,283	1969 1970 1971
9	Rhema McKnight	2,277	2002 2003 2004 2005 2006
10	Maurice Stovall	2,195	2002 2003 2004 2005

Single season
Rank	Player	Yards	Year
1	Golden Tate	1,496	2009
2	Will Fuller	1,258	2015
3	Jeff Samardzija	1,249	2005
4	Maurice Stovall	1,149	2005
5	Michael Floyd	1,147	2011
6	Thom Gatewood	1,123	1970
7	Jack Snow	1,114	1964
8	T. J. Jones	1,108	2013
9	Will Fuller	1,094	2014
10	Golden Tate	1,080	2008

Single game
Rank	Player	Yards	Year	Opponent
1	Jim Seymour	276	1966	Purdue
2	Golden Tate	244	2009	Washington
3	Jack Snow	217	1964	Wisconsin
4	Jim Morse	208	1955	USC
	Bobby Brown	208	1999	Pittsburgh
6	Maurice Stovall	207	2005	BYU
7	Golden Tate	201	2009	Stanford
8	Thom Gatewood	192	1970	Purdue
9	Jeff Samardzija	191	2005	Stanford
10	Michael Floyd	189	2009	Nevada

=== Receiving touchdowns ===
Career
Rank	Player	TDs	Years
1	Michael Floyd	37	2008 2009 2010 2011
2	Will Fuller	30	2013 2014 2015
3	Jeff Samardzija	27	2003 2004 2005 2006
4	Golden Tate	26	2007 2008 2009
5	Derrick Mayes	22	1992 1993 1994 1995
	Rhema McKnight	22	2002 2003 2004 2005 2006
7	Chase Claypool	19	2016 2017 2018 2019
	Thom Gatewood	19	1969 1970 1971
	T. J. Jones	19	2010 2011 2012 2013
10	Maurice Stovall	18	2002 2003 2004 2005
	Michael Mayer	18	2020 2021 2022

Single season
Rank	Player	TDs	Year
1	Will Fuller	15	2014
	Golden Tate	15	2009
	Rhema McKnight	15	2006
	Jeff Samardzija	15	2005
5	Will Fuller	14	2015
6	Chase Claypool	13	2019
7	Michael Floyd	12	2010
	Jeff Samardzija	12	2006
9	Maurice Stovall	11	2005
	Derrick Mayes	11	1994

Single game
Rank	Player	TDs	Year	Opponent
1	Maurice Stovall	4	2005	BYU
	Chase Claypool	4	2019	Navy
3	16 times by 13 players	3		Most recent: Javon McKinley, 2020 vs. Syracuse

== Total Offense/Scrimmage Offense ==
Total offense is the sum of passing and rushing statistics. It does not include receiving or returns.

=== Total offense yards ===
Career
Rank	Player	Yards	Years
1	Brady Quinn	11,944	2003 2004 2005 2006
2	Ian Book	10,466	2017 2018 2019 2020
3	Jimmy Clausen	7,793	2007 2008 2009
4	Tommy Rees	7,543	2010 2011 2012 2013
5	Ron Powlus	7,479	1994 1995 1996 1997
6	DeShone Kizer	6,801	2015 2016
7	Rick Mirer	6,691	1989 1990 1991 1992
8	Steve Beuerlein	6,459	1983 1984 1985 1986
9	Everett Golson	6,431	2012 2014
10	Jarious Jackson	5,777	1996 1997 1998 1999

Single season
Rank	Player	Yards	Year
1	Brady Quinn	4,009	2005
2	Riley Leonard	3,767	2024
3	Everett Golson	3,728	2014
4	Jimmy Clausen	3,627	2009
5	Ian Book	3,580	2019
6	Brady Quinn	3,497	2006
7	DeShone Kizer	3,404	2015
8	DeShone Kizer	3,397	2016
9	Ian Book	3,315	2020
10	Jarious Jackson	3,217	1999

Single game
Rank	Player	Yards	Year	Opponent
1	Joe Theismann	512	1970	USC
2	Jack Coan	505	2021	Oklahoma State
3	Brady Quinn	479	2005	Michigan State
4	DeShone Kizer	472	2016	Syracuse
5	Brady Quinn	463	2005	Purdue
6	Brady Quinn	457	2005	BYU
7	Brady Quinn	453	2005	Stanford
8	Jimmy Clausen	447	2009	Navy
9	DeShone Kizer	442	2015	Temple
10	DeShone Kizer	441	2016	Duke

=== Touchdowns responsible for ===
"Touchdowns responsible for" is the official NCAA term for combined passing and rushing touchdowns.

Career
Rank	Player	TDs	Years
1	Brady Quinn	101	2003 2004 2005 2006
2	Ian Book	89	2017 2018 2019 2020
3	Jimmy Clausen	65	2007 2008 2009
	DeShone Kizer	65	2015 2016
5	Tommy Rees	62	2010 2011 2012 2013
6	Rick Mirer	58	1989 1990 1991 1992
7	Ron Powlus	55	1994 1995 1996 1997
	Everett Golson	55	2012 2014
9	Allen Pinkett	54	1982 1983 1984 1985
	**C.J. Carr**	54	2025 2026

Single season
Rank	Player	TDs	Year
1	Brady Quinn	39	2006
2	Ian Book	38	2019
	Riley Leonard	38	2024
4	Everett Golson	37	2014
5	DeShone Kizer	34	2016
6	Brady Quinn	33	2005
7	Jimmy Clausen	31	2009
	DeShone Kizer	31	2015
9	Brandon Wimbush	30	2017
10	Rick Mirer	27	1991
	Tommy Rees	27	2013
	Jack Coan	27	2021
	Sam Hartman	27	2023
	**CJ Carr**	27	2026
	CJ Carr	27	2025

Single game
Rank	Player	TDs	Year	Opponent
1	Art Smith	7	1911	Loyola (Chicago)
2	Ian Book	6	2019	New Mexico
	Bill Downs	6	1905	DePauw
	Brady Quinn	6	2005	BYU
	Everett Golson	6	2014	Navy
	DeShone Kizer	6	2015	Pittsburgh
	DeShone Kizer	6	2016	Texas

=== Scrimmage Yards ===
"Scrimmage Yards" are the combination of yards gained from rushing and receiving, but not from passing or returning.

Career
Rank	Player (Position)	Yards	Years
1	Allen Pinkett (RB)	4,905	1982 1983 1984 1985
2	Autry Denson (RB)	4,750	1995 1996 1997 1998
3	Darius Walker (RB)	4,065	2004 2005 2006
4	Vagas Ferguson (RB)	3,838	1976 1977 1978 1979
5	Michael Floyd (WR)	3,716	2008 2009 2010 2011
6	Josh Adams (RB)	3,534	2015 2016 2017
7	Jeremiyah Love (RB)	3,476	2023 2024 2025
8	Julius Jones (RB)	3,268	1999 2000 2001 2003
9	Jerome Heavens (RB)	3,014	1975 1976 1977 1978
10	Armando Allen (RB)	2,977	2007 2008 2009 2010

=== Scrimmage Touchdowns ===
This list reflects touchdowns scored from scrimmage; accordingly, it includes rushing and receiving but not returning or passing touchdowns.

Career
Rank	Player (Position)	TDs	Years
1	Allen Pinkett (RB)	52	1982 1983 1984 1985
2	Autry Denson (RB)	46	1995 1996 1997 1998
3	Jeremiyah Love (RB)	42	2023 2024 2025
4	Michael Floyd (WR)	38	2008 2009 2010 2011
5	Louis J. Salmon (FB/K/P)	36	1900 1901 1902 1903
6	Vagas Ferguson (RB)	35	1976 1977 1978 1979
7	Anthony Johnson (RB)	34	1986 1987 1988 1989
8	Jerome Bettis (RB)	33	1990 1991 1992
9	Marc Edwards (RB)	32	1993 1994 1995 1996
10	Kyren Williams (RB)	31	2019 2020 2021

== Defense ==
=== Interceptions ===
Career
Rank	Player	Ints	Years
1	Luther Bradley	17	1973 1974 1975 1976 1977
2	Tom MacDonald	15	1961 1962 1963
3	Xavier Watts	13	2021 2022 2023 2024
	Johnny Lattner	13	1951 1952 1953
	Clarence Ellis	13	1969 1970 1971
	Ralph Stepaniak	13	1969 1970 1971
	Mike Townsend	13	1971 1972 1973
	Joe Restic	13	1975 1976 1977 1978
9	Dave Duerson	12	1979 1980 1981 1982
10	Todd Lyght	11	1987 1988 1989 1990
	Shane Walton	11	1999 2000 2001 2002

Single season
Rank	Player	Ints	Year
1	Mike Townsend	10	1972
2	Tom MacDonald	9	1962
3	Todd Lyght	8	1989
	Tony Carey	8	1964
	Angelo Bertelli	8	1989
6	Tom Schoen	7	1966
	Clarence Ellis	7	1970
	Dave Duerson	7	1982
	Shane Walton	7	2002
	Harrison Smith	7	2010
	Manti Te'o	7	2012
	Xavier Watts	7	2023

=== Tackles ===
Career
Rank	Player	Tackles	Years
1	Bob Crable	521	1978 1979 1980 1981
2	Bob Golic	479	1975 1976 1977 1978
3	Manti Te'o	437	2009 2010 2011 2012
4	Steve Heimkreiter	398	1975 1976 1977 1978
5	Bob Olson	369	1967 1968 1969
6	Tony Furjanic	361	1982 1983 1984 1985
7	Mike Kovaleski	353	1983 1984 1985 1986
8	Ross Browner	340	1973 1975 1976 1977
9	Mark Zavagnin	332	1979 1980 1981 1982
10	Te'von Coney	314	2015 2016 2017 2018

Single season
Rank	Player	Tackles	Year
1	Bob Crable	187	1979
2	Bob Crable	167	1981
3	Steve Heimkreiter	160	1978
4	Bob Crable	154	1980
5	Bob Golic	152	1978
6	Tony Furjanic	147	1985
7	Bob Golic	146	1977
8	Greg Collins	144	1974
9	Tony Furjanic	142	1983
10	Jim Carroll	140	1964

Single game
Rank	Player	Tackles	Year	Opponent
1	Bob Golic	26	1978	Michigan
	Bob Crable	26	1979	Clemson
3	Jeff Weston	22	1975	Navy
	Bob Golic	22	1978	Pittsburgh
	Chinedum Ndukwe	22	2006	Air Force
6	Manti Te'o	21	2010	Stanford
7	Bob Crable	20	1981	Michigan
8	Bob Golic	19	1978	Purdue
	Bob Crable	19	1980	Michigan
	Bob Crable	19	1980	Georgia Tech
	Bob Crable	19	1980	Alabama
	Bob Crable	19	1981	Florida State

=== Sacks ===
Career
Rank	Player	Sacks	Years
1	Isaiah Foskey	26.5	2019 2020 2021 2022
2	Justin Tuck	24.5	2002 2003 2004
3	Kory Minor	22.5	1995 1996 1997 1998
4	Victor Abiamiri	21.5	2003 2004 2005 2006
	Stephon Tuitt	21.5	2011 2012 2013
6	Mike Gann	21.0	1981 1982 1983 1984
7	Renaldo Wynn	19.5	1993 1994 1995 1996
	Prince Shembo	19.5	2010 2011 2012 2013
9	Ryan Roberts	19.0	1999 2000 2001 2002
10	Bryant Young	18.0	1990 1991 1992 1993

Single season
Rank	Player	Sacks	Year
1	Justin Tuck	13.5	2003
2	Stephon Tuitt	12.0	2012
3	Isaiah Foskey	11.0	2022
	Isaiah Foskey	11.0	2021
5	Victor Abiamiri	10.5	2006
6	Mike Gann	10.0	1984
	Bert Berry	10.0	1996
8	Renaldo Wynn	9.0	1996
9	Kory Minor	8.0	1996
	Anthony Weaver	8.0	2000
	Ryan Roberts	8.0	2002
	Victor Abiamiri	8.0	2005
	Romeo Okwara	8.0	2015
	Julian Okwara	8.0	2018
	Jerry Tillery	8.0	2018

Single game
Rank	Player	Sacks	Year	Opponent
1	Justin Tuck	4.0	2002	Pittsburgh
	Justin Tuck	4.0	2003	Stanford
	Victor Abiamiri	4.0	2005	Stanford
	Jerry Tillery	4.0	2018	Stanford
5	Justin Tuck	3.5	2003	Pittsburgh

== Kicking ==
=== Field goals made ===
Career
Rank	Player	FGs	Years
1	Justin Yoon	59	2015 2016 2017 2018
2	Kyle Brindza	57	2011 2012 2013 2014
3	John Carney	51	1984 1985 1986
4	Jonathan Doerer	49	2018 2019 2020 2021
5	Nick Setta	46	2000 2001 2002 2003
6	Dave Reeve	39	1974 1975 1976 1977
	Craig Hentrich	39	1989 1990 1991 1992
8	D. J. Fitzpatrick	34	2002 2003 2004 2005
	Jim Sanson	34	1996 1997 1998 1999
10	David Ruffer	33	2008 2009 2010 2011

Single season
Rank	Player	FGs	Year
1	Kyle Brindza	23	2012
2	John Carney	21	1986
3	Kyle Brindza	20	2013
4	Mike Johnston	19	1982
5	Harry Oliver	18	1980
	David Ruffer	18	2010
7	John Carney	17	1984
	Justin Yoon	17	2018
	Jonathan Doerer	17	2019
10	Craig Hentrich	16	1990
	Jonathan Doerer	16	2021

Single game
Rank	Player	FGs	Year	Opponent
1	Craig Hentrich	5	1990	Miami (FL)
	Nick Setta	5	2002	Maryland
	Nick Setta	5	2003	Washington State
	Nick Tausch	5	2009	Washington
	Kyle Brindza	5	2012	USC
	Kyle Brindza	5	2013	Rutgers (Pinstripe Bowl)
7	12 times by 8 players	4		Most recent: Jonathan Doerer, 2020 vs. Clemson

=== Field goal percentage ===
Career
Rank	Player	FG%	Years
1	Justin Yoon	80.8%	2015 2016 2017 2018
2	Jonathan Doerer	75.4%	2018 2019 2020 2021
3	John Carney	73.9%	1984 1985 1986
4	Blake Grupe	73.7%	2022
5	Kyle Brindza	70.4%	2011 2012 2013 2014

Single season
Rank	Player	FG%	Year
1	David Ruffer	94.7%	2010
2	John Carney	89.5%	1984
3	Nick Setta	88.2%	2001
	Justin Yoon	88.2%	2015

== Scoring ==
=== Points ===
Career
Rank	Player	Points	Years
1	Justin Yoon	367	2015 2016 2017 2018
2	Allen Pinkett	320	1982 1983 1984 1985
3	Jonathan Doerer	309	2018 2019 2020 2021
4	Craig Hentrich	294	1989 1990 1991 1992
5	Kyle Brindza	288	2011 2012 2013 2014
6	Autry Denson	282	1995 1996 1997 1998
7	Jeremiyah Love	254	2023 2024 2025
8	Louis J. Salmon	250	1900 1901 1902 1903
9	Nick Setta	248	2000 2001 2002 2003
10	Dave Reeve	247	1974 1975 1976 1977

Single season
Rank	Player	Points	Year
1	Jeremiyah Love	126	2025
2	Jerome Bettis	120	1991
3	Jeremiyah Love	116	2024
4	Allen Pinkett	110	1983
5	Allen Pinkett	108	1984
	Golden Tate	108	2009
	Jonathan Doerer	108	2019
	Audric Estimé	108	2023
9	Spencer Shrader	106	2023
10	Louis J. Salmon	105	1903

Single game
Rank	Player	Points	Year	Opponent
1	Art Smith	37	1911	Loyola (Chicago)
2	Bill Downs	30	1903	DePauw
	Alvin Berger	30	1912	St. Viator
	Willie Maher	30	1923	Kalamazoo
	Bill Wolski	30	1965	Pittsburgh
	DeShone Kizer	30	2015	Pittsburgh

=== Touchdowns ===
These lists reflect touchdowns scored. Accordingly, they include rushing, receiving, and return touchdowns, but not passing touchdowns.

Career
Rank	Player	TDs	Years
1	Allen Pinkett	53	1982 1983 1984 1985
2	Autry Denson	47	1995 1996 1997 1998
3	Jeremiyah Love	42	2023 2024 2025
4	Michael Floyd	38	2008 2009 2010 2011
5	Louis J. Salmon	36	1900 1901 1902 1903
6	Vagas Ferguson	35	1976 1977 1978 1979
7	Anthony Johnson	34	1986 1987 1988 1989
8	Jerome Bettis	33	1990 1991 1992
9	Marc Edwards	32	1993 1994 1995 1996
10	Kyren Williams	31	2019 2020 2021

Single season
Rank	Player	TDs	Year
1	Jeremiyah Love	21	2025
2	Jerome Bettis	20	1991
3	Jeremiyah Love	19	2024
4	Allen Pinkett	18	1983
	Allen Pinkett	18	1984
	Golden Tate	18	2009
	Audric Estimé	18	2023
8	Vagas Ferguson	17	1979
	Riley Leonard	17	2024
10	Bill Downs	16	1905

Single game
Rank	Player	TDs	Year	Opponent
1	Art Smith	7	1911	Loyola (Chicago)
2	Bill Downs	5	1903	DePauw
3	11 times by 9 players	4		Most recent: Jeremiyah Love, 2025 vs. Arkansas
