= 1980 Notre Dame Fighting Irish football team =

American college football season

1980 Notre Dame Fighting Irish football

Sugar Bowl, L 10–17 vs. Georgia
- Conference: Independent

Ranking
- Coaches: No. 10
- AP: No. 9
- Record: 9–2–1
- Head coach: Dan Devine (6th season)
- Defensive coordinator: Joe Yonto
- MVP: Bob Crable
- Captains: Bob Crable; Tom Gibbons; John Scully
- Home stadium: Notre Dame Stadium

1980 NCAA Division I-A independents football records
	Conf.					Overall
Team	W		L		T	W		L		T
No. 2 Pittsburgh		–		–		11	–	1	–	0
Tennessee State		–		–		9	–	1	–	0
No. 5 Florida State		–		–		10	–	2	–	0
No. 8 Penn State		–		–		10	–	2	–	0
No. 9 Notre Dame		–		–		9	–	2	–	1
No. 18 Miami (FL)		–		–		9	–	3	–	0
Southern Miss		–		–		9	–	3	–	0
Navy		–		–		8	–	4	–	0
South Carolina		–		–		8	–	4	–	0
Virginia Tech		–		–		8	–	4	–	0
Boston College		–		–		7	–	4	–	0
Northeast Louisiana		–		–		7	–	4	–	0
Rutgers		–		–		7	–	4	–	0
UNLV		–		–		7	–	4	–	0
Tulane		–		–		7	–	5	–	0
Colgate		–		–		5	–	4	–	1
North Texas State		–		–		6	–	5	–	0
Villanova		–		–		6	–	5	–	0
West Virginia		–		–		6	–	6	–	0
Louisville		–		–		5	–	6	–	0
Richmond		–		–		5	–	6	–	0
Syracuse		–		–		5	–	6	–	0
East Carolina		–		–		4	–	7	–	0
Illinois State		–		–		4	–	7	–	0
Temple		–		–		4	–	7	–	0
Army		–		–		3	–	7	–	1
Holy Cross		–		–		3	–	8	–	0
Cincinnati		–		–		2	–	9	–	0
Memphis State		–		–		2	–	9	–	0
William & Mary		–		–		2	–	9	–	0
Georgia Tech		–		–		1	–	9	–	1
Rankings from AP Poll

The 1980 Notre Dame Fighting Irish football team was an American football team that represented the University of Notre Dame as an independent during the 1980 NCAA Division I-A football season. In their sixth and final year under head coach Dan Devine, the Irish compiled a 9–2–1 record, outscored opponents by a total of 238 to 111, and were ranked No. 9 in the final AP poll and No. 10 in the final UPI poll. They were undefeated in their first ten games, but lost their final two games to No. 17 USC and to No. 1 Georgia in the Sugar Bowl.

Center John Scully and linebacker Bob Crable were consensus first-team picks on the 1980 All-America college football team. Defensive end Scott Zettek also received first-team All-America honors from the Associated Press. The team's statistical leaders included quarterback Blair Kiel (531 passing yards), running backs Jim Stone (908 rushing yards) and Phil Carter (822 rushing yards), tight end Tony Hunter (23 receptions for 303 yards), and kicker Harry Oliver (73 points scored).

The team played its home games at Notre Dame Stadium in Notre Dame, Indiana.

== Schedule ==
Date	Time	Opponent	Rank	Site	TV	Result	Attendance	Source
September 6	3:20 p.m.	No. 9 Purdue	No. 11	Notre Dame Stadium; Notre Dame, IN (rivalry)	ABC	W 31–10	59,075	
September 20	2:30 p.m.	No. 14 Michigan	No. 8	Notre Dame Stadium; Notre Dame, IN (rivalry)		W 29–27	59,075	
October 4	1:00 p.m.	at Michigan State	No. 7	Spartan Stadium; East Lansing, MI (rivalry)		W 26–21	76,821	
October 11	2:30 p.m.	No. 13 Miami (FL)	No. 7	Notre Dame Stadium; Notre Dame, IN (rivalry)		W 32–14	59,075	
October 18	2:30 p.m.	Army	No. 5	Notre Dame Stadium; Notre Dame, IN (rivalry)		W 30–3	59,075	
October 25	10:35 p.m.	at Arizona	No. 4	Arizona Stadium; Tucson, AZ		W 20–3	56,211	
November 1	1:30 p.m.	vs. Navy	No. 3	Giants Stadium; East Rutherford, NJ (rivalry)		W 33–0	76,891	
November 8	1:30 p.m.	at Georgia Tech	No. 1	Grant Field; Atlanta, GA (rivalry)		T 3–3	41,266	
November 15	3:50 p.m.	at No. 5 Alabama	No. 6	Legion Field; Birmingham, AL	ABC	W 7–0	78,873	
November 22	1:30 p.m.	Air Force	No. 2	Notre Dame Stadium; Notre Dame, IN (rivalry)		W 24–10	59,075	
December 6	3:50 p.m.	at No. 17 USC	No. 2	Los Angeles Memorial Coliseum; Los Angeles, CA (rivalry)	ABC	L 3–20	82,663	
January 1, 1981	2:00 p.m.	vs. No. 1 Georgia	No. 7	Louisiana Superdome; New Orleans, LA (Sugar Bowl)	ABC	L 10–17	77,895	
Rankings from AP Poll released prior to the game; All times are in Eastern time

== Game summaries ==
=== Purdue ===
#9 Purdue Boilermakers (0–0) at #11 Notre Dame Fighting Irish (0–0)

Quarter	1	2	3	4	Total
Purdue	0	10	0	0	10
Notre Dame	10	7	7	7	31

at Notre Dame Stadium, South Bend, Indiana

- Date: September 6
- Game attendance: 59,075
- TV announcers (ABC): Keith Jackson and Frank Broyles
- Recap/Box

Game information

First quarter

- ND – Harry Oliver 36-yard field goal, 7:19. Notre Dame 3–0. Drive: 5 plays, 28 yards, 2:50.
- ND – Rob McGarry 2-yard run (Harry Oliver kick), 0:42. Notre Dame 10–0. Drive: 9 plays, 57 yards, 4:48.

Second quarter

- ND – Phil Carter 1-yard run (Harry Oliver kick), 11:40. Notre Dame 17–0. Drive: 7 plays, 46 yards, 3:16.
- PUR – Rick Anderson 26-yard field goal, 4:19. Notre Dame 17–3. Drive: 14 plays, 74 yards, 7:21.
- PUR – Wally Jones 4-yard run (Rick Anderson kick), 0:34. Notre Dame 17–10. Drive: 8 plays, 68 yards, 3:04.

Third quarter

- ND – Tony Hunter 9-yard pass from Mike Courey (Harry Oliver kick), 11:36. Notre Dame 24–10. Drive: 7 plays, 76 yards, 3:24.

Fourth quarter

- ND – Mike Courey 14-yard run (Harry Oliver kick), 4:01. Notre Dame 31–10. Drive: 9 plays, 62 yards, 4:50.

Top passers

- PUR – Scott Campbell – 17/26, 178 yards
- ND – Mike Courey – 10/13, 151 yards, TD, INT

Top rushers

- PUR – John Macon – 9 rushes, 32 yards
- ND – Phil Carter – 29 rushes, 142 yards, TD

Top receivers

- PUR – Dave Young – 6 receptions, 71 yards
- ND – Tony Hunter – 3 receptions, 75 yards, TD

ABC Player of Game - Mike Courey (151 yards passing, TD, 59 yards rushing, TD)

=== Michigan ===
#14 Michigan Wolverines (1–0) at #8 Notre Dame Fighting Irish (1–0)

Quarter	1	2	3	4	Total
Michigan	0	14	7	6	27
Notre Dame	0	14	6	9	29

at Notre Dame Stadium, South Bend, Indiana

- Date: September 20
- Game attendance: 59,075
- Recap/Box

Game information

First quarter

- No scoring

Second quarter

- ND – Phil Carter 6-yard run (Harry Oliver kick), 13:05. Notre Dame 7–0. Drive: 16 plays, 70 yards, 7:49.
- ND – Pete Holohan 10-yard pass from Mike Courey (Harry Oliver kick), 5:00. Notre Dame 14–0. Drive: 11 plays, 51 yards, 5:56.
- MICH – Lawrence Ricks 8-yard pass from John Wangler (Ali Haji-Sheikh kick), 1:50. Notre Dame 14–7. Drive: 8 plays, 68 yards, 3:10.
- MICH – Norm Betts 9-yard pass from John Wangler (Ali Haji-Sheikh kick), 0:31. Tie 14–14. Drive: 5 plays, 27 yards, 0:59.

Third quarter

- MICH – Stan Edwards 2-yard run (Ali Haji-Sheikh kick), 11:57. Michigan 21–14. Drive: 6 plays, 32 yards, 3:03.
- ND – John Krimm 49-yard interception return (kick failed), 1:03. Michigan 21–20.

Fourth quarter

- ND – Phil Carter 4-yard run (pass failed), 3:03. Notre Dame 26–21. Drive: 11 plays, 74 yards, 4:30.
- MICH – Craig Dunaway 1-yard pass from John Wangler (pass failed), 0:41. Michigan 27–26. Drive: 10 plays, 78 yards, 2:12.
- ND – Harry Oliver 51-yard field goal, 0:00. Notre Dame 29–27. Drive: 5 plays, 46 yards, 0:41.

Top passers

- MICH – John Wangler – 11/19, 98 yards, 3 TD, INT
- ND – Mike Courey – 6/13, 62 yards, TD, 2 INT

Top rushers

- MICH – Lawrence Ricks – 14 rushes, 83 yards
- ND – Phil Carter – 30 rushes, 103 yards, 2 TD

Top receivers

- MICH – Anthony Carter – 2 receptions, 30 yards
- ND – Pete Holohan – 2 receptions, 41 yards, TD

Harry Oliver kicked the game-winning field goal as time expired.

=== At Michigan State ===
#7 Notre Dame Fighting Irish (2–0) at Michigan State Spartans (1–2)

Quarter	1	2	3	4	Total
Notre Dame	0	6	7	13	26
Michigan State	9	0	0	12	21

at Spartan Stadium, East Lansing, Michigan

- Date: October 4
- Game attendance: 76,821
- Recap/Box

Game information

First quarter

- MSU – Morten Andersen 29-yard field goal, 10:30. Michigan State 3–0. Drive: 4 plays, 22 yards, 1:16.
- MSU – Steve Smith 1-yard run (pass failed), 3:26. Michigan State 9–0. Drive: 10 plays, 60 yards, 5:09.

Second quarter

- ND – Harry Oliver 44-yard field goal, 14:48. Michigan State 9–3. Drive: 10 plays, 45 yards, 3:38.
- ND – Harry Oliver 28-yard field goal, 0:02. Michigan State 9–6. Drive: 6 plays, 49 yards, 0:42.

Third quarter

- ND – Phil Carter 12-yard run (Harry Oliver kick), 5:33. Notre Dame 13–9. Drive: 8 plays, 51 yards, 3:27.

Fourth quarter

- ND – Harry Oliver 27-yard field goal, 10:09. Notre Dame 16–9. Drive: 6 plays, 47 yards, 2:55.
- MSU – Anthony Ellis 13-yard run (pass failed), 8:48. Notre Dame 16–15. Drive: 4 plays, 69 yards, 1:21.
- ND – Jim Stone 1-yard run (Harry Oliver kick), 7:49. Notre Dame 23–15. Drive: 3 plays, 59 yards, 0:59.
- MSU – Steve Smith 42-yard pass from John Leister (pass failed), 6:35. Notre Dame 23–21. Drive: 4 plays, 83 yards, 1:14.
- ND – Harry Oliver 32-yard field goal, 0:46. Notre Dame 26–21. Drive: 11 plays, 63 yards, 5:49.

Top passers

- ND – Blair Kiel – 5/10, 56 yards
- MSU – John Leister – 11/32, 204 yards, TD, INT

Top rushers

- ND – Phil Carter – 40 rushes, 254 yards, TD
- MSU – Steve Smith – 9 rushes, 44 yards, TD

Top receivers

- ND – Tony Hunter – 3 receptions, 46 yards
- MSU – Steve Smith – 2 receptions, 57 yards, TD

Blair Kiel started the second half at quarterback

=== Miami (FL) ===
#13 Miami (FL) Hurricanes (4–0) at #7 Notre Dame Fighting Irish (3–0)

Quarter	1	2	3	4	Total
Miami (FL)	0	0	0	14	14
Notre Dame	0	10	6	16	32

at Notre Dame Stadium, South Bend, Indiana

- Date: October 11
- Game attendance: 59,075
- Recap/Box

Game information

First quarter

- No scoring

Second quarter

- ND – Blair Kiel 4-yard run (Harry Oliver kick), 0:56. Notre Dame 7–0. Drive: 5 plays, 29 yards, 0:41.
- ND – Harry Oliver 19-yard field goal, 0:14. Notre Dame 10–0. Drive: 7 plays, 16 yards, 0:39.

Third quarter

- ND – Harry Oliver 28-yard field goal, 4:53. Notre Dame 13–0. Drive: 7 plays, 20 yards, 3:13.
- ND – Harry Oliver 38-yard field goal, 2:17. Notre Dame 16–0. Drive: 4 plays, -4 yards, 2:20.

Fourth quarter

- MIA – Pat Walker 13-yard pass from Jim Kelly (pass failed), 13:52. Notre Dame 16–6. Drive: 7 plays, 58 yards, 1:37.
- ND – Tom Gibbons 53-yard interception return (kick failed), 11:08. Notre Dame 22–6.
- MIA – Mark Cooper 37-yard pass from Jim Kelly (pass good), 8:43. Notre Dame 22–14. Drive: 8 plays, 62 yards, 2:25.
- ND – Harry Oliver 37-yard field goal, 2:06. Notre Dame 25–14. Drive: 12 plays, 52 yards, 6:37.
- ND – Jim Stone 27-yard run (Harry Oliver kick), 0:09. Notre Dame 32–14. Drive: 3 plays, 30 yards, 1:07.

Top passers

- MIA – Jim Kelly – 13/31, 220 yards, 2 TD, INT
- ND – Blair Kiel – 4/17, 35 yards

Top rushers

- MIA – Chris Hobbs – 5 rushes, 13 yards
- ND – Jim Stone – 38 rushes, 224 yards, TD

Top receivers

- MIA – Jim Joiner – 3 receptions, 97 yards
- ND – Tony Hunter – 2 receptions, 19 yards

- Blair Kiel - first freshman QB to start at Notre Dame since 1951 (Ralph Guglielmi)
- Jim Stone - starting in place of injured Phil Carter gains over 200 yards

=== Army ===
Army Cadets (2–2–1) at #5 Notre Dame Fighting Irish (4–0)

Quarter	1	2	3	4	Total
Army	0	0	3	0	3
Notre Dame	0	17	6	7	30

at Notre Dame Stadium, South Bend, Indiana

- Date: October 18
- Game attendance: 59,075
- Recap/Box

Game information

First quarter

- No scoring

Second quarter

- ND – Jim Stone 4-yard run (Harry Oliver kick), 8:22. Notre Dame 7–0. Drive: 5 plays, 44 yards, 2:08.
- ND – Harry Oliver 49-yard field goal, 1:30. Notre Dame 10–0. Drive: 11 plays, 53 yards, 3:08.
- ND – Mark Zavagnin recovery of blocked punt in end zone (Harry Oliver kick), 0:29. Notre Dame 17–0.

Third quarter

- ARMY – Dave Aucoin 41-yard field goal, 11:03. Notre Dame 17–3. Drive: 6 plays, 22 yards, 2:32.
- ND – Blair Kiel 1-yard run (kick failed), 0:40. Notre Dame 23–3. Drive: 11 plays, 39 yards, 4:29.

Fourth quarter

- ND – Ty Barber 1-yard run (Mike Johnston kick), 14:14. Notre Dame 30–3. Drive: 3 plays, 45 yards, 0:46.

Top passers

- ARMY – T.D. Decker – 4/15, 46 yards, INT
- ND – Blair Kiel – 7/19, 74 yards

Top rushers

- ARMY – Dino Harris – 10 rushes, 43 yards
- ND – Jim Stone – 25 rushes, 122 yards

Top receivers

- ARMY – Warren Waldorff – 2 receptions, 23 yards
- ND – Nick Vehr – 3 receptions, 44 yards

=== At Arizona ===
#4 Notre Dame Fighting Irish (5–0) at Arizona Wildcats (2–3)

Quarter	1	2	3	4	Total
Notre Dame	7	10	0	3	20
Arizona	0	3	0	0	3

at Arizona Stadium, Tucson, Arizona

- Date: October 25
- Game attendance: 56,211
- Recap/Box

Game information

First quarter

- ND – Jim Stone 1-yard run (Harry Oliver kick), 6:54. Notre Dame 7–0. Drive: 14 plays, 80 yards, 8:06.

Second quarter

- UA – Brett Weber 21-yard field goal, 3:16. Notre Dame 7–3. Drive: 10 plays, 58 yards, 3:21.
- ND – Blair Kiel 80-yard run (Harry Oliver kick), 2:08. Notre Dame 14–3. Drive: 4 plays, 85 yards, 1:03.
- ND – Harry Oliver 28-yard field goal, 0:00. Notre Dame 17–3. Drive: 8 plays, 27 yards, 1:06.

Third quarter

- No scoring

Fourth quarter

- ND – Harry Oliver 38-yard field goal, 3:26. Notre Dame 20–3. Drive: 4 plays, 4 yards, 1:44.

Top passers

- ND – Blair Kiel – 11/20, 152 yards, INT
- UA – Tom Tunnicliffe – 15/26, 95 yards, 2 INT

Top rushers

- ND – Jim Stone – 29 rushes, 105 yards, TD
- UA – Hubert Oliver – 8 rushes, 41 yards

Top receivers

- ND – Tony Hunter – 7 receptions, 75 yards
- UA – Tim Holmes – 2 receptions, 43 yards

Dan Devine's 50th win at Notre Dame

=== Vs. Navy ===
Navy Midshipmen (5–2) vs. #3 Notre Dame Fighting Irish (6–0)

Quarter	1	2	3	4	Total
Notre Dame	12	14	0	7	33
Navy	0	0	0	0	0

at Giants Stadium, East Rutherford, New Jersey

- Date: November 1
- Game weather: Overcast
- Game attendance: 76,891
- Recap/Box

Game information

First quarter

- ND – Ty Barber 9-yard run (kick blocked), 5:37. Notre Dame 6–0. Drive: 5 plays, 92 yards, 2:09.
- ND – Pete Buchanan 3-yard run (pass failed), 2:45. Notre Dame 12–0. Drive: 6 plays, 21 yards, 2:31.

Second quarter

- ND – Jim Stone 13-yard run (pass good), 12:40. Notre Dame 20–0. Drive: 8 plays, 56 yards, 3:00.
- ND – Harry Oliver 41-yard field goal, 10:34. Notre Dame 23–0. Drive: 3 plays, -9 yards, 1:58.
- ND – Harry Oliver 50-yard field goal, 1:26. Notre Dame 26–0. Drive: 3 plays, 2 yards, 1:23.

Third quarter

- No scoring

Fourth quarter

- ND – Greg Bell 27-yard run (Harry Oliver kick), 9:47. Notre Dame 33–0. Drive: 10 plays, 72 yards, 3:37.

Top passers

- ND – Blair Kiel – 3/8, 32 yards, INT
- NAVY – Tom Tarquinio – 7/11, 56 yards

Top rushers

- ND – Jim Stone – 33 rushes, 211 yards, TD
- NAVY – Eddie Meyers – 15 rushes, 53 yards

Top receivers

- ND – Tim Tripp – 1 reception, 17 yards
- NAVY – Tim Jackson – 2 receptions, 17 yards

- Scott Zettek - AP Midwest Lineman of the Week (8 tackles, 3 sacks)

=== At Georgia Tech ===
#1 Notre Dame Fighting Irish (7–0) at Georgia Tech Yellow Jackets (1–7)

Quarter	1	2	3	4	Total
Notre Dame	0	0	0	3	3
Georgia Tech	0	3	0	0	3

at Grant Field, Atlanta, Georgia

- Date: November 8
- Game time: 1:30 p.m.
- Game attendance: 41,266
- Recap/Box

Game information

First quarter

- No scoring

Second quarter

- GT – Johnny Smith 39-yard field goal, 6:11. Georgia Tech 3–0. Drive: 10 plays, 53 yards, 5:25.

Third quarter

- No scoring

Fourth quarter

- ND – Harry Oliver 47-yard field goal, 4:44. Tie 3–3. Drive: 7 plays, 60 yards, 3:04.

Top passers

- ND – Blair Kiel – 5/12, 58 yards, 2 INT
- GT – Ken Whisenhunt – 3/5, 29 yards

Top rushers

- ND – Jim Stone – 21 rushes, 85 yards
- GT – Matt Bryant – 10 rushes, 42 yards

Top receivers

- ND – Pete Holohan – 5 receptions, 63 yards
- GT – Leon Chadwick – 2 receptions, 20 yards

=== At Alabama ===
#6 Notre Dame Fighting Irish (7–0–1) at #5 Alabama Crimson Tide (8–1)

Quarter	1	2	3	4	Total
Notre Dame	0	7	0	0	7
Alabama	0	0	0	0	0

at Legion Field, Birmingham, Alabama

- Date: November 15
- Game time: 2:50 p.m. CST
- Game attendance: 78,873
- Referee: Jimmy Harper
- TV announcers (ABC): Keith Jackson and Frank Broyles
- Recap/Box

Game information

First quarter

- No scoring

Second quarter

- ND – Phil Carter 2-yard run (Harry Oliver kick), 6:02. Notre Dame 7–0. Drive: 2 plays, 4 yards, 0:34.

Third quarter

- No scoring

Fourth quarter

- No scoring

Top passers

- ND – Blair Kiel – 5/9, 43 yards
- ALA – Walter Lewis – 5/11, 53 yards

Top rushers

- ND – Phil Carter – 31 rushes, 84 yards, TD
- ALA – Walter Lewis – 12 rushes, 58 yards

Top receivers

- ND – Phil Carter – 2 receptions, 19 yards
- ALA – Bart Krout – 3 receptions, 25 yards

=== Air Force ===
Air Force Falcons (2–7–1) at #2 Notre Dame Fighting Irish (8–0–1)

Quarter	1	2	3	4	Total
Air Force	3	0	0	7	10
Notre Dame	0	3	14	7	24

at Notre Dame Stadium, South Bend, Indiana

- Date: November 22
- Game attendance: 59,075
- Recap/Box

Game information

First quarter

- AFA – Sean Pavlich 35-yard field goal, 1:06. Air Force 3–0. Drive: 6 plays, 31 yards, 2:35.

Second quarter

- ND – Harry Oliver 31-yard field goal, 14:09. Tie 3–3. Drive: 3 plays, 7 yards, 0:52.

Third quarter

- ND – Phil Carter 2-yard run (Harry Oliver kick), 5:17. Notre Dame 10–3. Drive: 14 plays, 76 yards, 6:40.
- ND – Jim Stone 7-yard run (Harry Oliver kick), 0:48. Notre Dame 17–3. Drive: 7 plays, 30 yards, 3:00.

Fourth quarter

- AFA – Charlie Heath 1-yard run (Sean Pavlich kick), 7:04. Notre Dame 17–10. Drive: 4 plays, 21 yards, 1:28.
- ND – Jim Stone 2-yard run (Harry Oliver kick), 1:51. Notre Dame 24–10. Drive: 12 plays, 80 yards, 5:13.

Top passers

- AFA – Scott Schafer – 3/15, 43 yards
- ND – Blair Kiel – 6/20, 67 yards, INT

Top rushers

- AFA – Ted Sundquist – 10 rushes, 41 yards
- ND – Phil Carter – 29 rushes, 181 yards, TD

Top receivers

- AFA – Charlie Heath – 2 receptions, 19 yards
- ND – Tony Hunter – 1 reception, 25 yards

=== At USC ===
#2 Notre Dame Fighting Irish (9–0–1) at #17 USC Trojans (7–2–1)

Quarter	1	2	3	4	Total
Notre Dame	0	0	3	0	3
USC	0	10	0	10	20

at Los Angeles Memorial Coliseum, Los Angeles, California

- Date: December 6
- Game attendance: 82,663
- TV announcers (ABC): Keith Jackson and Frank Broyles
- Recap/Box

Game information

First quarter

- No scoring

Second quarter

- USC – Michael Harper 6-yard run (Eric Hipp kick), 8:23. USC 7–0. Drive: 6 plays, 31 yards, 1:42.
- USC – Eric Hipp 22-yard field goal, 1:31. USC 10–0. Drive: 8 plays, 61 yards, 5:28.

Third quarter

- ND – Harry Oliver 30-yard field goal, 0:50. USC 10–3. Drive: 3 plays, -12 yards, 2:08.

Fourth quarter

- USC – Eric Hipp 17-yard field goal, 11:42. USC 13–3. Drive: 3 plays, 0 yards, 2:17.
- USC – Michael Harper 10-yard run (Eric Hipp kick), 1:09. USC 20–3. Drive: 11 plays, 70 yards, 4:25.

Top passers

- ND – Mike Courey – 3/8, 25 yards, 2 INT
- USC – Scott Tinsley – 4/5, 24 yards

Top rushers

- ND – Phil Carter – 20 rushes, 42 yards
- USC – Michael Harper – 20 rushes, 87 yards, 2 TD

Top receivers

- ND – Pete Holohan – 2 receptions, 19 yards
- USC – Jeff Simmons – 1 reception, 15 yards

=== Sugar Bowl (vs. Georgia) ===
#17 Notre Dame Fighting Irish (9–1–1) vs. #1 Georgia Bulldogs (11–0)

Quarter	1	2	3	4	Total
Notre Dame	3	0	7	0	10
Georgia	10	7	0	0	17

at Superdome, New Orleans, Louisiana

- Date: January 1, 1981
- Game weather: Indoors (dome)
- Game attendance: 77,895
- TV announcers (ABC): Keith Jackson and Frank Broyles
- Recap/Box

Game information

First quarter

- ND – Harry Oliver 50-yard field goal, 10:41. Notre Dame 3–0. Drive: 9 plays, 48 yards, 4:19.
- UGA – Rex Robinson 46-yard field goal, 1:45. Tie 3–3. Drive: 8 plays, 20 yards, 3:38.
- UGA – Herschel Walker 1-yard run (Rex Robinson kick), 1:04. Georgia 10–3. Drive: 2 plays, 1 yard, 0:41.

Second quarter

- UGA – Herschel Walker 3-yard run (Rex Robinson kick), 13:49. Georgia 17–3. Drive: 3 plays, 22 yards, 0:17.

Third quarter

- ND – Phil Carter 1-yard run (Harry Oliver kick), 0:54. Georgia 17–10. Drive: 10 plays, 57 yards, 4:25.

Fourth quarter

- No scoring

Top passers

- ND – Blair Kiel – 14/27, 138 yards, 2 INT
- UGA – Buck Belue – 1/12, 7 yards

Top rushers

- ND – Phil Carter – 27 rushes, 109 yards, TD
- UGA – Herschel Walker – 36 rushes, 150 yards, 2 TD

Top receivers

- ND – Pete Holohan – 4 receptions, 44 yards
- UGA – Amp Arnold – 1 reception, 7 yards

== Roster ==
1980 Notre Dame Fighting Irish football team roster
Players
Coaches
Offense

Pos.	#	Name	Class
RB	11	Bernie Adell
RB	12	Ty Barber
RB	28	Greg Bell	Fr
RB	17	Mike Boushka
FB	35	Pete Buchanan	So
G	65	Bob Burger	Sr
RB	22	Phil Carter	So
WR	80	Dave Condeni	Jr
QB	2	Mike Courey	Sr
TE	81	Marty Detmer	Sr
WR	1	Ty Dickerson	Sr
OT	76	Randy Ellis	So
OT	55	Robb Gagnon
QB	15	Scott Grooms	Fr
WR	31	Pete Holohan	Sr
G	78	Tim Huffman	Sr
WR	85	Tony Hunter	So
QB, P	5	Blair Kiel	Fr
QB	13	Greg Knafelc	Sr
QB	14	Tim Koegel	Sr
TE	86	Dean Masztak	Jr
FB	44	Rob McGarry	So
RB	39	Larry Moriarty	So
RB	25	Rodney Morris	So
RB	48	John Mosley	Fr
OT	71	Phil Pozderac	Jr
C	57	John Scully (C)	Sr
OT	74	Mike Shiner	So
RB	42	Jim Stone	Sr
QB	8	John Skronski	So
RB	33	John Sweeney	So
OL	64	Tom Thayer	So
WR	84	Tim Tripp	Jr
TE	95	Nick Vehr	Sr

Defense

Pos.	#	Name	Class
FS	21	Dave Barry	So
DT	94	Tom Bock	Jr
CB	9	Chris Brown	Fr
SS	40	Steve Cichy
ILB	43	Bob Crable (C)	Jr
S	22	Dave Duerson	So
S	20	Angelo Fasano	Sr
S	27	Tom Gibbons (C)	Sr
DE	92	Joe Gramke	Jr
DE	47	John Hankred	Sr
DL	63	Don Kidd
DE	98	Pat Kramer
CB	19	John Krimm	Jr
DT	77	Tim Marshall	Fr
LB	59	Brendan Moynihan
DT	72	Ken Muncy	So
LB	45	John Rice	Jr
LB	51	Joe Rudzinski	So
DB	30	Stacey Toran	Fr
LB	46	Mark Zavagnin	So
DE	70	Scott Zettek	Sr

Special teams

Pos.	#	Name	Class
K	4	Mike Johnston
K	3	Harry Oliver	Jr
LS	50	Bill Siewe	Sr

Head coach

- Dan Devine

Coordinators/assistant coaches

- Brian Boulac
- Bill Meyers
- Ron Toman (QB)
- Joe Yonto (DL)

Legend

- (C) Team captain
- (S) Suspended
- (I) Ineligible
- Injured
- Redshirt

== Awards and honors ==
- Former Fighting Irish coach Ara Parseghian was inducted into the College Football Hall of Fame
- Center John Scully was named an All-American (1980_All-America_college_football_team)

== Team players in the NFL ==
Player	Position	Round	Pick	NFL club
John Scully	Center	4	109	Atlanta Falcons
Pete Holohan	Tight end	7	189	San Diego Chargers
Scott Zettek	Defensive tackle	8	205	Chicago Bears
Jim Stone	Running back	9	223	Seattle Seahawks
Tim Huffman	Tackle	9	227	Green Bay Packers
John Hankerd	Linebacker	12	317	Denver Broncos
