= Ryan Roberts (American football) =

American football player (born 1980)

Profile
- Position: Defensive end

Personal information
- Born: August 11, 1980 (age 46); Camden, New Jersey, US
- Listed height: 6 ft 2 in (1.88 m)
- Listed weight: 258 lb (117 kg)

Career information
- High school: Haddonfield Memorial High School
- College: Notre Dame
- NFL draft: 2003: undrafted

Ryan Roberts (born August 11, 1980) is an American former football player who played defensive end in college football for the Notre Dame Fighting Irish football team from 1998 to 2002. He is an alumnus of Haddonfield Memorial High School.

== Early life ==
Roberts was born on August 11, 1980, in Camden, New Jersey, and earned three varsity letters in gridiron football at Haddonfield Memorial High School. Lawnside, New Jersey, was his hometown.

When Roberts began high school, he was a soccer player, but was urged by a friend to try football during the fall of his freshman year. He considered two conveniently located Ivy League institutions as potential colleges early in his high school career: in-state Princeton University and nearby University of Pennsylvania.

Due to a congenital condition, Roberts endured back pain while playing both running back and defensive end in high school. Nonetheless, he entered his senior season as a top-100 class of 1998 football recruit according to the Prep Football Report by Tom Lemming.

As a senior, Roberts rushed for over 1000 yards and had 10 quarterback sacks. His official visits included Iowa, Penn State and Notre Dame as well as invitations to visit schools such as Georgia Tech, Northwestern and Syracuse. At one point, he planned to use his five allotted official visits to see Syracuse, Notre Dame, Penn State, Iowa and North Carolina. In late December 1997, he verbally committed to Notre Dame. On February 5, 1998, Roberts signed his National Letter of Intent to play for Notre Dame.

Roberts was a 1997 USAToday honorable-mention All-American Football team selection at defensive end. He was also recognized as a 1997 First team All-State selection by the Associated Press. Roberts posted a safety during the inaugural Governor's Bowl All-Star Classic high school football contest of New York state all-stars vs. New Jersey All-stars. The game was an annual event until 2008, but was later reformatted.

== College career ==
Roberts began his Notre Dame career as a linebacker, but switched to defensive end after his freshman season for the 1998 Fighting Irish. He spent 1998 on the scout squad. Roberts played 10 games for the 1999 team but had a seemingly career-threatening fusion back surgery following the season. He only played 37 total minutes in 1999, but made 6 tackles, including one quarterback sack.

Following his surgery on January 13, 2000, he was sidelined through the spring and although not completely healed, was medically cleared to play in the fall. His weight dropped to 220 pounds (99.8 kg), while away from football. Senior Captain Grant Irons was lost for the season with a shoulder injury forcing Roberts into the starting lineup for the 2000 team. He started in 8 of 12 games, recording sacks in each of his first four games. His sack against Texas A&M came on his first play of the game.

After dislodging 5th-year senior Grant Irons from the lineup, he started 5 of 8 games for the 2001 team before season-ending medial collateral ligament injury. One of Roberts' career highlights was a 3-sack performance in 2001 in the rivalry game against USC, during the Carson Palmer era. In the game, he had a total of 4 tackles for a loss as well as a touchdown saving tackle to force a field goal. He also had a few open field rundown from behind tackles.

The 2001 season marked the second losing season in three years, which led to a tumultuous series of coaching transition events as George O'Leary was hired for five days before the discovery of a fake resume. Most of Roberts' Notre Dame career had been under head coach Bob Davie, but his 5th-year redshirt season for the 2002 team was Tyrone Willingham's first season as Notre Dame head coach. Willingham retained Greg Mattison as the defensive line coach, giving Roberts, who by now had earned a science-business degree, some continuity in 2002. The defensive line of Cedric Hilliard, Darrell Campbell, Roberts and Kyle Budinscak with reserves that included sophomore Justin Tuck, was a large part of Notre Dame's sudden rise to prominence in 2002. That year, Roberts posted 2 sacks against both Purdue's Kyle Orton and Michigan State's Jeff Smoker. His contributions helped Willingham become the winningest first-year head coach in Notre Dame history.

The 2021 Notre Dame Football Media Guide ranked Roberts 8th in career sacks and tied for 7th in single season sacks, and he was ranked fourth in school history for his 19 career sacks and 8 single-season sacks (2002) at the time that he completed his eligibility at Notre Dame following the 2002 season.

Roberts' senior season was the last season in which career-ending bowl games did not count in career stats. Thus, any sacks recorded in the 2003 Gator Bowl against Philip Rivers and NC State are not included in his career total. Roberts' name appears in the 2021 Notre Dame Football Media Guide school records for single-season and career sacks, but not among those with 3.5 or more single-game sacks or at least 19 single-game tackles. The South Bend Tribune reported that he had 23 tackles and 5 sacks against Rutgers in 2000, and 4 sacks against the 2000 West Virginia Mountaineers.

== See also ==
- Notre Dame Fighting Irish football statistical leaders
