= Rudy (film) =

1993 film by David Anspaugh

- Theatrical release poster
- Directed by: David Anspaugh
- Written by: Angelo Pizzo
- Produced by: Robert N. Fried; Cary Woods
- Starring: Sean Astin; Ned Beatty; Charles S. Dutton; Lili Taylor; Robert Prosky
- Cinematography: Oliver Wood
- Edited by: David Rosenbloom
- Music by: Jerry Goldsmith
- Distributed by: TriStar Pictures
- Release dates: August 28, 1993 (Toronto International Film Festival); October 18, 1993 (United States)
- Running time: 114 minutes
- Country: United States
- Language: English
- Budget: $18 million
- Box office: $32.8 million

Rudy is a 1993 American biographical sports film directed by David Anspaugh. It is an account of the life of "Rudy" Ruettiger, who harbored dreams of playing football at the University of Notre Dame despite significant obstacles. It was the first film that the Notre Dame administration allowed to be shot on campus since Knute Rockne, All American in 1938.

In 2005, Rudy was named one of the best 25 sports movies of the previous 25 years in two polls by ESPN (#24 by a panel of sports experts, and #4 by ESPN.com users). It was ranked the 54th-most inspiring film of all time in the American Film Institute's "100 Years" series.

The film premiered at the Toronto International Film Festival on August 28, 1993, and was released in the United States on October 18, 1993, by TriStar Pictures. It stars Sean Astin as the title character, along with Ned Beatty, Jason Miller, Robert Prosky, Lili Taylor, and Charles S. Dutton. Jon Favreau and Vince Vaughn had supporting roles in their first appearances in a major studio production. The script was written by Angelo Pizzo, who created Hoosiers (1986), which was also directed by Anspaugh.

== Plot ==
In the 1960s in Joliet, Illinois, Daniel Eugene "Rudy" Ruettiger dreams of playing football at Notre Dame. However, he lacks the grades and money to attend the university along with the talent and physical stature to play major college football. After high school, Rudy works at a steel mill with his Notre Dame fan father and his older brothers, John and Frank. After Rudy's supportive best friend Pete is killed in a mill explosion, Rudy decides to follow his dream.

In 1972, Rudy visits Notre Dame but is academically ineligible to enroll. With the help of local priest and former Notre Dame president Father John Cavanaugh, Rudy enrolls at nearby Holy Cross College, hoping to transfer. At Notre Dame Stadium, Rudy meets Fortune, the head groundskeeper. Initially indifferent to Rudy's plight, Fortune later leaves him blankets and a key to the office, giving Rudy a place to stay on campus. Rudy learns that despite working at the stadium for years, Fortune has never seen a Notre Dame football game.

Rudy befriends teaching assistant D-Bob, who helps him study in return for Rudy's helping him socially with girls. D-Bob tests Rudy for a learning disability, and the results indicate that Rudy has dyslexia. Despite his difficulties, Rudy works hard to become a better student. At Christmas, he returns home to find that his family appreciates his college academic achievements, but Frank still mocks Rudy for his attempts to play college football. Rudy persists, and even losing his girlfriend Sherry to his older brother Johnny does not deter him.

After two years at Holy Cross and three rejections for admission to Notre Dame, Rudy is finally accepted and attends football tryouts in the hope of making the team as a "walk-on". Assistant coach Warren warns the walk-ons that 35 scholarship players will not even make the "dress roster" of players who take the field during games. However, Coach Joe Yonto notices Rudy's determination and gives him a spot on the daily practice squad. Rudy tells Fortune and persuades him to promise to see Rudy's first game.

Rudy's hard work and dedication in practice convince head coach Ara Parseghian to let him suit up for one home game in his senior year. However, Parseghian retires following the 1974 season and is replaced by former Green Bay Packers head coach Dan Devine, who refuses to put Rudy on the game-day roster. Frustrated by not being on the dress list for the last home game, Rudy quits the team.

Fortune finds a distraught Rudy and reveals that he had actually played for Notre Dame years earlier. However, Fortune quit the team because he felt that his race kept him from playing; he has regretted this decision ever since. Reminded by Fortune that he has nothing to prove to anyone but himself and would forever regret quitting, Rudy returns to the team. When new head coach Dan Devine balks at allowing Rudy to dress for a game despite Parseghian's earlier promise, all of Rudy's fellow seniors line up and lay their jerseys on Devine's desk, requesting that Rudy be allowed to dress for the season's final game. Devine relents and lets Rudy suit up against Georgia Tech.

With Rudy's family and D-Bob in attendance, Steele invites Rudy to lead the team onto the field, and Fortune is there to see the game as promised. With Notre Dame leading 17–3 late in the fourth quarter, Devine sends all the seniors into the game except Rudy, despite Steele's and the assistant coaches' urging. Fans are aware of Rudy's goal from a story in the student newspaper, and a "Rudy!" chant begins in the stadium. Hearing this, the Notre Dame offense, led by tailback Jamie O'Hara, ignores Devine's call for victory formation and scores a quick touchdown. This gives defensive player Rudy a chance to get in the game and be entered onto the Fighting Irish roster. Devine finally lets Rudy play on the Notre Dame kickoff to Georgia Tech. Rudy stays in for the final play, sacks the Georgia Tech quarterback, and is carried off the field on his teammates' shoulders to cheers from the stadium.

An epilogue states that since 1975, no other Notre Dame player has been carried off the field as of the time of the film's release in 1993. (Note: In 1995, fullback Marc Edwards became the second Notre Dame player carried off the field by his teammates following their upset win over the USC Trojans.) Rudy graduated in 1976, and five of his younger brothers went on to earn college degrees.

== Cast ==
- Sean Astin as "Rudy" Ruettiger
- Jon Favreau as Dennis "D-Bob" McGowan
- Ned Beatty as Daniel Ruettiger, Sr.
- Charles S. Dutton as Fortune
- Robert Prosky as Father John Cavanaugh
- Jason Miller as Coach Ara Parseghian
- Lili Taylor as Sherry
- Mitch Rouse as Jim
- John Beasley as Assistant Coach Warren
- Vince Vaughn as Jamie O'Hara (Credited as "Vincent Vaughn")
- Scott Benjaminson as Frank
- John Duda as Young Frank
- Kevin Duda as 9-year-old Bernie
- Jake Armstrong as 13-year-old Bernie
- Chelcie Ross as Coach Dan Devine
- Ron Dean as Assistant Coach Joe Yonto
- Rudy Ruettiger – Cameo in a picture at the end of the movie, and in a crowd scene at the Georgia Tech game, behind Ned Beatty
- Greta Lind as Mary
- Christopher Reed as Pete
- Gerry Becker as Father Ted
- Diana James as Pick-up Girl #1
- Mindy Hester as Pick-up Girl #2

== Production ==
In 1982, Daniel "Rudy" Ruettiger initially pitched a film project based on his life story to Hollywood executives but failed to generate interest. Later, he entered into a deal with a screenwriter who allegedly deceived him, resulting in the loss of his life savings. Residing in South Bend, Indiana, near the University of Notre Dame, Ruettiger found renewed inspiration after watching the 1986 film Hoosiers. A fortuitous encounter in South Bend led him to obtain contact information for Hoosiers screenwriter Angelo Pizzo. Around 1989, Ruettiger persistently pursued Pizzo, who initially had no interest in creating another Indiana-based sports film, especially one set at Notre Dame, a school he disliked. Despite initial reluctance, Pizzo eventually mentioned the project to Hoosiers director David Anspaugh and producer Robert Fried.

In 1991, Fried successfully sold the project to Columbia Pictures, securing Anspaugh as the director and Pizzo as the writer. However, when Columbia's chairman Frank Price departed for Savoy Pictures, the new chairman Mark Canton put the film into turnaround in early 1992. Although Savoy Pictures nearly acquired the rights from Columbia, they opted out when foreign deals failed to materialize in time for an October 1992 production start.

TriStar Pictures joined the project in September 1992 and gave the green light to the $13-million film after resolving "last-minute rights claims against the property." Filmmakers had a two-week window to revise the script and just two days to secure permission to film at Notre Dame. The school had not agreed to allow its campus to be used as a film location since 1940's Knute Rockne, All American. Initially uninterested in another film about Notre Dame football, the university's administration, led by executive vice president Reverend William Beauchamp, changed its stance after reading Pizzo's script. They recognized it as a "heartwarming, enlivening story" about hard work that embodied the school's values.

The 50-day filming commenced on October 24, 1992, on the campus north of South Bend. Notre Dame, Holy Cross Junior College, and the local bar Cap N' Cork, served as filming sites. Notre Dame-specific locations encompassed its twin lakes, Notre Dame Stadium, the Basilica of the Sacred Heart, and the Golden Dome. Crowd scenes were captured during halftime at Notre Dame football games against Boston College and Penn State. The pivotal scene where players carry "Rudy" off the field was shot during that year's Notre Dame vs. Boston College game, with the 59,000 fans present chanting Rudy's name. N.F.L. Films, the National Football League's cinematic division, handled the filming of football action scenes. Following the six-week stint in South Bend, the production relocated to Chicago, Illinois, where the Thompson Steel Mill was used. The nearby town of Whiting, Indiana, stood in for Joliet, Illinois.

Actor Sean Astin, portraying the titular character, experienced "head-to-toe bruises" during the filming process. Additionally, Astin's stuntman sustained injuries, necessitating knee surgery by the conclusion of the shoot.

== Soundtrack ==
Rudy

Soundtrack album by Jerry Goldsmith
- Released: September 28, 1993
- Recorded: 1993
- Genre: Soundtrack
- Length: 36:44

The soundtrack was composed and conducted by Jerry Goldsmith and performed by the Hollywood Studio Symphony. Goldsmith had previously worked with Pizzo and Anspaugh on their successful 1986 film Hoosiers, garnering the film an Oscar nomination for Best Original Score and thus making Goldsmith their first choice to compose a soundtrack for Rudy.

1. "Main Title" (3:35)
2. "A Start" (2:27)
3. "Waiting" (2:35)
4. "Back on the Field" (2:07)
5. "To Notre Dame" (6:55)
6. "Tryouts" (4:27)
7. "The Key" (3:55)
8. "Take Us Out" (1:51)
9. "The Plaque" (2:36)
10. "The Final Game" (6:16)

According to Soundtrack.net, "Tryouts" has been used in 12 trailers, including those for Angels in the Outfield, BASEketball, The Deep End of the Ocean, Good Will Hunting, The Little Vampire, Mafia!, Seabiscuit and Spirit: Stallion of the Cimarron.

In 2008, Senator John McCain used "Take Us Out" as an official anthem during his presidential run. The piece of music was played at major events such as after Senator McCain's acceptance speech to the Republican National Convention and after John McCain announced Governor Sarah Palin as his running mate in Dayton, Ohio.

"Take Us Out" was played in the pilot episode of About a Boy, based on the 2002 film of the same name.

Also recorded in the film are performances of various Notre Dame fight songs by the Notre Dame Glee Club.

== Historical accuracy ==
In reality, Coach Dan Devine had announced that Ruettiger would dress for the Georgia Tech game during practice a few days before. The dramatic scene in which Ruettiger's senior teammates laid their jerseys on Devine's desk in protest never happened. According to Ruettiger, Devine was persuaded to allow him to dress only after a number of senior players requested that he do so. Devine had agreed to be depicted as the "heavy" in the film for dramatic effect but was chagrined to find out the extent to which he was vilified, saying: "The jersey scene is unforgivable. It's a lie and untrue."

As a guest on The Dan Patrick Show on September 8, 2010, Joe Montana, who was an active member of the team when Ruettiger played in the Georgia Tech game, confirmed that the jersey scene never happened, stating: "It's a movie, remember. Not all of that is true... The crowd wasn't chanting. Nobody threw in their jerseys. He did get in the ball game. He got carried off after the game."

Nearly 10 years later in an interview on Barstool Sports' Pardon My Take podcast hosted by Dan Katz and PFT Commenter, Montana reiterated that the jersey scene and crowd chanting did not actually occur. He also implied that carrying Ruettiger off the field was sarcastic rather than celebratory, saying: "Was there a lot of things that happened? Yeah. He got in, he got a sack. Was the crowd chanting? No. Did I throw in my jersey? No. Did he get carried off the field? He got carried off by three of the biggest pranksters on the team."

== Reception ==
The film was shown at the closing night gala of the 1993 Toronto International Film Festival.

Rudy received primarily positive reviews from critics. Roger Ebert of the Chicago Sun-Times wrote that the film "has a freshness and an earnestness that gets us involved, and by the end of the film we accept Rudy's dream as more than simply sports sentiment. It's a small but powerful illustration of the human spirit." Stephen Holden of The New York Times observed that "For all its patness, the movie also has a gritty realism that is not found in many higher-priced versions of the same thing, and its happy ending is not the typical Hollywood leap into fantasy." In The Washington Post, Richard Harrington called Rudy "a sweet-natured family drama in which years of effort are rewarded by a brief moment of glory." Kenneth Turan of the Los Angeles Times called the film "Sweet-natured and unsurprising...this is one of those Never Say Die, I Gotta Be Me, Somebody Up There Likes Me sports movies that no amount of cynicism can make much of a dent in."

On Rotten Tomatoes, the film holds a rating of 81%, based on 49 reviews. The site's consensus reads, "Though undeniably sentimental and predictable, Rudy succeeds with an uplifting spirit and determination." Metacritic gave the film a score of 71, based on 22 reviews, indicating "generally favorable reviews". Audiences polled by CinemaScore gave the film an average grade of "A" on an A+ to F scale.

In 2006, AFI placed the film on its 100 Years...100 Cheers list, where it was ranked #54.

NBA legend Kobe Bryant was a huge fan of Rudy, saying that the film "motivated him to work harder then he ever had before". After seeing it in theaters in 1993, Bryant mentioned that he'd seen it "a hundred" times on tape.

== Home media ==
Rudy was released on VHS by Columbia TriStar Home Video on May 25, 1994, and on LaserDisc on June 22, 1994. The film was released as a Special Edition DVD on September 26, 2000. The film was released on Blu-Ray for the first time on September 9, 2008. A 30th Anniversary SteelBook 4K Ultra HD Blu-ray that included a new director's cut, deleted scenes, and director's/writer's commentary, was released on November 14, 2023.

== See also ==
- List of American football films
