= List of Notre Dame Fighting Irish head football coaches =

The Notre Dame Fighting Irish football program is the college football team of the University of Notre Dame, located in South Bend, Indiana. The team competes as an Independent at the NCAA Division I Football Bowl Subdivision level. Notre Dame has produced more All-Americans than any other Football Bowl Subdivision school. Additionally, seven Fighting Irish football players have won the Heisman Trophy. Since 2015 the position has been endowed by the Corbett Family, with the full title being the Dick Corbett Head Football Coach. Notre Dame is one of only two Catholic universities that field a team in the Football Bowl Subdivision, the other being Boston College, and one of a handful of programs independent of a football conference. The team plays its home games on Notre Dame's campus at Notre Dame Stadium, also known as the "House that Rockne Built", which has a capacity of 80,795.

== Coaches ==
| # | Tenure | Coach | Years | Record | Pct. | National titles (consensus & shared) |
|---|---|---|---|---|---|---|
| 0 | 1887–89, 92–93 | None | 5 | 7–4–1 | .625 |
| 1 | 1894 | James L. Morrison | 1 | 3–1–1 | .700 |
| 2 | 1895 | H. G. Hadden | 1 | 3–1–0 | .750 |
| 3 | 1896–98 | Frank E. Hering | 3 | 12–6–1 | .658 |
| 4 | 1899 | James McWeeney | 1 | 6–3–1 | .650 |
| 5 | 1900–01 | Pat O'Dea | 2 | 14–4–2 | .750 |
| 6 | 1902–03 | James F. Faragher | 2 | 14–2–2 | .843 |
| 7 | 1904 | Red Salmon | 1 | 5–3–0 | .625 |
| 8 | 1905 | Henry J. McGlew | 1 | 5–4–0 | .556 |
| 9 | 1906–07 | Thomas A. Barry | 2 | 12–1–1 | .893 |
| 10 | 1908 | Victor M. Place | 1 | 8–1–0 | .889 |
| 11 | 1909–10 | Frank Longman | 2 | 11–1–2 | .857 |
| 12 | 1911–12 | John L. Marks | 2 | 13–0–2 | .933 |
| 13 | 1913–17 | Jesse Harper | 5 | 34–5–1 | .863 |
| 14 | 1918–30 | Knute Rockne | 13 | 105–12–5 | .881 | 1924, 1929, 1930 |
| 15 | 1931–33 | Hunk Anderson | 3 | 16–9–2 | .630 |
| 16 | 1934–40 | Elmer Layden | 7 | 47–13–3 | .770 |
| 17 | 1941–43, 46–53 | Frank Leahy | 11 | 87–11–9 | .855 | 1943, 1946, 1947, 1949 |
| 18 | 1944 | Edward McKeever | 1 | 8–2–0 | .800 |
| 19 | 1945, 63 | Hugh Devore | 2 | 9–9–1 | .500 |
| 20 | 1954–58 | Terry Brennan | 5 | 32–18–0 | .640 |
| 21 | 1959–62 | Joe Kuharich | 4 | 17–23–0 | .425 |
| 22 | 1964–74 | Ara Parseghian | 11 | 95–17–4 | .836 | 1966, 1973 |
| 23 | 1975–80 | Dan Devine | 6 | 53–16–1 | .764 | 1977 |
| 24 | 1981–85 | Gerry Faust | 5 | 30–26–1 | .535 |
| 25 | 1986–96 | Lou Holtz | 11 | 100–30–2 | .765 | 1988 |
| 26 | 1997–2001 | Bob Davie | 5 | 35–25 | .583 |
| | 2001* | George O'Leary | 0 | 0–0 | .000 |
| 27 | 2002–2004 | Tyrone Willingham | 3 | 21–15 | .583 |
| Interim | 2004** | Kent Baer | 1 | 0–1 | .000 |
| 28 | 2005–2009 | Charlie Weis | 5 | 35–27 | .565 |
| 29 | 2010–2021 | Brian Kelly | 12 | 113***–40 | .739 |
| 30 | 2021–present | Marcus Freeman | 4 | 43-12 | .769 |
| Totals | 31 coaches | 133 seasons | 921–331–42 | .728 |
* George O'Leary did not coach a single practice or game, being fired five days after being hired; he had misrepresented his academic credentials.
| ** Kent Baer served as interim head coach for one game at the 2004 Insight Bowl, after Tyrone Willingham was fired. | | | | | *** Does not account for vacated wins. |
