= Maurice Stovall =

American football player (born 1985)

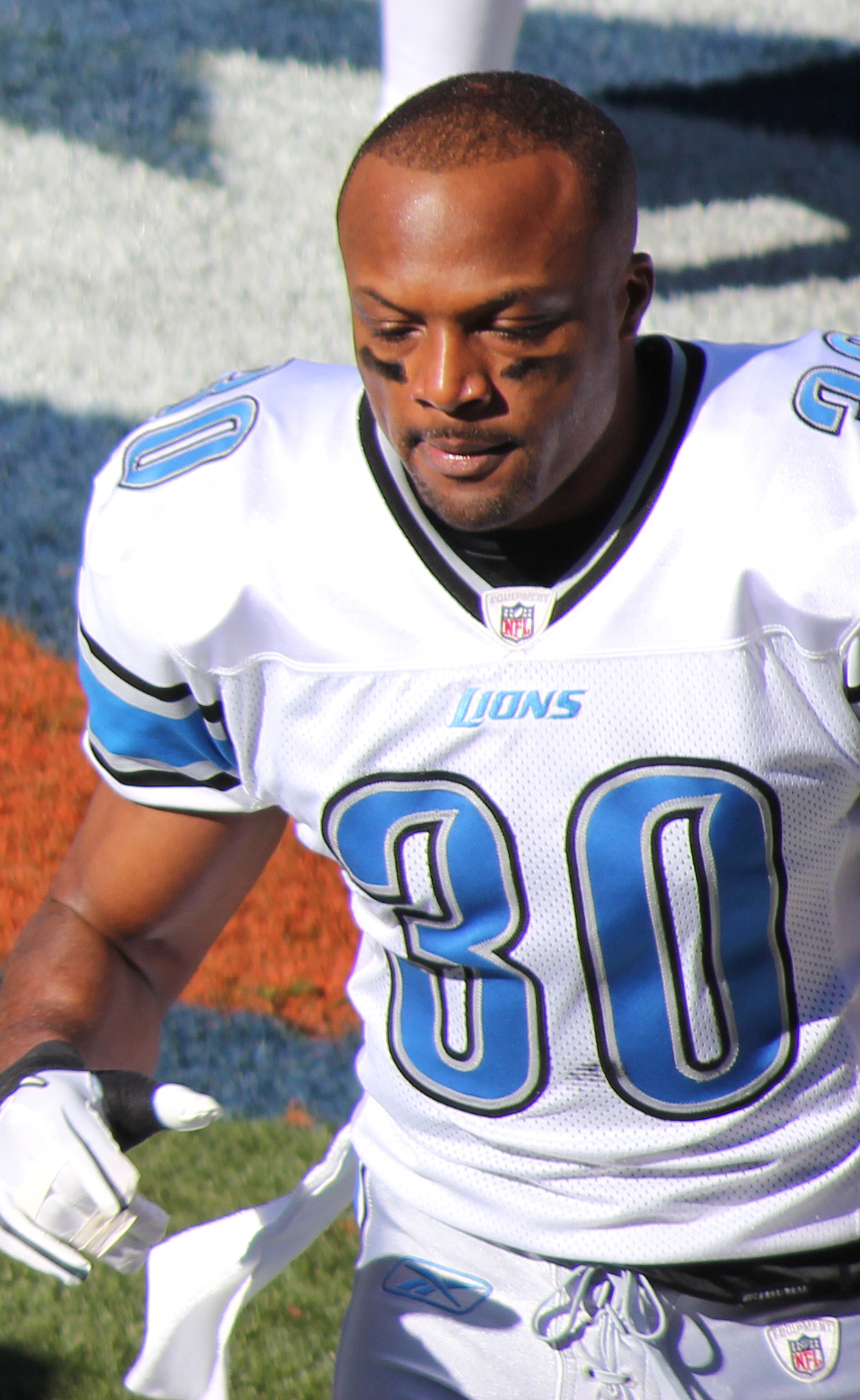
- Stovall with the Detroit Lions in 2011

No. 80, 83, 85
- Positions: Wide receiver, tight end

Personal information
- Born: February 21, 1985 (age 41); Philadelphia, Pennsylvania, U.S.
- Listed height: 6 ft 5 in (1.96 m)
- Listed weight: 220 lb (100 kg)

Career information
- High school: Archbishop John Carroll (Radnor, Pennsylvania)
- College: Notre Dame
- NFL draft: 2006: 3rd round, 90th overall pick

Career history
- Tampa Bay Buccaneers (2006–2010); Detroit Lions (2011); Jacksonville Jaguars (2012)

Career NFL statistics
- Receptions: 52
- Receiving yards: 668
- Receiving touchdowns: 3
- Stats at Pro Football Reference

Maurice Aurilius Stovall (born February 21, 1985) is an American former professional football player who was a wide receiver and tight end in the National Football League (NFL). He was selected by the Tampa Bay Buccaneers in the third round of the 2006 NFL draft. He played college football for the Notre Dame Fighting Irish.

He was also a member of the Detroit Lions and Jacksonville Jaguars.

== Early life ==
Stovall grew up in Philadelphia, Pennsylvania, and went to Archbishop John Carroll High School. Following his high school career, he played in the 2002 U.S. Army All-American Bowl.

== College career ==
After being chosen to USA Today's first-team high school All-American list, Stovall chose to attend the University of Notre Dame. He did not start as a freshman, but played in all 13 games that season, finishing the year with 18 catches including three touchdown receptions. He was also featured on the cover of Sports Illustrated early that year. He played in every game in 2003 as well, with slightly improved statistics. However, during that year as well as 2004, Stovall was remembered more for frequently dropping potential catches rather than the plays he made. This was noted not just by fans, but also by head coach Tyrone Willingham, who benched him for three games mid-season in 2004. That year, Stovall only had one touchdown catch, and many wondered if his career would be finished after his senior season.

When Charlie Weis became Notre Dame's coach prior to the 2005 season, he sought to get Stovall back to his freshman year form. This included asking the receiver to shed about 15 pounds in the offseason. After cutting his weight to about 220, Stovall became a major player in Weis' pro-style offense. Starting every game, Stovall caught 11 touchdowns, some of them requiring acrobatics, and nearly broke Tom Gatewood's school record for single-season receiving yards. He did set new records that season for single-game receptions (14) and touchdowns (4) against BYU. After this breakout senior season, Stovall was predicted to be drafted somewhere in the 2nd to 4th rounds.

== Professional career ==
Pre-draft measurables
Height	Weight	Arm length	Hand span	40-yard dash	10-yard split	20-yard split	20-yard shuttle	Three-cone drill	Vertical jump	Broad jump
6 ft 4 3/8 in (1.94 m)	217 lb (98 kg)	33 3/4 in (0.86 m)	9 5/8 in (0.24 m)	4.55 s	1.62 s	2.68 s	4.14 s	6.81 s	35.0 in (0.89 m)	10 ft 4 in (3.15 m)
All values from NFL Combine/Pro Day

=== Tampa Bay Buccaneers ===
Stovall was selected by the Tampa Bay Buccaneers in the third round of the 2006 NFL draft. A deeply religious man, he made the sign of the cross as he hauled in his first career touchdown pass against the Detroit Lions in week 7 of the 2007 NFL season. He is a competent and accomplished gunner on special teams. His former head coach Jon Gruden gave him the nickname "Gunner Stovall". In 2009, he had a career year, catching 24 passes for 366 yards in seven starts. He scored a 38-yard touchdown against the Dolphins.

=== Detroit Lions ===
On August 1, 2011, Stovall signed with the Detroit Lions.

On June 5, 2012, Stovall returned to the Lions signing a one-year deal. On August 31, 2012, Stovall was officially cut by the organization.

=== Jacksonville Jaguars ===
Stovall was signed by the Jacksonville Jaguars on September 19, 2012. He was waived on December 4, 2012.

== Coaching career ==
In 2016, Stovall joined the IMG Academy football team as their wide receivers coach.
