= John Scully (American football) =

American football player (born 1958)

No. 61
- Positions: Guard, center

Personal information
- Born: August 2, 1958 (age 68); Huntington, New York, U.S.
- Listed height: 6 ft 6 in (1.98 m)
- Listed weight: 262 lb (119 kg)

Career information
- High school: Holy Family (Huntington)
- College: Notre Dame
- NFL draft: 1981: 4th round, 109th overall pick

Career history
- Atlanta Falcons (1981–1990)

Awards and highlights
- PFWA All-Rookie Team (1981); Unanimous All-American (1980)

Career NFL statistics
- Games played: 112
- Games started: 82
- Fumble recoveries: 3
- Stats at Pro Football Reference

John Francis Scully Jr. (born August 2, 1958) is an American former professional football player who was a guard for 10 seasons in the National Football League (NFL) from 1981 to 1990. Scully played college football for the Notre Dame Fighting Irish, earning unanimous All-American honors in 1980. He played for the NFL's Atlanta Falcons for his entire pro career.

== Early life ==
Scully was born in Massapequa, New York, where he went to Holy Family High School.

== College career ==
Scully attended the University of Notre Dame, where he played for the Notre Dame Fighting Irish football team from 1977 to 1980. As a senior in 1980, he was a team captain and was recognized as a consensus first-team All-American as the team's center. He is the writer of the popular Notre Dame anthem "Here Come the Irish."

== Professional career ==
The Atlanta Falcons chose Scully in the fourth round (109th pick overall) of the 1981 NFL draft, and he played for the Falcons from 1981 to 1990. In his ten-year NFL career, he played in 112 games and started eighty-two of them.

In 1989, Scully played piano and sung Bruce Springsteen's Meeting Across The River, a rather obscure track off the Born To Run album, in a Super Bowl XXIII NFL players Talent Showcase. The event was telecast live on national television prior to game (where San Francisco beat Cincinnati, 20–16).

In 1991, Scully was cut from the Falcons roster shortly after undergoing radical surgery on his right leg.
