= Joe Yonto =

American football player and coach (1925–2008)

Biographical details
- Born: August 2, 1925; Orrville, Ohio, U.S.
- Died: August 4, 2008 (aged 83); South Bend, Indiana, U.S.

Playing career
- 1945–1947: Notre Dame
- Positions: Fullback, Guard

Coaching career (HC unless noted)
- 1964–1977: Notre Dame (DL)
- 1978–1980: Notre Dame (DC/DL)
- 1986–1987: Notre Dame (DL)

Administrative career (AD unless noted)
- 1981–1985: Notre Dame (Asst. to the AD)
- 1988–1991: Notre Dame (Asst. to the AD)

Joseph F. Yonto (August 2, 1925 – August 4, 2008) was an American football player and coach, serving most of his career at the University of Notre Dame. He served under three national championship coaches (Ara Parseghian, Dan Devine and Lou Holtz) during his career.

A native of Orrville, Ohio, Yonto played fullback as sophomore (1945) and guard as junior (1946) under coach Frank Leahy at Notre Dame. As a senior prior to his 1948 graduation, he served as an assistant freshman team coach after a leg injury ended his playing career. He went on to coach high school football for 16 years at numerous schools, including seven years at Notre Dame High School for Boys in Niles, Illinois.

In 1964 he returned to the University of Notre Dame as defensive line coach under incoming head coach Parseghian, and held that role throughout Parseghian's 11 seasons, as well as six more (1975–80) under Devine, the last four as defensive coordinator. During that period, he was a part of three Notre Dame national championship staffs (1966, 1973 and 1977) and he coached a dozen All-America defensive linemen. That list included Alan Page, Kevin Hardy, Mike McCoy, Walt Patulski, Mike Kadish, Mike Fanning, Steve Niehaus and Ross Browner—all of whom went on to be selected in the first round of the NFL draft. Browner won the Lombardi, Outland and Maxwell Awards, and Patulski also won the Lombardi.

On 12 occasions, Yonto′s defensive line ranked among the top 10 teams in the country in terms of rushing defense. Eight of those Irish teams gave up less than 100 rushing yards per game, and the 1974 Notre Dame Fighting Irish ranked first nationally in both rushing defense and total defense (195.2 yards per game). During the Gerry Faust years (1981–85), Yonto served as a special assistant to athletic director Gene Corrigan while handling administrative duties in a wide variety of football areas. Then, he returned to serve as defensive line coach in 1986 and 1987 under Lou Holtz.

Yonto spent three more years as a special assistant to athletic director Dick Rosenthal from 1988 to 1991. After his retirement, Yonto represented the University and athletics department at a variety of events.
