= Jim Stone (American football) =

American football player (born 1958)

Jim Stone (born November 18, 1958) is an American former professional football running back in the United States Football League (USFL) who played for the Chicago Blitz. He played college football for the Notre Dame Fighting Irish.
