= Bob Crable =

American football player (born 1959)

No. 50
- Position: Linebacker

Personal information
- Born: September 22, 1959 (age 67); Cincinnati, Ohio, U.S.
- Listed height: 6 ft 3 in (1.91 m)
- Listed weight: 228 lb (103 kg)

Career information
- High school: Archbishop Moeller (Cincinnati, Ohio)
- College: Notre Dame
- NFL draft: 1982: 1st round, 23rd overall pick

Career history
- New York Jets (1982–1988)

Awards and highlights
- 2× consensus All-American (1980, 1981); Third-team All-American (1979)

Career NFL statistics
- Sacks: 10
- Fumble recoveries: 4
- Interceptions: 3
- Stats at Pro Football Reference
- College Football Hall of Fame

Robert Edward Crable (born September 22, 1959) is an American former professional football player who was a linebacker in the National Football League (NFL) for six seasons during the 1980s. He played college football for the University of Notre Dame, and twice earned consensus All-American honors. A first-round pick in the 1982 NFL draft, he played professionally for the NFL's New York Jets.

== Early life ==
Crable was born in Cincinnati, Ohio, and grew up in nearby Deer Park, a Cincinnati suburb. He attended Archbishop Moeller High School, and compiled an accomplished high school football career. His Moeller high school teams won three consecutive football state championships and compiled a three-season record of 36–0.

== College career ==
Crable attended the University of Notre Dame, where he pursued a degree in business administration and marketing. He played for coach Dan Devine and coach Gerry Faust's Notre Dame Fighting Irish football teams from 1978 to 1981, and he was selected as team captain his junior and senior seasons. He was recognized as a consensus first-team All-American in both 1980 and 1981, while compiling the following statistical records: 521 career tackles—still a Notre Dame record; most tackles in a season (187 in 1979) and a game (26 vs. Clemson in 1979), and his 26 tackles also ties an NCAA single-game record.

== Professional career ==
After graduating from Notre Dame, Crable was selected in the first round (23rd pick) of the 1982 NFL Draft by the New York Jets. He played linebacker with the Jets for seven years. After sustaining two knee injuries that ended his professional football career, he returned to Cincinnati. He began his own business—Crable Sportswear—while playing for the Jets, until his top-of-the-line sportswear company was purchased by The Midland Company in 1989, and Crable retained the position of company president.

== Life after the NFL ==
Crable then returned to his high school alma mater, Moeller High School, during the 1992–93 school year as a coach and part-time religion teacher. The next year, he accepted a full-time teaching position in the religion department. He became certified to teach religion by the Archdiocese of Cincinnati after attending The Athenaeum of Ohio. He was named the head football coach of Moeller High School and coached for eight seasons from 2000 to 2007. Crable now owns and operates Hilltop Management Company serving the greater Cincinnati area. Crable, a two-time consensus All-American linebacker at Notre Dame, was named to the National Football Foundation's College Football Hall of Fame Class of 2017.
