= Phil Carter (Canadian football) =

American gridiron football player (born 1959)

Phillip Carter (born August 31, 1959) is a former Canadian football running back in the Canadian Football League who played for the Calgary Stampeders. He played college football for the Notre Dame Fighting Irish.
