= Louis J. Salmon =

American football player and coach (1880–1965)

Biographical details
- Born: January 26, 1880; Syracuse, New York, U.S.
- Died: September 27, 1965 (aged 85); Liberty, New York, U.S.

Playing career
- 1900–1903: Notre Dame,
- Position: Fullback

Coaching career (HC unless noted)
- 1904: Notre Dame

Head coaching record
- Overall: 5–3

Accomplishments and honors

Awards
- Third-team All-American (1903); First-team All-Western (1903)
- College Football Hall of Fame; Inducted in 1971 (profile)

Louis John "Red" Salmon (January 26, 1880 – September 27, 1965) was an America college football player and coach. He is considered to be the first outstanding fullback to play at the University of Notre Dame. He was the first "Fighting Irish" player to win an All-American mention, and some sports historians argue that he served as the team's de facto coach during the 1902–1903 season. This honor, however, is often accorded to teammate James Farragher. Both men are widely credited as acting head coaches in official histories of the "Fighting Irish" football team, and Salmon is recognized as head coach during the 1904 season.

== Playing career ==
Born in Syracuse, New York, Salmon made his mark in collegiate football in 1903, when (as a senior) he scored 105 points. His career record of 36 touchdowns remained a school standard until 1985. At six feet and three inches, and 230 pounds, Salmon was a force to be reckoned with on the gridiron. As one writer observed: "The alabaster-skinned Salmon has been described as both a slasher and a smasher, a colorful way of saying he would run right over you if he could not run around you". Moreover, in an era when a wet pigskin might weigh as much as 14 pounds, Salmon averaged 30 yards with his punts. In 1903, Salmon was named to Walter Camp's third All-America team.

== Coaching career and legacy ==
During the 1903–1904 season, Salmon served officially as head coach of the "Fighting Irish". He presided over a lackluster season of 5–4, and as one writer has commented, "The team needed Salmon on the field, not on the sidelines". After graduating with a degree in engineering, the former sports hero rarely returned to campus and underplayed his outstanding athletic career. Nevertheless, he would be remembered as one of collegiate football's "greats". Louis "Red Salmon was inducted into the College Football Hall of Fame in 1971.

== Head coaching record ==
Year	Team	Overall	Conference	Standing	Bowl/playoffs
Notre Dame (Independent) (1904)
1904	Notre Dame	5–3			
Notre Dame:		5–3			
Total:		5–3			

== Sources ==
- Sperber, Murray (1993). Shake Down the Thunder: The Creation of Notre Dame Football. New York: Henry Holt and Company. ISBN 978-0-253-21568-0.
