= List of Cal Poly Mustangs in the NFL draft =

This is a list of Cal Poly Mustangs football players in the NFL draft.

== Key ==
B	Back	K	Kicker	NT	Nose tackle
C	Center	LB	Linebacker	FB	Fullback
DB	Defensive back	P	Punter	HB	Halfback
DE	Defensive end	QB	Quarterback	WR	Wide receiver
DT	Defensive tackle	RB	Running back	G	Guard
E	End	T	Offensive tackle	TE	Tight end

== Selections ==
Year	Round	Pick	Overall	Player	Team	Position
1954	9	9	106	Alex Bravo	Los Angeles Rams	DB
1954	9	12	109	Bob Lawson	Detroit Lions	B
1954	18	9	214	Stan Sheriff	Los Angeles Rams	C
1955	24	8	285	Bob Heaston	San Francisco 49ers	G
1955	26	10	311	Perry Jeter	Chicago Bears	B
1956	9	2	99	Jim Cox	San Francisco 49ers	E
1958	21	3	244	John Madden	Philadelphia Eagles	T
1967	2	22	48	Bob Howard	San Diego Chargers	DB
1968	5	16	127	Cecil Turner	Chicago Bears	WR
1970	12	19	305	Emanuel Murrell	Detroit Lions	DB
1972	12	3	289	Fredrick Wegis	Cincinnati Bengals	DB
1976	6	18	174	Gary Davis	Miami Dolphins	RB
1976	14	11	386	John Henson	Green Bay Packers	RB
1976	17	8	467	Ray Hall	Green Bay Packers	TE
1978	4	13	97	Jim Childs	St. Louis Cardinals	WR
1978	8	20	214	Andre Keys	Pittsburgh Steelers	WR
1981	4	17	100	Robbie Martin	Pittsburgh Steelers	WR
1981	7	2	168	Louis Jackson	New York Giants	RB
1981	7	13	179	Michael Daum	Miami Dolphins	T
1982	6	26	165	Charles Daum	Dallas Cowboys	DT
1984	8	12	208	Paul Sverchek	Minnesota Vikings	DT
1985	6	22	162	Damone Johnson	Los Angeles Rams	TE
1985	9	21	245	Gary Swanson	Los Angeles Rams	LB
1986	12	23	328	Sal Cesario	New York Jets	T
1989	9	6	229	Chris Dunn	Atlanta Falcons	LB
1989	11	18	297	Joe Nelms	Chicago Bears	DT
1996	3	20	81	Brian Roche	San Diego Chargers	TE
1998	7	49	238	Kamil Loud	Buffalo Bills	WR
2002	7	5	216	Seth Burford	San Diego Chargers	QB
2005	3	26	90	Jordan Beck	Atlanta Falcons	LB
2006	3	7	71	Chris Gocong	Philadelphia Eagles	DE
2007	7	2	212	Courtney Brown	Dallas Cowboys	DB
2009	3	21	85	Ramses Barden	New York Giants	WR
2012	5	34	169	Asa Jackson	Baltimore Ravens	DB
