= Louis Jackson =

Louis Jackson may refer to:

- Louis Jackson (American football), American footballer (born 1958)
- Louis Jackson (footballer, born 2005), Scottish footballer (born 2005)
- Louis H. Jackson, British film producer (1904–1948)

== See also ==
- Lois Jackson
