= Mustang Band =

Mustang Band may refer to:

- The Southern Methodist University Mustang Band
- The California Polytechnic State University Mustang Band
- The Western Mustang Band, marching band for the University of Western Ontario
- The Mustangs, a British rock band
- Los Mustang, a Spanish rock band)
