= Chris Coleman (wide receiver, born 1999) =

American football player (born 1999)

Profile
- Position: Wide receiver

Personal information
- Born: April 3, 1999 (age 27); Bakersfield, California, U.S.
- Listed height: 5 ft 11 in (1.80 m)
- Listed weight: 192 lb (87 kg)

Career information
- High school: Bakersfield (CA) Garces Memorial
- College: Fresno State (2017–2020); Cal Poly (2021–2022)
- NFL draft: 2023: undrafted

Career history
- Miami Dolphins (2023)*; Hamilton Tiger-Cats (2023)*
- * Offseason or practice squad member only
- Stats at Pro Football Reference

Chris Coleman (born April 3, 1999) is an American professional football wide receiver. He played college football at Fresno State and Cal Poly.

== Early life ==
Coleman graduated from Garces Memorial High in Bakersfield, where he earned Bakersfield Californian All-Area Football First Team honors. He is the cousin of two-time NFL champion Brandon Browner.

== College career ==
Coming out of high school, Coleman committed to Fresno State, picking the Bulldogs over an offer from Montana State. After the COVID-19 pandemic, he transferred to Cal Poly with two seasons of NCAA eligibility remaining. Following his senior season of 2022, Coleman was named as an honorable mention in All-Big Sky Conference accolades.

== Professional career ==
=== Miami Dolphins ===
Coleman signed an undrafted free-agent contract with the Miami Dolphins in late April 2023. He was waived on August 28, 2023.

=== Hamilton Tiger-Cats ===
On September 26, 2023, the Tiger-Cats announced they had signed Coleman to the practice roster. He was released on June 1, 2024.
