= Ramses Barden =

American football player (born 1986)

No. 13
- Position: Wide receiver

Personal information
- Born: January 1, 1986 (age 40); Altadena, California, U.S.
- Listed height: 6 ft 6 in (1.98 m)
- Listed weight: 224 lb (102 kg)

Career information
- High school: La Cañada Flintridge (CA) Flintridge Prep
- College: Cal Poly
- NFL draft: 2009: 3rd round, 85th overall pick

Career history
- New York Giants (2009–2012); Buffalo Bills (2014)*; Jacksonville Jaguars (2014)*
- * Offseason or practice squad member only

Awards and highlights
- Super Bowl champion (XLVI); 2x FCS First Team All-American (2007, 2008); 2x Walter Payton Award candidate (2007, 2008); 2x Great West Conference Offensive Player of the Year (2007/co, 2008); All-Time Great West Conference Team selection

Career NFL statistics
- Receptions: 29
- Receiving yards: 394
- Stats at Pro Football Reference

Ramses Alexander Barden (born January 1, 1986) is an American former professional football player who was a wide receiver in the National Football League (NFL). He played college football for the Cal Poly Mustangs and was selected by the New York Giants in the third round of the 2009 NFL draft. Against the New England Patriots, Barden won Super Bowl XLVI with the Giants.

== Early life ==
Barden was born in Altadena, California. He played high school football at Flintridge Preparatory School in La Canada Flintridge, California. The three-time all-league selection caught 41 passes for 915 yards and 14 touchdowns as a senior, while also playing free safety. As well as playing football, Barden averaged 17 points per game in basketball and competed also in volleyball and track and field. He was also named small schools High School Athlete of the Year, while being pursued by UPenn, Stanford, San Diego, and Cal Poly. Barden ultimately signed with the Cal Poly Mustangs.

== Collegiate career ==
=== Freshman season ===
Barden arrived at Cal Poly in 2004, but redshirted his true freshman season. In 2005 as a redshirt freshman, Barden led the Mustangs with 40 receptions for 655 yards and 9 touchdowns en route to being named a first-team All-Great West Conference selection. In the game against Southern Utah, Barden caught a career-high 9 receptions, while blocking two field goal attempts in games against South Dakota State and North Dakota State.

=== Sophomore season ===
As a sophomore in 2006, Barden again led Cal Poly with 42 receptions for 824 yards and 5 touchdowns while being named a first-team All-Great West selection for the second-straight season. In the September matchup against Sacramento State, Barden earned Great West Conference Player of the Week honors with his 9-reception, 200-yard and 2-touchdown performance. In the following game against San Jose State, he had 7 catches for 110 yards and a score. Barden's 824 receiving yards placed 11th on the all-time school single-season list, while he was named a College Sporting All-American.

=== Junior season ===
As a junior in 2007, Barden made the All-Great West First Team and was named the Great West Co-Offensive Player of the Year. He had 57 receptions for 1,467 yards and 18 touchdowns. In a 48–28 win over Idaho State, he had 10 catches for a career-high 268 yards, and 3 touchdowns. Following the year, he finished 15th in the Walter Payton Award voting, collecting 30 points, including one first-place ballot.

=== Senior season ===
As a senior in 2008, Barden matched his junior-year mark of 18 touchdowns and improved his reception total with 67. He had 1,257 yards receiving. Midway through the season, a Cal Poly student began printing T-shirts stating "Throw it to Ramses" which became sought-after items in the student section at Spanos Stadium. During a Battle for the Golden Horseshoe and GWFC title-winning victory over rival UC Davis on November 15, Barden broke Jerry Rice's previous division record of 17 consecutive games having scored on a reception. Barden finished his Cal Poly career with 206 receptions, 4,203 yards, and 50 touchdowns. In his last game at Cal Poly, he had 108 yards and two touchdowns in a 49–35 loss to Weber State in the first round of the FCS playoffs. After the year, Barden finished fourth in the Payton Award voting, gathering 127 total points in the balloting, including four first-place votes.

=== College statistics ===
Year	Team	G	GS	Rec	Yards	AVG	TD
2005	CP	13	13	40	655	16.4	9
2006	CP	11	11	42	824	19.6	5
2007	CP	11	11	57	1,467	25.7	18
2008	CP	11	11	67	1,257	18.8	18
Totals		46	46	206	4,203	20.4	50

=== NCAA records ===
- As of March 2023, Barden still held the all-time FCS record for most consecutive career games with a touchdown catch: 20

== Professional career ==
"I think my size will give me an advantage in getting off the line of scrimmage and competing for the ball. And with this game being physical (it'll help) when the ball is in the air, enabling me to make plays."

— Ramses Barden, 2009

=== Pre-draft ===
At the NFL Combine, Barden measured in at 6-foot-6.5 tall and 225 pounds. He timed at 4.61 seconds in the 40-yard dash, lifted 17 reps on the bench press, recorded a 33.5" vertical jump, and a 9' 10" broad jump. He was also the tallest receiver in the draft class.

=== New York Giants ===
In the 2009 NFL draft, the Giants moved up six spots in the third round of the draft to select Barden. The move up cost the Giants their own third-round pick (91st overall) and one of their two fifth-rounders (164th), which they sent to their division rivals, the Philadelphia Eagles. He saw little playing time in his rookie season, participating in three games and recording 1 catch for 16 yards. In his second season, he had 5 catches for 64 yards in three games before being placed on injured reserve on November 16, 2010, after breaking his ankle and suffering ligament damage. Placed on the Active/Physically-Unable-To-Perform List on July 29, 2011, he returned to action on November 6, 2011, catching 2 passes for 24 yards in a win against the New England Patriots.

Barden caught an 11-yard touchdown pass during the first half of New York's preseason game against Chicago on August 24, 2012. On September 20, 2012, vs. the Carolina Panthers, with Hakeem Nicks out with a foot injury, Barden had a breakout performance, with 9 catches for 138 yards. In 2013 Barden was re-signed during the Giants' training camp, although he was released shortly before the regular season began on August 31.

=== Buffalo Bills ===
After sitting out the entire 2013 NFL season, Barden signed with the Buffalo Bills on January 16, 2014. He was released on July 21, 2014.

=== Jacksonville Jaguars ===
Barden was signed by the Jacksonville Jaguars on August 6, 2014. The Jaguars released Barden on August 24, 2014.

== Life after football ==
On July 6, 2015, Barden took part in a tryout with the Essendon Football Club. The tryout was limited to 10 minutes and Barden was not offered a contract or a second tryout after. He now works as a coach for the football team of Flintridge Preparatory School.
