= Battle for the Golden Horseshoe =

American college football rivalry

- UC Davis Cal Poly
- Sport: Football
- First meeting: November 4, 1939; Northern Branch, 28–0
- Latest meeting: November 21, 2026; UC Davis, 44–43
- Next meeting: November 6, 2027
- Trophy: The Golden Horseshoe

Statistics
- Total meetings: 52
- All-time series: UC Davis leads, 30–20–2
- Trophy series: UC Davis leads, 16–7
- Largest victory: UC Davis, 73–24 (2021)
- Longest win streak: UC Davis, 10 (2017–present)
- Current win streak: UC Davis, 10 (2017–present)

Locations of Cal Poly and UC Davis

The Battle for the Golden Horseshoe is an annual rivalry college football game played between the UC Davis Aggies and the Cal Poly Mustangs.

== History ==
Although the two teams have met on the gridiron since 1939, the rivalry officially began in name with the 2004 game at Cal Poly. The winner of the game receives the Golden Horseshoe Trophy, which was also created in 2004 for the inaugural game.

Due to a misunderstanding, both schools constructed a trophy for the rivalry and brought it to the inaugural game. The teams decided that the rivalry would adopt the trophy created by the winner of that game; UC Davis won 36–33 and was therefore allowed to make its trophy the official one to be exchanged in all subsequent meetings.

UC Davis won the trophy in 2004, 2005, 2009, 2010, 2011, 2014, 2017, 2018, 2019, March 2021, October 2021, 2022, 2023, 2024, 2025, and 2026 while Cal Poly took it in 2006, 2007, 2008, 2012, 2013, 2015 and 2016. UC Davis leads the all-time series 30–20–2.

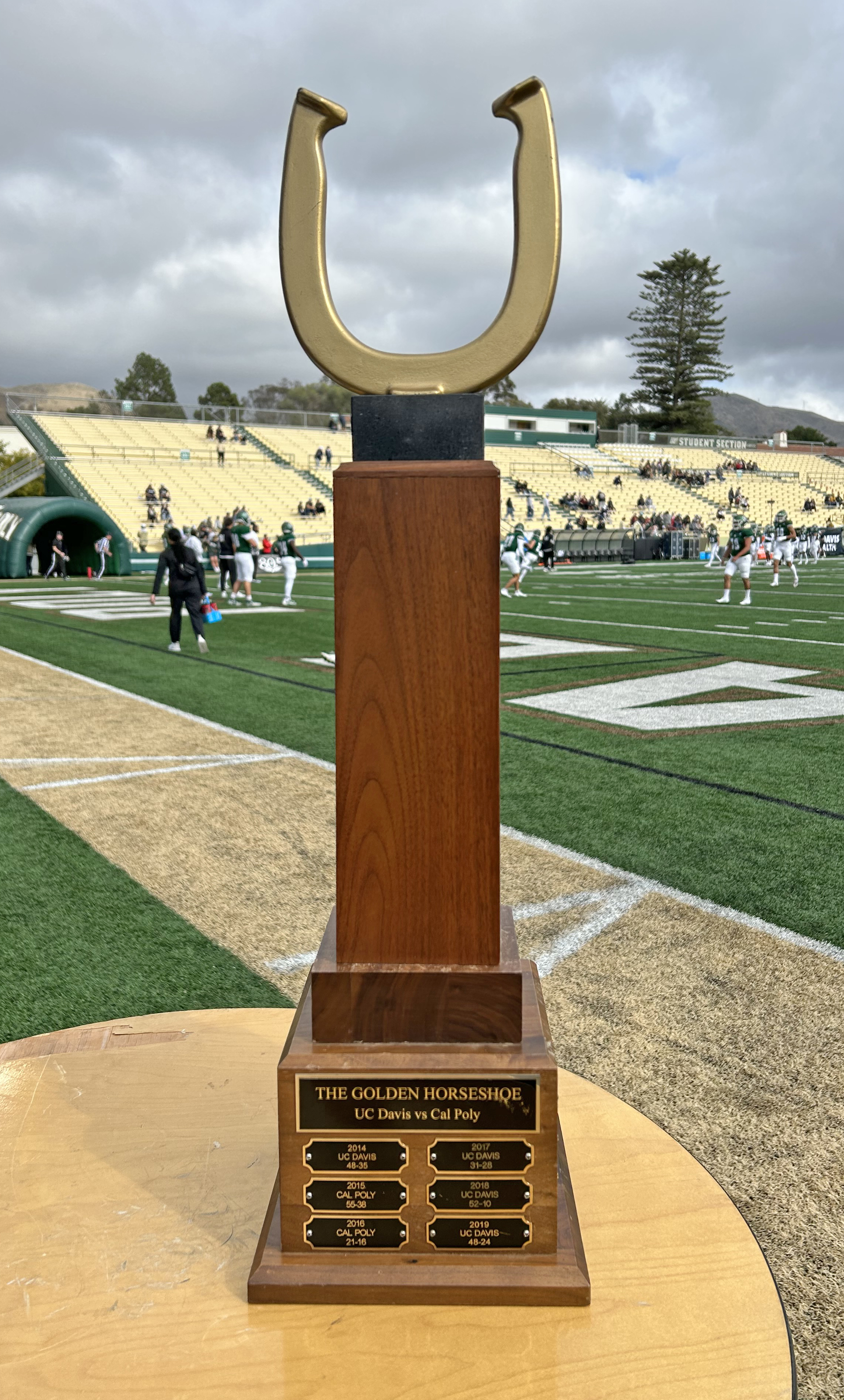
The present-day Battle for the Golden Horseshoe trophy is shown in San Luis Obispo, California in 2023 before the annual college football rivalry game

There is also controversy regarding the addition of gems to the trophy after each win. The Mustang Maniacs (today known as the Stang Gang after a student vote), the student group who holds the trophy while it is under Cal Poly's control, added blue and green gems to the trophy from 2006 to 2008. But when the Aggie-Pack regained control of the trophy in 2009, they removed the gems, wishing to keep the trophy in its original condition.

Both programs are based in California, and both are primarily members of the non-football sponsoring Big West Conference, while their football teams both play within the Big Sky Conference.

Additionally, there are many key differences between the two institutions: UC Davis is located in northern California and is a member of the University of California system, while Cal Poly is located in southern California and is part of the California State University system, giving the rivalry an element of culture clash.

The initial game in 1939 in Davis was broadcast all the way back to the Central Coast via Sacramento-area radio station 1500 AM KFBK. Some 200 Cal Poly supporters, including the band, made the trip north for the first matchup between the "so-called brother institution(s)".

Upon resumption of the rivalry in 1976, the first post-World War II installment in the series was initially billed as the Aggie Bowl, given the "strong agriculture-oriented curriculums at both universities," per the San Luis Obispo Tribune.

This balance of similarities and differences has given the rivalry a basis in respect between both institutions for their academic statures as well as often recruiting the same players. After being hired by Army, former Cal Poly head coach Rich Ellerson compared the spirit of the Mustangs' rivalry with UC Davis to the rivalry between Army and Navy, commenting to the Times Herald-Record: "We had a rivalry at Cal Poly with UC Davis, and I always would try to invoke the kind of rivalry we have with Army-Navy: a rivalry that's founded on respect as opposed to disdain."

== Game results ==
Cal Poly victories	UC Davis victories	Tie games

No.	Date	Location	Winning team		Losing team	
1	November 4, 1939	Davis, CA	UC Davis	28	Cal Poly	0
2	November 16, 1940	San Luis Obispo, CA	Cal Poly	20	UC Davis	7
3	November 20, 1976	San Luis Obispo, CA	Cal Poly	26	UC Davis	14
4	November 11, 1978	Davis, CA	#6 UC Davis	29	#3 Cal Poly	22
5	September 29, 1979	San Luis Obispo, CA	Cal Poly	31	UC Davis	10
6	September 28, 1980	Davis, CA	Cal Poly	28	UC Davis	25
7	October 17, 1981	San Luis Obispo, CA	Cal Poly	30	UC Davis	0
8	October 9, 1982	Davis, CA	UC Davis	24	Cal Poly	0
9	October 8, 1983	San Luis Obispo, CA	#4 UC Davis	24	#9 Cal Poly	14
10	September 29, 1984	Davis, CA	UC Davis	10	Cal Poly	6
11	September 28, 1985	San Luis Obispo, CA	#7 UC Davis	34	Cal Poly	21
12	September 20, 1986	Davis, CA	#4 UC Davis	32	Cal Poly	21
13	October 3, 1987	San Luis Obispo, CA	#18 Cal Poly	41	#12 UC Davis	0
14	October 29, 1988	Davis, CA	Tie	21	Tie	21
15	October 28, 1989	San Luis Obispo, CA	Cal Poly	28	#12 UC Davis	21
16	October 6, 1990	Davis, CA	Cal Poly	19	UC Davis	0
17	September 14, 1991	San Luis Obispo, CA	UC Davis	31	#17 Cal Poly	28
18	October 10, 1992	Davis, CA	Tie	31	Tie	31
19	September 11, 1993	Davis, CA	UC Davis	37	Cal Poly	26
20	October 15, 1994	San Luis Obispo, CA	Cal Poly	32	#16 UC Davis	31
21	November 11, 1995	Davis, CA	UC Davis	34	Cal Poly	31
22	November 12, 1996	San Luis Obispo, CA	Cal Poly	17	#12 UC Davis	13
23	September 6, 1997	Davis, CA	Cal Poly	20	#7 UC Davis	19
24	October 3, 1998	San Luis Obispo, CA	#7 UC Davis	34	Cal Poly	24
25	October 23, 1999	Davis, CA	#8 UC Davis	31	Cal Poly	24
26	October 21, 2000	San Luis Obispo, CA	#1 UC Davis	63	Cal Poly	28
27	October 20, 2001	Davis, CA	Cal Poly	31	#10 UC Davis	28

No.	Date	Location	Winning team		Losing team	
28	October 26, 2002	San Luis Obispo, CA	#5 UC Davis	28	Cal Poly	14
29	November 8, 2003	Davis, CA	Cal Poly	18	UC Davis	14
30	October 30, 2004	San Luis Obispo, CA	UC Davis	36	#11 Cal Poly	33
31	October 29, 2005	Davis, CA	UC Davis	20	#10 Cal Poly	13
32	October 7, 2006	San Luis Obispo, CA	#5 Cal Poly	23	#16 UC Davis	17
33	October 13, 2007	Davis, CA	#22 Cal Poly	63	UC Davis	28
34	November 15, 2008	San Luis Obispo, CA	#3 Cal Poly	51	UC Davis	28
35	November 6, 2009	Davis, CA	UC Davis	23	Cal Poly	10
36	November 13, 2010	San Luis Obispo, CA	UC Davis	22	#19 Cal Poly	21
37	November 5, 2011	Davis, CA	UC Davis	24	Cal Poly	17
38	September 22, 2012	San Luis Obispo, CA	Cal Poly	28	UC Davis	20
39	November 2, 2013	Davis, CA	Cal Poly	34	UC Davis	16
40	November 15, 2014	San Luis Obispo, CA	UC Davis	48	Cal Poly	35
41	November 13, 2015	Davis, CA	Cal Poly	55	UC Davis	38
42	October 22, 2016	San Luis Obispo, CA	#17 Cal Poly	21	UC Davis	16
43	October 28, 2017	Davis, CA	UC Davis	31	Cal Poly	28
44	October 20, 2018	San Luis Obispo, CA	#10 UC Davis	52	Cal Poly	10
45	October 12, 2019	Davis, CA	#24 UC Davis	48	Cal Poly	24
46	March 20, 2021	Davis, CA	#21 UC Davis	73	Cal Poly	24
47	October 23, 2021	San Luis Obispo, CA	#10 UC Davis	24	Cal Poly	13
48	October 29, 2022	Davis, CA	UC Davis	59	Cal Poly	17
49	September 30, 2023	San Luis Obispo, CA	#20 UC Davis	31	Cal Poly	13
50	October 12, 2024	Davis, CA	#6 UC Davis	56	Cal Poly	10
51	October 4, 2025	San Luis Obispo, CA	#9 UC Davis	34	Cal Poly	27
52	November 21, 2026	Davis, CA	#23 UC Davis	44	Cal Poly	43
Series: UC Davis leads 30–20–2

== See also ==
- List of NCAA college football rivalry games
