= Alli Abrew =

American gridiron football player (born 1974)

No. 10
- Position: Quarterback

Personal information
- Born: July 3, 1974 (age 52); Alameda County, California, U.S.
- Listed height: 6 ft 0 in (1.83 m)
- Listed weight: 195 lb (88 kg)

Career information
- High school: De La Salle (Concord, California)
- College: San Jose State (1993–1995); Cal Poly (1996–1997)
- NFL draft: 1998: undrafted

Career history
- Saskatchewan Roughriders (1999); Calgary Stampeders (1999)*; Tampa Bay Storm (2000)
- * Offseason or practice squad member only

Career AFL statistics
- Comp. / Att.: 1 / 3
- Passing yards: 8
- TD–INT: 0-0
- QB rating: 42.36
- Rushing TDs: 0
- Stats at ArenaFan.com

Alfred Charles Abrew (born July 3, 1974) is an American former football quarterback. He played college football for San Jose State and Cal Poly. After going undrafted in the 1999 NFL draft he signed with the Saskatchewan Roughriders of the Canadian Football League (CFL). He also played for the Calgary Stampeders of the CFL and the Tampa Bay Storm of the Arena Football League (AFL).

== Early life ==
Abrew attended De La Salle High School in Concord, California where he played with wide receiver Amani Toomer.

== College career ==
On August 21, 1994, head coach John Ralston named Abrew the starting quarterback. He would replace Jeff Garcia, who graduated that year. He started the 1994 season but was replaced in the second week by Carl Dean against USC.

Abrew transferred to Cal Poly in San Luis Obispo in 1996.

=== Statistics ===
Year	Team	Games		Passing								Rushing			
Year	Team	GP	Record	Comp	Att	Pct	Yards	Avg	TD	Int	Rate	Att	Yards	Avg	TD
1993	San Jose State	11	0–0	7	11	63.6	84	7.6	0	1	109.6	8	-30	-3.8	0
1994	San Jose State	11	3–8	135	270	50.0	1,743	6.5	10	11	108.3	77	-157	-2.0	0
1995	San Jose State	11	0–0	18	42	42.9	243	5.8	1	1	94.6	6	1	0.2	0
1996	Cal Poly	11	5–6	147	275	53.5	2,048	7.4	10	14	117.8	52	38	0.7	1
1997	Cal Poly	11	10–1	130	191	68.1	1,961	10.3	17	4	179.5	63	79	1.3	3
Career		55	18−15	437	789	55.4	6,079	7.7	38	31	128.1	206	-69	-0.3	4

== Professional career ==
In 1999, Abrew signed with the Saskatchewan Roughriders of the Canadian Football League (CFL). He played in two games.

In 1999, Abrew was also a member of the Calgary Stampeders until being released on June 28, 1999.

In 2000, Abrew was a member of the Tampa Bay Storm of the Arena Football League (AFL).
