= David Richardson (American football) =

American football player (born 1981)

No. 26, 22
- Position: Defensive back

Personal information
- Born: September 9, 1981 (age 45); Inglewood, California, U.S.
- Listed height: 6 ft 2 in (1.88 m)
- Listed weight: 205 lb (93 kg)

Career information
- High school: St. Bernard (Los Angeles)
- College: Cal Poly
- NFL draft: 2004: undrafted

Career history
- Jacksonville Jaguars (2004–2006); Los Angeles Avengers (2008); Jacksonville Sharks (2011); Philadelphia Soul (2013)

Career NFL statistics
- Games played: 13
- Tackles: 10
- Passes defended: 1
- Stats at Pro Football Reference

Career AFL statistics
- Tackles: 31
- Pass breakups: 3
- Forced fumbles: 1
- Interceptions: 1
- Stats at ArenaFan.com

David Michael Richardson (born September 9, 1981) is an American former professional football player who was a cornerback in the National Football League (NFL). He played college football for the Cal Poly Mustangs.

== College career ==
Richardson attended California Polytechnic State University, San Luis Obispo, out of St. Bernard High School, and was a letterman in football. As a Mustang senior, he won AFCA All-America honors, and started all of the team's 11 games and recorded five interceptions returned for 105 yards and two touchdowns, plus 50 tackles, seven pass deflections and a sack. As a junior, he garnered three interceptions and 57 tackles.

Late in the 2003 season, Richardson accepted an invitation to the Las Vegas All-American Classic showcase game. He was selected as Cal Poly's Male Athlete of the Year following his senior season.

== Professional career ==
=== Jacksonville Jaguars ===
Richardson signed an undrafted free-agent contract with the Jacksonville Jaguars in April 2004. He spent his first two years as a reserve cornerback, wearing jersey number 26.

After unsuccessfully competing for a starting job in 2005, he was relegated to special teams. He moved to safety during the 2006 training camp due to the team's glut of cornerbacks.

=== Los Angeles Avengers ===
Richardson signed with the Los Angeles Avengers of the Arena Football League in 2008.

=== Jacksonville Sharks ===
Richardson signed with the Jacksonville Sharks in 2011.

=== Philadelphia Soul ===
Richardson signed with the Philadelphia Soul in 2013.
