= J. J. Koski =

American football player (born 1996)

Profile
- Position: Wide receiver

Personal information
- Born: December 27, 1996 (age 29); San Ramon, California, U.S.
- Listed height: 6 ft 1 in (1.85 m)
- Listed weight: 195 lb (88 kg)

Career information
- High school: San Ramon Valley (Danville, California)
- College: Cal Poly
- NFL draft: 2020: undrafted

Career history
- Los Angeles Rams (2020–2022); Denver Broncos (2023)*
- * Offseason or practice squad member only

Awards and highlights
- Super Bowl champion (LVI); First-team All-Big Sky (2019); Third-team All-Big Sky (2018)

Career NFL statistics
- Return yards: 109
- Stats at Pro Football Reference

J. J. Koski (born December 27, 1996) is an American professional football wide receiver. He played college football at Cal Poly.

== Early life ==
Koski grew up in Danville, California and attended San Ramon Valley High School, where he played basketball and football and ran track. He caught 161 passes for 2,589 yards and 30 touchdowns during his high school career.

== College career ==
Koski was a member of the Cal Poly Mustangs for five seasons, redshirting as a true freshman. He became a starter during his redshirt sophomore season and was named third-team All-Big Sky Conference as a redshirt junior after finishing the season with 33 receptions for 666 yards and four touchdowns. As a redshirt senior he caught 42 passes for 868 yards and eight touchdowns and was named first-team All-Big Sky. Koski finished his collegiate career with 121 receptions, 2,311 yards and 18 touchdowns.

== Professional career ==
=== Los Angeles Rams ===
Koski was signed by the Los Angeles Rams as an undrafted free agent on April 25, 2020. He was waived on September 4, 2020, during final roster cuts, and was subsequently signed to the team's practice squad one day later. Koski signed a reserve/futures contract with the team on January 18, 2021. He was waived on August 31, 2021, at the end of training camp. The Rams signed Koski to their active roster on November 3, 2021. He made his NFL debut and returned one punt for seven yards in a 16–28 loss to the Tennessee Titans on November 7, 2021. Koski was later waived by the Rams on December 7 and re-signed to the practice squad. He was promoted back to the active roster on January 1, 2022. He was waived on January 4, 2022 and re-signed to the practice squad. Koski won Super Bowl LVI as a member of the Rams backup players when they defeated the Cincinnati Bengals.

On February 15, 2022, Koski signed a reserve/future contract with the Rams. He was waived/injured on August 20, 2022, and placed on injured reserve.

On March 10, 2023, Koski was waived by the Los Angeles Rams.

=== Denver Broncos ===
On August 14, 2023, Koski signed with the Denver Broncos. He was waived on August 27.
