= Jordan Beck (American football) =

American football player (born 1983)

No. 52, 57
- Position: Linebacker

Personal information
- Born: April 18, 1983 (age 43); Mount Hermon, California, U.S.
- Listed height: 6 ft 2 in (1.88 m)
- Listed weight: 233 lb (106 kg)

Career information
- High school: San Lorenzo Valley (Felton, California)
- College: Cal Poly
- NFL draft: 2005: 3rd round, 90th overall pick

Career history
- Atlanta Falcons (2005–2006); Denver Broncos (2007)

Awards and highlights
- Buck Buchanan Award (2004)

Career NFL statistics
- Total tackles: 23
- Stats at Pro Football Reference

Jordan David Beck (born April 18, 1983) is an American former professional football player who was a linebacker in the National Football League (NFL). He played college football at California Polytechnic State University, San Luis Obispo. He was selected by the Atlanta Falcons in the third round of the 2005 NFL draft. After leaving the Falcons, Beck signed with the Denver Broncos and was later released after the 2008 preseason.

== Early life ==
Beck graduated from San Lorenzo Valley High School.

== College career ==
Beck played college football for the Cal Poly Mustangs and won the Buck Buchanan Award in 2004, receiving 35 first-place votes among 257 total balloting points. He was the centerpiece for his team's flex defense and led the Mustangs in tackles in all four seasons he played.

He set school records for tackles in a game (23 at Montana in 2003), season (135 in 2004) and career (449). At the 80th annual East–West Shrine Game at SBC Park in San Francisco, he recorded a team-high six stops for the West.

== Professional career ==
The Atlanta Falcons selected Beck in the third round with the 90th overall pick in the 2005 NFL draft, Following an injury to his left foot while making an interception during the preseason as a rookie, and then playing the 2006 season with the Falcons, he played for the Denver Broncos in 2007.

NFL statistics
Year	Team	GP	Tackles (Solo)
2006	ATL	15	13 (11)
2007	DEN	11	10 (8)
Career		26	23 (19)
