= Courtney Brown (defensive back) =

American football player (born 1984)

No. 27
- Positions: Cornerback, safety

Personal information
- Born: February 10, 1984 (age 42); San Francisco, California, U.S.
- Listed height: 6 ft 1 in (1.85 m)
- Listed weight: 200 lb (91 kg)

Career information
- High school: Saint Mary's College (Berkeley, California)
- College: Cal Poly
- NFL draft: 2007: 7th round, 212th overall pick

Career history
- Dallas Cowboys (2007–2008); New York Giants (2010)

Awards and highlights
- 2× All-GWFC (2005, 2006)

Career NFL statistics
- Games played: 17
- Total tackles: 13
- Fumble recoveries: 1
- Stats at Pro Football Reference

Courtney Leonard Brown (born February 10, 1984) is an American former professional football player who was a cornerback in the National Football League (NFL) for the Dallas Cowboys. He played college football at Cal Poly San Luis Obispo. He was also a member of the New York Giants.

== Early life ==
Brown attended Saint Mary's College High School, where he played as a cornerback and wide receiver. He received all-league honors at defensive back as a senior. In track, he qualified for the CIF State Finals. He was a four-year honor-roll member.

He accepted a football scholarship from California Polytechnic State University, a Division I-AA school. In 2002, he started as a true freshman at wide receiver and caught nine passes for 139 yards (15.4-yard average). In 2003, he was moved to left cornerback where he started six out of the eight games he appeared in, finishing with 16 tackles, two interceptions and one pass defensed. He missed the last three games with an ankle sprain.

In 2004, he sustained a season-ending left knee injury in the season opener against Humboldt State. In 2005, he started at right cornerback, intercepting seven passes (tied for the school record), breaking up 12 passes and making 44 tackles. He was selected for All-Great West Conference First Team honors following the year.

As a senior in 2006, he played in 11 games, registering 51 tackles (1.5 for loss), one interception and seven passes defensed. He allowed only 29 receptions and no touchdowns from opponents. He finished his college career with 31 starts, 111 tackles (1.5 for loss), 10 interceptions, 22 passes defensed and nine receptions for 139 yards.

At a pro day event hosted by San Jose State on March 6, 2007, Brown recorded a 40-yard dash time of 4.32 seconds.

== Professional career ==
=== Dallas Cowboys ===
Brown was selected by the Dallas Cowboys in the seventh round (with the 212th overall pick) of the 2007 NFL draft. Brown came up with an interception during a preseason game at Minnesota on August 30. The team decided to keep him instead of Abram Elam during the last cuts of the preseason on September 2, which was a decision they would later come to regret. On September 26, he suffered a left biceps injury in practice and was inactive for five games. He played in eight games and had two defensive tackles, four special teams tackles and one fumble recovery.

In 2008, he was switched to strong safety, recording one start, six tackles and three special teams tackles. He was waived on September 5, 2009, because of his tackling limitations.

=== New York Giants ===
After spending the 2009 season out of football, Brown signed a future contract with the New York Giants on January 6, 2010. He was placed on the injured reserve list with an ankle injury on September 4, 2010. He wasn't re-signed after his contract expired.
