= Seth Burford =

American football player (born 1979)

Profile
- Position: Quarterback

Personal information
- Born: March 11, 1979 (age 47); Oakdale, California, U.S.
- Listed height: 6 ft 3 in (1.91 m)
- Listed weight: 241 lb (109 kg)

Career information
- High school: Oakdale (CA)
- College: Idaho State; Cal Poly
- NFL draft: 2002: 7th round, 216th overall pick

Career history
- San Diego Chargers (2002); → Barcelona Dragons (2003); Kansas City Chiefs (2004)*
- * Offseason or practice squad member only

Seth Burford (born March 11, 1979) is an American former professional football quarterback, playing for the National Football League (NFL)'s then-San Diego Chargers in 2002. He played college football at Idaho State and then Cal Poly.

== Early life ==
Burford graduated from Oakdale High School in California.

== College career ==
Burford began his collegiate career playing for Idaho State, and transferred to Cal Poly after the 1998 season.

On November 4, 2000, Burford passed for 566 yards against 24th-ranked Northern Iowa, a single-game Cal Poly record, in a 43-41 loss. Two days later on November 6, 2000, ESPN/USA Today selected Burford as the national Division I-AA Offensive Player of the Week.

Collegiate Statistics
| School | Year | GP | Comp. | Pass Att. | Pct. | Passing Yds. | LG | TD | INT | Rush Att. | Rush. Yds. | Avg. | LG | Rush TD |
|---|---|---|---|---|---|---|---|---|---|---|---|---|---|---|
| Idaho State | 1997 (Fr.) | n/a | 56 | 120 | 46.7 | 690 | 45 | 2 | 4 | n/a | n/a | n/a | n/a | n/a |
| Idaho State | 1998 (So.) | 11 | 75 | 139 | 54.0 | 951 | 69 | 7 | 3 | n/a | n/a | n/a | n/a | n/a |
| (Transfer) | 1999 (RS) | - | - | - | - | - | - | - | - | - | - | - | | - |
| Cal Poly | 2000 (Jr.) | 11 | 175 | 306 | 57.2 | 2,672 | 80 | 23 | 7 | 109 | 252 | 2.3 | 31 | 6 |
| Cal Poly | 2001 (Sr.) | 12 | 112 | 211 | 53.1 | 1,610 | 95 | 13 | 5 | 132 | 367 | 2.8 | 33 | 11 |
| | Totals | n/a | 418 | 776 | 53.9 | 5,923 | 95 | 45 | 19 | n/a | n/a | n/a | n/a | n/a |

== Professional career ==
=== San Diego Chargers ===
Before the 2002 NFL draft Burford was regarded as a potential 4th to 7th round pick. Scouts praised his "size, speed and strong arm" but were concerned about his "shoulder problems and his accuracy." The Chargers selected Burford in the seventh round of the 2002 NFL draft with the 216th overall pick. He was rostered as the number-three quarterback, behind Drew Brees and Doug Flutie, with San Diego for the 2002 season, but didn't play in a regular-season game.

Burford was allocated to NFL Europe in 2003 to play for the Barcelona Dragons. He started 10 games, throwing for 1,054 yards along with eight touchdowns and three interceptions. Burford was released by the Chargers after the 2003 preseason, on August 31, 2003. Burford's best preseason game came on August 28, 2002 during a 27-3 road loss to San Francisco, as he went 4-of-6 for a team-high 50 passing yards, and also rushed for 10 yards on three carries in the exhibition finale.

=== Kansas City Chiefs ===
In January 2004, he signed as a free agent with the Kansas City Chiefs, who were hoping to draft him in 2002 before the Chargers took him. However, he was released on June 28, 2004.
