= Asa Jackson =

American football player (born 1989)

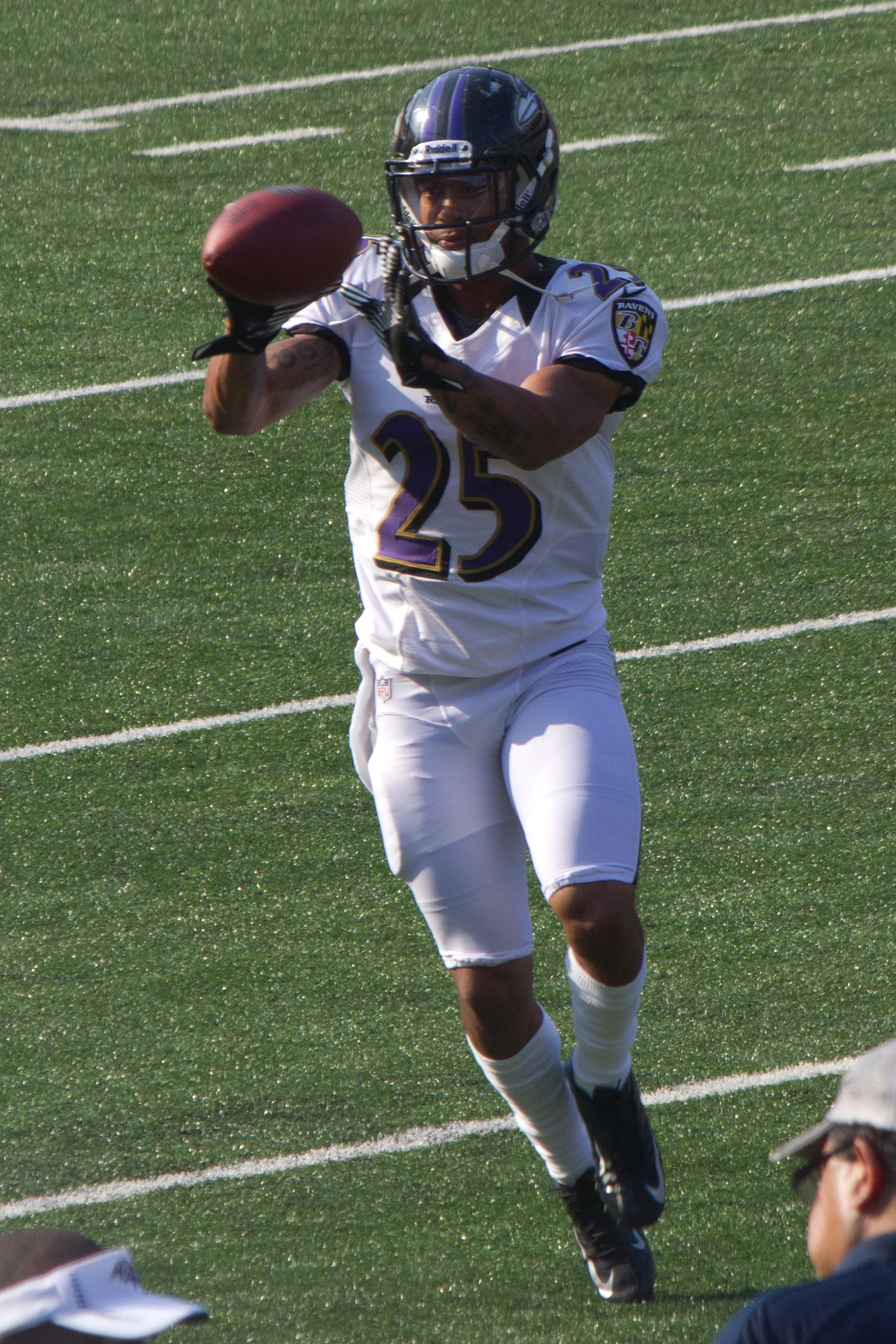
- Jackson with the Baltimore Ravens in 2012

Cal Poly Mustangs
- Title: Cornerbacks coach

Personal information
- Born: December 2, 1989 (age 36); Sacramento, California, U.S.
- Listed height: 5 ft 10 in (1.78 m)
- Listed weight: 183 lb (83 kg)

Career information
- Position: Cornerback (No. 25, 27, 30)
- High school: Christian Brothers (Sacramento)
- College: Cal Poly
- NFL draft: 2012: 5th round, 169th overall pick

Career history

Playing
- Baltimore Ravens (2012−2015); New York Giants (2015)*; Baltimore Ravens (2015); Cincinnati Bengals (2015)*; Arizona Cardinals (2016)*; Baltimore Ravens (2016); Detroit Lions (2016); San Francisco 49ers (2017)
- * Offseason or practice squad member only

Coaching
- Ohio State (2019–2020) Assistant defensive backs coach; Christian Brothers HS (CA) (2021) Defensive coordinator; Cal Poly (2022) Cornerbacks coach; Cal Poly (2023) Wide receivers coach; Cal Poly (2024–present) Cornerbacks coach

Awards and highlights
- Super Bowl champion (XLVII)

Career NFL statistics
- Total tackles: 38
- Pass deflections: 4
- Stats at Pro Football Reference

Asa Rashaan Webster Jackson (born December 2, 1989) is an American former professional football cornerback and current football coach. He was selected by the Baltimore Ravens in the fifth round of the 2012 NFL draft. He played college football for California Polytechnic State University.

== College career ==
Jackson was a four-year starter at California Polytechnic State University, San Luis Obispo, more commonly referred to as Cal Poly. He finished his college career with 137 solo tackles, 199 total tackles, 8 interceptions for 307 yards (ranks first in school history) and 3 touchdowns (ties school record with David Fullerton), 40 pass deflections, 3 forced fumbles, and a single sack for -6 yards. He played in 43 games, and started in 42 of them.

In July 2011, he was selected to the preseason Buck Buchanan Award Watch List, among 20 candidates for the Football Championship Subdivision's national Defensive Player of the Year honor, named by The Sports Network.

During a 48–14 win over South Dakota State in 2011, Jackson scored on a rare length-of-the-field interception return for a touchdown; although he intercepted the pass about 2 yards deep into his own end zone, NCAA statistics technically record the full return as 100 yards, which equaled the school's deepest return in 43 years.

Combined between punt and kickoff returns, Jackson also compiled 936 career return yards on special teams in college.

In the final voting for the Buchanan Award announced in January 2012, Jackson received 28 balloting points, including two first-place votes, as New Hampshire's Matt Evans won the award.

=== Statistics ===
College statistics
Season	GP	Tackles (S)	INT	Yds.	Avg.	LG	TD	PBU	KR	Yds.	Avg.	LG	PR	Yds.	Avg.	LG
2008 (Fr.)	11	42 (35)	2	46	23.0	46	0	10	0	-	-	-	0	-	-	-
2009 (So.)	11	48 (31)	2	47	23.5	47t	1	6	0	-	-	-	13	201	15.5	59
2010 (Jr.)	11	55 (40)	2	62	31.0	47	0	9	1	16	16.0	16	17	214	12.6	37
2011 (Sr.)	10	54 (31)	2	152	76.0	100t	2	7	14	361	25.8	49	8	144	18.0	41
Totals	43	199 (137)	8	307	38.4	100t	3	32	15	377	25.1	49	38	559	14.7	59

== Professional career ==
=== Baltimore Ravens (first stint) ===
In February 2012, Jackson was invited to the NFL Scouting Combine in Indianapolis, where he recorded the 12th-best shuttle time of any attendee (4.03 seconds) for any position in the class, and was timed at 4.48 seconds in the 40-yard dash.

Jackson was selected in the fifth round of the 2012 NFL draft with the 169th overall pick. He is probably most known for returning a punt for a touchdown against the Atlanta Falcons during a preseason NFL game, and then started doing the famous Gangnam Style dance. Although, the play was nullified by a holding penalty. Jackson was placed on injured reserve on December 16, 2014. Jackson was cut by the Baltimore Ravens on September 5, 2015.

=== Suspension ===
Jackson was suspended for four games without pay for violating the NFL policy on performance-enhancing substances on December 11, 2012, for using Adderall, a prescription drug, to treat his attention-deficit hyperactivity disorder. On August 2, 2013, he again violated the PED policy and was suspended without pay for an additional eight games of the 2013 season. Jackson then completed the required paperwork to be authorized to take Adderall.

=== New York Giants ===
On September 6, 2015, the New York Giants claimed Jackson off Waivers. He was waived just two days after signing with the Giants.

=== Baltimore Ravens (second stint) ===
On September 10, 2015, Jackson was signed to the Ravens' practice squad.

On October 13, 2015, Jackson was re-signed to the active roster. He was waived/injured on November 17 due to an ankle injury. The next day, he was placed on the team's injured reserve and another day later, on November 19, 2015, he was waived from injured reserve.

=== Cincinnati Bengals ===
On November 30, 2015, Jackson was signed to the Bengals' practice squad.

=== Arizona Cardinals ===
On January 28, 2016, Jackson signed a futures contract with the Arizona Cardinals. On August 29, 2016, Jackson was waived by the Cardinals.

=== Baltimore Ravens (third stint) ===
On October 17, 2016, Jackson was signed to the Ravens' practice squad. He was promoted to the active roster on November 15, 2016. He was released by the Ravens on November 26, 2016, and was re-signed to the practice squad.

=== Detroit Lions ===
On December 6, 2016, Jackson was signed by the Lions off the Ravens' practice squad. He was placed on injured reserve on January 3, 2017, with an ankle injury.

=== San Francisco 49ers ===
On August 8, 2017, Jackson was signed by the San Francisco 49ers. He was waived on September 2, 2017, and was signed to the practice squad the next day. He was promoted to the active roster on September 16, 2017. He was placed on injured reserve on October 10, 2017.

== Coaching career ==
In 2019, Jackson started coaching as an assistant defensive backs coach with Ohio State.

In 2021, Jackson was the defensive coordinator for his high school alma mater, Christian Brothers High School.

In 2022, Jackson was hired as the cornerbacks coach for his alma mater, Cal Poly. In 2023, he was promoted to wide receivers coach. In 2024, he was promoted to his third position group as he transitioned into the running backs coach position. He reverted back to cornerbacks coach before the start of the 2024 season.
