= Cal Poly Mustangs football =

University football team

2026 Cal Poly Mustangs football team
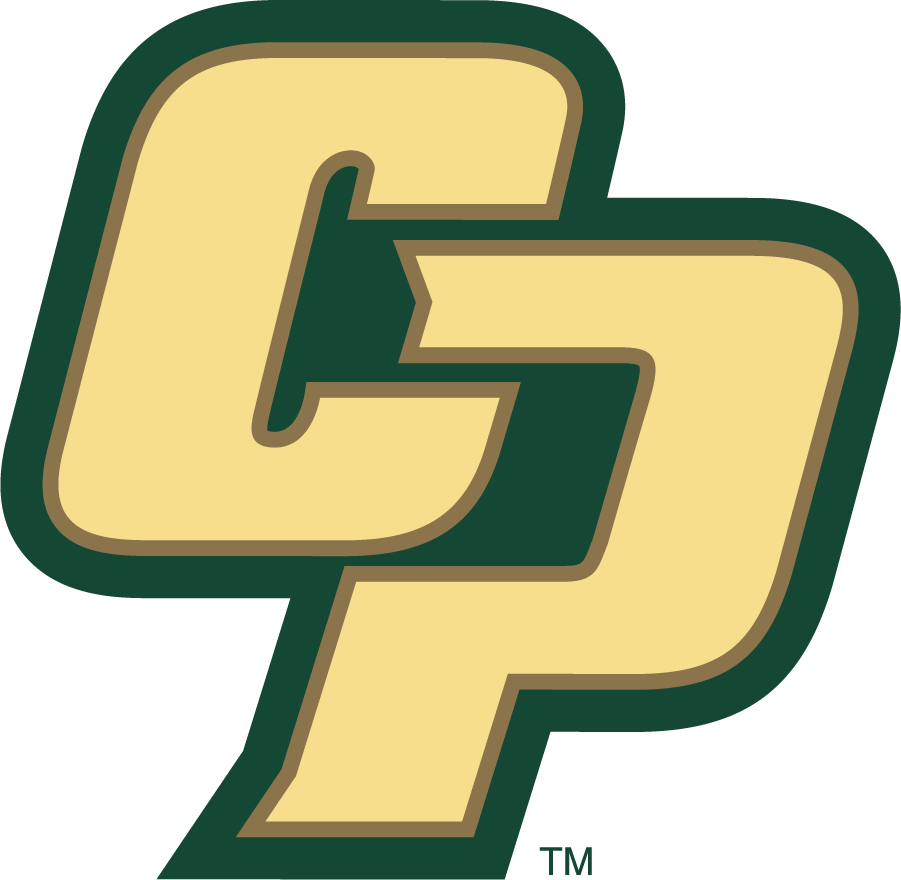
- First season: 1915; 111 years ago
- Athletic director: Carter Henderson
- Head coach: Tim Skipper; 1st season, 3–3 (.500)
- Location: San Luis Obispo, California
- Stadium: Mustang Memorial Field (capacity: 11,075)
- Field: Mustang Memorial Field Presented by Dignity Health French Hospital Medical Center
- NCAA division: Division I FCS
- Conference: Big Sky
- Colors: Poly green, copper gold, and stadium gold
- All-time record: 528–471–19 (.528)
- Bowl record: 0–1 (.000)

NCAA Division II championships
- 1980

Conference championships
- CCAA: 1952, 1953, 1958, 1969, 1970, 1971, 1972, 1973, 1976, 1977, 1978, 1979, 1980 WFC: 1982, 1990 AWC: 1994 Great West: 2004, 2005, 2008, 2011 Big Sky: 2012
- Rivalries: Fresno State; Sacramento State; San Diego; UC Davis (rivalry); UC Santa Barbara (rivalry)
- Fight song: Ride High, You Mustangs
- Mascot: Musty the Mustang
- Marching band: Cal Poly Mustang Band
- Outfitter: Adidas
- Website: gopoly.com

The Cal Poly Mustangs are the football team representing California Polytechnic State University located in San Luis Obispo, California. The team plays its home games at Mustang Memorial Field, at the NCAA Division I FCS level in the Big Sky Conference. The current head coach is Tim Skipper, who began his tenure in December 2025.

== History ==
Football was first played on the Cal Poly campus in 1916. At that time, Cal Poly was a vocational school, as it did not become a four-year college until 1941.

=== 1915 to 1940s: The beginning ===
The California Polytechnic School played mostly high school teams and college freshmen teams for its first 16 seasons. In 1933, the Mustangs enjoyed their first undefeated season under coach Howie O'Daniels. During the 1933 campaign, the Mustangs did not allow a single point during that season. Cal Poly officially became a four-year school in 1941 and posted a 5–3–1 record under O'Daniels. Football was put on hold during World War II ('43 and '44) and resumed in 1945.

=== 1950s: Jeter, Madden, Beathard leave legacy ===
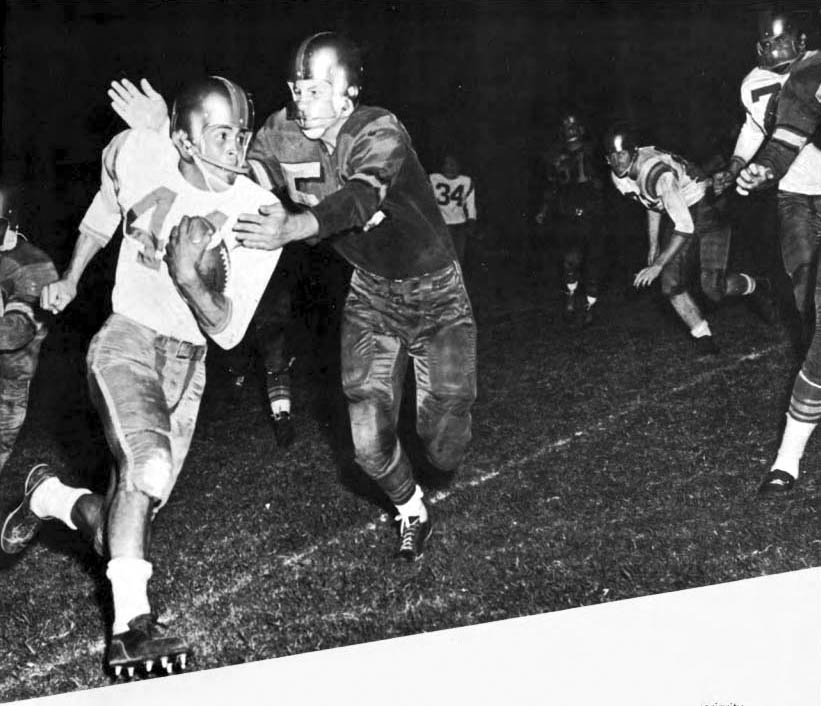
Cal Poly (white jersey) v McMurry game in 1955

Under coach LeRoy Hughes, Cal Poly experienced its second undefeated season in 1953. In the decade of the 1950s, the Mustangs posted a record of 67–29–1. During this time, All-American Stan Sheriff became Cal Poly's first player to join an NFL roster, beginning with the Pittsburgh Steelers in 1954.

Hughes' teams also included future Chicago Bears running back Perry Jeter and future Pro Football Hall of Fame inductee John Madden, who was known as a bruising tackle. Upon graduation, Madden was drafted by the Philadelphia Eagles.

Of Jeter, legendary Bears founder George Halas commented in 1954: "Never have we received a more accurate appraisal (in promotional assessment) of a player than LeRoy Hughes gave us on Jeter." Joining Madden and Jeter on the Mustang roster was quarterback and defensive back Bobby Beathard, who would be inducted into the Pro Football Hall of Fame in 2018 as the architect and general manager responsible for building the Washington franchise into a perennial Super Bowl-winning and contending dynasty.

=== 1960s: Tragedy strikes Cal Poly; Harper brought on ===
Tragedy struck in 1960 following a game at Bowling Green State University on Saturday, October 29, 1960, when a plane leaving Toledo Airport crashed, killing 22 people. This included 16 Mustang football players and the team manager. The next seven seasons produced a 22–45 record. Joe Harper, then a Colorado assistant, was hired as Mustang head coach on February 7, 1968. Harper, a former offensive guard for UCLA (1956–58), directed Cal Poly to 7–3 and 6–4 seasons to end the decade, respectively. In the final year of the decade, Cal Poly upset Fresno State 21–17, leading the Mustang Daily campus newspaper to publish a rare all-capped double-truck headline declaring the game as "One of the Greatest Wins in Poly Grid History". At the time, Harper told the Fresno Bee the win was "the greatest game I have ever been involved with." The result also made the sports section of the San Francisco Chronicle, which noted the Mustangs' first win over the Bulldogs in 12 years.

=== 1970s: Harper builds a dynasty ===
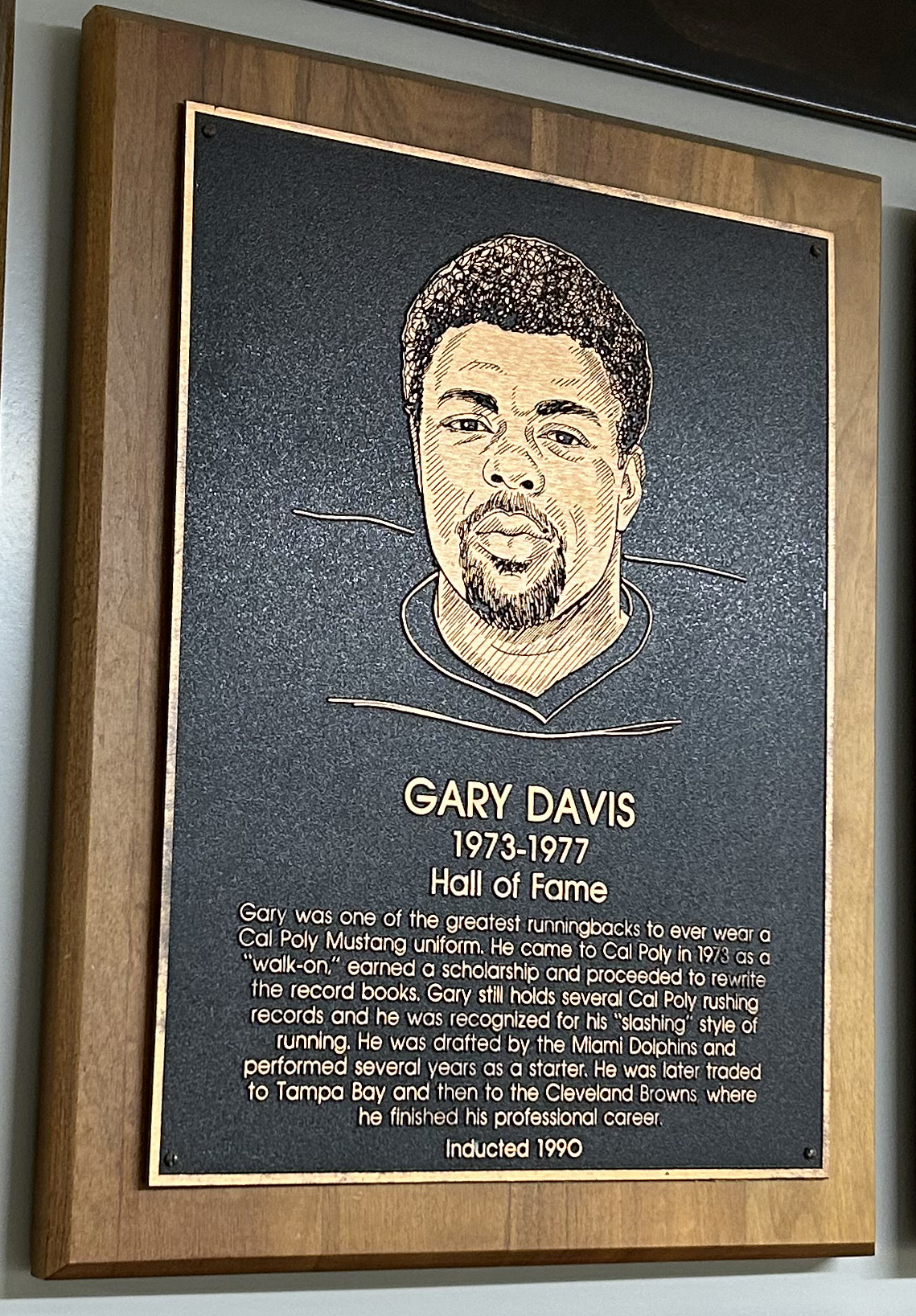
Gary Davis, whose Cal Poly Hall of Fame plaque is shown in 2023, set numerous Mustang rushing records in the 1970s before going on to play four years for Don Shula's Miami Dolphins in the NFL.

Under Harper, Cal Poly produced an 8–0–1 regular-season record in 1972 and received a trip to the Camellia Bowl to play in the Western Regional Championship Game of the NCAA's College Division. Cal Poly was ranked No. 3 in the division by both the AP and UPI polls heading into the postseason. They would end up losing 38–21 to the University of North Dakota (North Central Conference co-champs) in the bowl game hosted in Sacramento's Hughes Stadium, telecast regionally on ABC. In 1978, the Mustangs would make it to the NCAA Division II playoffs but lost to Winston-Salem State.

Another highlight during the decade was Cal Poly's most recent football victory over Fresno State, which came 26–0 on Oct. 6, 1979. The score marked, at the time, the first shutout in the 57-year history between the two programs. Mustang safety Chris Jones had two interceptions in the game, while fullback Paul Dickens led the offense by rushing for 163 yards on 35 carries.

Each of the ten Mustang football teams in the 1970s posted a winning season.

=== 1980s: Mustangs win national title ===
In 1980, Harper led the Mustangs to the NCAA Division II National Football Championship. Cal Poly defeated Eastern Illinois in the championship game on ABC and would finish the season with a 10–3 record that included a win over eventual-Division I-AA national champion Boise State. Never before or since has a D-II team defeated the eventual I-AA national champion and won a D-II national title in the same year.

During the 1980 season, running back Louis Jackson led the nation at the Division II level with 1,424 rushing yards on 287 carries.

Robbie Martin, who starred in the NCAA championship win, compiled a career punt-return average of 16.9 yards per runback, graduating after the 1980 title season with the third-best PR average in division history at the time.

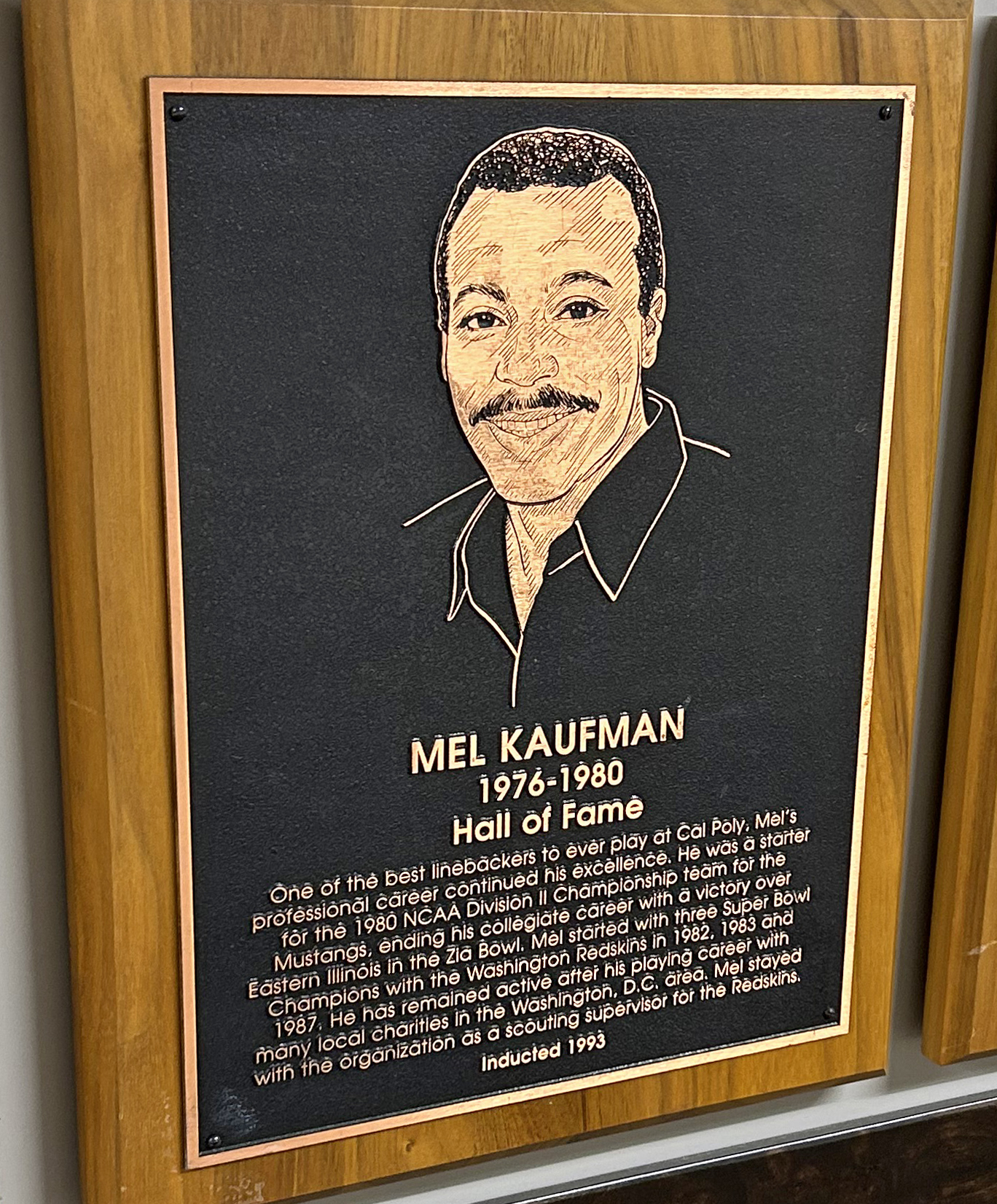
Commemorated in the Cal Poly Hall of Fame, Mel Kaufman helped lead the Mustangs to a 1980 national championship before becoming a starting linebacker for Washington in the NFL, winning two Super Bowl rings.

Following the national title, the Mustangs were honored with a parade through downtown San Luis Obispo on December 15, 1980. The parade traveled down Higuera Street before a rally held in Mission Plaza. Then-mayor Lynn Cooper spoke at the celebration.

On November 20, 1982, Cal Poly's Clarence Martin set an all-time Division II single-game record for most yards per kickoff return (minimum of three returns), averaging 71.7 yards (215 total) on his three KRs vs. then-rival Pomona. The record was finally broken after 39 years by Carson-Newman return specialist DeQuan Dudley in 2021.

=== 1990s: The move to Division I ===
In 1990, coach Lyle Setencich would lead the Mustangs to another playoff appearance before losing in the second round to powerhouse North Dakota State. The 1990 Mustangs yielded just 11.3 points per game, the best defensive average throughout Division II for the year. The defensive front was led by lineman Pat Moore, who received an invitation to the NFL Scouting Combine after compiling 67 tackles and 9.5 sacks during the 1990 season. Also aiding the defense was punter Doug O'Neill, who in 1991 led the nation in punting average, with 45.1 yards per punt, while earning first-team All-American honors from the AP.

In 1994, Cal Poly would make the jump to Division I-AA (now Football Championship Subdivision) with head coach Andre Patterson at the helm. The Mustangs would see moderate success, posting a 7–4 record in Patterson's first year followed by two 5–6 seasons before Patterson departed for a position as an NFL line coach.

In 1997, Larry Welsh took over the program and led the Mustangs to a 10–1 record and a national ranking of 18th. The season was highlighted by a 38–35 win at FBS-level New Mexico State. However, still only in its fourth year in the I-AA ranks at the time, Cal Poly was not extended an invitation to the national playoffs. Welsh (a 2017 inductee to the CIF Southern Section Hall of Fame) would follow that season with three 3–8 seasons and was not contractually renewed by then-athletic director John McCutcheon. The 1997 team's omission from the postseason was referred to as a "snub" by the Los Angeles Times following the regular season.

The 1997 squad finished ranked No. 16 in the TSN Division I-AA media poll and No. 17 in the USA Today coaches Top 25. Cal Poly quarterback Alli Abrew compiled a passer-efficiency rating of 179.5 in 1997, leading the nation at the I-AA level.

=== 2001–2008: Rich Ellerson era ===
Rich Ellerson, credited by Sports Illustrated for his role in refining Arizona's versatile "Desert Swarm" defense featuring Tedy Bruschi, was introduced as Cal Poly's new head coach on December 6, 2000. In 2001, his first year, he led the Mustangs to a 6–5 season. Two years later, the program earned its second modern-day win over an FBS opponent, routing UTEP 34–13 on September 6, 2003.

Coach Ellerson would emphasize defense and, by 2004, not only did his 9–2 Mustangs secure their first of three Great West Conference football titles, but linebacker Jordan Beck would win the Buck Buchanan Award as the nation's best defensive player in the NCAA Division I Football Championship Subdivision. In 2004, Beck led the nation at the Division I-AA level in both solo tackles per game (8.82) and forced fumbles per game (0.55).

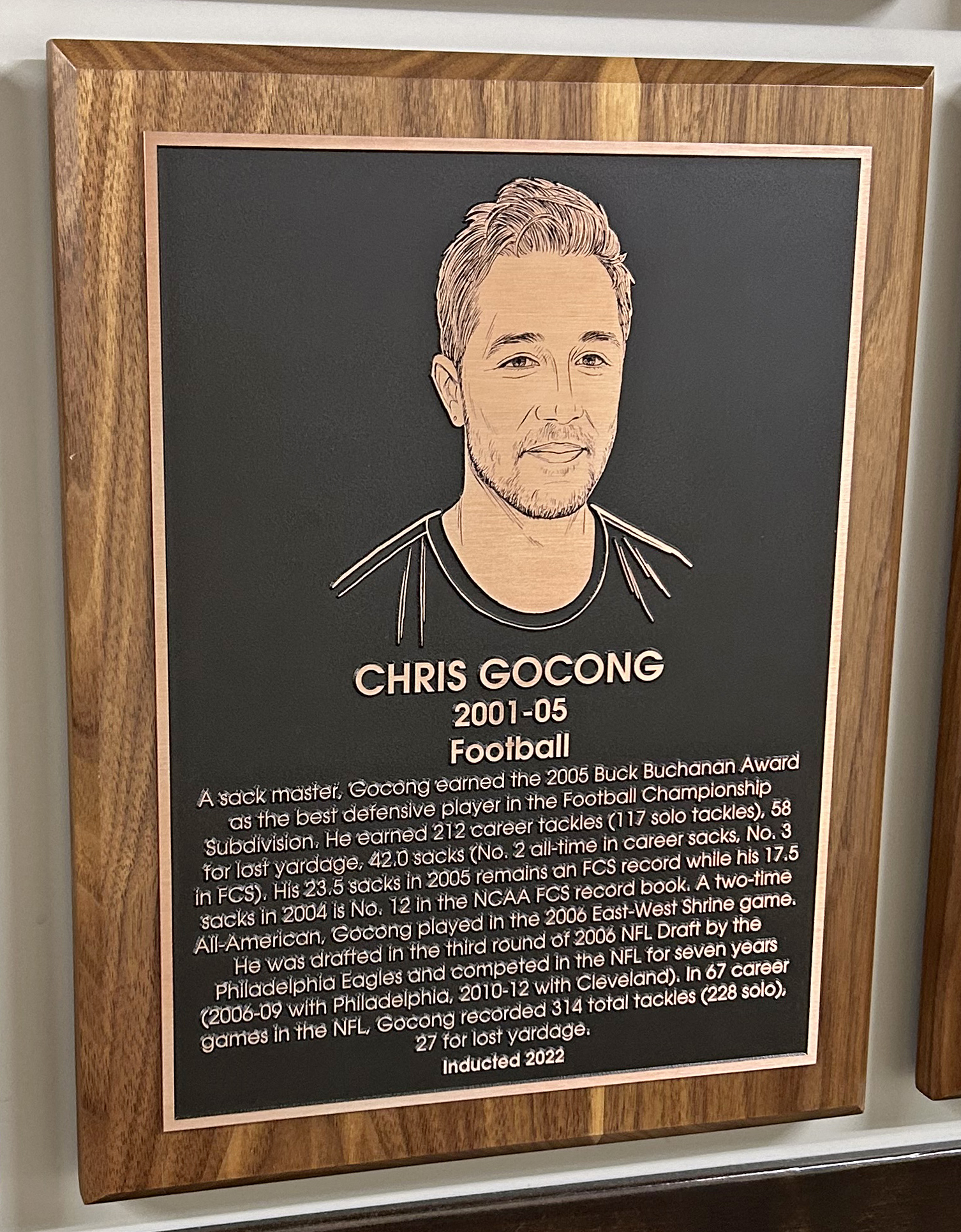
Chris Gocong, who helped lead Cal Poly to an FCS playoff win over Montana in 2005, was drafted in the third round by the Philadelphia Eagles, and played six years in the NFL.

Following a 6–0 start to the 2004 season, Cal Poly found itself ranked ahead of 32 FBS-level teams in the Jeff Sagarin NCAA Football Ratings, an index which combined all Division I-A and I-AA programs into one ranking system. Fan interest crested as the Mustangs moved to 7–0, with the upcoming week's rivalry game against UC Davis sold-out on campus well in advance of game day (ultimately won by the Aggies, snapping Cal Poly's win streak despite breaking then-stadium attendance records in back-to-back games). In 2004, the Mustangs ranked No. 1 in the country for rushing defense, giving up 84.3 yards per game on the year.

During the next two years, Cal Poly would experience continued success on the field and another NCAA first as two more players would win the Buchanan Award: Chris Gocong in 2005 and Kyle Shotwell in 2006. In 2005, the 9-4 Mustangs also earned their first FCS playoff berth and victory with a 35–21 win over Montana. A key to the playoff victory over the Grizzlies was running back James Noble, who scored four touchdowns in the game. (Noble had arrived at Cal Poly after setting the San Bernardino County single-season rushing record, amassing 2,256 yards at Barstow High in 2003, fourth-most in the entire state.) Cal Poly was then knocked out in the quarterfinals by Texas State on ESPN2 in a 14-7 defensive battle. Gocong's 23.5 sacks during the 2005 season remain an all-time FCS/I-AA single-season record.

The 2008 season would prove to be another good year for the Mustangs, whose victories included a road win over FBS San Diego State (the program's second in a three-year stretch) as well as a 36–35 overtime loss to the bowl-bound Wisconsin Badgers in Madison. The 2008 Mustangs also made the playoffs but lost a shootout in the first round against Weber State. The 2008 season saw Cal Poly lead the country in both total offense at the FCS level, totaling 487.5 yards per game, and total scoring (44.4 points per game). One of several keys to the prolific offense was center Stephen Field, selected as an All-American in back-to-back seasons.

During the 2008 season, Cal Poly matched its highest ranking in the FCS to date, voted No. 3 in The Sports Network poll on November 4, and maintaining the No. 3 ranking over the next three weeks. During the year, student-printed T-shirts were distributed in the student section declaring "Throw it to Ramses!" in reference to the team's record-breaking wide receiver, Ramses Barden.

Barden, as well as cornerback Courtney Brown, Gocong, defensive back David Richardson, defensive back Asa Jackson and Beck were all developed by Ellerson and his staff during the decade and all joined NFL rosters after being drafted or signing as free agents. At the conclusion of the 2008 season, with three conference titles, two postseason appearances, multiple All Americans developed and a record of 56–34, Ellerson departed California's Central Coast as he accepted an offer to become the head coach of Army.

As of 2021, Barden still held the all-time FCS/I-AA record for consecutive games during a career with a TD catch (20, from 2007 to 2008).

=== 2009–2019: Tim Walsh era ===
In 2009, Tim Walsh, the offensive coordinator for the Army Black Knights during the 2007 and 2008 seasons, was hired as Cal Poly's 16th head coach.

On November 12, 2011, Cal Poly set an all-time single-game FCS/I-AA record for most team rushes, running 95 times for 405 yards against Eastern Washington.

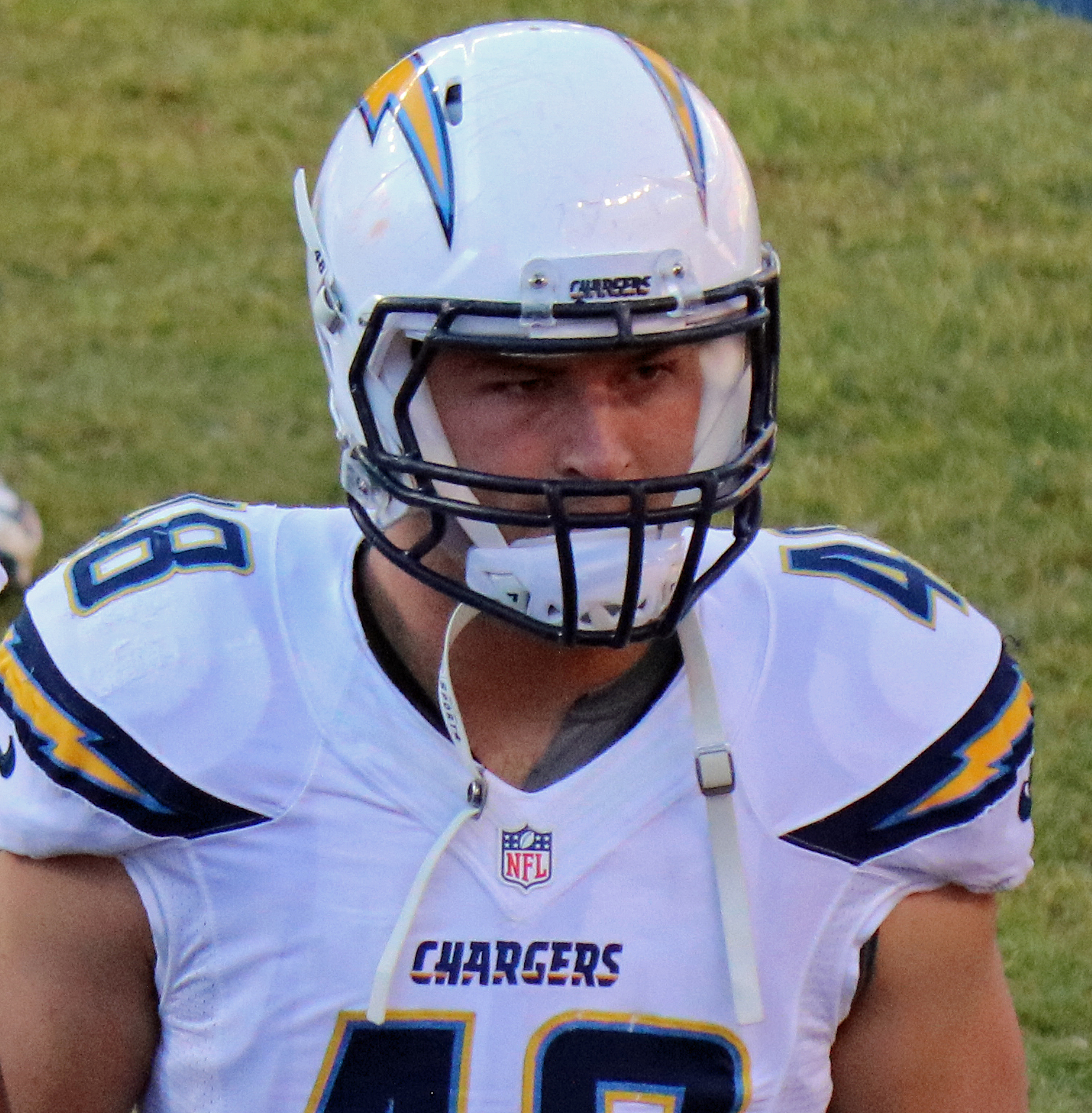
Linebacker Nick Dzubnar helped lead Cal Poly to a share of the 2012 Big Sky Conference football title before going on to play for the San Diego Chargers and Tennessee Titans in the NFL.

The 2012 season proved to be the most successful of Walsh's coaching career, as his Mustangs finished 9–3, in a three-way tie for the Big Sky Conference football title and earned and an NCAA FCS playoff invitation. During the year, the Mustangs picked up a 24–22 win over FBS-level Wyoming. Cal Poly fell in the first round at Sam Houston State, 18–16.

During the 2012 season, Cal Poly peaked in the national FCS rankings at No. 11 on October 22, although the Jeff Sagarin Ratings ranked the Mustangs second in the FCS in the week of October 24. Midway through the 2012 season, running back Deonte Williams was added to the Walter Payton Award Watch List.

In 2014, Cal Poly quarterback Chris Brown became the first player in the school's Division I-era history to throw for a touchdown and score TDs on both a run and a reception in the same game, as he achieved the rarity in a 30–24 victory at Weber State.

The Mustangs returned to the playoffs in 2016 with a 7–4 record. On October 15, 2016, Cal Poly set a Big Sky single-game record for passing accuracy, as former MaxPreps National High School Player of the Year Dano Graves led a 13-of-14 day for a .929 completion percentage in a 55–35 win over Portland State.

During the 2016 season, Cal Poly was ranked as highly as No. 14 in the FCS STATS poll, on both October 24 and October 31. They lost in the first round to the University of San Diego, 35–21. Following the 2016 season, Walsh was awarded a five-year contract extension; however, after going 1–10, 5-6 and 3–8, Walsh elected to retire following the 2019 campaign with a 59–66 record while at Cal Poly.

In 2018, Cal Poly's Joe Protheroe led the country in rushing yards at the FCS level, gaining 1,810 yards on 363 carries. The 2018 season also saw Cal Poly defensive back Dominic Frasch lead the nation in passes defended (a statistic which combines interceptions and pass breakups) for the year in the FCS, totaling 19. Also in 2018, Mustang quarterback Khaleel Jenkins set an all-time single-season Big Sky Conference record for TD/pass attempts/INT ratio, not throwing any interceptions among his 89 passes (nine of which went for touchdowns, including four to J. J. Koski, who went on to play for the L.A. Rams).

=== 2020–2025: Baldwin to Wulff era ===
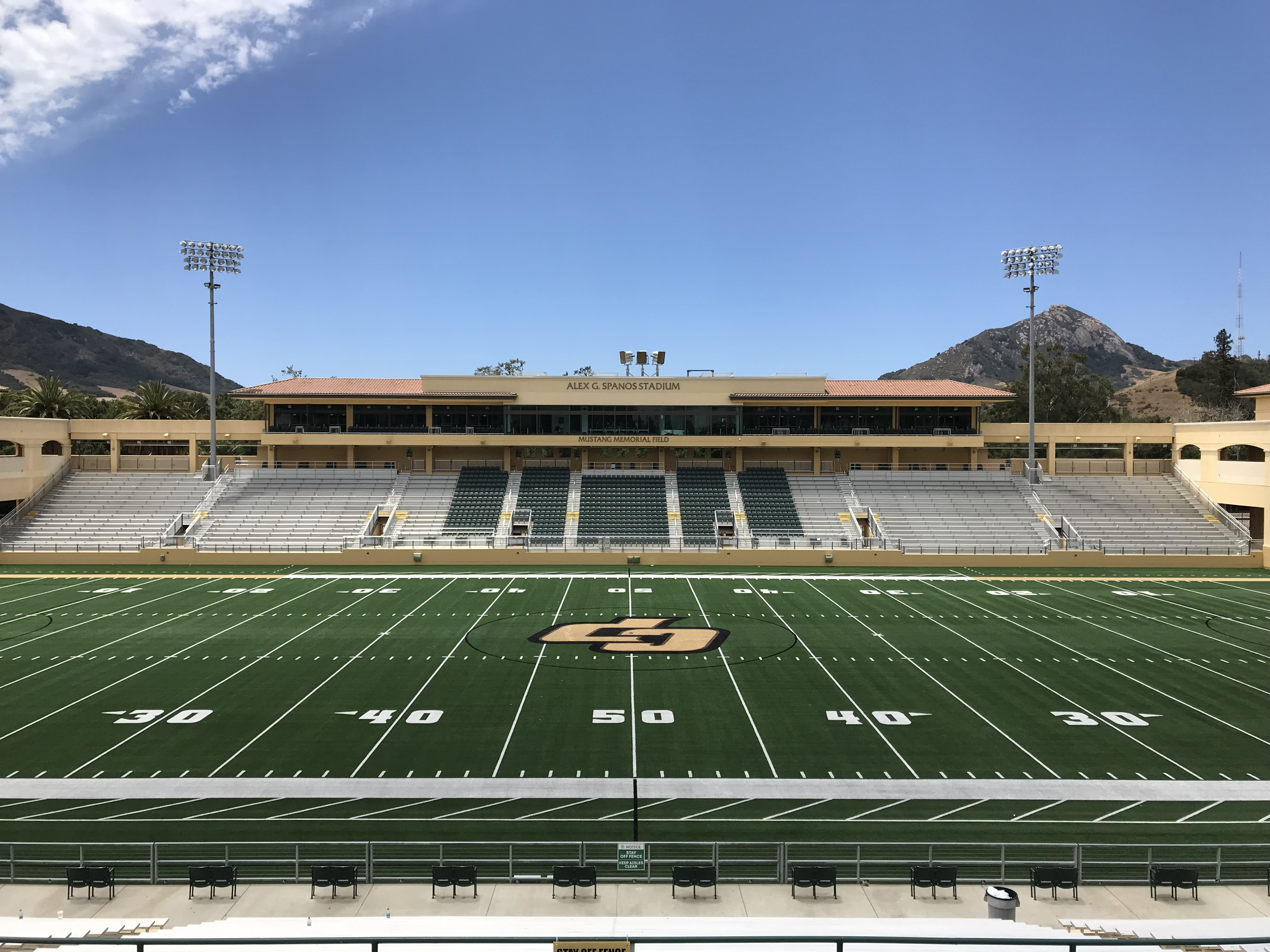
A new surface, FieldTurf Super Elite Vertex Prime, was installed to Alex G. Spanos Stadium at Cal Poly in 2022. With the addition, Cal Poly joined all 11 fellow Big Sky Conference football universities with modern turf field surfaces.

Former FCS national championship-winning Eastern Washington head coach Beau Baldwin was announced as Cal Poly's new head coach on December 11, 2019. Baldwin, who coached Cooper Kupp at EWU, began to implement a "multiple" offensive scheme, and Cal Poly thereafter saw its passing yardage per game increase by 52.1 percent from 2019 to the shortened 2021 spring season, and then increase by another 18 percent in the fall of 2021.

The program dealt with multiple starts, stoppages and restarts to practice schedules amid COVID-19, going a combined 2-12 during the next 24 months overall, beginning with the lack of a traditional spring calendar in 2020. Senior linebacker Matt Shotwell was named to the Associated Press All-American Third Team in December 2021.

Two Cal Poly freshmen, edge Elijah Ponder and punt returner Giancarlo Woods, were selected to the Phil Steele Magazine Freshman All-America Team in January 2022. Then, in April 2022, Cal Poly held its first uninterrupted spring practice season in three years.

In June 2022, a replacement of the then-Alex G. Spanos Stadium field was completed, as Cal Poly joined the rest of its peers in the Big Sky as having a turf surface. The conversion was assisted by Diversified Project Services International.

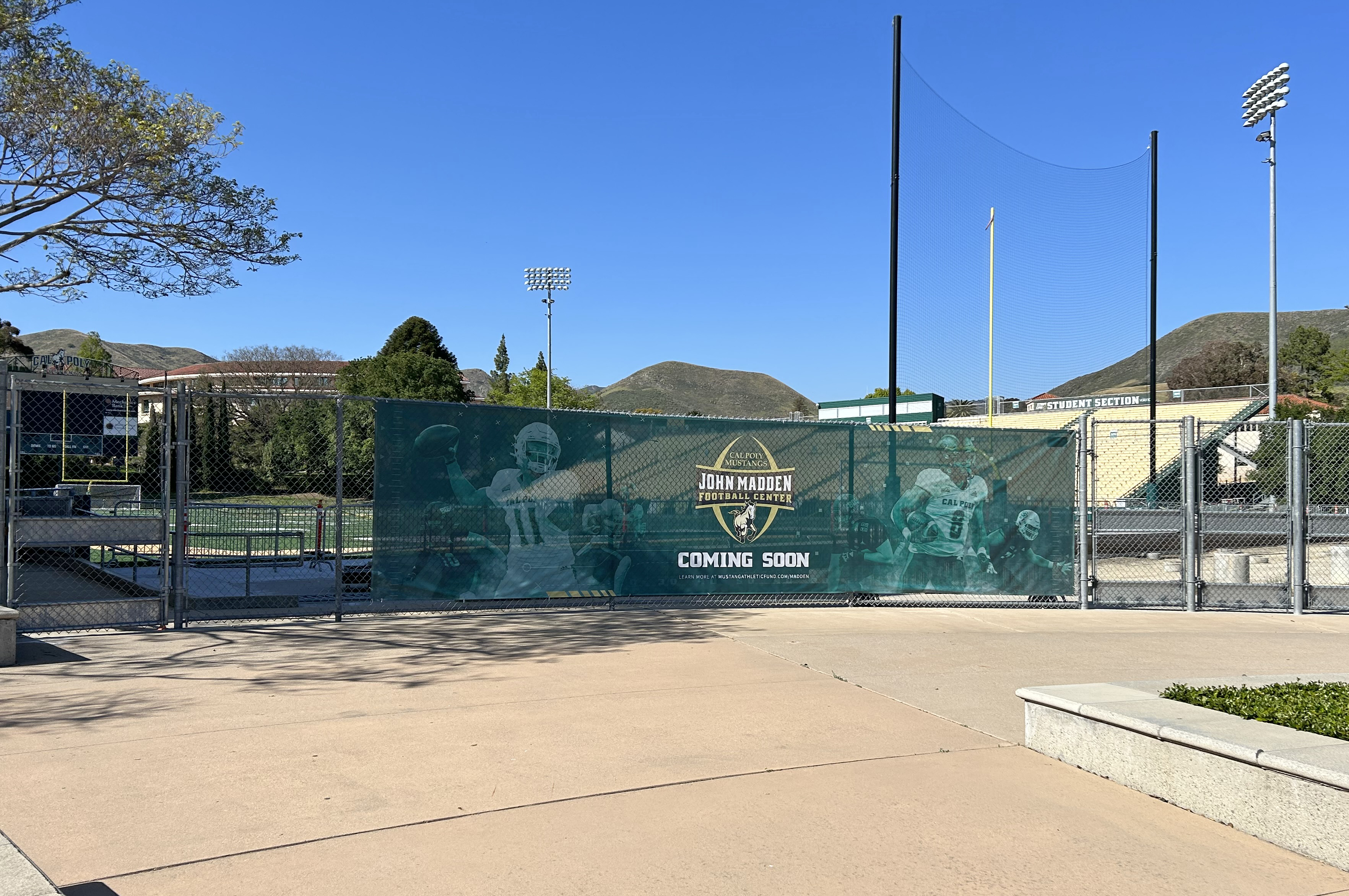
Signage announcing the construction zone for Cal Poly's upcoming John Madden Football Center is shown at the San Luis Obispo campus in May 2023.

Cal Poly started the 2022 season 1-1, with quarterback Jaden Jones winning the Big Sky Conference Offensive Player of the Week award for September 12. Jones, however, who began the year with a 5-to-0 touchdown-to-interception ratio, was lost to a season-ending leg injury during the third week.

Midway through the year, the university announced the upcoming addition of a John Madden Football Center, a total $30-million training facility adjacent to the stadium. The 30,000-square-foot facility would furnish a new locker room, weightlifting stations, a nutrition area, study lounge and film-review theater.

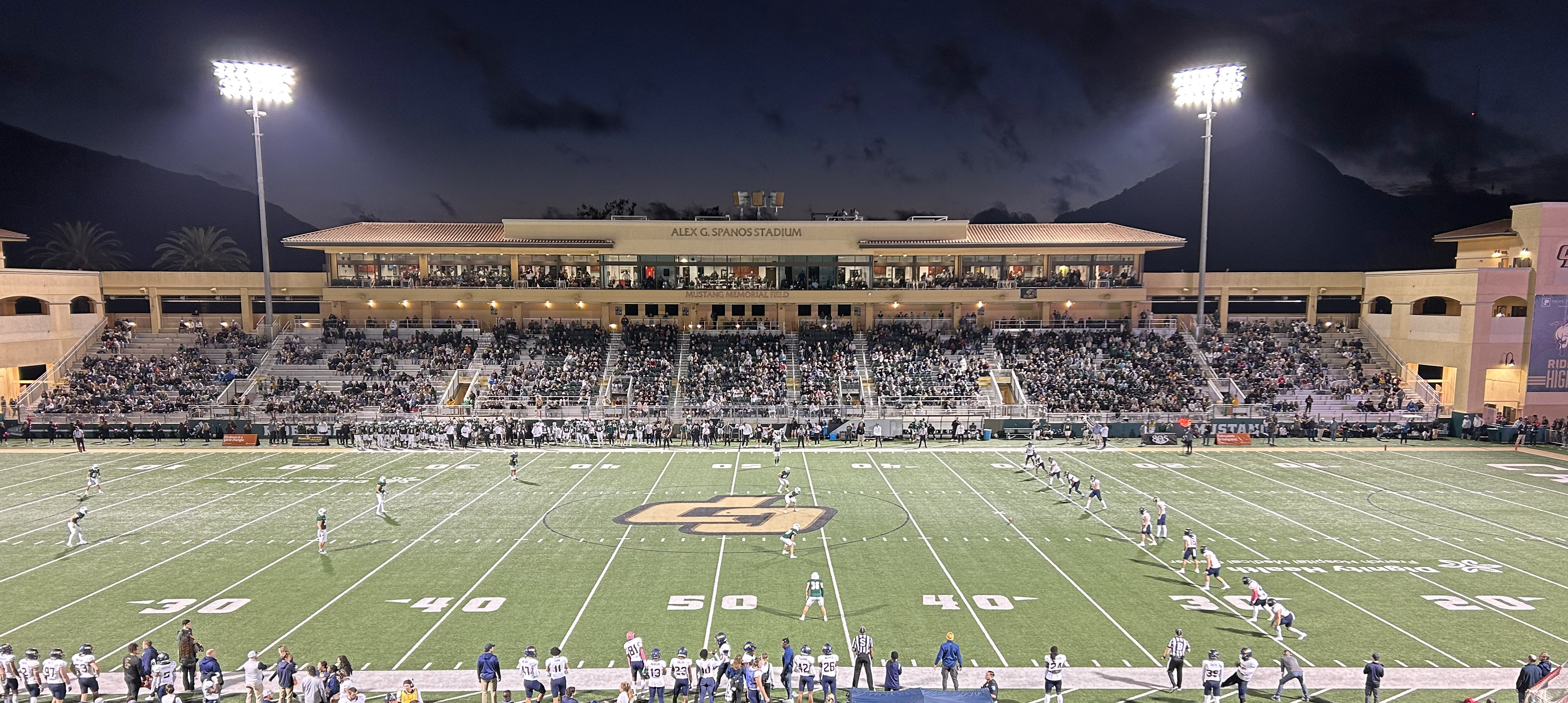
Cal Poly prepares to receive the kickoff from Northern Colorado during a 2023 Big Sky Conference win.

Meanwhile, the Mustangs also suffered more injuries across the lineup, and started a combined seven total backup linemen the rest of the fall, ultimately finishing 2–9 in closing the year with a 49–42 victory over Portland State. Baldwin then accepted a position as offensive coordinator at Arizona State early in the offseason, and incumbent assistant offensive line coach Paul Wulff was promptly elevated to head coach on December 6, 2022.

One of the team leaders in 2022 was wide receiver Chris Coleman, selected to the East-West Shrine Bowl 1000 watch list in the preseason, before going on to finish with 939 receiving yards. Coleman signed an undrafted free-agent contract with the Miami Dolphins in late April 2023.

=== 2026–present: Skipper era ===
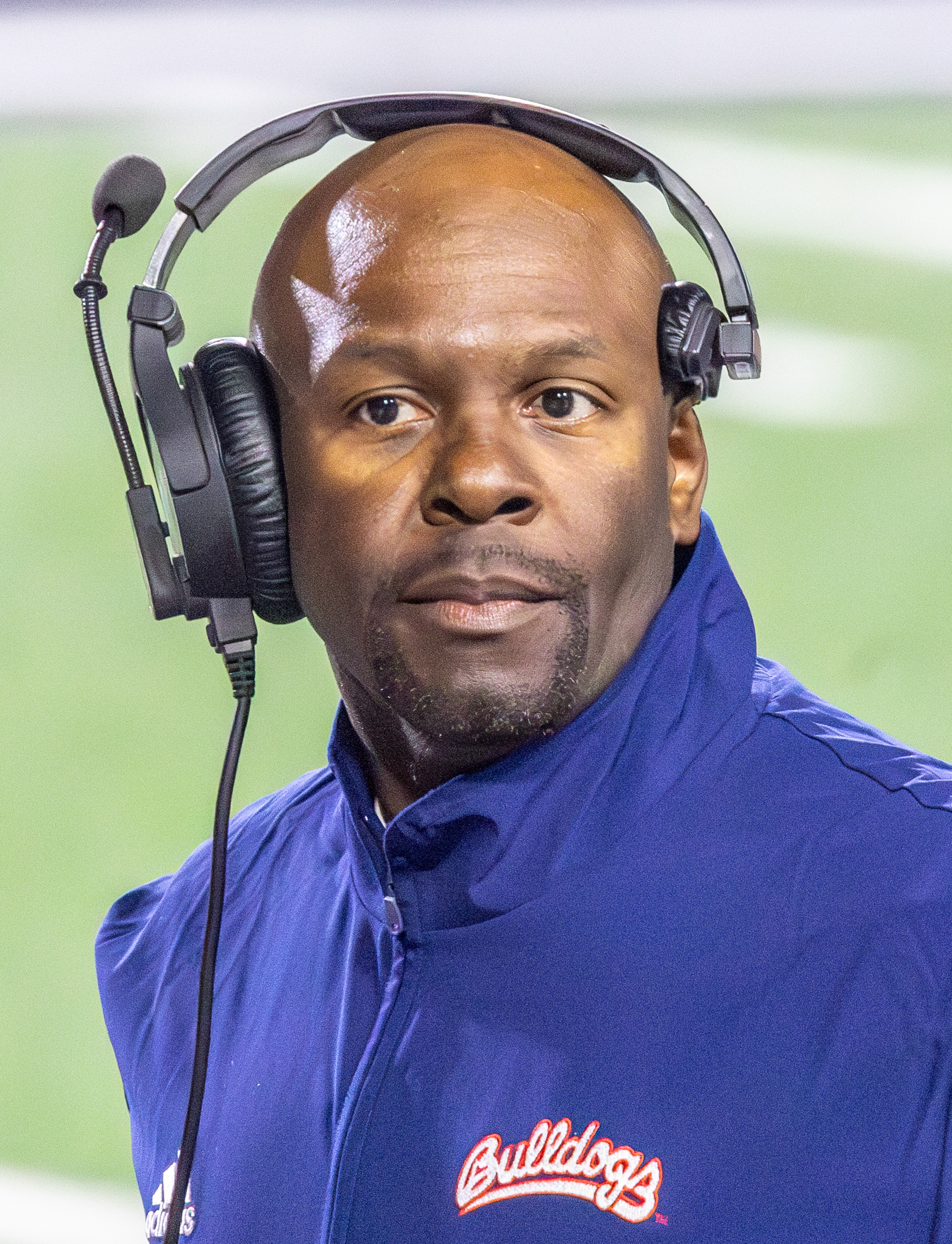
Tim Skipper

On December 3, 2025, Tim Skipper was named the 19th head coach at California Polytechnic State University, San Luis Obispo. The Mustangs opened their season on ESPN against the Idaho Vandals, their seventh linearly nationally televised game (following the 1980 national title game on ABC, the 2005 second-round playoff matchup on ESPN2, a 2008 game on Big Ten Network, a 2015 game on Pac-12 Network, the 2017 opener on ESPNU, and a 2022 game on FS1).

The 2026 opener also set an attendance record at Spanos Stadium with 11,186 fans. Cal Poly came out on top 38-34, with the winning touchdown being thrown by quarterback Anthony Grigsby Jr. to wide receiver Tayvion McCoy on fourth down. Grigsby's performance earned him the Big Sky Conference Offensive Player of the Week award.

== Affiliation history ==
=== Classifications ===
- 1937–1972: NCAA College Division
- 1973–1993: NCAA Division II
- 1994–present: NCAA Division I–AA/FCS

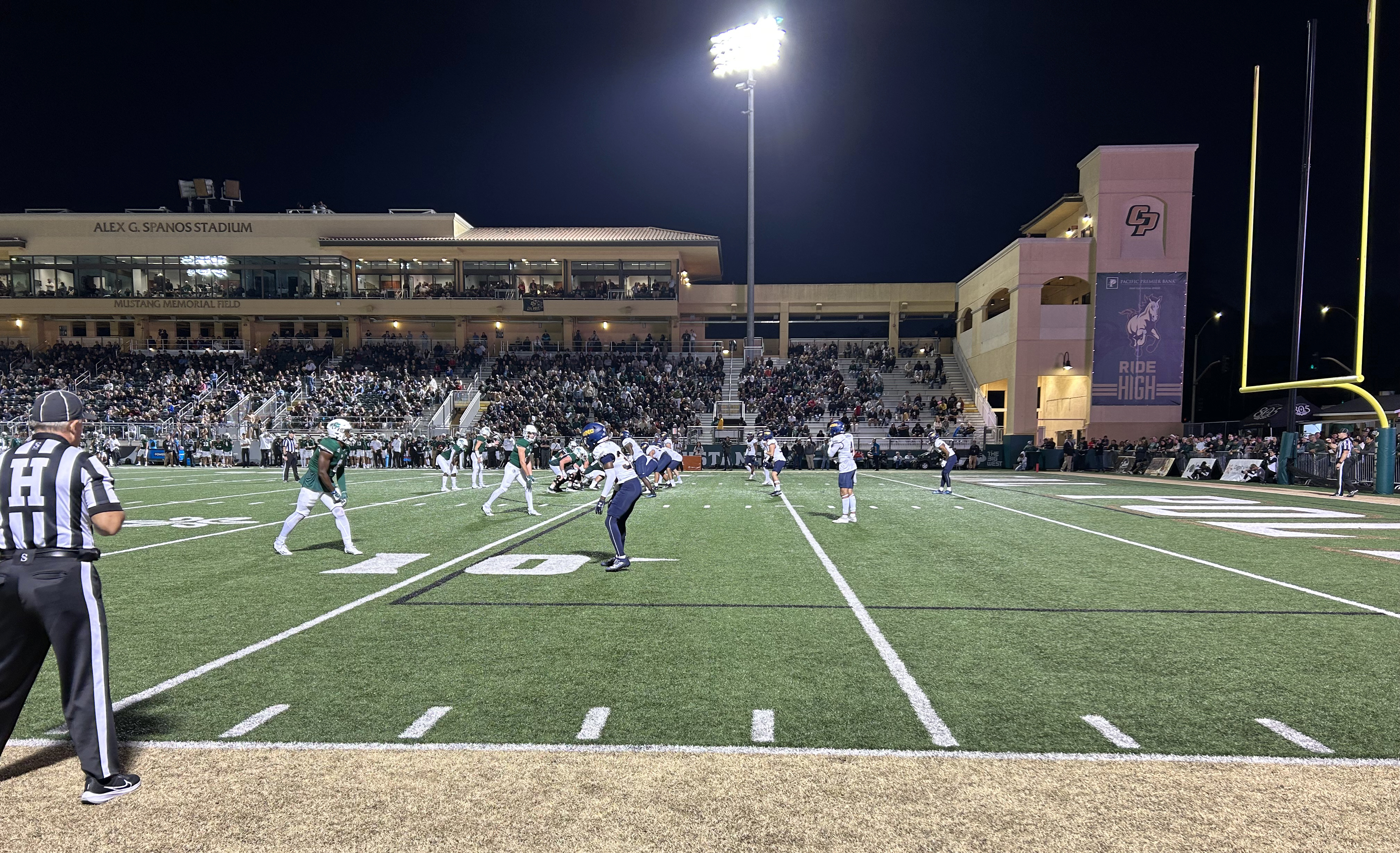
Cal Poly's offense prepares to snap the ball against the Northern Colorado defense during a 2023 Big Sky Conference home victory.

=== Conference memberships ===
- 1915–1921: Independent
- 1922–1924: California Coast Conference
- 1925–1945: Independent
- 1946–1981: California Collegiate Athletic Association
- 1982–1992: Western Football Conference
- 1993–1995: American West Conference
- 1996–2003: NCAA Division I–AA Independent
- 2004–2011: Great West Conference
- 2012–present: Big Sky Conference

== Championships ==
=== National championships ===
Season	Coach	Selectors	Record	Bowl
1980	Joe Harper	Division II	10–3	Won Division II Championship
National Championships			1	

=== Conference championships ===
Year	Coach	Conference	Overall record	Conference record
1952	LeRoy Hughes	California Collegiate Athletic Association	7–3	4–0
1953	LeRoy Hughes	California Collegiate Athletic Association	9–0	5–0
1958†	LeRoy Hughes	California Collegiate Athletic Association	9–1	4–1
1969	Joe Harper	California Collegiate Athletic Association	6–4	2–0
1970	Joe Harper	California Collegiate Athletic Association	8–2	3–0
1971	Joe Harper	California Collegiate Athletic Association	6–5	3–0
1972†	Joe Harper	California Collegiate Athletic Association	8–1–1	3–0
1973	Joe Harper	California Collegiate Athletic Association	9–1	4–0
1976	Joe Harper	California Collegiate Athletic Association	7–1–1	2–0
1977	Joe Harper	California Collegiate Athletic Association	6–4	2–0
1978	Joe Harper	California Collegiate Athletic Association	7–3	2–0
1979	Joe Harper	California Collegiate Athletic Association	7–3	2–0
1980	Joe Harper	California Collegiate Athletic Association	10–3	2–0
1982	Jim Sanderson	Western Football Conference	6–5	4–0
1990†	Lyle Setencich	Western Football Conference	10–2	4–1
1994	Andre Patterson	American West Conference	7–4	3–0
2004	Rich Ellerson	Great West Football Conference	9–2	4–1
2005†	Rich Ellerson	Great West Football Conference	9–4	4–1
2008	Rich Ellerson	Great West Football Conference	8–3	3–0
2011†	Tim Walsh	Great West Football Conference	6–5	3–1
2012†	Tim Walsh	Big Sky Conference	9–3	7–1
Conference championships			20	

† Co-champions

== Head coaches ==
No.	Coach	Tenure	Seasons	Record	Pct.	Bowls/playoffs	Conference titles
1	D. W. Schlosser	1915–1917	3	4–3–1	.563	0	0
2	Herman Hess	1919–1920	2	4–4	.500	0	0
3	Al Agosti	1921–1932	11	32–44–5	.425	0	0
4	Howie O'Daniels	1933–1941, 1946–1947	11	56–33–6	.621	0	0
5	Bob Dakan	1942	1	4–3	.571	0	0
6	Ron Henderson	1945	1	1–5–1	.167	0	0
7	Chuck Pavelko	1948–1949	2	7–11	.389	0	0
8	LeRoy Hughes	1950–1961	12	72–38–1	.647	0	2 (1952, 1953)
9	Sheldon Harden	1962–1967	6	17–42	.288	0	0
10	Joe Harper	1968–1981	14	96–43–4	.662	2 (1978, 1980)	10 (1969–1973, 1976–1980)
11	Jim Sanderson	1982–1986	5	26–27	.491	0	1 (1982)
12	Lyle Setencich	1987–1993	7	41–29–2	.583	1 (1990)	1 (1990)
13	Andre Patterson	1994–1996	3	17–16	.515	0	1 (1994)
14	Larry Welsh	1997–2000	4	19–25	.432	0	0
15	Rich Ellerson	2001–2008	8	56–34	.622	2 (2005, 2008)	3 (2004, 2005, 2008)
16	Tim Walsh	2009–2019	11	59–66	.472	2 (2012, 2016)	2 (2011, 2012)
17	Beau Baldwin	2020–2022	3	4–21	.160	0	0
18	Paul Wulff	2023–2025	3	10–24	.294	0	0
19	Tim Skipper	2026–present	1	0–0	–	0	0

== Division II Playoffs results ==
The Mustangs have appeared in the Division II playoffs three times with an overall record of 4–2. They were National Champions in 1980.

Year	Round	Opponent	Result
1978	Quarterfinals	Winston-Salem State	L, 10–17
1980	Quarterfinals; Semifinals; National Championship Game	Jacksonville State; Santa Clara; Eastern Illinois	W, 15–0; W, 38–14; W, 21–13
1990	First Round; Quarterfinals	Cal State Northridge; North Dakota State	W, 14–7; L, 0–47

== Division I-AA/FCS Playoffs results ==
The Mustangs have appeared in the I-AA/FCS playoffs four times with an overall record of 1–4.

Year	Round	Opponent	Result
2005	First Round; Quarterfinals	Montana; Texas State	W, 35–31; L, 7–14
2008	First Round	Weber State	L, 35–49
2012	Second Round	Sam Houston State	L, 16–18
2016	First Round	San Diego	L, 21–35

== Bowl games ==
Date	Bowl	Coach	Opponent	Result
December 9, 1972	Camellia Bowl	Joe Harper	North Dakota	L, 21–38

== Home stadiums ==
- 1915-1934

Various Sports Fields -San Luis Obispo, CA

- 1935-current

Mustang Memorial Field Presented by Dignity Health French Hospital Medical Center
Capacity (11,075)

Mustang Memorial Field, formerly known as Mustang Stadium and then Alex G. Spanos Stadium, is an 11,075-seat multi-purpose stadium on the campus of California Polytechnic State University (Cal Poly). It is the home field of the Cal Poly Mustangs football and soccer teams. The stadium was renovated largely from funding via the late Alex Spanos, a Cal Poly alumnus, American billionaire real estate developer, founder of the A. G. Spanos Companies, and then-majority owner of the Chargers of the National Football League (NFL).

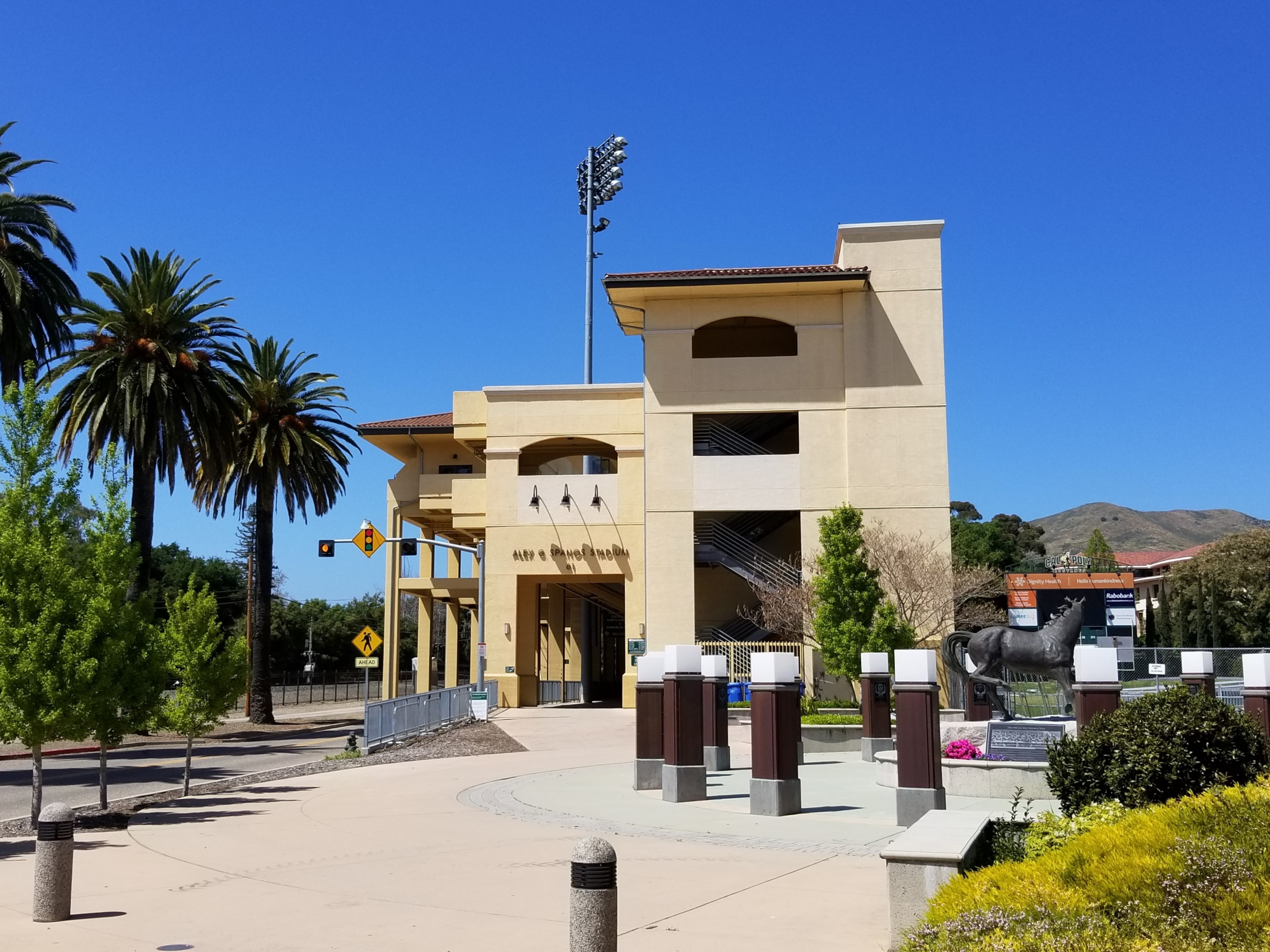
Alex G. Spanos Stadium grandstand

Originally opened 91 years ago in 1935 with a capacity of 8,500, the stadium was expanded in 2006 to its current capacity and, following the completion of a $21.5-million renovation, was then renamed Alex G. Spanos Stadium Previous expansions to the stadium's steel east-side grandstands were completed in 1972 and 1979. In 2013, Cal Poly replaced the south end zone rented stands with permanent aluminum stands improving handicapped access. Additionally, Cal Poly renovated the lower portion of the older east-side bleachers to add handicapped seats and improve accessibility and egress. The new south endzone stands increased capacity by 345 seats. Artist renderings of further increasing the stadium's capacity to 25,000 were released in 2010. The playing field is aligned north-northwest to south-southeast at an approximate elevation of three hundred feet (90 m) above sea level. Formerly natural grass, FieldTurf was installed in 2022. In November 2022, the university announced the facility would be renamed Mustang Memorial Field Presented by Dignity Health French Hospital Medical Center, reflecting a new 10-year naming rights agreement between the college and the healthcare organization.

== Rivalries and yearly matchup trophies ==
=== UC Davis ===
"Battle for the Golden Horseshoe"

Cal Poly's most prominent current rivalry in football is with in-state FCS opponent UC Davis, commemorated by the Battle for the Golden Horseshoe trophy. In the series dating to 1939, the Aggies hold the lead, 27–20–2.

=== Sacramento State ===
While not commemorated with a trophy, Cal Poly and Sacramento State are designated as 'protected rivals' in scheduling by the Big Sky Conference, meaning they are guaranteed to play each other in foreseeable schedules. From 1967 to 2024, the Mustangs and Hornets have met 43 times, as Cal Poly leads the series 22–21.

=== U. of San Diego ===
USD and Cal Poly have a regional rivalry, as both schools are in-state FCS opponents south of the Bay Area, despite residing in different conferences.

=== Fresno State ===
From 1956 to 1975, Cal Poly and Fresno State traded the Victory Bell trophy, which was donated to Cal Poly in 1952. The trophy, which weighed about 200 pounds, was ultimately retired due to repeated theft. The two programs didn't play each other from 1986 through 2009, but brought back matchups in 2010, 2013, 2021 and 2022. In the 46-game all-time series, Fresno State leads 34–10–2.

== Retired numbers ==
Cal Poly Mustangs retired numbers
No.	Player	Pos.	Tenure	No. ret.	Ref.
45	Osbaldo Orozco	LB	1996–1999	2003	
74	John Madden	DT	1957–1958	2026	

== Pro Football Hall of Fame inductees ==
Name	Position	Years	Inducted
John Madden	DT	1957–1958	2006
Bobby Beathard	QB	1956–1958	2018

== Professional alumni ==
=== All-Time NFL players ===
- Ramses Barden — Walter Payton Award finalist/WR, New York Giants
- Jordan Beck — Buck Buchanan Award winner/LB, Atlanta Falcons
- Alex Bravo — DB, Los Angeles Rams
- Courtney Brown — DB, Dallas Cowboys
- Seth Burford — QB, San Diego Chargers
- Sal Cesario — OL, Dallas Cowboys
- Jimmy Childs — WR, St. Louis (Arizona) Cardinals
- Josh Cuevas — TE, Baltimore Ravens
- Gary Davis — RB, Miami Dolphins
- Nick Dzubnar — LB, L.A. Chargers/Tennessee Titans
- Freddie Ford — RB, Buffalo Bills/L.A. Chargers
- Chris Gocong — Buck Buchanan Award winner/LB, Philadelphia Eagles
- Bob Howard — DB, San Diego Chargers/New England Patriots
- Asa Jackson — CB, Baltimore Ravens/Detroit Lions/San Francisco 49ers
- Louis Jackson — RB, New York Giants
- Perry Jeter — RB, Chicago Bears
- Damone Johnson — TE, Los Angeles Rams
- Mel Kaufman — LB, winner of two Super Bowl rings and Captain of Washington
- J. J. Koski — WR/ST, Los Angeles Rams
- Kamil Loud — WR, Buffalo Bills/Atlanta Falcons
- Robbie Martin — WR/KR, Detroit Lions/Indianapolis Colts
- LeCharls McDaniel — CB, Washington/Super Bowl XVII champion
- Don Milan — QB, Green Bay Packers
- Dana Nafziger — LB, Tampa Bay Buccaneers
- Kassim Osgood — Pro Bowl special teamer, San Diego Chargers
- Elijah Ponder — Edge/ST, New England Patriots
- David Richardson — DB, Jacksonville Jaguars
- Brian Roche — TE, San Diego Chargers
- Stan Sheriff — C/LB, Pittsburgh Steelers/San Francisco 49ers
- Paul Sverchek — DL, Minnesota Vikings
- Chris Thomas — WR, San Francisco 49ers/Kansas City Chiefs
- Cecil Turner — WR/KR, Chicago Bears
- James Tuthill — K, Washington
- Fred Whittingham — LB, New Orleans Saints

=== Canadian Football League players ===
- Alli Abrew — QB, Saskatchewan
- Vic Buccola — G, Saskatchewan
- Chris Coleman — WR, Hamilton
- Burton DeKoning — LB, Ottawa
- Chris Judge — Edge, 2019 CFL draft, 8th Rd. (71st pick) – Saskatchewan
- Gary Kerr — WR, Calgary; nominee for 1972 Rookie of the Year
- Pat McGuirk — DB, Winnipeg (also AFL/WLAF)
- Marty Mohamed — LB, Hamilton
- Cameron Ontko — LB, Calgary/Saskatchewan
- Steve Prejean — DE, Toronto
- Mark Restelli — LB, Edmonton/Montreal
- Chris Santini — OLB, Ottawa
- Jeff Smith — WR, Toronto (also USFL)
- Bob Trudeau — RB, Toronto
- Antonio Warren — RB, Calgary/BC
- Chris White — DL, Hamilton Tiger-Cats

=== NFL Preseason/Practice Squad/Mini-Camp veterans ===
- Michael Briscoe — WR, Minnesota Vikings
- Chris Brown — QB/WR, Dallas Cowboys
- Charles Daum — DT, Dallas Cowboys
- Sullivan Grosz — NT, Houston Texans
- Dominique Johnson — WR, Minnesota Vikings
- Chris Jones — FS, Dallas Cowboys
- Dustin Kroeker — OT, Seattle Seahawks/Detroit Lions/Rhein Fire (NFL Europe)
- Josh Letuligasenoa — OLB/DE, Green Bay Packers
- Rich Max — C, Oakland Raiders
- Johnny Millard — ILB, St. Louis Rams
- Brian Moore — C, San Francisco 49ers
- Patrick Moore — DT, Chicago Bears
- Joe Protheroe — RB/FB, San Francisco 49ers
- Marshall Samuels — DT, San Francisco 49ers
- Kyle Shotwell — Buck Buchanan Award recipient/ILB, Oakland Raiders/Indianapolis Colts
- Cole Stanford — WR/all-purpose, Kansas City Chiefs/New England Patriots
- Greg Thompson — DB, Denver Broncos
- Tre'dale Tolver — WR/PR, Cleveland Browns
- Garrett Weichman — OL, Indianapolis Colts
- Deonte Williams — RB, Oakland Raiders
- Scott Winnewisser — OT, New Orleans Saints

=== Additional pro alumni ===
- Andre Broadous — QB, Spokane/Tri-Cities (AFL)
- Jonathan Dally — QB, Danube (Austria)/Milano (Italian Football League)
- Mike Daum — OT, Oakland Invaders (USFL)
- Freddie Gaines — S/OLB, Bay Area Panthers (IFL)
- Adam Herzing — WR, Rhein Fire/Frankfurt Galaxy (NFL Europe)
- Vaughn Jarrett — CB, San Jose (AFL)
- Darrell Jones — WR/KR, Arizona (AFL)
- Kyle Lewis — WR/RB, San Diego Fleet (AAF)
- Dan Loney — OL, San Jose (AFL)
- Ryan Shotwell — DE, Sollerod (DAFF)
- Fred Stewart — OG, Honolulu (World Football League)

=== International Federation of American Football Team USA members ===
- Kenny Chicoine — S, 2007 World Championship gold medalist (Kawasaki, Japan)

=== Head coaching/football executive/athletics director alumni ===
- Marijon Ancich — FB/DB/LB, second-winningest high school football coach in CIF history behind Bob Ladouceur (De La Salle HS, Concord)
- Bobby Beathard — Hall of Fame general manager/executive, Washington/San Diego
- Carl Bowser — 1988 CCCAA championship-winning head coach for Bakersfield College/1996 Kern County Sports Hall of Fame inductee
- Jim Criner — 1980 Boise State championship-winning head coach/Las Vegas Outlaws (XFL) head coach
- John Madden — Oakland Raiders Super Bowl-winning head coach/Pro Football Hall of Fame inductee/Emmy Award-winning broadcaster/video game entrepreneur
- Tyler Mariucci — California Baptist athletics director
- Carl Smith — Seattle Seahawks associate head coach
- Gil Stork — CCCAA Board of Directors member
- Ted Tollner — USC/San Diego State head coach

=== Alumni in NFL media ===
- Cam Inman, San Francisco 49ers beat reporter/columnist for Bay Area News Group/author of The Best Bay Area Sports Arguments book

== "Pride of the Pacific" marching band routines ==
Cal Poly's band is a popular staple at home football games, performing a wide variety of halftime shows and postgame renditions, along with in-game music following first downs, touchdowns and significant defensive plays. On football gamedays, the band's rehearsals, for a playbook of roughly 70 charts, typically start at about 9 a.m. on campus. The band members take a Field Show Marching Skills class as part of their curriculum.

== Future non-conference opponents ==
Announced schedules as of August 27, 2026.

2026	2027	2028	2029	2030	2032
Central Washington	at Arizona State	San Diego	at San Diego	at San Jose State	at Wyoming
at San Jose State	at San Diego	at Fresno State	Stephen F. Austin		
San Diego					

== Externally links ==
- Official website
