= Kamil Loud =

American football player (born 1976)

No. 89, 80, 81
- Position: Wide receiver

Personal information
- Born: June 25, 1976 (age 50); Richmond, California, U.S.
- Listed height: 6 ft 0 in (1.83 m)
- Listed weight: 190 lb (86 kg)

Career information
- High school: Salesian Prep (Richmond)
- College: Cal Poly
- NFL draft: 1998: 7th round, 238th overall pick

Career history
- Buffalo Bills (1998–1999); Atlanta Falcons (2000)*; Pittsburgh Steelers (2000); Calgary Stampeders (2001–2002)
- * Offseason or practice squad member only

Awards and highlights
- Grey Cup champion (2001)

Career NFL statistics
- Receptions: 6
- Receiving yards: 66
- Return yards: 26
- Stats at Pro Football Reference

Kamil Kassam Loud (born June 25, 1976) is an American former professional football player who was a wide receiver for the Buffalo Bills of the National Football League (NFL). He played college football for the Cal Poly Mustangs. He also played in the Canadian Football League (CFL) for the Calgary Stampeders.

== Early life ==
Loud played quarterback and running back for three years at Salesian High, before ultimately graduating from El Cerrito High following his senior year, when he was recruited to Cal Poly San Luis Obispo by coach Andre Patterson.

== College career ==
Loud was selected as the Cal Poly Men's Athlete of the Year in May 1998 after setting school receiving records for career catches (170), yards (3,144) and touchdowns (26). He was a charter member of the university's first four seasons (1994-97) as an NCAA Division I-AA program, and as a senior helped lead the team to a 10-1 record and top-20 national ranking.

Loud, who also added 178 rushing yards and three rushing touchdowns on his 11 collegiate carries, was invited to the Hula Bowl all-star game in January 1998.

== Professional career ==
The Buffalo Bills selected Loud in the seventh round of the 1998 NFL draft.

As a rookie, Loud caught a 12-yard pass from Doug Flutie in Buffalo's 24-17 loss at Miami in the wild card round of the AFC playoffs.

Loud later signed with the Atlanta Falcons, but was waived in August 2000. He went on to play for the Calgary Stampeders in the CFL from 2001 to 2002.
