= Perry Jeter =

American football player (1931–2019)

No. 21, 27
- Position: Halfback

Personal information
- Born: May 17, 1931; Brevard, North Carolina, U.S.
- Died: May 18, 2019 (aged 88); Steubenville, Ohio, U.S.
- Listed height: 5 ft 7 in (1.70 m)
- Listed weight: 178 lb (81 kg)

Career information
- High school: Steubenville
- College: Cal Poly (1953–1954)
- NFL draft: 1955: 26th round, 311th overall pick

Career history
- Chicago Bears (1956–1957); Wheeling Ironmen (1962-1964)

Career NFL statistics
- Rushing yards: 327
- Rushing average: 4.7
- Receptions: 7
- Receiving yards: 61
- Total touchdowns: 3
- Stats at Pro Football Reference

Perry Jeter (May 17, 1931 – May 18, 2019) was an American professional football halfback. He played for the Chicago Bears from 1956 to 1957.

Jeter died of Alzheimer's disease on May 18, 2019, in Steubenville, Ohio at age 88.

== Early life ==
Jeter graduated from Steubenville High School in Ohio. In a 1950 game against McKinley of Canton, Jeter scored on a 109-yard kickoff return, a still-standing record for the longest touchdown runback in Harding Stadium history.

== College career ==
Jeter transferred to Cal Poly San Luis Obispo from San Bernardino Valley College. While attending SBVC, Jeter earned junior college All-American accolades as a sophomore.

In December 1955, Jeter was nominated for the Pop Warner Award. Combined from his three seasons with Cal Poly, Jeter finished with 260 carries for 1,740 rushing yards, along with 31 all-purpose touchdowns and numerous point-after conversions.

== Professional career ==
Jeter was selected by the Bears in the 26th round of the 1955 NFL draft, with the 311th overall pick.

Chicago executive George Halas commented in 1956: "Jeter is a very elusive runner with good speed. He's a great punt returner and is terrific in the open field."

He went on to play for the Wheeling Ironmen in the United Football League from 1962 to 1963.

== Career statistics ==
=== NFL ===
NFL statistics
Season	Team	GP	Rush Att.	Yds.	Avg.	LG	TD	PR	Yds.	Avg.	LG	TD	KR	Yds.	Avg.	LG	TD
1956	CHI	7	60	316	5.3	51	2	6	66	11.0	51t	1	5	105	21.0	26	0
1957	CHI	9	10	11	1.1	7	0	2	3	1.5	3	0	3	62	20.7	28	0
Career		16	70	327	4.7	51	2	8	69	8.6	51t	1	8	167	20.9	28	0

=== College ===
College statistics
Season	School	Rush. att.	Rush yds.	Avg.	Punt ret. LG	Overall points
1951	SBVC (Fr.)	100	1,096	10.9	85t	108
1952	SBVC (JV)	n/a	n/a	n/a	n/a	70
1953	Cal Poly (So.)	74	543	7.3	n/a	89
1954	Cal Poly (Jr.)	125	877	7.0	93t	78
1955	Cal Poly (Sr.)	61	320	5.2	n/a	36
Totals	Combined	360	2,836	7.9	93t	381
