= Robbie Martin =

American football player (born 1958)

No. 83, 31, 88
- Positions: Wide receiver, return specialist

Personal information
- Born: December 3, 1958 (age 67); Los Angeles, California, U.S.
- Listed height: 5 ft 8 in (1.73 m)
- Listed weight: 179 lb (81 kg)

Career information
- High school: Villa Park (Villa Park, California)
- College: Cal Poly
- NFL draft: 1981: 4th round, 100th overall pick

Career history
- Pittsburgh Steelers (1981)*; Detroit Lions (1981–1984); Indianapolis Colts (1985–1986)
- * Offseason or practice squad member only

Career NFL statistics
- Receptions: 13
- Receiving yards: 196
- Total touchdowns: 3
- Stats at Pro Football Reference

Robbie Martin (born December 3, 1958) is an American former professional football player who was a wide receiver and kick returner in the National Football League (NFL). Martin played college football for the Cal Poly Mustangs and was selected by the Pittsburgh Steelers in the fourth round of the 1981 NFL draft. He played for the Detroit Lions from 1981 to 1984 and the Indianapolis Colts from 1985 to 1986.

== College career ==
While playing for the Cal Poly Mustangs, Martin was the MVP of the Division II Championship Football Game (the "Zia Bowl") in 1980, when he scored three touchdowns. Two TDs were by pass receptions of 58 and 38 yards, respectively, and another touchdown came on a punt return of 50 yards, leading Cal Poly to win its first national title in football.

Martin set a then-career receiving record of 117 catches for 2,449 yards, averaging 21 yards per catch with 19 touchdowns. Martin also set punt return records, returning five for touchdowns his senior year.

Martin was awarded the Athlete of The Year Award for Cal Poly in 1981, earned Kodak All-American Honors his senior year in 1980, and was inducted into the athletic hall of fame for Cal Poly University in 2005.

He graduated from Cal Poly SLO with a B.S. degree in business administration.

== Professional career ==
Martin is the all-time leading single-season punt return yardage leader for the Indianapolis Colts, setting the record in 1985 with 443 total punt return yards. He also holds the single-season record for most punt returns at 52 returns for 450 yards for the Detroit Lions in 1981 during his rookie year.

As of 2022, Martin ranked 61st in NFL history for career punt-return yardage, with 1,670 yards. He also ranks 119th all-time in the NFL for combined punt and kick return yardage, with 3,754 yards.

Martin returned three punts for touchdowns in the NFL, with the longest being 81 yards versus the Pittsburgh Steelers on Thanksgiving Day in 1983 in front of roughly 77,000 in attendance at the Pontiac Silverdome. Martin also returned punts for touchdowns against the Minnesota Vikings (for 45 yards) in his rookie season of 1981 and against the Miami Dolphins (70 yards) while a Colt in 1985.

During the last game of his rookie season in 1981 against the Tampa Bay Buccaneers, Martin suffered an injury to his big toe joint which required a then-untested new surgical procedure. The surgery was successful enough that Martin was able to continue his career by changing his running style with only losing a little of his quickness and foot speed. Martin consistently ranked among the top returners in the NFL during his six-year career.

In 1983, the Lions were the Central Division champions and played the San Francisco 49ers in the first round of the playoffs at Candlestick Park on New Year's Eve. The Lions lost 24–23 when their last-second field-goal kick went wide right.

Before the 1985 season, Martin was traded to the Colts. While with the Colts, he became a starting wide receiver and also handled all the kick and punt return duties. But midseason injuries forced Martin to concentrate primarily on returns. During the 1986 season, Martin suffered several injuries to his foot and was eventually put on the injured reserve. He retired in 1987 due to the injuries suffered during the prior year.

== Punt return statistics ==
=== Detroit Lions ===
Year	Returns	Yards	Average	Touchdowns
1981	52	450	8.7	1
1982	26	275	10.6	0
1983	15	183	12.2	1
1984	25	210	8.4	0

=== Indianapolis Colts ===
Year	Returns	Yards	Average	Touchdowns
1985	40	447	11.1	1
1986	17	109	6.4	0

== Personal life ==
In April 1985, Martin was arrested and charged with assault with a deadly weapon, burglary and felony vandalism on a man he found with his estranged wife. Martin admitted to attacking both the car and the house of the victim; he was found to have punched the windows of the car and attacked it with a machete. He was sentenced to two years of probation.
