= Gary Davis (American football) =

American football player (born 1954)

No. 27, 28
- Position: Running back

Personal information
- Born: September 7, 1954 (age 72); Los Angeles, California, U.S.
- Listed height: 5 ft 10 in (1.78 m)
- Listed weight: 202 lb (92 kg)

Career information
- High school: Garey (Pomona, California)
- College: Cal Poly
- NFL draft: 1976: 6th round, 174th overall pick

Career history
- Miami Dolphins (1976–1979); Tampa Bay Buccaneers (1980–1981); Cleveland Browns (1981)

Career NFL statistics
- Rushing attempts: 324
- Rushing yards: 1,410
- Rushing TDs: 7
- Stats at Pro Football Reference

Gary Curtis Davis (born September 7, 1954) is an American former professional football player who was a running back in the National Football League (NFL). He was selected by the Miami Dolphins in the sixth round of the 1976 NFL draft and also played for the Tampa Bay Buccaneers and Cleveland Browns. He played college football for the Cal Poly Mustangs.

== College career ==
At Cal Poly, Davis led the California Collegiate Athletic Association in rushing yardage as a junior and senior, and was selected for All-CCAA accolades twice. He majored in social sciences. In his final season of 1975, Davis also was chosen for United Press International 'Little All-Coast Team' status.

=== Statistics ===
College statistics
Season	Rush att.	Rush yds.	Avg.	LG	Rush. TD
1973 (So.)	69	244	3.5	n/a	4
1974 (Jr.)	167	880	5.3	53	10
1975 (Sr.)	264	1,244	4.7	61	15
Totals	500	2,368	4.7	61	29

== Professional career ==
Davis ranks third all-time in Miami Dolphins history for single-season kickoff return average, averaging 29.6 yards per return in 1977.

In August 2022, Sports Illustrated ranked Davis as the third-greatest Dolphin to ever wear jersey number 27.
