= Louis Jackson (American football) =

NFL running back (born 1958)

No. 21, 31, 25
- Position: Running back

Personal information
- Born: January 27, 1958 (age 68); Fresno, California, U.S.
- Listed height: 5 ft 11 in (1.80 m)
- Listed weight: 195 lb (88 kg)

Career information
- High school: Roosevelt (Fresno)
- College: Cal Poly
- NFL draft: 1981: 7th round, 168th overall pick

Career history
- New York Giants (1981); Oakland Invaders (1983-1984); Portland Breakers (1985)

Career NFL statistics
- Rushing yards: 68
- Rushing average: 2.5
- Touchdowns: 1
- Stats at Pro Football Reference

Louis Bernard Jackson (born January 27, 1958) is an American former professional football player who was a running back for the New York Giants of the National Football League (NFL) in 1981. He played college football for the Cal Poly Mustangs.

== Early life ==
Jackson graduated from Roosevelt High in Fresno, California, where he earned All-Metro League honors.

== College career ==
At California Polytechnic State University, San Luis Obispo, Jackson majored in industrial arts. Following his 1980 senior season with the Mustangs, during which he carried 287 times for 1,424 rushing yards and 12 scores, Jackson was selected for AFCA Kodak All-American accolades, making a list merging both NCAA Division II and NAIA Division I schools at the time.

Collegiate statistics
	Rush. Att.	Rush. Yds.	Avg.	LG	Rush. TD
Totals	633	3,330	5.3	87	32

== Professional career ==
Jackson was selected 168th overall by the New York Giants in the seventh round of the 1981 NFL draft.

Wearing number 21, Jackson played in 11 games as a rookie for the Giants, including three starts. He rushed for 68 yards and a touchdown on 27 carries, and caught three passes for 25 yards. His lone touchdown came on a 4-yard run in the second quarter of a 30–27 loss to Washington on November 15.

After being released by the Giants in September 1982, Jackson went on to play three seasons in the USFL, first for the Oakland Invaders from 1983 to 1984 and then for the Portland Breakers in 1985.
