= Pete Riehlman =

American football player and coach (1933–2013)

Biographical details
- Born: December 10, 1933; Cortland, New York, U.S.
- Died: June 6, 2013 (aged 79); Paradise, California, U.S.

Playing career
- 1954–1955: Utah
- Position: Tackle

Coaching career (HC unless noted)
- 1956: Utah (freshmen line)
- 1957: Lander County HS (NV) (assistant)
- 1958: Los Altos HS (CA) (assistant)
- 1959–1962: San Lorenzo HS (CA) (assistant)
- 1963–1967: UC Santa Barbara (assistant)
- 1968–1973: Chico State
- c. 1974: The Hawaiians
- 1977–1980: Weber State
- 1989–1990: Colorado Springs Spirit

Head coaching record
- Overall: 56–48 (college)
- Bowls: 0–1

Accomplishments and honors

Championships
- 3 FWC (1970–1971, 1973)

Peter Houck Riehlman (December 10, 1933 – June 6, 2013) was an American football coach. He served as the head football coach at California State University, Chico from 1968 to 1973 and at Weber State University from 1977 to 1980, compiling a career college football coaching record of 56–48. Riehlman played college football for head coach Jack Curtice at the University of Utah as a tackle in 1954 and 1955, before graduating in 1956. He served as the freshman line coach at his alma mater in the fall of 1956. Riehlman was the head football coach at San Lorenzo High School in San Lorenzo, California from 1959 to 1962, before moving to University of California, Santa Barbara to work as an assistant for Curtice.

== Head coaching record ==
=== College ===
Year	Team	Overall	Conference	Standing	Bowl/playoffs	UPI^{#}
Chico State Wildcats (Far Western Conference) (1968–1973)
1968	Chico State	5–5	2–4	5th		
1969	Chico State	8–2	3–2	3rd		
1970	Chico State	8–3	3–1	T–1st		
1971	Chico State	9–2	5–1	T–1st	L Camellia	11
1972	Chico State	4–5	2–3	T–3rd		
1973	Chico State	7–3	4–1	T–1st		
Chico State:		41–20	21–12			
Weber State Wildcats (Big Sky Conference) (1977–1980)
1977	Weber State	4–6	2–4	T–4th		
1978	Weber State	4–7	2–4	T–5th		
1979	Weber State	3–8	3–4	T–4th		
1980	Weber State	4–7	4–4	T–4th		
Weber State:		15–28	11–16			
Total:		56–48				
National championship Conference title Conference division title or championship game berth
