= Randy Trautman =

American football player (1960–2014)

No. 70
- Position: Defensive lineman

Personal information
- Born: May 27, 1960; Caldwell, Idaho, U.S.
- Died: March 1, 2014 (aged 53); Oregon, U.S.
- Listed height: 6 ft 3 in (1.91 m)
- Listed weight: 249 lb (113 kg)

Career information
- High school: Caldwell
- College: Boise State
- NFL draft: 1982: 9th round, 238th overall pick

Career history
- 1982–1985: Calgary Stampeders

Awards and highlights
- NCAA Division I-AA national champion (1980)
- College Football Hall of Fame

Randall Ray Trautman (May 27, 1960 – March 1, 2014) was an American professional football player, a defensive lineman in the Canadian Football League (CFL) for the Calgary Stampeders.

Born and raised in Caldwell, Idaho, Trautman graduated from Caldwell High School in 1978 and accepted a wrestling scholarship to Boise State University. As a true freshman, he walked on the football team at BSU under head coach Jim Criner, then in the Big Sky Conference. Trautman had knee injuries in high school, which curbed the interest of Division I-A football programs and he never did wrestle for the Broncos. He and was a two-time college football All-American in 1980 and 1981, and the 1981 Big Sky Conference defensive player of the year. During his junior season at BSU in 1980, Trautman helped lead the Broncos to the Division I-AA national championship.

Selected in the ninth round of the 1982 NFL draft by the Washington Redskins, Trautman was cut late in training camp. He soon answered a call from the Calgary Stampeders as an injury replacement for three weeks, and then was offered a three-year contract. Trautman was a West Division All-Star in 1983 and 1984, but knee problems soon ended his playing career.

Trautman was inducted into the College Football Hall of Fame in 1999.

== Death ==
After fighting health issues over the years, Trautman died in his sleep at his cabin in Oregon on March 1, 2014, at the age of 53.
