= 1980 Montana Grizzlies football team =

American college football season

1980 Montana Grizzlies football
- Conference: Big Sky Conference
- Record: 3–7 (1–6 Big Sky)
- Head coach: Larry Donovan (1st season)
- Home stadium: Dornblaser Field

1980 Big Sky Conference football standings
	Conf.					Overall
Team	W		L		T	W		L		T
No. 7 Boise State $^	6	–	1	–	0	10	–	3	–	0
Idaho	4	–	3	–	0	6	–	5	–	0
Nevada	4	–	3	–	0	6	–	4	–	1
Idaho State*	4	–	4	–	0	6	–	5	–	0
Weber State*	4	–	4	–	0	4	–	7	–	0
Montana State	3	–	4	–	0	4	–	6	–	0
Northern Arizona	3	–	4	–	0	5	–	6	–	0
Montana	1	–	6	–	0	3	–	7	–	0
$ – Conference champion; ^ – NCAA Division I-AA playoff participant; * – Idaho State and Weber State met twice in league play with each game counting as a half game.; Rankings from NCAA Division I-AA AP Poll

The 1980 Montana Grizzlies football team represented the University of Montana in the 1980 NCAA Division I-AA football season as a member of the Big Sky Conference (Big Sky). The Grizzlies were led by first-year head coach Larry Donovan, played their home games at Dornblaser Field and finished the season with a record of three wins and seven losses (3–7, 1–6 Big Sky).

== Schedule ==
Date	Time	Opponent	Site	Result	Attendance	Source
September 13		Simon Fraser*	Dornblaser Field; Missoula, MT	W 60–27	6,500	
September 20		at Portland State*	Civic Stadium; Portland, OR	L 0–20	11,381	
September 27	11:30 a.m.	Idaho	Dornblaser Field; Missoula, MT (Little Brown Stein)	L 0–42	8,535	
October 4		at Boise State	Bronco Stadium; Boise, ID	L 10–44	20,453	
October 11		at No. 6 Weber State	Wildcat Stadium; Ogden, IT	L 21–38	14,071	
October 18		at Idaho State	ASISU MiniDome; Pocatello, ID	L 0–17	9,782	
October 25		Eastern Washington*	Dornblaser Field; Missoula, MT (rivalry)	W 42–7	6,000	
November 1		Montana State	Dornblaser Field; Missoula, MT (rivalry)	L 7–24	12,700	
November 8		Northern Arizona	Dornblaser Field; Missoula, MT	W 31–21	4,800	
November 15		at Nevada	Mackay Stadium; Reno, NV	L 7–10	7,311	
*Non-conference game; Rankings from AP Poll released prior to the game; All times are in Mountain time
