= 1980 Idaho Vandals football team =

American college football season

1980 Idaho Vandals football
- Conference: Big Sky Conference
- Record: 6–5 (4–3 Big Sky)
- Head coach: Jerry Davitch (3rd season)
- Offensive coordinator: Bill Tripp (3rd season)
- Offensive scheme: Veer
- Defensive coordinator: Leland Kendall (1st season)
- Base defense: 5–2
- Captain: Glen White (posthumous)
- Home stadium: Idaho Stadium

1980 Big Sky Conference football standings
	Conf.					Overall
Team	W		L		T	W		L		T
No. 7 Boise State $^	6	–	1	–	0	10	–	3	–	0
Idaho	4	–	3	–	0	6	–	5	–	0
Nevada	4	–	3	–	0	6	–	4	–	1
Idaho State*	4	–	4	–	0	6	–	5	–	0
Weber State*	4	–	4	–	0	4	–	7	–	0
Montana State	3	–	4	–	0	4	–	6	–	0
Northern Arizona	3	–	4	–	0	5	–	6	–	0
Montana	1	–	6	–	0	3	–	7	–	0
$ – Conference champion; ^ – NCAA Division I-AA playoff participant; * – Idaho State and Weber State met twice in league play with each game counting as a half game.; Rankings from NCAA Division I-AA AP Poll

The 1980 Idaho Vandals football team represented the University of Idaho in the 1980 NCAA Division I-AA football season. The Vandals were led by third-year head coach Jerry Davitch and were members of the Big Sky Conference. They played their home games at the Kibbie Dome, an indoor facility on campus in Moscow, Idaho.

With freshman transfer quarterback Ken Hobart running the veer offense, the Vandals were 6–5 overall and 4–3 in the Big Sky to tie for second. Idaho lost to rival Boise State for the fourth straight year. BSU won the Big Sky title in 1980 and competed in the four-team Division I-AA playoffs; the Broncos won the finals over defending champion Eastern Kentucky.

It was the first winning season for the Vandals since 1976 and only the fourth winning record for the football program in over four decades. In early October at 3–1, Idaho was ranked ninth in their first-ever appearance in a national Associated Press poll.

== Notable players ==
Transfer quarterback Ken Hobart from Kamiah was a four-year starter. He quickly adjusted from an option quarterback in the veer under Davitch to a prolific passer under new head coach Dennis Erickson in 1982. He led the Vandals to a 9–4 record in 1982 and an 8–3 record in 1983 as a fifth-year senior, when he was a Division I-AA All-American. Hobart played a season in the USFL with Jacksonville in 1984 and several in the CFL.

Sophomore linebacker Sam Merriman from Tucson, Arizona, was selected in the seventh round (177th overall) of the 1983 NFL draft by the Seattle Seahawks. A four-year starter for the Vandals, he played five seasons with Seattle, primarily on special teams. He was a probable starter in 1988, but a serious knee injury in a preseason game (on a punt return in overtime) ended his playing career.

== Fallen teammate ==
Glen White was the Vandals' leading rusher during his junior season in 1979, the best season by a UI running back in the 1970s. He missed the opener, but gained 889 yards and averaged 5.0 yards per carry in the final ten games as the team finished at 4–7.

While in off-season training in February, White felt weakness and was sent to Seattle for further testing. Diagnosed with aplastic anemia, he battled it for several months until his death from complications on August 9 at an Oklahoma City hospital, near his parents' home at Fort Sill. White, age 22, was posthumously designated an honorary team captain for all eleven games, and the Vandals wore his number 32 on the left side of their helmets during the 1980 season.

== Schedule ==
Date	Time	Opponent	Rank	Site	Result	Attendance	Source
September 13	7:30 pm	at Pacific (CA)*		Pacific Memorial Stadium; Stockton CA	L 13–24	15,000	
September 20	7:30 pm	Simon Fraser*		Kibbie Dome; Moscow, ID	W 56–16	11,500	
September 27	12:30 pm	at Montana		Dornblaser Field; Missoula, Montana (Little Brown Stein)	W 42–0	8,535	
October 4	7:30 pm	Portland State*		Kibbie Dome; Moscow, ID	W 37–27	13,000	
October 11	6:30 pm	at Boise State	No. 9	Bronco Stadium; Boise, ID (rivalry)	L 21–44	21,812	
October 18	1:30 pm	Montana State^{†}		Kibbie Dome; Moscow, ID	W 14–6	15,000	
October 25	7:30 pm	at San Jose State*		Spartan Stadium; San Jose, CA	L 10–32	7,263	
November 1	7:30 pm	Weber State		Kibbie Dome; Moscow, ID	W 31–6	11,000	
November 8	7:30 pm	Idaho State		Kibbie Dome; Moscow, ID (rivalry)	L 21–28	12,000	
November 15	7:30 pm	Northern Arizona		Kibbie Dome; Moscow, ID	W 14–7	10,000	
November 22	12:00 pm	at Nevada		Mackay Stadium; Reno, NV	L 7–38	9,000	
*Non-conference game; ^{†}Homecoming; Rankings from AP Poll released prior to the game; All times are in Pacific time

== Roster ==
1980 Idaho Vandals football team roster
Players
Coaches
Offense

Pos.	#	Name	Class
SE	7	Jack Klein	Jr
QB	9	Ken Hobart	Fr
QB	11	Mark Vigil	Fr
RB	3	Russell Davis	Jr
RB	35	Wally Jones	So
RB	33	Terry Idler	So
RB		Tim Payne	So
QB, SE		Ben Bubak	Jr
FL		Curtis Johnson	So
SE		John Palumbo	Sr
TE		Tom Coombs	Jr
LT	62	Steve Seman	So
LG		Dave Monico	Sr
C		Pat Hills	Sr
RG		John Girnt	Sr
RT	74	Bruce Fery	Jr

Defense

Pos.	#	Name	Class
CB	41	Greg Jennings	Jr
FS		Ray McCanna	Sr
SS	25	Kelly Miller	Jr
CB		Carlton McBride	Sr
LB	52	Sam Merriman	So
LB		Larry White	Fr
DE		Jay Hayes	Jr
DT	63	Dave Frohnen	Jr
NG		Steve Nelson	Jr
DT	75	Monty Elder	Sr
DE	44	Frank Moreno	Fr
DE	43	Larry Barker	Sr
DE	90	Lloyd Williamson	So

Special teams

Pos.	#	Name	Class
PK	6	Pete O'Brien	Jr
P		Chris Brockman	Sr

Head coach

- Jerry Davitch (3rd year)

Coordinators/assistant coaches

- Bill Tripp (OC)
- Leland Kendall (DC)
- Ray Groth (OB)

Legend

- (C) Team captain
- (S) Suspended
- (I) Ineligible
- Injured
- Redshirt

== All-conference ==
Tackle Bruce Fery was the only Vandal on the first team; second team selections were running back Russell Davis, defensive end Larry Barker, linebacker Sam Merriman, cornerback Carlton McBride, and placekicker Pete O'Brien. Honorable mention picks included quarterback Ken Hobart, tight end Tom Coombs, defensive end Jay Hayes, safety Kelly Miller, and punter Chris Brockman.

== NFL draft ==
No Vandals were selected in the 1981 NFL draft, which lasted 12 rounds (332 selections). Two Vandal juniors were later selected in the 1982 NFL draft, also 12 rounds (334 selections).

Player	Position	Round	Overall	Franchise
Tom Coombs	TE	7th	181	New York Jets
Russell Davis	RB	11th	305	Cincinnati Bengals
