= Dwain Painter =

American football player and coach (born 1942)

Biographical details
- Born: February 13, 1942 (age 84); Monroeville, Pennsylvania, U.S.

Playing career
- 1960–1963: Rutgers
- Positions: Quarterback, defensive back

Coaching career (HC unless noted)
- 1965–1970: Wall HS (NJ)
- 1971–1972: San Jose State (assistant)
- 1973: San Mateo (assistant)
- 1974: BYU (QB/WR)
- 1975: BYU (QB)
- 1976–1978: UCLA (QB/WR)
- 1979–1981: Northern Arizona
- 1982–1985: Georgia Tech (OC)
- 1986: Texas (OC)
- 1987: Illinois (OC)
- 1988–1991: Pittsburgh Steelers (WR)
- 1992–1993: Indianapolis Colts (WR)
- 1994–1996: San Diego Chargers (QB)
- 1997: Denver Broncos (OA)
- 1998–1999: Dallas Cowboys (WR)
- 2001–2004: Frankfurt Galaxy (OC/QB/WR)

Head coaching record
- Overall: 16–17 (college); 29–18–1 (high school)

Dwain Painter (born February 13, 1942) is an American former football coach. He served as the head football coach at Northern Arizona University from 1979 to 1981, compiling a record of 16–17. He was also an assistant coach at both the college and professional levels.

== Head coaching record ==
=== College ===
Year	Team	Overall	Conference	Standing	Bowl/playoffs
Northern Arizona Lumberjacks (Big Sky Conference) (1979–1981)
1979	Northern Arizona	7–4	3–4	T–4th	
1980	Northern Arizona	5–6	3–4	T–6th	
1981	Northern Arizona	4–7	2–5	6th	
Northern Arizona:		16–17	8–13		
Total:		16–17			
