= 1980 Weber State Wildcats football team =

American college football season

1980 Weber State Wildcats football
- Conference: Big Sky Conference
- Record: 4–7 (4–4 Big Sky)
- Head coach: Pete Riehlman (4th season)
- Home stadium: Wildcat Stadium

1980 Big Sky Conference football standings
	Conf.					Overall
Team	W		L		T	W		L		T
No. 7 Boise State $^	6	–	1	–	0	10	–	3	–	0
Idaho	4	–	3	–	0	6	–	5	–	0
Nevada	4	–	3	–	0	6	–	4	–	1
Idaho State*	4	–	4	–	0	6	–	5	–	0
Weber State*	4	–	4	–	0	4	–	7	–	0
Montana State	3	–	4	–	0	4	–	6	–	0
Northern Arizona	3	–	4	–	0	5	–	6	–	0
Montana	1	–	6	–	0	3	–	7	–	0
$ – Conference champion; ^ – NCAA Division I-AA playoff participant; * – Idaho State and Weber State met twice in league play with each game counting as a half game.; Rankings from NCAA Division I-AA AP Poll

The 1980 Weber State Wildcats football team represented Weber State College—now known as Weber State University—as a member of the Big Sky Conference during the 1980 NCAA Division I-AA football season. Led by Pete Riehlman in his fourth and final season as head coach, the Wildcats compiled an overall record of 4–7 with a mark of 4–4 in conference play, tying for fourth place in the Big Sky. Weber State played home games at Wildcat Stadium in Ogden, Utah.

== Schedule ==
Date	Time	Opponent	Rank	Site	Result	Attendance	Source
September 13		at Northern Iowa*		UNI-Dome; Cedar Falls, IA	L 10–31	12,158	
September 20		Idaho State		Wildcat Stadium; Ogden, UT	W 21–17	11,031	
September 27		No. 6 Nevada		Wildcat Stadium; Ogden, UT	W 10–0	12,366	
October 4		Montana State		Wildcat Stadium; Ogden, UT	W 12–7	11,847	
October 11		Montana	No. 6	Wildcat Stadium; Ogden, UT	W 38–21	14,071	
October 18		at Northern Arizona		Walkup Skydome; Flagstaff, AZ	L 7–32	9,188	
October 25	7:30 pm	at No. 7 Boise State		Bronco Stadium; Boise, ID	L 0–24	18,455	
November 1	8:00 pm	at Idaho		Kibbie Dome; Moscow, ID	L 6–31	11,000	
November 8		Utah State*^{†}		Wildcat Stadium; Ogden, UT	L 13–50	12,202	
November 15		at Idaho State		ASISU Minidome; Pocatello, ID	L 5–46		
November 22		at Portland State*		Civic Stadium; Portland, OR	L 0–75	6,890	
*Non-conference game; ^{†}Homecoming; Rankings from NCAA Division I-AA Football Committee Poll released prior to the game; All times are in Mountain time

== Roster ==
1980 Weber State Wildcats football team roster
Players
Coaches
Offense

Pos.	#	Name	Class
WR	41	Eric Allen	Jr
WR, P	82	Curt Miller	Jr

Defense

Pos.	#	Name	Class
LB		Mike Humiston

Special teams

Pos.	#	Name	Class
K	19	Roger Ruzek	So

Head coach

- Pete Riehlman

Coordinators/assistant coaches

Legend

- (C) Team captain
- (S) Suspended
- (I) Ineligible
- Injured
- Redshirt
