= Cedric Minter =

American gridiron football player (born 1958)

Profile
- Position: Running back

Personal information
- Born: November 13, 1958 (age 67); Charleston, South Carolina, U.S.

Career information
- High school: Borah (Boise, Idaho)
- College: Boise State
- NFL draft: 1981: undrafted

Career history
- 1981–1983: Toronto Argonauts
- 1984–1985: New York Jets
- 1986: Toronto Argonauts
- 1987: Ottawa Rough Riders

Awards and highlights
- Grey Cup champion (1983); Frank M. Gibson Trophy (1981); 2× CFL All-Star (1981, 1982); NCAA Division I-AA national champion (1980)
- Stats at Pro Football Reference

Cedric Alwyn Minter (born November 13, 1958) is an American former professional football player, a running back in the Canadian Football League (CFL). After his playing career, Minter became an educator and is currently a junior high school assistant principal in Boise, Idaho.

== Early life ==
Born into a military family in Charleston, South Carolina, Minter moved with his family to Mountain Home Air Force Base in southwestern Idaho in 1959, when he was a few months old. A year later the family moved to nearby Boise, where he grew up and played his high school football in the mid-1970s for Borah High School under head coach Delane "De" Pankratz. Minter had outstanding seasons for the Lions as a sophomore and junior; the Lions went undefeated in 1975 and Minter had the attention of the top college football programs. But after incurring a shoulder injury on the first play of his senior season in September 1976, the attention rapidly subsided. Oregon and Kansas were still interested, but only Boise State in his hometown was interested in him as a 170 lb (77 kg) running back.

== College career ==
Minter graduated from high school in 1977 and accepted a football scholarship to Boise State University (BSU), and became a two-time All-American under head coach Jim Criner. Minter made his mark early as a freshman with a school record 210 yards against Cal Poly. As a sophomore, he set a Big Sky record by rushing with 1,526 yards in 1978. As a senior, he was a member of BSU's "Four Horseman" backfield (along with QB Joe Aliotti, FB David Hughes, and HB Terry Zahner), which led the 1980 Broncos to the Division I-AA championship. BSU defeated the Grambling Tigers, 14–9, in the first round (semifinals) at Bronco Stadium, then edged favored Eastern Kentucky, 31–29, with a late touchdown in the 1980 NCAA Division I-AA Football Championship Game played in Sacramento on December 20.

Minter finished his college career with 4,475 rushing yards, but as an undersized Big Sky running back (5 ft 10 in (1.78 m), 190 lb (86 kg)), he went unselected in the 1981 NFL draft, then twelve rounds (332 selections). Minter began his professional football career in the Canadian Football League in 1981, and graduated from BSU with a bachelor's degree in elementary education in 1985.

== Professional career ==
Minter signed with the Toronto Argonauts of the CFL in April 1981, and played three seasons, rushing for 815, 563, and 599 yards. He was awarded the Frank M. Gibson Trophy as best rookie in the East in 1981, and was an all star in 1981 and 1982. Minter's finest moment came in 1983, when with only minutes remaining in the 71st Grey Cup game, he scored a touchdown on a Joe Barnes pass to win the game and end the Argonauts' long championship drought, their last Grey Cup victory coming 31 years earlier in 1952.

After three seasons in Canada, Minter played two seasons in the NFL with the New York Jets. He played a total of 9 games and scored two touchdowns in 1984 and 1985. Minter rushed for 159 yards, caught 11 passes, and returned punts and kickoffs. He returned to Toronto in 1986, played in 4 games and rushed for 170 yards. After a brief stint with the Ottawa Rough Riders in 1987, Minter retired from pro football.

== After football ==
After his playing days, Minter became an educator in 1988. He taught and coached in southwest Idaho in Middleton and at Capital High School in Boise, and then coached the running backs at Boise State for a season in 1992 under head coach Skip Hall. He returned to teaching (and high school coaching) in 1993 in southeast Oregon in Nyssa and earned a master's degree in 1995 from Northwest Nazarene College. Minter has worked in the Boise School District since 2001, and is currently the assistant principal at Fairmont Junior High School.
