= Tacoma Dome =

Multi-purpose arena in Tacoma, Washington

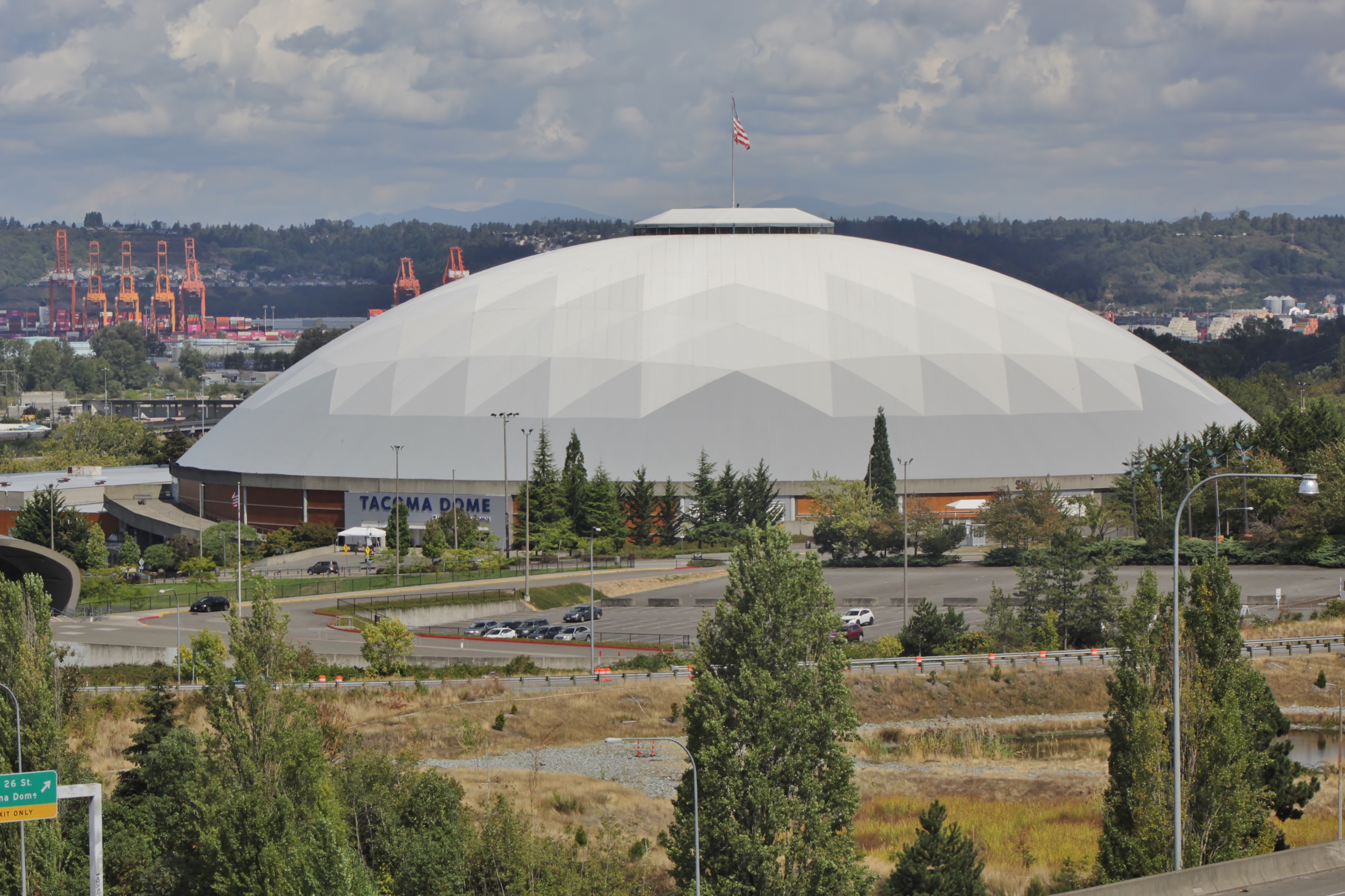
- The arena viewed from the Pacific Avenue overpass, 2024
- Address: 2727 East D Street; Tacoma, Washington; 98421
- Coordinates: 47°14′12″N 122°25′36″W
- Owner: City of Tacoma
- Operator: Venues & Events Department
- Capacity: 21,000 Detailed capacity: Indoor Soccer: 20,824; Basketball: 20,722; Hockey: 19,106; Football: 10,000
- Public transit: Amtrak; Sounder commuter rail Link light rail at Tacoma Dome Station

Construction
- Groundbreaking: July 1, 1981
- Opened: April 21, 1983
- Renovated: 2018
- Cost: $44 million ($156 million in 2025 dollars)
- Architect: McGranahan Messenger Associates
- General contractor: Merit Co.

Tenants
- Tacoma Stars (MISL) (1983–1992); Tacoma Rockets (WHL) (1991–1995); Seattle SuperSonics (NBA) (1994–95); Tacoma Sabercats (WCHL) (1997–2002); NCAA Division I Women's Basketball Championship (1989–90); Seattle Sounders (USL First Division) (1994); WIAA state football tournament (1995–2019); WIAA boys' state basketball tournament (2001–present, partial schedule)

Website
- www.tacomadome.org

The Tacoma Dome is an indoor multi-purpose arena in Tacoma, Washington, United States. It is located south of Downtown Tacoma, adjacent to Interstate 5 and Tacoma Dome Station. It is currently used for basketball tournaments by the Washington Interscholastic Activities Association (WIAA), concerts, and other community events. In its early years, it was primarily used as a venue for minor league ice hockey and indoor soccer, and later temporarily hosted professional teams from Seattle.

The first professional team to play at the arena was the Tacoma Stars, an indoor soccer team in the original MISL from 1983 to 1992. They were followed by a temporary stay for the Seattle SuperSonics during the 1994–95 NBA season while KeyArena was renovated. The Seattle Sounders of the American Professional Soccer League played on a full-size pitch at the Tacoma Dome during part of their inaugural season in 1994.

== History ==
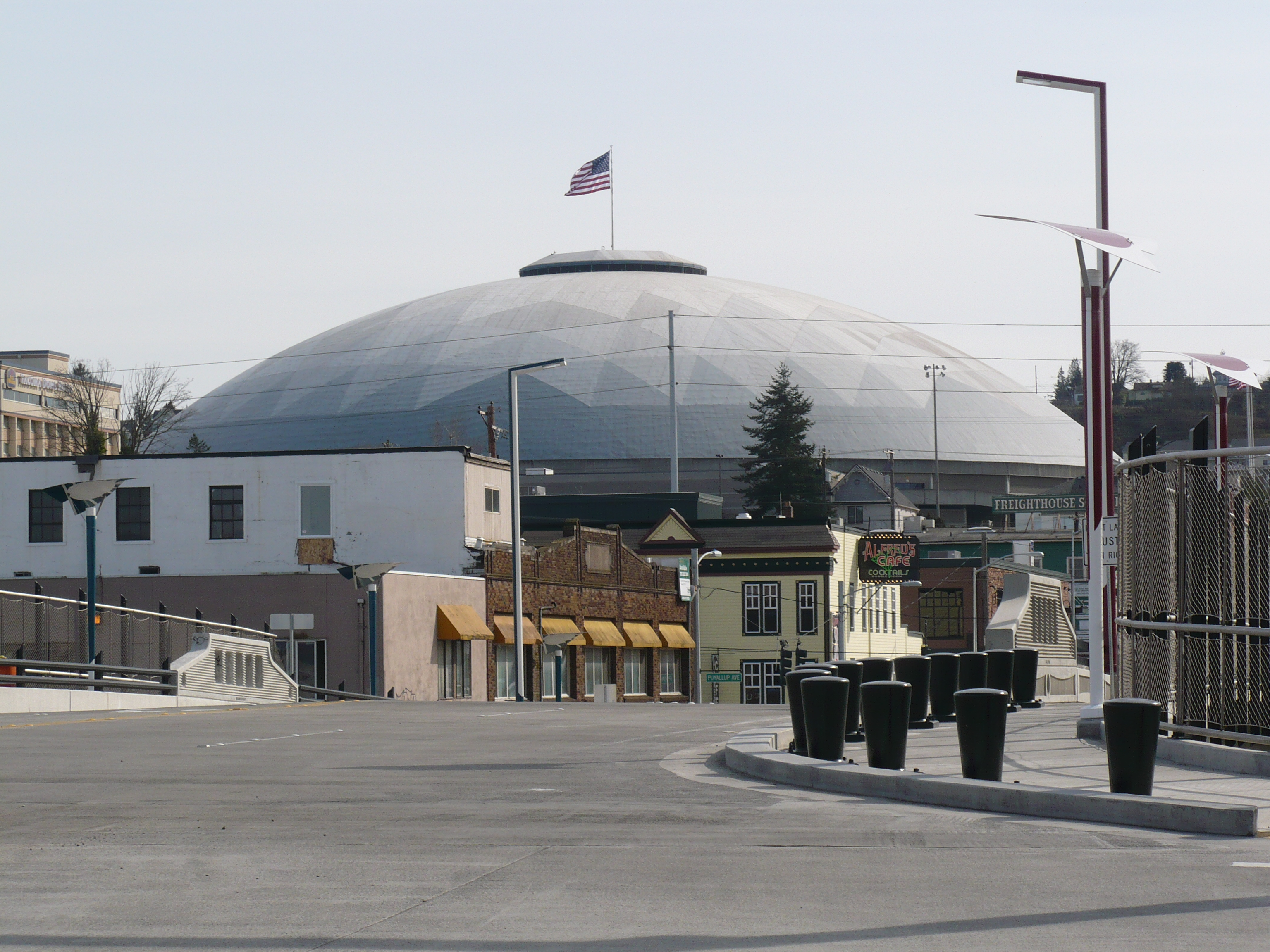
View of the arena from East D Street, 2009

Proposals to build a domed stadium in Tacoma were submitted to voters in various ballot measures in 1967, 1972, and 1976, but were all rejected. Following the completion of the Kingdome in Seattle, campaigners in Tacoma pushed for "a dome of our own"; a 1980 vote on a $28 million bond measure was approved and funded the construction of the Tacoma Dome. Construction began on July 1, 1981, at a site near Interstate 5; sites near Cheney Stadium and in downtown were also considered. The city planned to lure a National Hockey League team to the new stadium, but were unable to find a professional sports team to occupy the dome. It was designed by local architects Jim McGranahan and Lyn Messenger, who won an international design competition, and cost $44 million to construct. It opened on April 21, 1983, with 25,000 people attending the opening ceremonies.

At 530 feet (160 m) in diameter and 152 feet (46 m) in height, the arena seats 20,722 for basketball games, with a maximum capacity of 21,000. It was the largest arena with a wooden dome in the world by volume at the time of its opening; the Superior Dome in Marquette, Michigan, opened in 1991 with a larger-diameter geodesic dome at 536 feet (163 m), but is 143 feet (44 m) high and seats a maximum of 16,000. The dome's roof weighs 1.44 million pounds (650 t); some of the planks that form the roof were sourced from felled timber following the 1980 eruption of Mount St. Helens.

Unlike most other arenas of its size, the arena contains little in the way of fixed seating, so as to maximize the flexibility of the seating arrangements and the shape of the playing field. It can also host American football, albeit with seating reduced to 10,000.

The stadium's turf was replaced in 1992 and 2006. The stadium has not had a professional team as a tenant since 2002, attributed in part to the lack of amenities and luxury boxes, while a newer arena in Kent hosts the Seattle Thunderbirds of the WHL and the reincarnation of the Tacoma Stars. Several new performing venues in the area, including KeyArena and the White River Amphitheatre, also lured away touring artists who would have used the Dome.

A report to the city in 2000 identified the need for private suites, larger concourses, and modern locker and dressing rooms as key issues for the Dome. A $42 million renovation plan, which included a new "grand entrance", larger concessions, a loading dock, and luxury suites, was proposed by a city-contracted consultant in 2004. A bond issue to fund the renovation, which would require 60 percent of voters in favor, was approved in September 2005 but failed to meet the minimum turnout to validate the election. A second attempt in the February 2006 special election failed after receiving only 55 percent approval.

During a Monster Jam event at the Tacoma Dome in January 2009, a piece of debris from a truck flew into the stands during a freestyle performance, killing a 6-year-old spectator and injuring another spectator. This is so far the only fatality to occur at a Monster Jam event.

On February 2, 2016, the Tacoma Dome started new security procedures in light of its sold-out AC/DC concert. The new enhancements included metal detector wands at each entrance, a bag size restriction, the prohibition of backpacks, and the search of all bags before entry. In November 2016, the City of Tacoma approved a two-year, $21.3 million renovation project. The renovations took place over the summer of 2018, with the cost rising to $30 million, and were completed on October 8, 2018. The renovations cost $32 million; among the new features were wider seats throughout the arena, showgoers having 6 inches of extra legroom and replacing the bench seating in the upper level.

== Concerts ==
The dome's first event was a concert by American singer/actor Rick Nelson and the Stone Canyon Band as part of the Dome's opening festivities on April 24, 1983.

The Grateful Dead played at the Dome on August 26, 1988 as part of their Northwest Tour for that year.

== Tenants ==
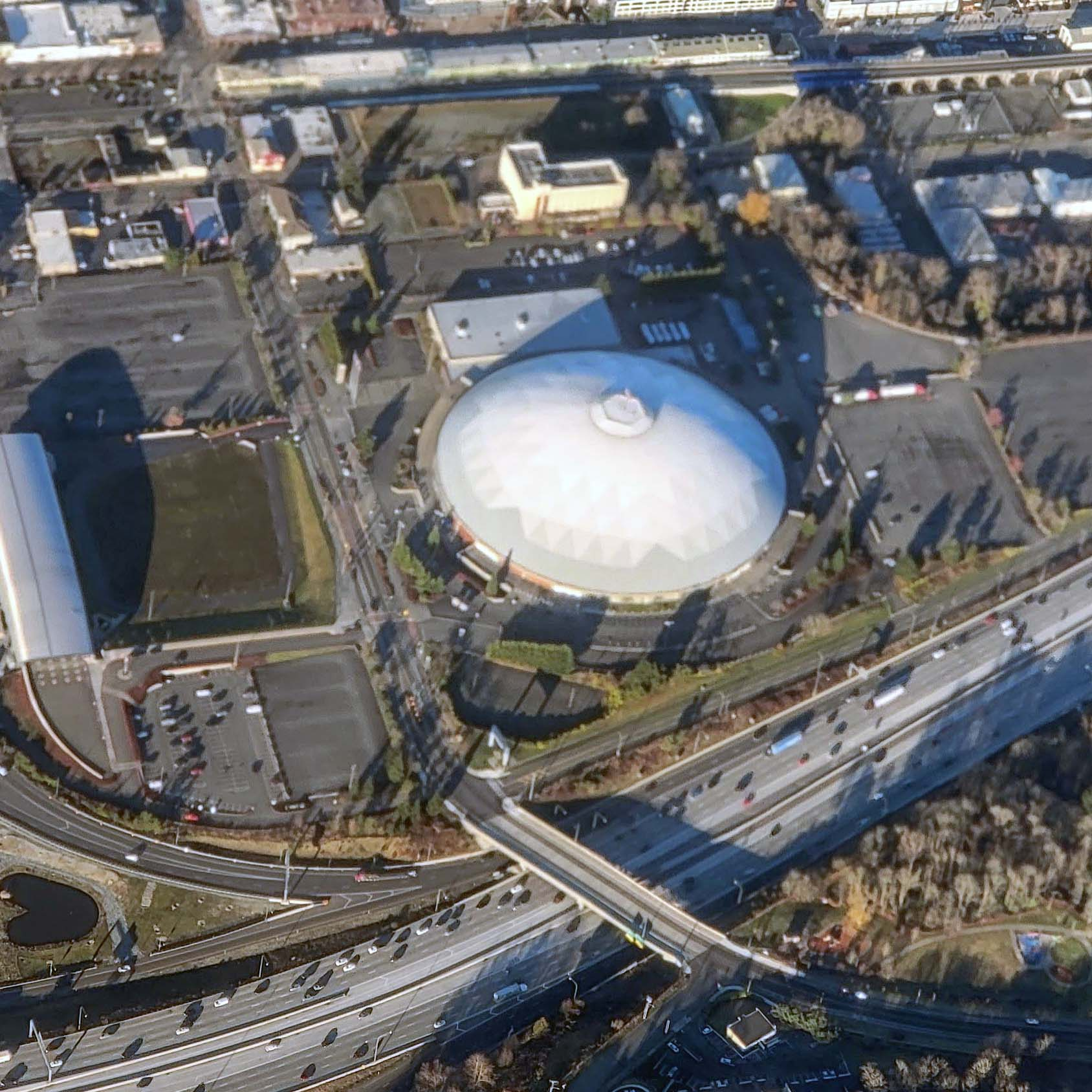
Aerial view of the Tacoma Dome in 2022

=== Indoor soccer ===
The first professional team to move into the Tacoma Dome were the Tacoma Stars of the Major Indoor Soccer League (MISL); the stadium was the largest in the league, with seating for 20,284 in its indoor soccer configuration. The seventh and final game of the 1987 MISL Championship Series was played in front of 21,728 spectators at the Tacoma Dome, setting a league attendance record. The Dome also hosted the 1988 MISL All-Star Game on February 17, 1988, which drew 17,241 in attendance.

=== Soccer ===
The first professional soccer game to be played at the Tacoma Dome was a EuroPac Cup match between the Seattle Sounders and Internacional from Brazil. The Sounders lost 2–1 in front of 6,340; the stadium's capacity was set at 19,000 for soccer. The team also bid for a lease to play their indoor season at the Dome, but lost to the Tacoma Stars.

The final match of the 1986 College Cup, the NCAA championship tournament for men's soccer, was hosted at the Tacoma Dome on December 13, 1986. The Duke Blue Devils won 1–0 against the Akron Zips and clinched their first national title in front of 4,652 spectators. The turf surface at the Dome was uneven and patched with electrical tape; it was later criticized as "no place to play a championship game" by Akron coach Steve Parker and "dangerous" by Duke midfielder Joey Valenti.

The second-division Seattle Sounders played several soccer matches at the Dome during their inaugural season in the American Professional Soccer League in 1994 before moving to Memorial Stadium in Seattle.

=== Basketball ===
The championship game of the NCAA Division I women's basketball tournament (known as the Women's Final Four) was hosted at the Tacoma Dome in 1988 and 1989. The latter was the first to be played in the same metropolitan area as the men's Final Four, which was hosted by the Kingdome in Seattle.

The Seattle SuperSonics played their first exhibition game at the Tacoma Dome on October 9, 1983, and lost 117–98 to the Portland Trail Blazers. The stadium was configured with a maximum capacity of 22,000 for NBA games. The team played four regular season games in Tacoma during the 1983–84 season and averaged 11,852 in attendance, greater than in the Kingdome. The Sonics played four regular season games at the Dome during the 1984–85 season, but announced in April 1985 that they would not return for the following season to focus on their move to the Seattle Center Coliseum.

The Sonics relocated to Tacoma for 41 home games during the 1994–95 season while the Seattle Center Coliseum underwent extensive renovations to become KeyArena (now Climate Pledge Arena). On April 29, 1995, during the fourth quarter of a playoff game against the Los Angeles Lakers, a power surge caused the main lights in the stadium to fail. The game was paused for 24 minutes while generators and backup systems kept most areas lit until electricity was restored. The Dome was later used for Sonics games during other seasons and was offered by the city as a replacement for KeyArena during the team's relocation negotiations in 2006. The Seattle Storm of the WNBA played an exhibition game at the Tacoma Dome in 2002 and a playoff game in 2013 that had been moved from KeyArena due to a scheduling conflict.

=== 1990 Goodwill Games ===
The Dome was also the venue of ice hockey, gymnastics, and figure skating events during the 1990 Goodwill Games.

=== American football ===
It was the site of the NCAA Division I-AA football championship game in 1985 and 1986. The venue also hosted Seattle Seahawks scrimmages and an annual rivalry game between Pacific Lutheran University and the University of Puget Sound, both based in the Tacoma area. A trophy for the rivalry game, unveiled in 2021, depicts the Tacoma Dome and the city skyline.

The short-lived Tacoma Express, a semi-professional American football team playing in the Minor League Football System, played an exhibition game against the Moscow Bears of the Soviet Union American Football League on July 2, 1990. The Express won 61–0 against the Bears, whose roster included rugby players and track-and-field athletes, in front of 1,303 spectators; it was the first time that a Soviet Union football team had played in the United States. The team had planned to play their regular season games at the Tacoma Dome, but were unable to afford the venue and moved to the Stadium Bowl.

=== Ice hockey ===
Several professional and junior ice hockey teams have also played at the Tacoma Dome. The Tacoma Rockets of the WHL played at the Dome from 1991 to 1995, but relocated to Kelowna, British Columbia, after finding the stadium unsuitable. The Tacoma Sabercats of the WCHL debuted on November 1, 1997, at the Dome, which underwent minor renovations to better accommodate ice hockey. The main grandstand's first three rows were raised to improve sightlines, the Plexiglass barrier around the rink was replaced with seamless glass panels, and seating capacity was reduced to 9,500. The Sabercats had strong attendance, but ceased operations in 2002.

The Tacoma Dome also hosted National Hockey League preseason exhibition games in 1983, 1984, 1988, 1992, and 1996. Plans to attract an NHL team to the venue were made in the 1980s and 1990s, but were unsuccessful.

=== Lacrosse ===
The Premier Lacrosse League played four games at the Tacoma Dome over a two-day weekend in August 2022 as part of their fourth traveling season. The National Lacrosse League had previously considered an expansion team at the Tacoma Dome in 2006, but also solicited other bids from arenas in the Puget Sound region.

=== High school sports ===
The Tacoma Dome has hosted the Washington state championships for high school basketball, organized by the Washington Interscholastic Activities Association (WIAA), since 1985; it was the first site nationwide to hold both boys' and girls' tournaments simultaneously. The WIAA also held the state championship games for high school football at the Tacoma Dome starting in 1995, having held the games at the Kingdome in Seattle beforehand; it elected to move the games out of the Tacoma Dome in 2019, citing rising costs and diminished sight lines inflicted by the 2018 renovations.

=== Motorsports ===
On August 10, 1986, the Tacoma Grand Prix (part of the NASCAR Winston West Series) was hosted on a temporary street course that ran 1.5 miles (2.4 km) around the Tacoma Dome. Hershel McGriff won the race. NASCAR returned in 1987, where Chad Little won the event.

The circuit also hosted other divisions such as Formula Atlantic, SCCA Sports 2000, vintage car racing, and the Formula Russell series.

== Art and design ==
The city government allocated $280,000 from the construction budget of the Tacoma Dome to furnish the arena with public art under its percent for art program. Among the five finalists was Andy Warhol's adaption of his Flowers series, which would have painted a single orange flower on the roof. The city's art commission endorsed a proposal by sculptor Stephen Antonakos to install abstract, neon-lit shapes on the dome's roof. It was rejected by the city council in April 1982 due to concerns about the neon tubes's effects on the wooden roof and public outcry over the design.

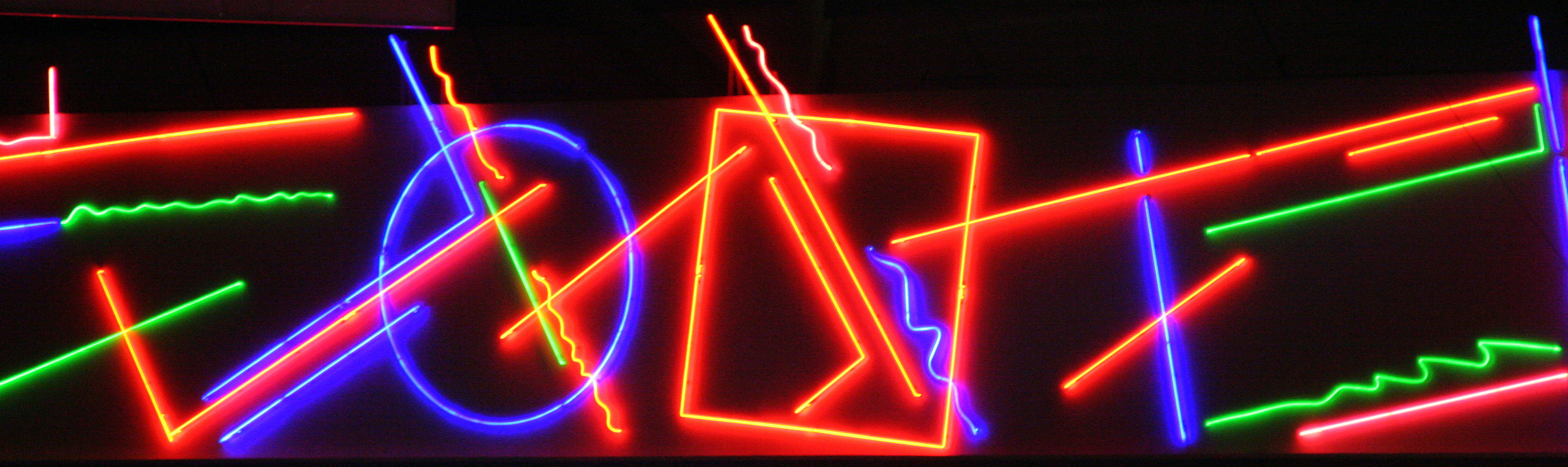
Neon light art installation inside the Tacoma Dome designed by Stephen Antonakos.

A modified version of Neons for the Tacoma Dome, consisting of four indoor panels that measure up to 72 feet (22 m) with abstract shapes in neon, was announced in early 1984. The city council approved the purchase of Neons, but a public opposition group named "No Neon" petitioned the Pierce County Superior Court for an injunction to halt further spending on the commission. The injunction was denied and the group instead gathered signatures to decide the issue in a citywide election. Neons was installed over the Tacoma Dome's southeast and northeast exits and unveiled to the public on July 31, 1984.

During the primary election on September 18, 74 percent of voters rejected an advisory question that would have endorsed the use of Antonakos's artwork in the Tacoma Dome. The city council voted in December to approve the installation of Neons, but allow tenants to decide whether to light the sculpture. The percent for arts ordinance was repealed by voters in the November 1985 election.

The chosen rooftop design was created by the structure's lead architect Lyn Messenger. The repeating blue triangular pattern was designed to reduce the apparent height of the dome, while also echoing the image of Mount Rainier.

== Naming rights ==
The Tacoma city government considered selling the naming rights for the Dome on several occasions to pay for renovations or other amenities that would attract a major league team. In 2002, the city hired a consultant to explore naming rights deals for various public facilities, including the Tacoma Dome, that would fund repairs and renovations. A ten-year naming rights deal with Comcast or a local Toyota dealership was proposed the following year by the consultants after discussions with various companies. Comcast emerged as the frontrunner and offered $3.5 million for the ten-year term in addition to free advertising on cable television that would be of equivalent value. The company pulled out of the deal for the proposed "Comcast Dome" in December 2003, ahead of a city council vote and amid public backlash over the removal of "Tacoma" from its name.

An offer to sell naming rights to city-owned Tacoma Power for $1.25 million annually was rejected in 2009 after a search for a city-inclusive name. The city began soliciting new bids for a marketer in 2013 to search for naming rights sponsor, but the two submitted proposals were rejected for being too costly.

Preceded by Johnson Hagood Stadium	Host of the NCAA Division I-AA National Championship Game; 1985–1986	Succeeded by Minidome
Preceded by Kingdome	Host of the College Cup; 1986	Succeeded by Riggs Field
Preceded by Seattle Center Coliseum	Home of the Seattle SuperSonics; 1994–1995	Succeeded by KeyArena
