= Camellia Bowl (1961–1980) =

College football bowl games held in California

Camellia Bowl (defunct)
- NAIA Championship (1961–1963); NCAA College Division regional final (1964–1972); NCAA Division II championship (1973–1975); NCAA Division I-AA championship (1980)
- Stadium: Hughes Stadium
- Location: Sacramento, California
- Operated: 1961–1975, 1980

The Camellia Bowl was an annual college football postseason game in Sacramento, California, which is nicknamed the Camellia City. It was held sixteen times at Hughes Stadium, from 1961 through 1975, and once more in 1980.

== History ==
The Camellia Bowl was founded in March 1961, when the Sacramento City-County Chamber of Commerce voted unanimously to accept an offer from the National Association for Intercollegiate Athletics (NAIA) to move its championship game to the city. For the previous four years, the game had been known as the Holiday Bowl and was played in Saint Petersburg, Florida. The Camellia Bowl served as the NAIA Football National Championship game for three years.

After the transition from NAIA to NCAA affiliation, announced in January 1964, the game became one of four regional finals in the NCAA College Division. At the time, there were no playoffs at any level of NCAA football. For the smaller colleges and universities, as for the major programs, the national champion was determined by polls conducted by the leading news wire services. The intent of the bowl was to match the two best non-major teams from a region consisting of the Pacific Coast and Rocky Mountain states. The other three regional finals were the Tangerine (later Boardwalk), Pecan (later Pioneer), and Grantland Rice bowls.

When the College Division was subdivided into the current Division II and Division III in 1973, the NCAA made the Camellia Bowl the Division II football championship game. It served in this capacity for three seasons (1973 to 1975). After a four-year hiatus, the bowl returned in 1980 as the title game for NCAA Division I-AA (today's FCS).

Sacramento's Camellia Bowl Association signed a two-year deal to host the Division I-AA championship, but after the 1980 game drew just 8,157 fans and lost $21,659, game organizers appealed to the NCAA to cancel the contract. The NCAA agreed, and the I-AA title game was moved to the Pioneer Bowl in Wichita Falls, Texas, for 1981.

== Game results ==
Date	Winning team		Losing team		Playoff	Ref.
December 9, 1961	Pittsburg State	12	Linfield	7	NAIA Championship	
December 8, 1962	Central State (OK)	28	Lenoir–Rhyne	13	NAIA Championship	
December 14, 1963	Saint John's (MN)	33	Prairie View A&M	27	NAIA Championship	
December 12, 1964	Montana State	29	Sacramento State	7	NCAA College Division; Regional Final	
December 11, 1965	Cal State Los Angeles	18	UC Santa Barbara	10	NCAA College Division; Regional Final	
December 10, 1966	San Diego State	28	Montana State	7	NCAA College Division; Regional Final	
December 9, 1967	San Diego State	34	San Francisco State	6	NCAA College Division; Regional Final	
December 14, 1968	Humboldt State	29	Fresno State	14	NCAA College Division; Regional Final	
December 13, 1969	North Dakota State	30	Montana	3	NCAA College Division; Regional Final	
December 12, 1970	North Dakota State	31	Montana	16	NCAA College Division; Regional Final	
December 11, 1971	Boise State	32	Chico State	28	NCAA College Division; Regional Final	
December 10, 1972	North Dakota	38	Cal Poly	21	NCAA College Division; Regional Final	
December 15, 1973	Louisiana Tech	34	Western Kentucky	0	NCAA Division II Championship	
December 14, 1974	Central Michigan	54	Delaware	14	NCAA Division II Championship	
December 13, 1975	Northern Michigan	16	Western Kentucky	14	NCAA Division II Championship	
December 20, 1980	Boise State	31	Eastern Kentucky	29	NCAA Division I-AA Championship	

== See also ==
- List of college bowl games
