= 1980 Northern Arizona Lumberjacks football team =

American college football season

1980 Northern Arizona Lumberjacks football
- Conference: Big Sky Conference
- Record: 5–6 (3–4 Big Sky)
- Head coach: Dwain Painter (2nd season)
- Home stadium: Walkup Skydome

1980 Big Sky Conference football standings
	Conf.					Overall
Team	W		L		T	W		L		T
No. 7 Boise State $^	6	–	1	–	0	10	–	3	–	0
Idaho	4	–	3	–	0	6	–	5	–	0
Nevada	4	–	3	–	0	6	–	4	–	1
Idaho State*	4	–	4	–	0	6	–	5	–	0
Weber State*	4	–	4	–	0	4	–	7	–	0
Montana State	3	–	4	–	0	4	–	6	–	0
Northern Arizona	3	–	4	–	0	5	–	6	–	0
Montana	1	–	6	–	0	3	–	7	–	0
$ – Conference champion; ^ – NCAA Division I-AA playoff participant; * – Idaho State and Weber State met twice in league play with each game counting as a half game.; Rankings from NCAA Division I-AA AP Poll

The 1980 Northern Arizona Lumberjacks football team represented Northern Arizona University as a member of the Big Sky Conference during the 1980 NCAA Division I-AA football season. Led by second-year head coach Bud Hake, the Lumberjacks compiled an overall record of 5–6, with a mark of 3–4 in conference play, and finished tied for sixth in the Big Sky.

== Schedule ==
Date	Opponent	Site	Result	Attendance	Source
September 6	Texas A&I*	Walkup Skydome; Flagstaff, AZ	W 24–11		
September 13	at North Dakota State*	Dacotah Field; Fargo, ND	L 14–27	7,100	
September 20	Boise State	Walkup Skydome; Flagstaff, AZ	L 18–20	10,787	
September 27	at Cal State Fullerton*	Titan Field; Fullerton, CA	L 13–21	7,301	
October 4	Idaho State	Walkup Skydome; Flagstaff, AZ	W 38–13	15,555	
October 11	at Nevada	Mackay Stadium; Reno, NV	L 0–21	8,790	
October 18	Weber State	Walkup Skydome; Flagstaff, AZ	W 32–7	9,188	
October 25	at Montana State	Reno H. Sales Stadium; Bozeman, MT	W 27–24	7,121	
November 1	Northern Colorado*	Walkup Skydome; Flagstaff, AZ	W 30–13		
November 8	at Montana	Dornblaser Field; Missoula, MT	L 21–31	4,800	
November 15	at Idaho	Kibbie Dome; Moscow, ID	L 7–14	10,000	
*Non-conference game

== Roster ==
1980 Northern Arizona Lumberjacks football team roster
Players
Coaches
Offense

Pos.	#	Name	Class
QB	15	Scott Lindquist	So
WR	41	Pete Mandley	So
WR	5	Joe Taylor	Sr

Defense

Pos.	#	Name	Class

Special teams

Pos.	#	Name	Class

Head coach

- Dwain Painter

Coordinators/assistant coaches

Legend

- (C) Team captain
- (S) Suspended
- (I) Ineligible
- Injured
- Redshirt
