= 1980 Tennessee Tech Golden Eagles football team =

American college football season

1980 Tennessee Tech Golden Eagles football
- Conference: Ohio Valley Conference
- Record: 4–7 (1–6 OVC)
- Head coach: Don Wade (13th season)
- Home stadium: Tucker Stadium

1980 Ohio Valley Conference football standings
	Conf.					Overall
Team	W		L		T	W		L		T
No. 5 Western Kentucky $	6	–	1	–	0	9	–	1	–	0
No. T–10 Murray State	5	–	2	–	0	9	–	2	–	0
No. T–3 Eastern Kentucky ^	5	–	2	–	0	10	–	3	–	0
Austin Peay	5	–	2	–	0	7	–	4	–	0
Akron	2	–	4	–	1	3	–	7	–	1
Morehead State	2	–	5	–	0	4	–	7	–	0
Middle Tennessee	2	–	5	–	0	2	–	8	–	0
Tennessee Tech	1	–	6	–	0	4	–	7	–	0
$ – Conference champion; ^ – NCAA Division I-AA playoff participant; Rankings from Associated Press poll

The 1980 Tennessee Tech Golden Eagles football team represented Tennessee Technological University (commonly referred to as Tennessee Tech) as a member of the Ohio Valley Conference (OVC) during the 1980 NCAA Division I-AA football season. Led by 13th-year head coach Don Wade, the Golden Eagles compiled an overall record of 4–7, with a mark of 1–6 in conference play, and finished last in the OVC.

== Schedule ==
Date	Opponent	Site	Result	Attendance	Source
September 13	Western Carolina*	Tucker Stadium; Cookeville, TN	W 26–10	9,313	
September 20	at Northeast Missouri State*	Stokes Stadium; Kirksville, MO	W 28–20		
September 27	No. 1 Murray State	Tucker Stadium; Cookeville, TN	L 3–10	13,600	
October 4	at Tennessee–Martin*	Pacer Stadium; Martin, TN	W 30–28	7,750	
October 11	No. 7 (D-II) Jacksonville State*	Tucker Stadium; Cookeville, TN	L 3–7	8,000	
October 18	No. 4 Western Kentucky	Tucker Stadium; Cookeville, TN	L 17–28	11,600	
October 25	at Morehead State	Jayne Stadium; Morehead, KY	W 31–29		
November 1	at No. 7 (D-II) Troy State	Veterans Memorial Stadium; Troy, AL	L 3–52	8,100	
November 8	No. T–5 Eastern Kentucky	Tucker Stadium; Cookeville, TN	L 7–48	6,000	
November 15	at Austin Peay	Municipal Stadium; Clarksville, TN	L 10–13		
November 22	at Middle Tennessee	Tucker Stadium; Cookeville, TN	L 7–21		
*Non-conference game; Rankings from Associated Press Poll released prior to the game
