= 1980 NCAA Division I-AA Football Championship Game =

1980 NCAA Division I-AA Football Championship
- I-AA National Championship Game; Camellia Bowl
Boise State Broncos	Eastern Kentucky Colonels
(9–3)	(10–2)
Big Sky	Ohio Valley
31	29
Head coach: Jim Criner	Head coach: Roy Kidd
AP 7	AP 3
	1	2	3	4	Total
Boise State	0	14	10	7	31
Eastern Kentucky	3	7	6	13	29
- Date: December 20, 1980
- Season: 1980
- Stadium: Hughes Stadium
- Location: Sacramento, California
- Attendance: 8,157

United States TV coverage
- Network: ABC Sports

The 1980 NCAA Division I-AA Football Championship Game was a postseason college football game between the Eastern Kentucky Colonels and the Boise State Broncos. The game was played on December 20, 1980, at Hughes Stadium in Sacramento, California. The culminating game of the 1980 NCAA Division I-AA football season, it was won by Boise State, 31–29.

The game was also known as the Camellia Bowl, a name that had been used starting in 1961 for various NAIA and NCAA playoff games held in Sacramento. The Colonels, defending champions from 1979, became the first program to play in a second I-AA title game.

== Teams ==
The participants of the Championship Game were the finalists of the 1980 I-AA Playoffs, which began with a four-team bracket.

=== Eastern Kentucky Colonels ===
Eastern Kentucky finished their regular season with a 9–2 record (5–2 in conference); their losses were to Western Kentucky and Akron. Ranked third in the final AP Poll for I-AA, the Colonels were the at-large selection to the four-team playoff; they defeated Lehigh, the East selection, by a score of 23–20 to reach the final. This was the second appearance for Eastern Kentucky in a Division I-AA championship game, having won in 1979.

=== Boise State Broncos ===
Boise State finished their regular season with an 8–3 record (6–1 in conference); their conference loss was to Montana State, with non-conference losses to Southeastern Louisiana and Division II program Cal Poly. Ranked seventh in the final AP Poll for I-AA, the Broncos were the West selection to the playoff; they defeated Grambling State, the South selection, by a 14–9 score to reach the final. This was the first appearance for Boise State in a Division I-AA championship game.

== Game summary ==
Trailing 24–22 late in the fourth quarter, Eastern Kentucky scored a touchdown on a 60-yard pass completion with only 55 seconds left in the game, taking a 29–24 lead. Boise State then went 80 yards in 43 seconds for the final points of the game, winning 31–29.

Note: contemporary news reports listed attendance as 10,000; NCAA records indicate 8,157.

=== Scoring summary ===
Scoring summary

Quarter	Time	Drive			Team	Scoring information	Score	
Quarter	Time	Plays	Yards	TOP	Team	Scoring information	BSU	EKU
1					EKU	26-yard field goal by David Flores	0	3
2	7:43				BSU	Kipp Bedard 5-yard touchdown reception from Joe Aliotti, Kenrick Camerud kick good	7	3
2	3:35				EKU	Tony Braxton 7-yard touchdown run, Flores kick good	7	10
2	1:11				BSU	David Hughes 1-yard touchdown run, Camerud kick good	14	10
3	12:30		45		BSU	Cedric Minter 1-yard touchdown run, Camerud kick good	21	10
3		12	89		EKU	Chris Isaac 11-yard touchdown run, 2-point Jerry Parrish run failed	21	16
3	0:43				BSU	24-yard field goal by Camerud	24	16
4	11:15		14		EKU	Braxton 2-yard touchdown run, 2-point pass failed	24	22
4	0:55				EKU	David Booze 60-yard touchdown reception from Isaac, Flores kick good	24	29
4	0:12		80	0:43	BSU	Duane Dlouhy 14-yard touchdown reception from Aliotti, Camerud kick good	31	29
"TOP" = time of possession. For other American football terms, see Glossary of American football.							31	29

=== Game statistics ===
	1	2	3	4	Total
Broncos	0	14	10	7	31
Colonels	3	7	6	13	29

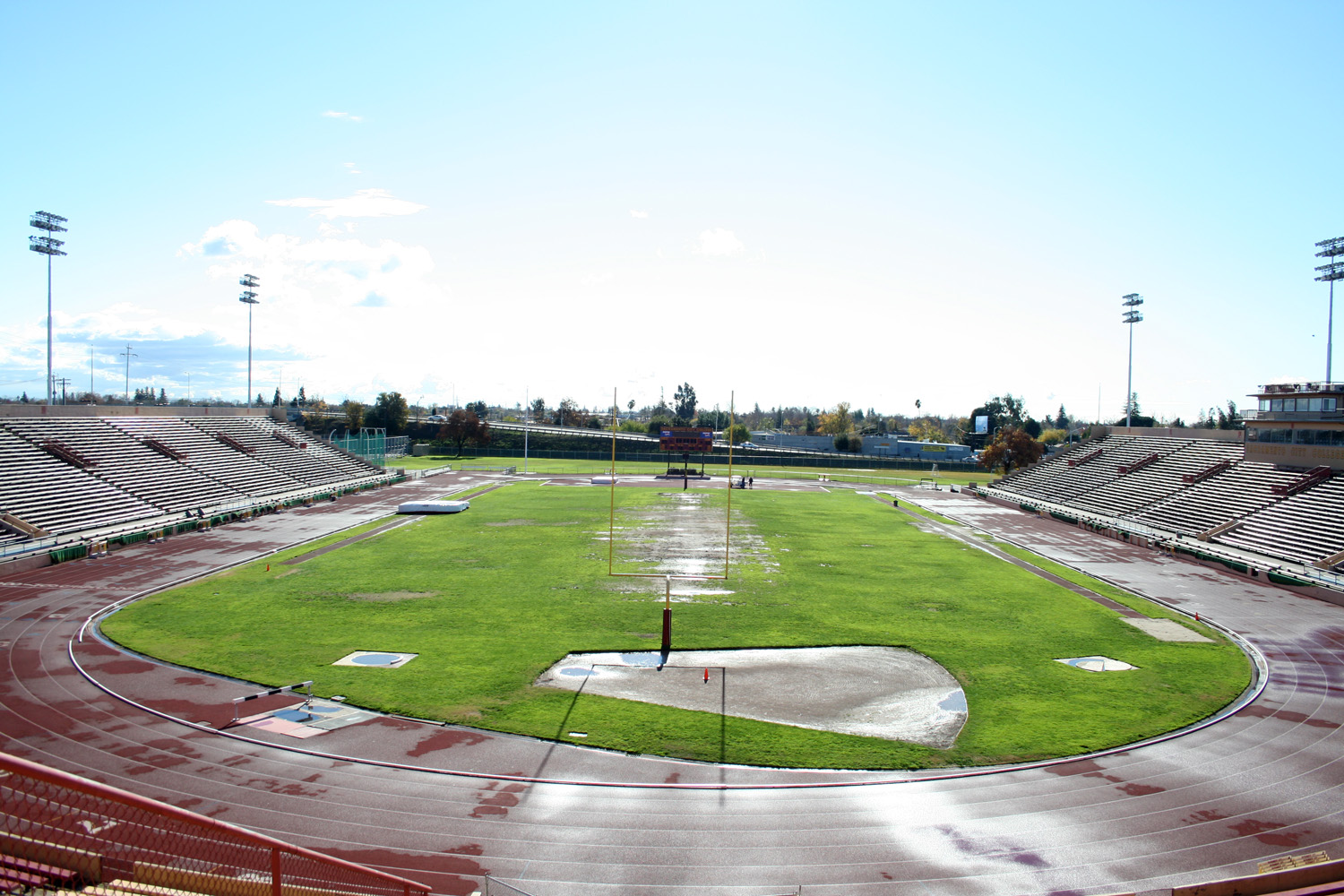
Hughes Stadium, site of the 1980 I-AA title game

Statistics	BSU	EKU
First downs	24	19
Plays–yards	86–510	74–397
Rushes–yards	45–152	49–147
Passing yards	358	250
Passing: comp–att–int	24–41–1	16–25–1
Time of possession		

Team	Category	Player	Statistics
Boise State	Passing	Joe Aliotti	24–41, 358 yds, 2 TD, 1 INT
Boise State	Rushing	Cedric Minter	22 car, 105 yds, 1 TD
Boise State	Receiving	Kipp Bedard	11 rec, 212 yds, 1 TD
Eastern Kentucky	Passing	Chris Isaac	16–25, 250 yds, 1 TD, 1 INT
Eastern Kentucky	Rushing	Dale Patton	9 car, 44 yds
Eastern Kentucky	Receiving	David Booze	8 rec, 105 yds, 1 TD

== See also ==
- 1980 NCAA Division I-AA football rankings
