= David Hughes (American football) =

American football player (born 1959)

No. 46, 36
- Position: Running back

Personal information
- Born: June 1, 1959 (age 67); Honolulu, Hawaii, U.S.
- Listed height: 6 ft 0 in (1.83 m)
- Listed weight: 220 lb (100 kg)

Career information
- High school: Kamehameha Schools (Honolulu, Hawaii)
- College: Boise State
- NFL draft: 1981: 2nd round, 31st overall pick

Career history
- Seattle Seahawks (1981–1985); Pittsburgh Steelers (1986)

Awards and highlights
- NCAA Division I-AA national champion (1980)

Career NFL statistics
- Rushing yards: 1,041
- Rushing average: 3.4
- Rushing touchdowns: 2
- Stats at Pro Football Reference

David Augustus Hughes III (born June 1, 1959) is an American former professional football player who was a running back for six seasons in the National Football League (NFL). He played college football for the Boise State Broncos and was selected by the Seattle Seahawks of the National Football League (NFL) in the second round of the 1981 NFL draft. He spent the first five season of his NFL career with the Seahawks (1981–1985) and the final one with the Pittsburgh Steelers. As a fullback, he was primarily a blocker, gaining just over 1,000 yards in his professional career.

== Early life ==
The son of David Hughes Jr. and Dorothy (Kim-Kruetter) Hughes, Hughes was born in Honolulu, Hawaii, and raised in Kailua, on the windward side of Oahu. He has two sisters (Debbie and Diane) and one brother (Dean). When Hughes was eleven, his father died.

Hughes said his father's death had an impact. "I fell away from my family," said Hughes. "In junior high and high school I got involved with drugs and alcohol. I thought I was pretty cool. But inside I was very unhappy."

Hughes attended the Kamehameha Schools in Honolulu and graduated in 1977. He was a standout athlete at Kamehameha, receiving letters in football, basketball, and track. In football, Hughes was a member of three consecutive Oahu Prep Bowl and Interscholastic League of Honolulu championship teams. As a senior in the fall of 1976, he was named football offensive player of the year for the state of Hawaii.

== Boise State ==
Hughes played college football at Boise State from 1977 to 1980, starting at fullback all four years and tallying 1,826 rushing yards (5.2 yards per carry). As a sophomore in 1978, he was named to the All Big Sky Conference first-team, and also received honorable mention on the AP Division II All-America team.

Hughes, quarterback Joe Aliotti, and halfbacks Cedric Minter and Terry Zahner were christened Boise's "Four Horsemen," and the quartet played key roles as seniors on the Broncos team that won the NCAA Division I-AA title in 1980. Minter and Hughes were also chosen to play in the 1980 East–West Shrine Game. Hughes is a member of the Boise State University Athletics Hall of Fame and in 2005 was named the first-team fullback on the Boise State Bronco 35 team, which honored the top BSU football players from 1970 to 2005.

== NFL career ==
In the 1981 NFL draft, Hughes was picked in the second round (31st overall) by the Seattle Seahawks. He was a member of the 1983 team that made it to the NFL playoffs for the first time in franchise history. He was second on the team in rushing that season with 327 yards. In his six years in the NFL, Hughes totaled 1,041 yards rushing, 864 yards receiving, and 663 yards in kickoff returns. He has seven career touchdowns. While playing for Pittsburgh in 1986, a knee injury ended his playing career.

== After football ==
In 1983, Hughes met Kalua Kaiahua from Napili and had a spiritual experience where there was an "opening the doors of faith in God". After his NFL career ended, Hughes became active in religious ministry. In 1994, he and his family returned to Idaho and settled in Eagle, adjacent to Boise. There he pursued his ministry and served as running backs coach for Eagle High School, the Class A-1 (Division II) state champions in 1998.

Hughes and his ohana (family) relocated to the Seattle area in 1999 to accept a position on staff at Antioch Bible Church in suburban Redmond. He also volunteered as an assistant football coach at Eastlake High School, where he taught his players the "highest values ... of sportsmanship, team play and doing [their] best in sports as in life." Hughes served as the Mission pastor for Antioch Bible Church (a non-denomination church) in Redmond for almost 14 years before stepping away to start a ministry in the inner city area of Seattle. He currently assists the football team at Rainier Beach High School, and still is in the weight room every day. His ministry, Paraclete 46, focuses on urban student athletes and their families in providing resources and guidance.

== Personal life ==
While a senior at Boise State University, Hughes married Holly Ann Mahealani Haleamau on February 14, 1981. They have five children: Lahela, Kela, Keoni, Kaniela, and I`okepa.

== Sources ==
- "David Hughes: Who's the most important person in your life?" TheGoal.com. 15 March 2004. http://www.thegoal.com/players/football/hughes_david/hughes_david.html
- Kaopuiki, Danny. "The David Hughes Story, from Football star to Ambassador of God…" Northwest Hawaii Times. Oct 2005. http://www.northwesthawaiitimes.com/kpoct05.htm
- Romero, Jose Miguel. "Catching up with David Hughes." The Seattle Times. 8 Nov. 2003. https://archive.seattletimes.com/archive/20031108/oldhawk08/catching-up-with-david-hughes
