= 1980 Murray State Racers football team =

American college football season

1980 Murray State Racers football
- Conference: Ohio Valley Conference
- Record: 9–2 (5–2 OVC)
- Head coach: Mike Gottfried (3rd season)
- Defensive coordinator: Frank Beamer (2nd season)
- Home stadium: Roy Stewart Stadium

1980 Ohio Valley Conference football standings
	Conf.					Overall
Team	W		L		T	W		L		T
No. 5 Western Kentucky $	6	–	1	–	0	9	–	1	–	0
No. T–10 Murray State	5	–	2	–	0	9	–	2	–	0
No. T–3 Eastern Kentucky ^	5	–	2	–	0	10	–	3	–	0
Austin Peay	5	–	2	–	0	7	–	4	–	0
Akron	2	–	4	–	1	3	–	7	–	1
Morehead State	2	–	5	–	0	4	–	7	–	0
Middle Tennessee	2	–	5	–	0	2	–	8	–	0
Tennessee Tech	1	–	6	–	0	4	–	7	–	0
$ – Conference champion; ^ – NCAA Division I-AA playoff participant; Rankings from Associated Press poll

The 1980 Murray State Racers football team represented Murray State University during the 1980 NCAA Division I-AA football season. Led by third-year head coach Mike Gottfried, the Racers compiled an overall record of 9–2 with a mark of 5–2 on conference play, and finished tied for second in the OVC.

== Schedule ==
Date	Opponent	Rank	Site	Result	Attendance	Source
September 6	Southeast Missouri State*		Roy Stewart Stadium; Murray, KY	W 19–6		
September 13	Youngstown State*		Roy Stewart Stadium; Murray, KY	W 24–6		
September 20	at Louisville*		Fairgrounds Stadium; Louisville, KY	W 13–9		
September 27	at Tennessee Tech	No. 1	Tucker Stadium; Cookeville, TN	W 10–3	13,600	
October 4	at Morehead State	No. 1	Jayne Stadium; Morehead, KY	W 30–6	5,000	
October 11	Tennessee–Martin*	No. T–1	Roy Stewart Stadium; Murray, KY	W 20–6		
October 18	Middle Tennessee	No. T–1	Roy Stewart Stadium; Murray, KY	W 38–6	16,300	
October 25	Akron	No. 1	Roy Stewart Stadium; Murray, KY	W 13–10	8,500	
November 1	at No. T–11 Eastern Kentucky	No. T–1	Hanger Field; Richmond, KY	L 14–24		
November 8	at Austin Peay	No. 8	Municipal Stadium; Clarksville, TN	L 0–24		
November 22	No. 2 Western Kentucky	No. T–10	Roy Stewart Stadium; Murray, KY (rivalry)	W 49–0	15,800	
*Non-conference game; Rankings from AP Poll released prior to the game
