= 1980 Middle Tennessee Blue Raiders football team =

American college football season

1980 Middle Tennessee Blue Raiders football
- Conference: Ohio Valley Conference
- Record: 2–8 (2–5 OVC)
- Head coach: Boots Donnelly (2nd season)
- Home stadium: Johnny "Red" Floyd Stadium

1980 Ohio Valley Conference football standings
	Conf.					Overall
Team	W		L		T	W		L		T
No. 5 Western Kentucky $	6	–	1	–	0	9	–	1	–	0
No. T–10 Murray State	5	–	2	–	0	9	–	2	–	0
No. T–3 Eastern Kentucky ^	5	–	2	–	0	10	–	3	–	0
Austin Peay	5	–	2	–	0	7	–	4	–	0
Akron	2	–	4	–	1	3	–	7	–	1
Morehead State	2	–	5	–	0	4	–	7	–	0
Middle Tennessee	2	–	5	–	0	2	–	8	–	0
Tennessee Tech	1	–	6	–	0	4	–	7	–	0
$ – Conference champion; ^ – NCAA Division I-AA playoff participant; Rankings from Associated Press poll

The 1980 Middle Tennessee Blue Raiders football team represented Middle Tennessee State University in the 1980 NCAA Division I-AA football season

== Schedule ==
Date	Opponent	Site	Result	Attendance	Source
September 6	at North Alabama*	Braly Municipal Stadium; Florence, AL	L 0–36		
September 13	Chattanooga*	Johnny "Red" Floyd Stadium; Murfreesboro, TN	L 7–32	10,000	
September 27	Morehead State	Johnny "Red" Floyd Stadium; Murfreesboro, TN	L 10–17		
October 4	Western Carolina*	Johnny "Red" Floyd Stadium; Murfreesboro, TN	L 10–24	3,000	
October 11	at No. 8 Eastern Kentucky	Hanger Field; Richmond, KY	L 0–24	8,800	
October 18	at No. T–1 Murray State	Roy Stewart Stadium; Murray, KY	L 6–38	16,300	
October 25	Austin Peay^{†}	Johnny "Red" Floyd Stadium; Murfreesboro, TN	L 3–7		
November 8	at No. 3 Western Kentucky	L. T. Smith Stadium; Bowling Green, KY (rivalry)	L 15–30	20,100	
November 15	Akron	Johnny "Red" Floyd Stadium; Murfreesboro, TN	W 13–9		
November 22	at Tennessee Tech	Tucker Stadium; Cookeville, TN	W 21–7		
*Non-conference game; ^{†}Homecoming; Rankings from Associated Press Poll released prior to the game
