= 1980 Idaho State Bengals football team =

American college football season

1980 Idaho State Bengals football
- Conference: Big Sky Conference
- Record: 6–5 (4–4 Big Sky)
- Head coach: Dave Kragthorpe (1st season)
- Offensive coordinator: Jim Koetter (1st season)
- Offensive scheme: West Coast
- Defensive coordinator: Dick Kaiser (1st season)
- Base defense: 4–3
- Home stadium: ASISU Minidome

1980 Big Sky Conference football standings
| | Conf. | | | | | Overall |
| Team | W | | L | | T | W | | L | | T |
|---|---|---|---|---|---|---|---|---|---|---|
| No. 7 Boise State $^ | 6 | – | 1 | – | 0 | 10 | – | 3 | – | 0 |
| Idaho | 4 | – | 3 | – | 0 | 6 | – | 5 | – | 0 |
| Nevada | 4 | – | 3 | – | 0 | 6 | – | 4 | – | 1 |
| Idaho State* | 4 | – | 4 | – | 0 | 6 | – | 5 | – | 0 |
| Weber State* | 4 | – | 4 | – | 0 | 4 | – | 7 | – | 0 |
| Montana State | 3 | – | 4 | – | 0 | 4 | – | 6 | – | 0 |
| Northern Arizona | 3 | – | 4 | – | 0 | 5 | – | 6 | – | 0 |
| Montana | 1 | – | 6 | – | 0 | 3 | – | 7 | – | 0 |
$ – Conference champion; ^ – NCAA Division I-AA playoff participant; * – Idaho State and Weber State met twice in league play with each game counting as a half game.; Rankings from NCAA Division I-AA AP Poll

The 1980 Idaho State Bengals football team represented the Idaho State University as a member of the Big Sky Conference during the 1980 NCAA Division I-AA football season. Led by first-year head coach Dave Kragthorpe, the Bengals compiled an overall record of 6–5 with a mark of 4–4 in conference play, placing fourth in the Big Sky. Home games were played at the ASISU Minidome (now Holt Arena), an indoor venue on campus in Pocatello, Idaho.

Before their first win in late September, Idaho State had lost 18 consecutive games, the longest losing streak in NCAA Division I-AA. The homecoming victory over Montana in mid-October was the Bengals' first conference win in nearly three years.

Previously the offensive line and assistant head coach at Brigham Young University, Kragthorpe was hired in late November 1979, following the resignation of Bud Hake after a winless season.

== Schedule ==
| Date | Opponent | Site | Result | Attendance | Source |
|---|---|---|---|---|---|
| September 13 | at Utah State* | Romney Stadium; Logan, UT | L 7–14 | 16,187 | |
| September 20 | at Weber State | Wildcat Stadium; Ogden, UT | L 17–21 | 11,031 | |
| September 27 | No. T–10 Portland State* | ASISU Minidome; Pocatello, ID | W 59–33 | 8,042 | |
| October 4 | at Northern Arizona | Walkup Skydome; Flagstaff, AZ | L 13–38 | 15,555 | |
| October 11 | at Montana State | Reno H. Sales Stadium; Bozeman, MT | L 7–21 | 9,521 | |
| October 18 | Montana^{†} | ASISU Minidome; Pocatello, ID | W 17–0 | 9,782 | |
| October 25 | Western Montana* | ASISU Minidome; Pocatello, ID | W 41–0 | | |
| November 1 | at No. T–10 Nevada | Mackay Stadium; Reno, NV | W 33–26 | 8,142 | |
| November 8 | at Idaho | Kibbie Dome; Moscow, ID | W 28–21 | 12,000 | |
| November 15 | Weber State | ASISU Minidome; Pocatello, ID | W 46–5 | | |
| November 22 | No. 9 Boise State | ASISU Minidome; Pocatello, ID | L 13–22 | 13,865 | |
*Non-conference game; ^{†}Homecoming; Rankings from Associated Press Poll released prior to the game

== Roster ==
1980 Idaho State Bengals football team roster
Players
Coaches
Offense

| Pos. | # | Name | Class |
|---|---|---|---|
| OT | | Steve Anderson | Jr |
| FB | | Cliff Baxter | So |
| WR | | Jerry Bird | Jr |
| TE | | Rod Childs | Jr |
| WR | | Craig Corp | Jr |
| WR | | Charles Ewing | Jr |
| HB | | Lamar Fite |
| G | | Dave Kinnunen | Sr |
| QB | 12 | Dirk Koetter | Jr |
| QB | 19 | Mike Machurek | Jr |
| G | | Ken Noel | Jr |
| C | | George Ripley | Sr |
| TB | | Dwain Wilson | Jr |
| OT | | Dan Taylor | So |

Defense

| Pos. | # | Name | Class |
|---|---|---|---|
| DB | | Reggie Chapman |
| LB | | Gregg Feitner | Sr |
| FS | | Aaron Graham | Sr |
| CB | | William Harrison | Sr |
| DT | | Jack Lewis | Sr |
| LB | | Marvin Lewis | Sr |
| SS | | Bob Matsey | Sr |
| DT | | John Naut | Jr |
| CB | | Steve Scott | So |
| NG | | George Semons | Jr |
| LB | | Dave Walser | Jr |
| LB | | Ed White | Sr |

Special teams

| Pos. | # | Name | Class |
|---|---|---|---|
| PK, P | 3 | Case deBruijn | Jr |
| KR | | William Harrison | Sr |

Head coach

- Dave Kragthorpe (1st year)

Coordinators/assistant coaches

Legend

- (C) Team captain
- (S) Suspended
- (I) Ineligible
- Injured
- Redshirt
