= 1980 Boise State Broncos football team =

American college football season

1980 Boise State Broncos football
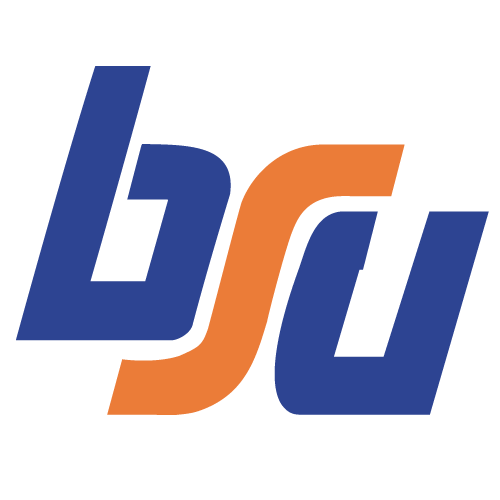

NCAA Division I-AA national champion Big Sky champion

NCAA Division I-AA Championship Game, W 31–29 vs. Eastern Kentucky
- Conference: Big Sky Conference

Ranking
- AP: No. 7 (November 26)
- Record: 10–3 (6–1 Big Sky)
- Head coach: Jim Criner (5th season)
- Offensive coordinator: Gene Dahlquist (4th season)
- Defensive coordinator: Lyle Setencich (1st season)
- Base defense: 3–4
- Home stadium: Bronco Stadium

1980 Big Sky Conference football standings
	Conf.					Overall
Team	W		L		T	W		L		T
No. 7 Boise State $^	6	–	1	–	0	10	–	3	–	0
Idaho	4	–	3	–	0	6	–	5	–	0
Nevada	4	–	3	–	0	6	–	4	–	1
Idaho State*	4	–	4	–	0	6	–	5	–	0
Weber State*	4	–	4	–	0	4	–	7	–	0
Montana State	3	–	4	–	0	4	–	6	–	0
Northern Arizona	3	–	4	–	0	5	–	6	–	0
Montana	1	–	6	–	0	3	–	7	–	0
$ – Conference champion; ^ – NCAA Division I-AA playoff participant; * – Idaho State and Weber State met twice in league play with each game counting as a half game.; Rankings from NCAA Division I-AA AP Poll

The 1980 Boise State Broncos football team represented Boise State University in the 1980 NCAA Division I-AA football season. The Broncos competed in the Big Sky Conference and played their home games at Bronco Stadium in Boise, Idaho. They were led by fifth-year head coach Jim Criner and the "Four Horseman" senior backfield: quarterback Joe Aliotti, fullback David Hughes, halfback Cedric Minter, with halfback Terry Zahner in reserve.

The previous season, the Broncos had a 10–1 record and were undefeated in the Big Sky, but were on probation for a scouting violation in November 1978, making them ineligible for the conference title or the 1979 I-AA playoffs.

== Regular season ==
The Broncos finished the regular season in 1980 at 8–3 and 6–1 in conference to win their fifth Big Sky title in eleven seasons, their first since 1977. BSU defeated their two Division I-A opponents, but lost a road contest in November to Cal Poly-SLO, the eventual Division II national champions, whom they had routed at the end of the previous season.

The Broncos easily defeated rival Idaho, then ranked ninth, for the fourth consecutive year in mid-October in Boise. During halftime of the Nevada-Reno game on November 8, BSU dedicated the playing field at Bronco Stadium to athletic director and former head coach Lyle Smith. The only conference setback was a one-point loss in late September at Montana State, the difference was a last-minute two-point conversion.

== Division I-AA playoffs ==
The Broncos were invited to the four-team I-AA playoffs. As Big Sky champions with a substantial stadium and fan base, BSU was chosen to host in the first round, a national semifinal on December 13, three weeks after the completion of the regular season. The opponent was Grambling State, coached by legend Eddie Robinson. The Broncos won 14–9 in sub-freezing fog and advanced to the championship game the following week in California against defending champion Eastern Kentucky, coached by Roy Kidd. In a back-and-forth contest played in the fog at Hughes Stadium in Sacramento, Boise State won 31–29 to win their only I-AA national title.

The Broncos returned to the I-AA semifinals the following season and 1990, and the title game in 1994; they moved up to Division I-A in 1996.

== Schedule ==
Date	Time	Opponent	Rank	Site	TV	Result	Attendance	Source
September 6	7:30 pm	at Utah*		Rice Stadium; Salt Lake City, UT		W 28–7	27,231	
September 13	7:30 pm	Southeastern Louisiana*		Bronco Stadium; Boise, ID		L 13–17	21,342	
September 20	8:00 pm	at Northern Arizona		Walkup Skydome; Flagstaff, AZ		W 20–18	10,787	
September 27	1:30 pm	at Montana State	No. 10	Reno H. Sales Stadium; Bozeman, MT		L 17–18	9,121	
October 4	7:30 pm	Montana		Bronco Stadium; Boise, ID		W 44–10	20,453	
October 11	7:30 pm	No. 9 Idaho		Bronco Stadium; Boise, ID (rivalry)		W 44–21	21,812	
October 18	7:30 pm	Cal State Fullerton*	No. 9	Bronco Stadium; Boise, ID		W 26–11	17,052	
October 25	7:30 pm	Weber State	No. 7	Bronco Stadium; Boise, ID		W 24–0	18,455	
November 8	1:30 pm	Nevada^{†}	No. 7	Bronco Stadium; Boise, ID (rivalry)		W 14–3	20,682	
November 15	8:30 pm	at No. 4 (D-II) Cal Poly*	No. 5	Mustang Stadium; San Luis Obispo, CA		L 20–23	8,330	
November 22	7:30 pm	at Idaho State	No. 9	ASISU Minidome; Pocatello, ID		W 22–13	13,865	
December 13	11:30 am	No. 2 Grambling State*	No. 7	Bronco Stadium; Boise, ID (Div. I-AA Semifinal)		W 14–9	17,300	
December 20	12:30 pm	vs. No. 3 Eastern Kentucky*	No. 7	Hughes Stadium; Sacramento, CA (Div. I-AA Championship Game — Camellia Bowl)	ABC	W 31–29	8,157	
*Non-conference game; ^{†}Homecoming; Rankings from AP Poll released prior to the game; All times are in Mountain time

== Roster ==
1980 Boise State Broncos football team roster
Players
Coaches
Offense

Pos.	#	Name	Class
FL	1	Ron Harvey	So
QB	7	Kevin McDonald	Sr
FL	11	Lance LaShelle	Sr
QB	14	Joe Aliotti	Sr
QB	18	Tim Klena	Fr
TB	20	Cedric Minter	Sr
TB	27	Terry Zahner	Sr
FB	33	David Hughes	Sr
OL	54	Art Valero	Sr
C	55	Randy Schrader	Sr
LT	60	Dennis Brady	Jr
RG	62	John Gasser	Jr
RT	67	Bill Madinger	Jr
LG	69	Shawn Beaton	Sr
SE	80	Kipp Bedard	Jr
TE	90	Duane Dlouhy	Jr

Defense

Pos.	#	Name	Class
LCB	28	Chris Bell	Jr
SS	29	Rick Woods	Jr
RCB	30	Mike Bradeson	Sr
FS	42	Larry Alder	So
NG	43	Bob Skinner	So
ROLB	48	Ron Chatterton	Sr
ROLB	52	Larry Lewis	Sr
LOLB	57	Ralph Esposito	Sr
RILB	58	Dan Williams	Sr
LILB	59	Dan Brown	Sr
LILB	61	Ray Santucci	Jr
LDT	70	Randy Trautman	Jr
RDT	83	Michel Bourgeau	Fr

Special teams

Pos.	#	Name	Class
K	10	Kenrick Camerud	So
P, K	18	Tim Klena	Fr
KR	20	Cedric Minter	Sr
KR	27	Terry Zahner	Sr
PR	29	Rick Woods	Jr
P	33	Tom Spadafore	Sr

Head coach

- Jim Criner (5th year)

Coordinators/assistant coaches

- Gene Dahlquist (OC)
- Lyle Setencich (DC)
- Dave Wasick (DL)
- Claude Tomasini (LB)
- John Fox (DB)
- Mitch Britzman
- Mike Solari
- Jeff Skocko
- Jim Farmer
- Ed Lambert
- Randy Stewart
- Bob Markovich
- John Williams (manager)
- Ed Pflefer (assistant trainer)
- Kevin Roberts (assistant trainer)
- Jim Neal (assistant trainer)
- Ted Choules (assistant trainer)
- T.J. Byrne (assistant trainer)

Legend

- (C) Team captain
- (S) Suspended
- (I) Ineligible
- Injured
- Redshirt

== NFL draft ==
One Bronco senior was selected in the 1981 NFL draft, which lasted 12 rounds (332 selections).

Player	Position	Round	Overall	Franchise
David Hughes	FB	2nd	31	Seattle Seahawks
