= 1980 Nevada Wolf Pack football team =

American college football season

1980 Nevada Wolf Pack football
- Conference: Big Sky Conference
- Record: 6–4–1 (4–3 Big Sky)
- Head coach: Chris Ault (5th season)
- Defensive coordinator: John L. Smith (4th season)
- Home stadium: Mackay Stadium

1980 Big Sky Conference football standings
	Conf.					Overall
Team	W		L		T	W		L		T
No. 7 Boise State $^	6	–	1	–	0	10	–	3	–	0
Idaho	4	–	3	–	0	6	–	5	–	0
Nevada	4	–	3	–	0	6	–	4	–	1
Idaho State*	4	–	4	–	0	6	–	5	–	0
Weber State*	4	–	4	–	0	4	–	7	–	0
Montana State	3	–	4	–	0	4	–	6	–	0
Northern Arizona	3	–	4	–	0	5	–	6	–	0
Montana	1	–	6	–	0	3	–	7	–	0
$ – Conference champion; ^ – NCAA Division I-AA playoff participant; * – Idaho State and Weber State met twice in league play with each game counting as a half game.; Rankings from NCAA Division I-AA AP Poll

The 1980 Nevada Wolf Pack football team represented the University of Nevada, Reno as a member of the Big Sky Conference during the 1980 NCAA Division I-AA football season. Led by fifth-year head coach Chris Ault, the Wolf Pack compiled an overall record of 6–4–1 with a mark of 4–3 in conference play, tying for second place in the Big Sky. The team played home games at Mackay Stadium in Reno, Nevada.

== Schedule ==
Date	Opponent	Rank	Site	Result	Attendance	Source
September 6	Southern*		Mackay Stadium; Reno, NV	W 20–0	11,552	
September 13	UC Davis*		Mackay Stadium; Reno, NV	T 13–13	9,897	
September 20	at Montana State		Reno H. Sales Stadium; Bozeman, MT	W 24–12	8,121	
September 27	at Weber State	No. 6	Wildcat Stadium; Ogden, UT	L 0–10	12,366	
October 11	Northern Arizona		Mackay Stadium; Reno, NV	W 21–0	8,790	
October 18	Cal State Northridge*^{†}		Mackay Stadium; Reno, NV	W 31–3	8,576	
October 25	Cal State Fullerton*	No. T–10	Mackay Stadium; Reno, NV	L 16–17	10,177	
November 1	Idaho State	No. T–10	Mackay Stadium; Reno, NV	L 26–30	8,142	
November 8	at No. 7 Boise State		Bronco Stadium; Boise, ID (rivalry)	L 3–14	20,682	
November 15	Montana		Mackay Stadium; Reno, NV	W 10–7	7,311	
November 22	Idaho		Mackay Stadium; Reno, NV	W 38–7	9,091	
*Non-conference game; ^{†}Homecoming; Rankings from Associated Press Poll released prior to the game

== Roster ==
1980 Nevada Wolf Pack football team roster
Players
Coaches
Offense

Pos.	#	Name	Class
RB	27	Frank Hawkins	Sr
OL	78	Eric Sanders	Sr

Defense

Pos.	#	Name	Class
DE	83	Charles Mann	So

Special teams

Pos.	#	Name	Class

Head coach

- Chris Ault

Coordinators/assistant coaches

Legend

- (C) Team captain
- (S) Suspended
- (I) Ineligible
- Injured
- Redshirt
