= 1980 Morehead State Eagles football team =

American college football season

1980 Morehead State Eagles football
- Conference: Ohio Valley Conference
- Record: 4–7 (2–5 OVC)
- Head coach: Tom Lichtenberg (2nd season)
- Home stadium: Jayne Stadium

1980 Ohio Valley Conference football standings
	Conf.					Overall
Team	W		L		T	W		L		T
No. 5 Western Kentucky $	6	–	1	–	0	9	–	1	–	0
No. T–10 Murray State	5	–	2	–	0	9	–	2	–	0
No. T–3 Eastern Kentucky ^	5	–	2	–	0	10	–	3	–	0
Austin Peay	5	–	2	–	0	7	–	4	–	0
Akron	2	–	4	–	1	3	–	7	–	1
Morehead State	2	–	5	–	0	4	–	7	–	0
Middle Tennessee	2	–	5	–	0	2	–	8	–	0
Tennessee Tech	1	–	6	–	0	4	–	7	–	0
$ – Conference champion; ^ – NCAA Division I-AA playoff participant; Rankings from Associated Press poll

The 1980 Morehead State Eagles football team represented Morehead State University as a member of the Ohio Valley Conference (OVC) during the 1980 NCAA Division I-AA football season. Led by second-year head coach Tom Lichtenberg, the Eagles compiled an overall record of 4–7, with a mark of 2–5 in conference play, and finished tied for sixth in the OVC.

== Schedule ==
Date	Opponent	Site	Result	Attendance	Source
September 6	Marshall*	Jayne Stadium; Morehead, KY	L 8–35	10,000	
September 13	James Madison*	Jayne Stadium; Morehead, KY	W 21–18		
September 27	at Middle Tennessee	Johnny "Red" Floyd Stadium; Murfreesboro, TN	W 17–10		
October 4	Murray State	Jayne Stadium; Morehead, KY	L 6–30	5,000	
October 11	Austin Peay	Morehead, KY	L 21–23	3,200	
October 18	at Youngstown State*	Rayen Stadium; Youngstown, OH	W 20–14	6,355	
October 25	Tennessee Tech	Jayne Stadium; Morehead, KY	L 29–31		
November 1	No. 4 Western Kentucky	Jayne Stadium; Morehead, KY	L 7–17	6,000	
November 8	at Liberty Baptist*	City Stadium; Lynchburg, VA	L 20–23	7,126	
November 15	Kentucky State*	Jayne Stadium; Morehead, KY	W 15–10		
November 22	at No. 4 Eastern Kentucky	Hanger Field; Richmond, KY (rivalry)	L 14–18	11,800	
*Non-conference game; Rankings from Associated Press Poll released prior to the game
