= 1980 Western Kentucky Hilltoppers football team =

American college football season

1980 Western Kentucky Hilltoppers football

OVC champion
- Conference: Ohio Valley Conference

Ranking
- AP: No. 5
- Record: 9–1 (6–1 OVC)
- Head coach: Jimmy Feix (13th season)
- Captains: Bryan Gray; Ricky Gwinn; Pete Walters
- Home stadium: Houchens Industries–L. T. Smith Stadium

1980 Ohio Valley Conference football standings
	Conf.					Overall
Team	W		L		T	W		L		T
No. 5 Western Kentucky $	6	–	1	–	0	9	–	1	–	0
No. T–10 Murray State	5	–	2	–	0	9	–	2	–	0
No. T–3 Eastern Kentucky ^	5	–	2	–	0	10	–	3	–	0
Austin Peay	5	–	2	–	0	7	–	4	–	0
Akron	2	–	4	–	1	3	–	7	–	1
Morehead State	2	–	5	–	0	4	–	7	–	0
Middle Tennessee	2	–	5	–	0	2	–	8	–	0
Tennessee Tech	1	–	6	–	0	4	–	7	–	0
$ – Conference champion; ^ – NCAA Division I-AA playoff participant; Rankings from Associated Press poll

The 1980 Western Kentucky Hilltoppers football team represented Western Kentucky University as a member of the Ohio Valley Conference (OVC) during the 1980 NCAA Division I-AA football season. Led by 14th-year head coach Jimmy Feix, the Hilltoppers compiled and overall record of 9–1 with a mark of 6–1 in conference play, winning the OVC title. However, Western Kentucky was not selected for the NCAA Division I_AA Football Championship playoffs. Instead, the OVC's second-place finisher, Eastern Kentucky, was invited despite the fact that Western had beaten them earlier in the season. This perceived snub was a factor in Western Kentucky's decision to leave the OVC in 1982. The Hilltoppers finished the season ranked fifth in final Associated Press poll.

The team's captains were Bryan Gray, Ricky Gwinn, and Pete Walters. Western Kentucky's roster included future National Football League (NFL) players Pete Walters, Davlin Mullen, John Newby, Phil Rich, Troy Snardon, Brad Todd, Donnie Evans, Ray Farmer, Ronnie Fishback, Tom Fox, Paul Gray, Ricky Gwinn, Ron Hunter, Lamont Meacham, and Mike Miller. Walters and Tim Ford were named to All-American teams and Feix was named OVC Coach of the Year for the third time. The All-Conference Team included Barry Bumm, Evans, Farmer, Jerry Flippin, Gwinn, Lamont Meacham, Rich, Snardon, and Walters.

== Schedule ==
Date	Opponent	Rank	Site	Result	Attendance	Source
September 6	Evansville*		L. T. Smith Stadium; Bowling Green, KY	W 40–18	13,000	
September 13	at Kentucky State*		Alumni Field; Frankfort, KY	W 30–8	5,393	
September 20	at Akron		Rubber Bowl; Akron, OH	W 8–2	23,506	
September 27	Austin Peay	No. 8	L. T. Smith Stadium; Bowling Green, KY	W 20–14	15,500	
October 11	Youngstown State*	No. 5	L. T. Smith Stadium; Bowling Green, KY	W 42–17	12,500	
October 18	at Tennessee Tech	No. 4	Tucker Stadium; Cookeville, TN	W 28–17	11,600	
October 25	No. 5 Eastern Kentucky	No. 4	L. T. Smith Stadium; Bowling Green, KY (rivalry)	W 13–10	19,700	
November 1	Morehead State	No. 4	Jayne Stadium; Morehead, KY	W 17–7	6,000	
November 8	Middle Tennessee^{†}	No. 3	L. T. Smith Stadium; Bowling Green, KY (rivalry)	W 30–15	20,100	
November 22	at No. 10 Murray State	No. 2	Roy Stewart Stadium; Murray, KY (rivalry)	L 0–49	15,800	
*Non-conference game; ^{†}Homecoming; Rankings from Associated Press Poll released prior to the game
