= 1980 Austin Peay Governors football team =

American college football season

1980 Austin Peay Governors football
- Conference: Ohio Valley Conference
- Record: 7–4 (5–2 OVC)
- Head coach: Watson Brown (2nd season)
- Home stadium: Municipal Stadium

1980 Ohio Valley Conference football standings
	Conf.					Overall
Team	W		L		T	W		L		T
No. 5 Western Kentucky $	6	–	1	–	0	9	–	1	–	0
No. T–10 Murray State	5	–	2	–	0	9	–	2	–	0
No. T–3 Eastern Kentucky ^	5	–	2	–	0	10	–	3	–	0
Austin Peay	5	–	2	–	0	7	–	4	–	0
Akron	2	–	4	–	1	3	–	7	–	1
Morehead State	2	–	5	–	0	4	–	7	–	0
Middle Tennessee	2	–	5	–	0	2	–	8	–	0
Tennessee Tech	1	–	6	–	0	4	–	7	–	0
$ – Conference champion; ^ – NCAA Division I-AA playoff participant; Rankings from Associated Press poll

The 1980 Austin Peay Governors football team represented Austin Peay State University as a member of the Ohio Valley Conference (OVC) during the 1980 NCAA Division I-AA football season. Led by second-year head coach Watson Brown, the Governors compiled an overall record of 7–4, with a mark of 5–2 in conference play, and finished tied for second in the OVC.

== Schedule ==
Date	Opponent	Site	Result	Attendance	Source
September 13	at Tennessee–Martin*	Pacer Stadium; Martin, TN	L 20–24	8,200	
September 20	James Madison*	Municipal Stadium; Clarksville, TN	W 21–3		
September 27	at No. 8 Western Kentucky	L. T. Smith Stadium; Bowling Green, KY	L 14–20	15,500	
October 4	Eastern Kentucky	Municipal Stadium; Clarksville, TN	L 10–23	4,000	
October 11	at Morehead State	Morehead, KY	W 23–21	3,200	
October 18	Nicholls State*	Municipal Stadium; Clarksville, TN	W 35–16		
October 25	at Middle Tennessee	Johnny "Red" Floyd Stadium; Murfreesboro, TN	W 7–3		
November 1	at Akron	Rubber Bowl; Akron, OH	W 41–14	8,000	
November 8	No. 8 Murray State	Municipal Stadium; Clarksville, TN	W 24–0		
November 15	Tennessee Tech	Municipal Stadium; Clarksville, TN	W 13–10		
November 22	at Arkansas State*	Indian Stadium; Jonesboro, AR	L 9–14		
*Non-conference game; Rankings from Associated Press Poll released prior to the game
