= 1980 Akron Zips football team =

American college football season

1980 Akron Zips football
- Conference: Ohio Valley Conference
- Record: 3–7–1 (2–4–1 OVC)
- Head coach: Jim Dennison (8th season)
- Captain: Andy Graham; Ricky Holman; Jim Tawse
- Home stadium: Rubber Bowl

1980 Ohio Valley Conference football standings
	Conf.					Overall
Team	W		L		T	W		L		T
No. 5 Western Kentucky $	6	–	1	–	0	9	–	1	–	0
No. T–10 Murray State	5	–	2	–	0	9	–	2	–	0
No. T–3 Eastern Kentucky ^	5	–	2	–	0	10	–	3	–	0
Austin Peay	5	–	2	–	0	7	–	4	–	0
Akron	2	–	4	–	1	3	–	7	–	1
Morehead State	2	–	5	–	0	4	–	7	–	0
Middle Tennessee	2	–	5	–	0	2	–	8	–	0
Tennessee Tech	1	–	6	–	0	4	–	7	–	0
$ – Conference champion; ^ – NCAA Division I-AA playoff participant; Rankings from Associated Press poll

The 1980 Akron Zips football team represented Akron University in the 1980 NCAA Division I-AA football season as a member of the Ohio Valley Conference. Led by eighth-year head coach Jim Dennison, the Zips played their home games at the Rubber Bowl in Akron, Ohio. They finished the season with a record of 3–7–1 overall and 2–4–1 in OVC play, placing fifth.

== Schedule ==
Date	Opponent	Site	Result	Attendance	Source
September 6	Northeast Missouri State*	Rubber Bowl; Akron, OH	W 31–7	36,041	
September 13	Eastern Kentucky	Rubber Bowl; Akron, OH	W 21–10	10,402	
September 20	Western Kentucky	Rubber Bowl; Akron, OH	L 2–8	23,506	
September 27	at Indiana State*	Memorial Stadium; Terre Haute, IN	L 9–27	10,486	
October 4	at Youngstown State	Stambaugh Stadium; Youngstown, OH (Steel Tire)	T 0–0		
October 11	Eastern Michigan*	Rubber Bowl; Akron, OH	W 21–10		
October 18	at Temple*	Veterans Stadium; Philadelphia, PA	L 7–16	2,872	
October 25	at No. 1 Murray State	Roy Stewart Stadium; Murray, KY	L 10–13	8,500	
November 1	Austin Peay	Rubber Bowl; Akron, OH	L 14–41	8,000	
November 8	at Northern Michigan*	Memorial Field; Marquette, MI	L 10–38		
November 15	at Middle Tennessee	Johnny "Red" Floyd Stadium; Murfreesboro, TN	L 9–13		
*Non-conference game; Rankings from NCAA Division I-AA Football Committee Poll released prior to the game
