= 1980 Montana State Bobcats football team =

American college football season

1980 Montana State Bobcats football
- Conference: Big Sky Conference
- Record: 4–6 (3–4 Big Sky)
- Head coach: Sonny Lubick (3rd season)
- Home stadium: Reno H. Sales Stadium

1980 Big Sky Conference football standings
	Conf.					Overall
Team	W		L		T	W		L		T
No. 7 Boise State $^	6	–	1	–	0	10	–	3	–	0
Idaho	4	–	3	–	0	6	–	5	–	0
Nevada	4	–	3	–	0	6	–	4	–	1
Idaho State*	4	–	4	–	0	6	–	5	–	0
Weber State*	4	–	4	–	0	4	–	7	–	0
Montana State	3	–	4	–	0	4	–	6	–	0
Northern Arizona	3	–	4	–	0	5	–	6	–	0
Montana	1	–	6	–	0	3	–	7	–	0
$ – Conference champion; ^ – NCAA Division I-AA playoff participant; * – Idaho State and Weber State met twice in league play with each game counting as a half game.; Rankings from NCAA Division I-AA AP Poll

The 1980 Montana State Bobcats football team represented the Montana State University as a member of the Big Sky Conference during the 1980 NCAA Division I-AA football season. Led by third-year head coach Sonny Lubick, the Bobcats compiled an overall record of 4–6 and a mark of 3–4 in conference play, tying for sixth place in the Big Sky.

== Schedule ==
Date	Opponent	Site	Result	Attendance	Source
September 13	at North Dakota*	Memorial Stadium; Grand Forks, ND	L 6–14	10,000	
September 20	Nevada	Reno H. Sales Stadium; Bozeman, MT	L 12–24	8,121	
September 27	No. 10 Boise State	Reno H. Sales Stadium; Bozeman, MT	W 18–17	9,121	
October 4	at Weber State	Wildcat Stadium; Logan, UT	L 7–12	11,847	
October 11	Idaho State	Reno H. Sales Stadium; Bozeman, MT	W 21–7	9,521	
October 18	at Idaho	Kibbie Dome; Moscow, ID	L 6–14	15,000	
October 25	Northern Arizona	Reno H. Sales Stadium; Bozeman, MT	L 24–27	7,121	
November 1	at Montana	Dornblaser Field; Missoula, MT (rivalry)	W 24–7	12,700	
November 8	North Dakota State*	Reno H. Sales Stadium; Bozeman, Missoula, MT	W 21–19	5,121	
November 15	at Fresno State*	Bulldog Stadium; Fresno, CA	L 14–21	25,684	
*Non-conference game; Rankings from AP Poll released prior to the game

== Roster ==
1980 Montana State Bobcats football team roster
Players			Coaches
Offense: Pos. / # / Name / Class; C / / Larry Rubens / Jr	Defense: Pos. / # / Name / Class	Special teams: Pos. / # / Name / Class	Head coach: Sonny Lubick; Coordinators/assistant coaches Legend: (C) Team captain; (S) Suspended; (I) Ineligible; Injured; Redshirt
