= Minor League Football System =

- Sport: American football
- Founded: 1989
- Folded: 1990
- Commissioner: Roger Wehrli
- No. of teams: 11 (1989), 12 (1990)
- Country: United States
- Last champion: Charlotte Barons (1990)

The Minor League Football System (MLFS) was a semi-professional American football league that operated during the summers of 1989 and 1990. It was established with the goal of becoming a nationwide feeder system for the National Football League (NFL).

== History ==
The MLFS was created in 1989 with the intent of serving as a nationwide minor league for players seeking NFL exposure and marketed itself as having "major league ambitions" while operating on a semi-professional financial model. Players were not paid, instead, it established a Job Placement Program to help players secure employment in the cities where they played. The league plan was to play a 12-game season under NFL rules from late July through mid-October. Teams were based in multiple states throughout the country, with early press described the MLFS as a structured alternative to the scattered semi-pro circuits of the era.

On February 10, 1989 the league announced that representatives from 14 franchises completed two days of meetings in which they discussed logistics and operational plans for the league’s inaugural season. The teams were slated to be based in Birmingham, Seattle, West Palm Beach, Hayward (California), Fairfax, Portland, Wilmington, Raleigh, Colorado Springs, Omaha, Tulsa, Scranton, Lowell (Massachusetts), and Ottawa, Canada. The league planned to divide the franchises into West Coast, Midwest, and East Coast divisions. Each franchise paid a $10,000 league entry fee, along with an additional $2,000 to attend the initial organizational meetings. A month later the MLFS releases a list of only 11 franchises (only five teams - Seattle, Hayward, Fairfax, Colorado Springs and Scranton - were at the original announcement) that will play in the 1989 inaugural season.

A retrospective in The New York Times characterized the league's inaugural season as a difficult effort to establish a structured national minor league system.

The league continued in 1990 but financial struggles, uneven attendance, and travel costs destabilized the organization. Several franchises folded during the season. By the end of 1990, the MLFS ceased operations.

=== 1989 season ===
The 1989 season marked the league's debut, with teams competing in a summer schedule designed to avoid conflict with the NFL and college football seasons. The league emphasized player development but struggled financially throughout the year. Nine of the original 11 teams were semipro teams that have played in other leagues.

The Colorado Springs Spirit included a transgender cheerleader in their squad, Shannon Ireland Trump, who stated that she was a niece of former USFL's New Jersey Generals owner and future U.S. President Donald Trump.

Eastern Division
Team	W	L	T	Pct.	PF	PA
Charlotte	12	0	0	1.000	462	90
Harrisburg	6	4	0	.600	205	195
Pocono	3	7	0	.300	177	225
Virginia	3	7	0	.300	144	262
Florida	2	8	0	.200	169	335
Western Division
Team	W	L	T	Pct.	PF	PA
San Jose	7	3	0	.700	210	216
Colorado Springs	8	4	0	.667	285	225
Pueblo	6	4	0	.600	292	175
St. Louis	6	6	0	.500	299	296
Hayward	6	6	0	.500	216	246
Seattle	1	11	0	.083	194	377

==== Playoffs ====
Quarterfinals
4
5
3
6

Semifinals
E1	Charlotte	12
W3	Pueblo	20
W1	San Jose	7
W2	Colorado Springs	19

MLFS Championship
W2	Colorado Springs	14
W3	Pueblo	21

=== 1990 International Friendlies ===
During the 1990 preseason, five MLFS teams played exhibition games against the visiting Moscow Bears, the first gridiron football team formed in the Soviet Union as part of Mikhail Gorbachev's Glasnost initiative. The Bears team was coached by John Ralston, and all players were former athletes in other sports who were recruited to play football and earned 400 to 800 rubles a month (twice the average Soviet wage at the time), which was sponsored by various American corporate sponsors.

The MLFS teams won the first four matchups, with Moscow held scoreless in each contest, by a combined score of 185-0. In their last game they played against the Charlotte Barons "development squad" - a group of amateur players who were not good enough to make the Barons team, and won 2-0.

Date	Home team	Score	Road Team	Score	Attendance
02.07.1990	Tacoma Express	61	Moscow Bears	0	1,303
04.07.1990	Fresno Bandits	42	Moscow Bears	0	6,000
07.07.1990	Oklahoma City Twisters	54	Moscow Bears	0	4,500
10.07.1990	Middle Georgia Heat Wave	28	Moscow Bears	0	??
14.07.1990	Charlotte Barons (development squad)	0	Moscow Bears	2	??

=== 1990 season ===
The league returned for a second season in 1990 with a revised structure. Despite attempts to stabilize operations, multiple clubs folded mid-season and the MLFS was unable to sustain play beyond the year. The Colorado Springs Spirit opened the season with a 7–0 record before head coach Pete Riehlman resigned, citing health reasons. On the same day, the league’s leading rusher, Rick Gales, along with three-fifths of the offensive line, departed the team. With the roster reduced to 22 players, the Spirit forfeited their next game and were subsequently expelled from the MLFS. The league continued to destabilize, as the Tacoma Express folded after eight games, prompting the MLFS to cut-short the regular season after 10 weeks.

The Charlotte Barons won the 1990 MLFS championship, defeating the Pueblo Crusaders 24–18.

Eastern Division
Team	W	L	T	Pct.	PF	PA
Charlotte	8	1	0	.889	310	96
Bay State	8	2	0	.800	226	124
Middle Georgia	6	4	0	.600	176	144
Florida	4	7	0	.364	135	213
Harrisburg	2	8	0	.200	133	255
Scranton	2	9	0	.182	76	260
Western Division
Team	W	L	T	Pct.	PF	PA
Pueblo	8	1	0	.889	276	110
Colorado Springs	7	1	0	.875	180	128
Oklahoma City	7	2	0	.778	249	49
Fresno	4	6	0	.400	108	183
Tacoma	1	7	0	.125	68	149
California	0	9	0	.000	95	315

==== Playoffs ====
Semifinals
E1	Charlotte	21
E2	Bay State	20
W2	Oklahoma City	10
W1	Pueblo	21

MLFS Championship
E1	Charlotte	24
W1	Pueblo	18

== Teams ==
The MLFS featured 11 teams in 1989 and 12 teams for the 1990 season:

Team	City	Years active	Division
Charlotte Barons	Charlotte, NC	1989–1990	Eastern
Harrisburg Patriots	Harrisburg, PA	1989–1990	Eastern
Pocono Mountaineers	Pocono, PA	1989	Eastern
Virginia Storm	Halifax, VA	1989	Eastern
Florida Renegades	Palm Beach Gardens, FL	1989–1990	Eastern
San Jose Bandits	San Jose, CA	1989	Western
Fresno Bandits	Fresno, CA	1990	Western
Colorado Springs Spirit	Colorado Springs, CO	1989–1990	Western
Pueblo Crusaders	Pueblo, CO	1989–1990	Western
St. Louis Riverboat Gamblers	St. Louis, MO	1989	Western
Hayward Outlaws	Hayward, CA	1989	Western
California Outlaws	Sacramento, CA	1990	Western
Seattle Express	Seattle, WA	1989	Western
Tacoma Express	Tacoma, WA	1990	Western
Bay State Titans	Lynn, Massachusetts	1990	Eastern
Middle Georgia Heat Wave	Macon, Georgia	1990	Eastern
Scranton/Wilkes-Barre Stallions	Scranton, PA	1990	Eastern
Oklahoma City Twisters	Oklahoma City, OK	1990	Western

== Legacy ==
Though short-lived, the MLFS is remembered for its attempt to create a national, structured minor league at a time when most semi-pro football was regional and loosely organized. The league folded after the 1990 season without achieving its aim of becoming the NFL's official minor league. In 1991, the NFL launched its own development league, the World League of American Football (WLAF), which debuted with six teams in the United States, one in Canada, and three in Europe.

In addition, the MLFS was the first ever American football league to play against a Soviet Union team.
