= Pocatello Regional Transit =

Mass transportation system in southeast Idaho, USA

Pocatello Regional Transit (PRT)

- Headquarters: Pocatello, Idaho 83204
- Locale: 5815 South 5th Avenue
- Service area: Bannock County, Bingham County, Bear Lake County, Box Elder County, Caribou County, Franklin County, Power County
- Service type: Transit bus, Paratransit
- Website: pocatellotransit.com Official Website

Pocatello Regional Transit (PRT) is the primary provider of mass transportation in Southeast Idaho and is a department within the City of Pocatello. Public transit services being provided by PRT in Idaho Transportation District #5 have been greatly assisted by County and Municipal organizations, the Idaho Transportation Department (ITD), and the Federal Transit Administration (FTA).

== History ==
Privately operated rubber tired motorized Streetcar service was operated in the Pocatello area at least as early as World War I (Circa 1917), with that type of conveyance plying the streets between the city's downtown and The Academy (Now Idaho State University) and other locations. These early beginnings of public transit in Pocatello expanded to significant private public bus service in succeeding decades with the costs of capitalization and operations being met through inexpensive fares. Private automobile ownership was not what it is today and the bus services thrived. However, by the mid 1960s this situation began to change with most privately owned intra-city public bus services in the United States no longer financially sustainable. Pocatello's privately owned bus services pretty much went out of service before 1965 and there would be a period of some fifteen years before any regularly scheduled fixed-route public transit system would be seen on the streets of Pocatello.

Pocatello Regional Transit (PRT), as it is known today, originated with the South Eastern Idaho Community Action Agency's (SEICAA) creation of a targeted and limited door-to-door service for senior citizens in 1972. This one bus system, using an old surplus army vehicle, was known as Tello Bus. Throughout the 70's the service capability and area expanded to include senior bus service in Pocatello and some areas of Bannock County. Title IIIB, state senior citizen transportation funding along with Bannock County, City of Pocatello and SEICAA financial assistance represented the operational and capital foundation until 1978. This was also the year that the system was able to extend service to include persons with disabilities regardless of age.

Tello Bus became Urban Transit in 1980 (subsequently called Pocatello Urban Transit—PUT) with a loop opposed loop fixed route service for the general public added to its door-to-door services for seniors and persons with disabilities. In 1982, in an action responding to the 1980 census which made Pocatello a small urbanized area, the City of Pocatello assumed responsibility for the administration and operations of the transit system.

Also in the late 1970s and early 1980s, UMTA (Urban Mass Transportation Administration, later called FTA—Federal Transit Administration.) began to provide some funding assistance for rural public transit. This policy change greatly assisted the local transit system in making it possible to serve the broader general public needs in Pocatello and the rural areas. After 1982, when Pocatello became a small urban area, the funding assistance was separated for the small urban area and the rural areas of service. Pocatello Urban Transit (PUT) underwent a final name change in the late 1980s to the system name of Pocatello Regional Transit (PRT); reflecting its return to rural service, expanded urban fixed route service, and the inclusion of routes wholly serving the Idaho State University campus.

Even though It was always a financial challenge for PRT to survive and flourish without any dedicated state funding to assist the City and rural areas in the provision of public transit, the system continued to grow while carefully husbanding limited resources. This included the use of used vehicles for the fixed route until the first new buses were bought with Stripper Well funds match and UMTA funds in 1988. Thereafter, buses were able to be purchased including the acquisition of new 30' and 35' buses for fixed route service. Today, PRT operates nearly 30 buses throughout the service area, consisting fixed-route and demand-responsive routes. All routed buses and vehicles serving persons with disabilities have ADA accessible lift/ramp and features.

Acquiring and maintaining administrative and maintenance facilities has historically presented a challenge as well. The old Greyhound Building was used for many years as a transit downtown transfer and administrative facility as well as a (circa 1920's) garage on the East side that PRT shared with other city departments for a number of years—it is no longer considered in good condition. In a newer development, (thanks to FTA and the City of Pocatello) a project that was six years in the making came to fruition with the opening in July 2014 of new transit Administration and Maintenance facilities on South 5th.

== Fixed Routes (Pocatello) ==
PRT Fixed Route Bus

PRT offers multiple fixed route services throughout the cities of Pocatello/Chubbuck available to ALL general public. All routed buses include ADA features including accessible wheelchair lifts/ramps. These services are provided on a repetitive, fixed schedule basis along a specific route with vehicles stopping to pick up and deliver passengers to specific locations; each fixed route trip serves the same origins and destinations once an hour. Buses ONLY stop at designated stops (city ordinance). Free transfer tickets are available for passengers needing to access destinations that otherwise requires more than one bus route and must be requested at the time the fare is paid upon boarding.

== Commuter Routes ==
PRT Commuter Bus

PRT's commuter routes operate on a faster schedule by not making as many stops as normal bus services and often taking quicker routes, such as along freeways. The fare on the commuter services vary and may be higher than normal parallel services, for the quicker service. PRT operates two commuter routes consisting of the American Falls Commuter (Pocatello, ID to American Falls, ID) and the Logan Commuter (Preston to Logan, UT).

== Door-to-Door / Paratransit Services ==
PRT Paratransit Bus

PRT offers paratransit services in the Pocatello area available to senior citizens 60+ years of age and also qualifying disabled passengers that are unable to, either temporarily or permanently, utilize the other transportation services provided by PRT. All buses include ADA features including accessible wheelchair lifts/ramps. Rural door-to-door services are available to all community members and is provided through intergovernmental agreements with county and municipal governments throughout the transportation district and include the following counties:

- Bannock County
- Bingham County
- Bear Lake County
- Box Elder County
- Caribou County
- Franklin County
- Power County

== Agency Pictures ==
PRT Logo

PRT Fixed Route Bus

PRT Commuter Bus

PRT Paratransit Bus
