= ICCU Dome =

Athletic stadium at Idaho State University

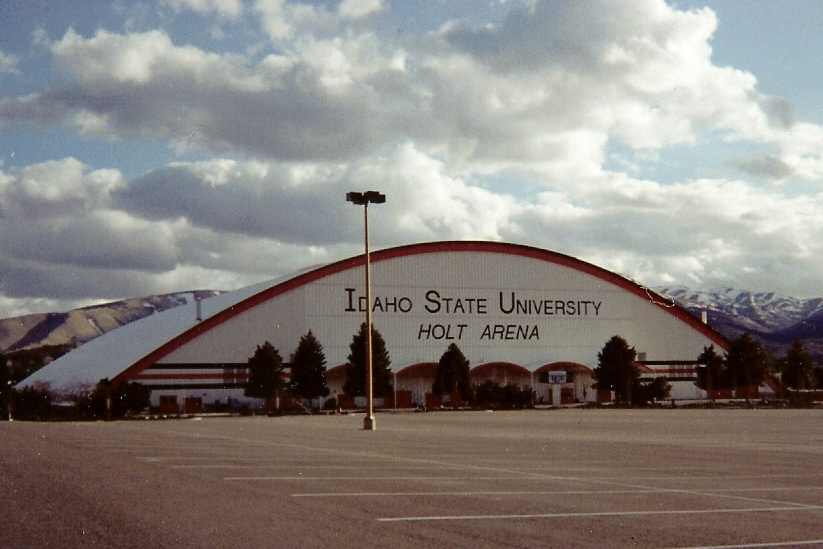
- View from northeast in 2008

- Location in the United States Location in Idaho
- Interactive map of ICCU Dome
- Former names: ASISU Minidome (1970–1988); Holt Arena (1988–2023)
- Address: 550 Memorial Drive
- Location: Idaho State University; Pocatello, Idaho, U.S.
- Coordinates: 42.870°N 112.429°W
- Elevation: 4,560 feet (1,390 m) AMSL
- Owner: Idaho State University
- Operator: Idaho State University
- Capacity: 12,000 (football); 8,000 (basketball)
- Surface: SoftTop Matrix artificial turf (2011–present); Poly-Turf, AstroTurf (1970–2010)
- Record attendance: 13,895 (football); November 22, 1980 vs. Boise State
- Public transit: Pocatello Regional Transit

Construction
- Groundbreaking: October 1, 1968
- Opened: May 9, 1970; 56 years ago (spring game)
- Renovated: 2022–2023
- Cost: $2.8 million ($23.2 million in 2025)

Tenants
- Idaho State Bengals (Big Sky, NCAA) (1970–present)

Website
- isubengals.com/facilities/holt-arena/8

The ICCU Dome is an indoor multi-purpose athletic stadium in the western United States, located on the campus of Idaho State University (ISU) in Pocatello, Idaho. It is the home field of the Idaho State Bengals of the Big Sky Conference and sits at an elevation of 4,560 feet (1,390 m) above sea level.

== History ==
Originally the ASISU Minidome, named after the Associated Students of Idaho State University, who funded construction, it opened 56 years ago in 1970 at the north end of the ISU campus. The indoor facility replaced the outdoor "Spud Bowl" (now Davis Field) as the Bengals' home football stadium. Its first event was the Bengals' spring football game on May 9, held on a rainy Saturday night.

The venue became Holt Arena in 1988 to honor Milton W. "Dubby" Holt (1914–2007), ISU's athletic director from 1967 to 1989. As assistant athletic director, Holt conceived the indoor arena in 1966 and it was designed by architect Cedric M. Allen. Although a controversial design proposal for the time, ISU students voted to appropriate not more than $2.8 million to the project two years later. The arena was built entirely with these voluntary student funds. With over 56% in favor, ISU students approved a $12 increase in semester fees to fund the stadium in early 1968.

It is the oldest enclosed stadium on a college campus in the United States and the second-oldest overall. Only the Astrodome in Houston, completed in 1965, predates it. Since the Astrodome's closure in 2006, Holt Arena has been the oldest enclosed stadium in use. The football field is aligned east-west and the arched roof runs length-wise; maximum height is above midfield and decreases toward the end zones.

The original artificial turf installed in 1970 was Poly-Turf. After 41 football seasons on Poly-Turf and AstroTurf, infilled synthetic turf was installed in Holt Arena in July 2011. Similar to FieldTurf, the SoftTop Removable Matrix System is also installed in AT&T Stadium in the NFL. Holt Arena underwent major renovations planned to be completed by the 2023 season. A new turf was designed as part of the renovations.

In 2024, it was officially renamed the ICCU Dome on January 9, following an announcement by the university, in conjunction with Idaho Central Credit Union (ICCU), and approved by the state board of education.

== Additional uses ==
The ICCU Dome also serves as home for the ISU indoor track and field team and men's basketball team. It also hosts high school football games, the famous Simplot Games high school indoor track meet, along with other sporting events, rodeos, concerts, monster truck shows, and other activities.

During ISU's run in basketball to the Elite Eight in 1977, they won the Big Sky regular season title, which allowed them to host the four-team conference tournament, which they also won. The Bengals were allowed to stay home for the first round of the 32-team NCAA tournament, as the Minidome had a pair of first round games (sub-regionals) on Saturday, March 12. UCLA defeated Louisville and hometown ISU beat Long Beach State. (Five days later, Idaho State stunned UCLA in the Sweet Sixteen at the West regional in Provo, Utah.) Between the Big Sky tourney and the NCAA games, the venue also hosted the state's three-day A-1 (now 6A) high school championship tournament.

Following the success of the Minidome, several other colleges built enclosed stadiums, including the Kibbie Dome at the University of Idaho in Moscow, which was enclosed in 1975 after four years as an outdoor stadium, and the Walkup Skydome at Northern Arizona University in Flagstaff, opened in 1977.

It is one of three indoor football stadiums currently in use in the Big Sky Conference, along with the Kibbie Dome and Walkup Skydome. During the final six seasons of Idaho's absence from Big Sky football (2012–2017), the Alerus Center at the University of North Dakota in Grand Forks was another indoor stadium used in Big Sky football, but UND left the Big Sky after the 2017 football season for the Missouri Valley Football Conference, home to three other football programs that play in domes (North Dakota State, Northern Iowa, and South Dakota).

The venue features 194,400 square feet (18,060 m^{2}) of floor space; the building is recessed twenty feet (6 m) below grade and rises 89 feet (27 m) above grade at its highest point. It hosted the 2018 convention of the Idaho Republican Party in late June.

== See also ==
- List of NCAA Division I FCS football stadiums
- List of NCAA Division I basketball arenas

| Preceded by Tacoma Dome | Host of the NCAA Division I-AA National Championship Game; 1987–1988 | Succeeded by Paulson Stadium |
