= Jim Criner =

American football player and coach (born 1940)

Biographical details
- Born: March 30, 1940 (age 86); Lurton, Arkansas, U.S.

Playing career
- 1960–1961: Cal Poly
- Positions: Linebacker, fullback

Coaching career (HC unless noted)
- 1967–1968: Utah (OL)
- 1969: Cal State Hayward (DC)
- 1970–1971: California (DB)
- 1972: BYU (assistant)
- 1973–1974: UCLA (OL)
- 1975: UCLA (LB)
- 1976–1982: Boise State
- 1983–1986: Iowa State
- 1991–1992: Sacramento Surge (OL)
- 1995–2000: Scottish Claymores
- 2001: Las Vegas Outlaws
- 2009–2010: Aix-en-Provence Argonautes
- 2012: Amiens Spartiates

Head coaching record
- Overall: 75–45–3 (college)

Accomplishments and honors

Championships
- 1 NCAA Division I-AA (1980); 2 Big Sky (1977, 1980); 1 Casque de Diamant 1st division of France (2012)

Jim Criner (born March 30, 1940) is an American former football player and coach. He was the head coach at Boise State University from 1976 to 1982 and at Iowa State University from 1983 to 1986, compiling a career record of 76–46–3 (.620) as a college football head coach. Criner was also the head coach of the NFL Europe's Scottish Claymores from 1995 to 2000, and the short-lived XFL's Las Vegas Outlaws in 2001. Criner has also been head coach in the French league Ligue Élite de Football Américain.

Criner's 1980 Boise State team won the NCAA Division I-AA Championship and his Scottish Claymores squad won World Bowl IV in 1996. He was later a scout for the Kansas City Chiefs of the National Football League (NFL) under head coach Dick Vermeil, whom he assisted at UCLA from 1974 to 1975.

== Early life and playing career ==
Born in Lurton, Arkansas, Criner was a four-sport athlete in California at Coachella Valley High School in Thermal. He attended Palo Verde Junior College, then transferred to Cal Poly in San Luis Obispo, where he played fullback.

== Coaching career ==
=== High school football and college assistant coaching ===
Criner began his career as an assistant to Jim Hanifan at Charter Oak High School (1963), and then was an assistant under head coach Leonard Cohn at Claremont High School (1964) and then was head coach at Clovis High School.

Criner became a college assistant coach in 1967 at Utah, serving two seasons as the offensive line coach. In 1969, he became the defensive coordinator at Cal State Hayward. In 1970, he became the secondary coach at California for two seasons, and in 1972 moved to BYU for a season. He was the offensive line coach in 1973 at UCLA under Pepper Rodgers and continued under Dick Vermeil in 1974; he moved to linebackers coach in 1975, when UCLA won the Pac-8 title and upset top-ranked Ohio State 23–10 in the Rose Bowl.

=== Boise State ===
Following UCLA's Rose Bowl victory over Ohio State in January 1976, Criner was hired as the head coach at Boise State, replacing Tony Knap, who had departed for UNLV. At the time, Boise State was a strong Division II program in the Big Sky Conference, and had won three consecutive conference titles. Criner's first contract at BSU was for one year at $24,200. The Broncos won the conference title again in his second season in 1977, and the conference moved up to the newly formed Division I-AA in 1978. Boise State went undefeated in conference in 1979, but were ineligible for the Big Sky title or the I-AA playoffs; they had been placed on probation for improper scouting late in the 1978 season.

Off of probation in 1980, Boise State won the Big Sky title with a 6–1 conference record, and advanced to the four-team I-AA playoffs, and defeated Grambling 14–9 in the first round (semifinals) in a 22 °F (−6 °C) fog in Boise. The following week they traveled to Sacramento and defeated defending champion Eastern Kentucky 31–29 for the Division I-AA Championship.

Boise State again went 6–1 in conference in 1981, and tied for first with Idaho State in the Big Sky; both co-champions were invited to the expanded eight-team I-AA playoffs. The Broncos defeated Jackson State on the road, but were defeated at home in the semifinals by Eastern Kentucky. Idaho State won the 1981 national title, defeating EKU the following week in Texas. In Criner's seven seasons at Boise State, the Broncos were 34–12 (.739) in conference, and 59–21–1 (.735) overall.

=== Iowa State ===
Following the 1982 season at BSU, Criner became the 27th head coach at Iowa State University of the Big Eight Conference. He had a five-year contract for $58,000 annually, but lasted only four seasons in Ames. He was fired from this position in November 1986, when the school announced the organization had made 34 allegations of wrongdoing in the football program. Allegations included coaches giving players cash as well as giving recruits rides and meals. His record with the Cyclones was 16–24–2 (.405) overall and 8–16–2 (.346) in conference play.

=== Aix-en-Provence Argonautes, France ===
Reached 2009 semi-final of French top level Ligue Élite de Football Américain league playoffs.

=== Amiens Spartiates (Spartans), France ===
2012 Ligue Élite de Football Américain league Champion with the Amiens Spartans, France

== Personal life ==
Criner has three brothers and two sisters; all three of his brothers had prominent sports careers. His son, Mark, was his defensive coordinator in the XFL for the Las Vegas Outlaws and went on to coach at Cincinnati, Minnesota, and Middle Tennessee State among others. Grandson Calin Criner (born 1997) is a defensive graduate assistant at Boise State University

== Head coaching record ==
=== College ===
Year	Team	Overall	Conference	Standing	Bowl/playoffs	AP^{#}
Boise State Broncos (Big Sky Conference) (1976–1982)
1976	Boise State	5–5–1	2–4	5th		
1977	Boise State	9–2	6–0	1st	(Note: Boise State concluded its regular season after the NCAA Division II playoffs started; runner-up Northern Arizona was awarded playoff bid.)	T–5
1978	Boise State	7–4	3–3	4th		
1979	Boise State	10–1	7–0	(Note: The Broncos were on probation for a scouting violation in November 1978; they were ineligible for the league title, AP poll, or I-AA playoffs in 1979 and were not allowed to scouting films of upcoming opponents.)		
1980	Boise State	10–3	6–1	1st	W NCAA Division I-AA Championship	7
1981	Boise State	10–3	6–1	2nd	L NCAA Division I-AA Semifinal	5
1982	Boise State	8–3	4–3	4th		15
Boise State:		59–21–1	34–12			
Iowa State Cyclones (Big Eight Conference) (1983–1986)
1983	Iowa State	4–7	3–4	T–4th		
1984	Iowa State	2–7–2	0–5–2	T–7th		
1985	Iowa State	5–6	3–4	5th		
1986	Iowa State	5–4 (Note: Criner was fired after the first nine games of the 1986 season and replaced by Chuck Banker as interim head coach. Iowa State finished the year 6–5 overall and 3–4 in conference play, placing fifth in the Big 8.)	2–3			
Iowa State:		16–25–2	8–16–2			
Total:		75–45–3				
National championship Conference title Conference division title or championship game berth

=== XFL ===
Team	Year	Regular season					Postseason			
Team	Year	Won	Lost	Ties	Win %	Finish	Won	Lost	Win %	Result
LV	2001	4	6	0	.400	4th in Western Division	did not qualify			
Total		4	6	0	.400		0	0	.000	
