= 1980 Eastern Kentucky Colonels football team =

American college football season

1980 Eastern Kentucky Colonels football

NCAA Division I-AA Championship Game, L 29–31 vs. Boise State
- Conference: Ohio Valley Conference
- Record: 10–3 (5–2 OVC)
- Head coach: Roy Kidd (17th season)
- Home stadium: Hanger Field

1980 Ohio Valley Conference football standings
	Conf.					Overall
Team	W		L		T	W		L		T
No. 5 Western Kentucky $	6	–	1	–	0	9	–	1	–	0
No. T–10 Murray State	5	–	2	–	0	9	–	2	–	0
No. T–3 Eastern Kentucky ^	5	–	2	–	0	10	–	3	–	0
Austin Peay	5	–	2	–	0	7	–	4	–	0
Akron	2	–	4	–	1	3	–	7	–	1
Morehead State	2	–	5	–	0	4	–	7	–	0
Middle Tennessee	2	–	5	–	0	2	–	8	–	0
Tennessee Tech	1	–	6	–	0	4	–	7	–	0
$ – Conference champion; ^ – NCAA Division I-AA playoff participant; Rankings from Associated Press poll

The 1980 Eastern Kentucky Colonels football team represented Eastern Kentucky University as a member of the Ohio Valley Conference (OVC) during the 1980 NCAA Division I-AA football season. Led by 17th-year head coach Roy Kidd, the Colonels compiled an overall record of 10–3, with a mark of 5–2 in conference play, and finished tied for second in the OVC. Eastern Kentucky advanced to the NCAA Division I-AA Championship Game and were defeated by Boise State.

== Schedule ==
Date	Opponent	Rank	Site	TV	Result	Attendance	Source
September 6	Kentucky State*		Hanger Field; Richmond, KY		W 24–21		
September 13	at Akron*		Rubber Bowl; Akron, OH		L 10–21	10,402	
September 20	Youngstown State*		Hanger Field; Richmond, KY		W 45–0	12,800	
October 4	at Austin Peay		Municipal Stadium; Clarksville, TN		W 23–10	4,000	
October 11	Middle Tennessee	No. 8	Hanger Field; Richmond, KY		W 24–0	8,800	
October 18	East Tennessee State*	No. 7	Hanger Field; Richmond, KY		W 25–6	9,500	
October 25	at No. 4 Western Kentucky	No. 5	L. T. Smith Stadium; Bowling Green, KY (rivalry)		L 10–13	19,700	
November 1	No. T–1 Murray State	No. T–11	Hanger Field; Richmond, KY		W 24–14		
November 8	at Tennessee Tech	No. T–5	Tucker Stadium; Cookeville, TN		W 48–7		
November 15	at East Carolina*	No. T–6	Ficklen Memorial Stadium; Greenville, NC		W 28–16	10,021	
November 22	Morehead State	No. 4	Hanger Field; Richmond, KY (rivalry)		W 18–14	11,800	
December 13	at No. 1 Lehigh*	No. 3	Taylor Stadium; Bethlehem, PA (NCAA Division I-AA Semifinal)		W 23–20	11,500	
December 20	vs. No. 7 Boise State*	No. 3	Hughes Stadium; Sacramento, CA (NCAA Division I-AA Championship Game)	ABC	L 29–31	8,157	
*Non-conference game; Rankings from AP Poll released prior to the game
