= 1980 NCAA Division I-AA football season =

American college football season

1980 NCAA Division I-AA season

Regular season
- Number of teams: 46
- Duration: August–November

Playoff
- Duration: December 13–December 20
- Championship date: December 20, 1980
- Championship site: Hughes Stadium, Sacramento, California
- Champion: Boise State

NCAA Division I-AA football seasons
- «1979 1981»

The 1980 NCAA Division I-AA football season, part of college football in the United States organized by the National Collegiate Athletic Association at the Division I-AA level. The third season of I-AA football began in August 1980 and four teams were selected for the postseason, with the national semifinals played on December 13. The 1980 NCAA Division I-AA Football Championship Game was played in the Camellia Bowl on December 20 at Hughes Stadium in Sacramento, California.

In a game with multiple lead changes, the Boise State Broncos won their first (and only) I-AA championship, defeating the defending national champion Eastern Kentucky Colonels, 31−29. With less than a minute to play, the Broncos drove eighty yards for the winning touchdown, a 14-yard pass from quarterback Joe Aliotti to tight end Duane Dlouhy with twelve seconds remaining.

== Conference changes and new programs ==
School	1979 Conference	1980 Conference
Akron	Mid-Continent (D-II)	Ohio Valley (I-AA)
Bethune–Cookman	SIAC (D-II)	MEAC (I-AA)
Delaware	D-II Independent	I-AA Independent
Florida A&M	I-AA Independent	MEAC (I-AA)
James Madison	D-II Independent	I-AA Independent
Maryland Eastern Shore	MEAC	Dropped Program
Nicholls State	D-II Independent	I-AA Independent
Southeastern Louisiana	D-II Independent	I-AA Independent

== Conference standings ==
1980 Big Sky Conference football standings
	Conf.					Overall
Team	W		L		T	W		L		T
No. 7 Boise State $^	6	–	1	–	0	10	–	3	–	0
Idaho	4	–	3	–	0	6	–	5	–	0
Nevada	4	–	3	–	0	6	–	4	–	1
Idaho State*	4	–	4	–	0	6	–	5	–	0
Weber State*	4	–	4	–	0	4	–	7	–	0
Montana State	3	–	4	–	0	4	–	6	–	0
Northern Arizona	3	–	4	–	0	5	–	6	–	0
Montana	1	–	6	–	0	3	–	7	–	0
$ – Conference champion; ^ – NCAA Division I-AA playoff participant; * – Idaho State and Weber State met twice in league play with each game counting as a half game.; Rankings from NCAA Division I-AA AP Poll

1980 Southwestern Athletic Conference football standings
	Conf.					Overall
Team	W		L		T	W		L		T
No. 2 Grambling State +^	5	–	1	–	0	10	–	2	–	0
Jackson State +	5	–	1	–	0	8	–	3	–	0
Alcorn State	3	–	3	–	0	6	–	4	–	0
Mississippi Valley State	3	–	3	–	0	5	–	5	–	0
Southern	3	–	3	–	0	4	–	6	–	1
Texas Southern	2	–	4	–	0	2	–	9	–	0
Prairie View A&M	0	–	6	–	0	2	–	8	–	0
$ – Conference champion; ^ – NCAA Division I-AA playoff participant; Rankings from Associated Press poll

1980 Mid-Eastern Athletic Conference football standings
	Conf.					Overall
Team	W		L		T	W		L		T
No. T–3 South Carolina State $	5	–	0	–	0	10	–	1	–	0
North Carolina A&T	3	–	2	–	0	9	–	3	–	0
Howard	2	–	2	–	1	6	–	2	–	2
Bethune–Cookman	2	–	2	–	1	5	–	4	–	1
Florida A&M	2	–	3	–	0	5	–	6	–	0
Delaware State	0	–	5	–	0	2	–	9	–	0
$ – Conference champion; Rankings from Associated Press poll

1980 Yankee Conference football standings
	Conf.					Overall
Team	W		L		T	W		L		T
No. 9 Boston University $	5	–	0	–	0	9	–	2	–	0
No. T–10 UMass	4	–	1	–	0	7	–	3	–	0
No. T–10 Connecticut	3	–	2	–	0	7	–	3	–	0
New Hampshire	2	–	3	–	0	6	–	4	–	0
Maine	1	–	4	–	0	4	–	7	–	0
Rhode Island	0	–	5	–	0	2	–	9	–	0
$ – Conference champion; Rankings from Associated Press poll

1980 Ohio Valley Conference football standings
	Conf.					Overall
Team	W		L		T	W		L		T
No. 5 Western Kentucky $	6	–	1	–	0	9	–	1	–	0
No. T–10 Murray State	5	–	2	–	0	9	–	2	–	0
No. T–3 Eastern Kentucky ^	5	–	2	–	0	10	–	3	–	0
Austin Peay	5	–	2	–	0	7	–	4	–	0
Akron	2	–	4	–	1	3	–	7	–	1
Morehead State	2	–	5	–	0	4	–	7	–	0
Middle Tennessee	2	–	5	–	0	2	–	8	–	0
Tennessee Tech	1	–	6	–	0	4	–	7	–	0
$ – Conference champion; ^ – NCAA Division I-AA playoff participant; Rankings from Associated Press poll

1980 NCAA Division I-AA independents football standings
	Conf.			Overall
Team	W	L	T	W		L		T
No. 1 Lehigh ^		–		9	–	1	–	2
No. 6 Delaware		–		9	–	2	–	0
Southeastern Louisiana		–		8	–	2	–	0
No. 8 Northwestern State		–		8	–	3	–	0
Portland State		–		8	–	3	–	0
Bucknell		–		6	–	4	–	0
James Madison		–		4	–	6	–	0
Lafayette		–		3	–	7	–	0
Nicholls State		–		2	–	9	–	0
Northeastern		–		2	–	9	–	0
^ – NCAA Division I-AA playoff participant; Rankings from Associated Press poll

== Conference champions ==
Conference champions

Big Sky Conference – Boise State
Mid-Eastern Athletic Conference – South Carolina State
Ohio Valley Conference – Western Kentucky
Southwestern Athletic Conference – Grambling State and Jackson State
Yankee Conference – Boston University

== Postseason ==
=== NCAA Division I-AA playoff bracket ===
The bracket consisted of three regional selections (West, East, and South) plus Eastern Kentucky as an at-large selection.

Semifinals; December 13; Campus sites
AtLg	Eastern Kentucky	23
East	Lehigh*	20
South	Grambling State	9
West	Boise State*	14

National Championship Game; December 20; Camellia Bowl; Hughes Stadium—Sacramento, CA
AtLg	Eastern Kentucky	29
West	Boise State	31

* Denotes host institution
