= List of Cal Poly, San Luis Obispo, CA people =

This article lists notable people (alumni, faculty or staff) of the California Polytechnic State University in San Luis Obispo.

== Alumni ==
=== Arts and media ===
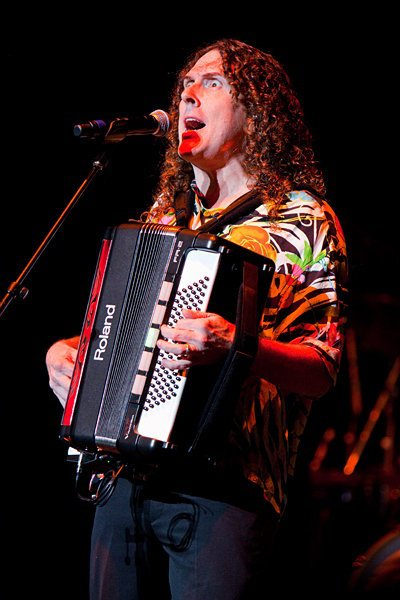
"Weird Al" Yankovic

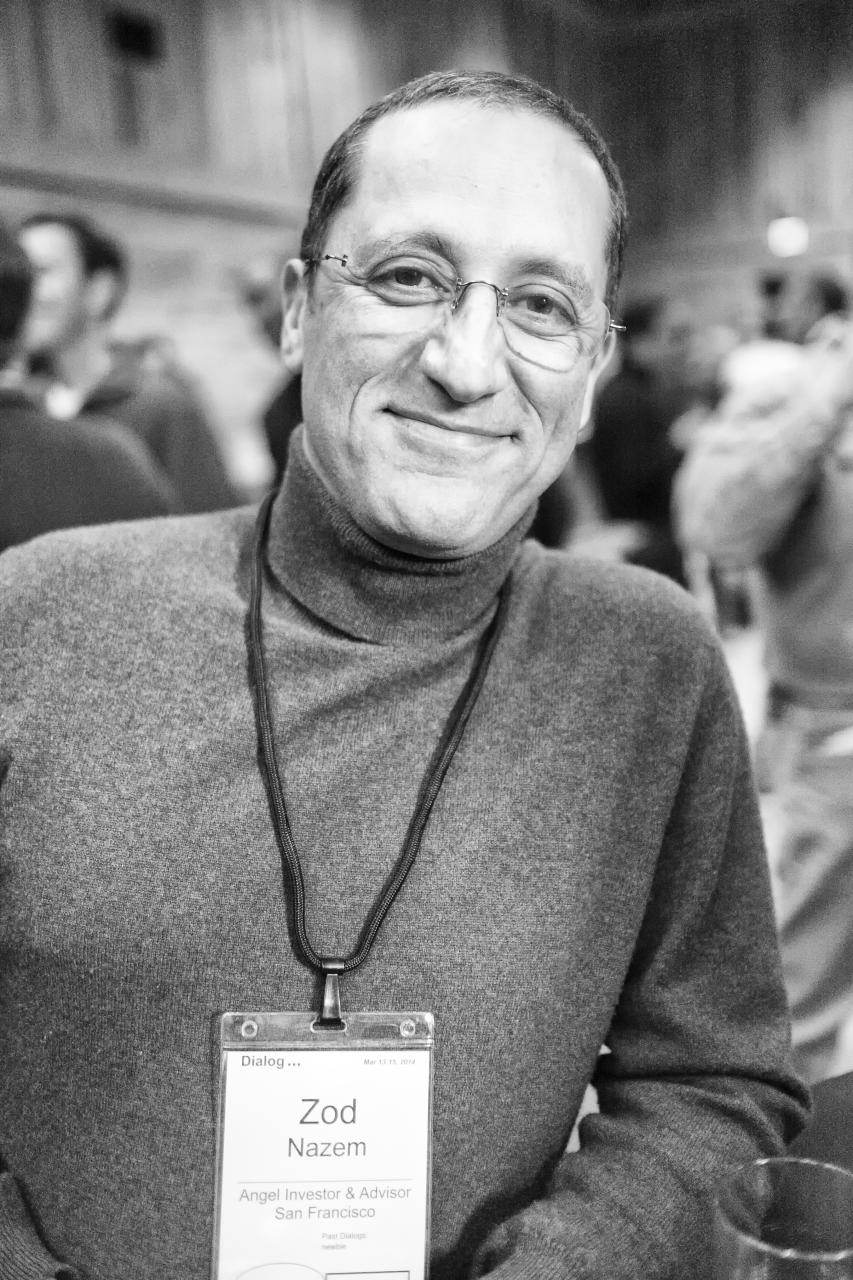
Farzad Nazem

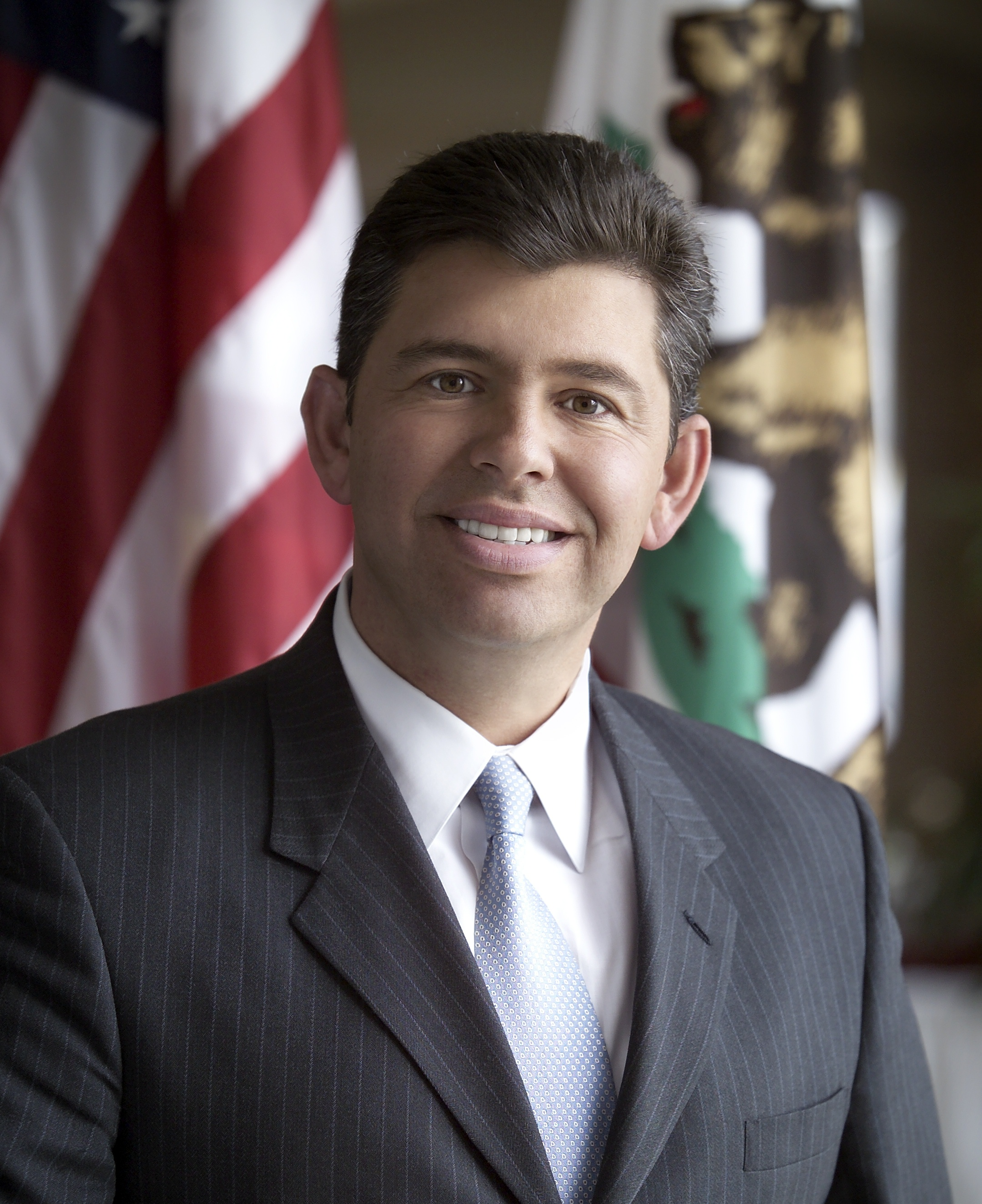
Abel Maldonado

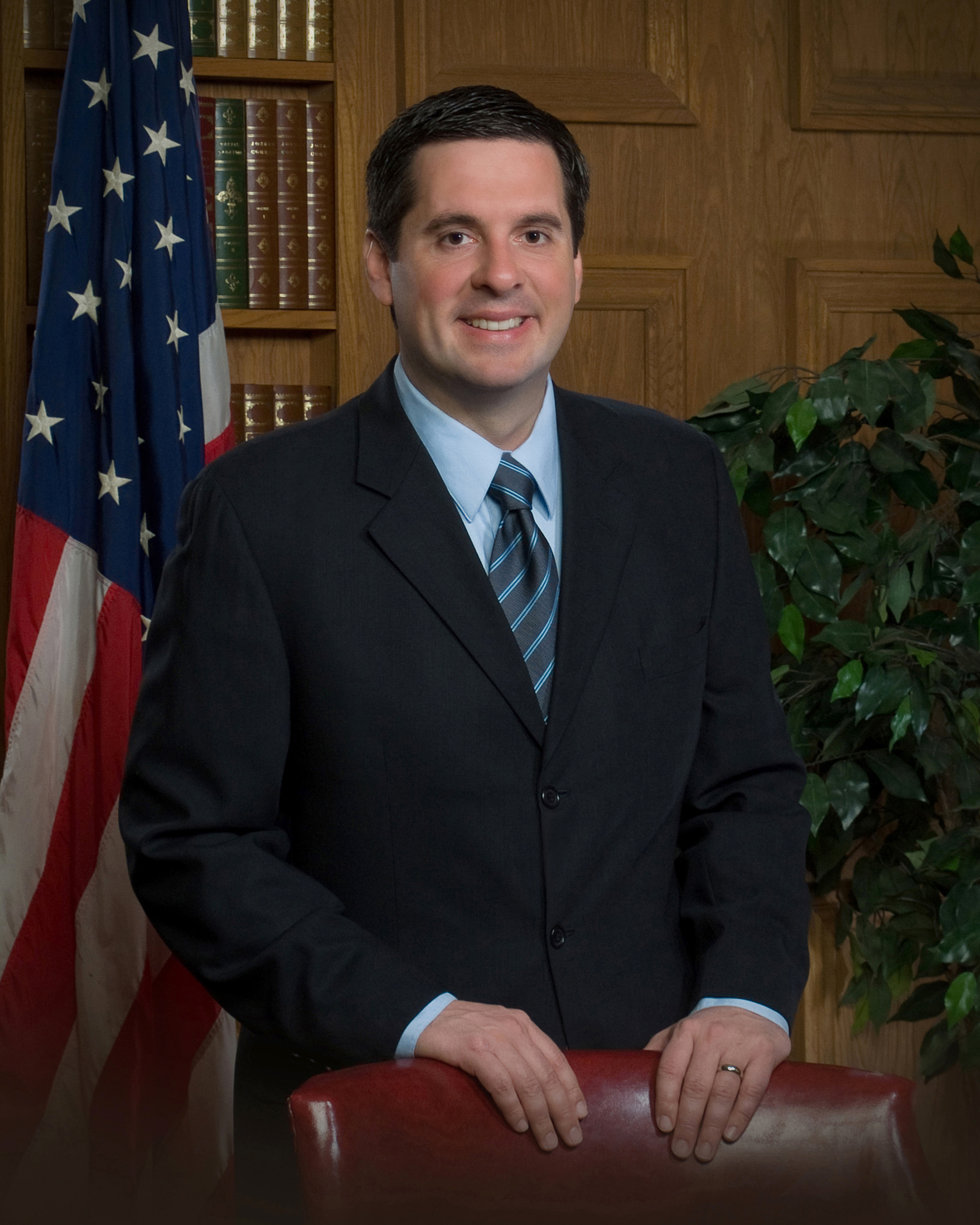
Devin Nunes

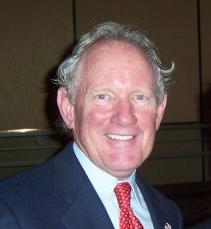
Bruce McPherson

- Pedro Armendáriz (1912–1963), character actor, award-winning leading man in dozens of films from the Golden Age of Mexican cinema
- Michael Berryman (born 1948), actor
- Dave Carnie (born 1969), writer, artist, former editor of Big Brother Magazine
- Irene Chan (born 1965), artist
- Margo Chase (1958–2017), graphic designer
- Luke Chueh, contemporary artist
- Michelle Franzen (born 1968), television and radio journalist for NBC News and ABC News
- Danny Gans (1956–2009), Las Vegas entertainer
- Nathan L. Good (born 1954), architect
- Paula Huston (born 1952), author
- John Madden (1936–2021), Pro Football Hall of Fame broadcaster, head coach, and player
- Cassie McFarland (born 1985), artist, designed the obverse of the 2014 National Baseball Hall of Fame commemorative coin
- Andy Paiko (born 1977), contemporary glass artist
- George Ramos (1947–2011), three-time Pulitzer Prize-winning journalist
- Suzanne Roberts (born 1970), poet, travel writer, and photographer
- M. Ward (born 1973), folk musician, singer-songwriter and guitarist
- "Weird Al" Yankovic (born 1959), rock parodist and entertainer

=== Business ===
- James Griffin Boswell, chairman of the board, J.G. Boswell Company
- Jamie Evans, cannabis professional
- Joel Flory, CEO and co-founder, VSCO
- Noel Lee, president and founder, Monster Cable
- Bob Mazzuca (B.S. History, 1970), chief scout executive of Boy Scouts of America
- Farzad Nazem (B.S. Computer Science, 1981), former chief technology officer of Yahoo!
- Peter Oppenheimer (B.S. Ag Business, 1985), former chief financial officer of Apple Computer
- Kirk Perron, founder of Jamba Juice
- William H. Swanson (B.S. Industrial Engineering, 1973) (born 1950), chairman and CEO of Raytheon

=== Politics and government ===
- Tom Berryhill, Stanislaus County supervisor, former California state senator
- Warren Church, Monterey County Board of Supervisors
- Jeff Denham, former United States representative for California's 10th congressional district
- Dennis Hollingsworth (born 1967), former California state senator
- Doug LaMalfa (1960–2026), former United States representative for California's 1st congressional district
- Abel Maldonado (born 1967), 47th lieutenant governor of California
- Bruce McPherson (born 1944), 30th California secretary of state
- Mohammadreza Nematzadeh, Minister of Labour and Minister of Industry and Mine in the Islamic Republic of Iran
- Devin Nunes, former United States representative for California's 22nd Congressional District
- George Radanovich, former United States representative for California's 19th congressional district
- Robert Tapella, 25th Public Printer of the United States

=== Science and technology ===
- Michael Alsbury, commercial astronaut, Virgin Galactic test pilot; killed in the 2014 Virgin Galactic crash
- Tory Bruno, rocket scientist and CEO of United Launch Alliance
- Greg Chamitoff (born 1962), astronaut
- Robert L. Gibson (born 1946), astronaut
- Victor Glover (born 1976), astronaut
- Kiran Gupta, American scholar
- David Haussler, professor at University of California, Santa Cruz
- Mark Lucovsky, software architect and a part of the team that designed Windows NT
- Kristen Maitland, optical scientist and Fellow of SPIE
- Alison Murray, biochemist and Antarctic researcher
- Aaron Peckham, owner and creator of UrbanDictionary
- Burt Rutan (born 1943), designer of SpaceShipOne and Rutan Voyager
- Peter Siebold, commercial astronaut, Virgin Galactic test pilot
- Frederick W. Sturckow (born 1961), astronaut
- Kyle Wiens, co-founder of iFixit

=== Athletics ===
==== Baseball ====
- Justin Bruihl (born 1997), MLB pitcher
- Kevin Correia (born 1980), MLB pitcher
- Casey Fien (born 1983), MLB pitcher
- Mitch Haniger (born 1990), MLB outfielder for the San Francisco Giants
- Mike Krukow (born 1952), former MLB pitcher and current broadcast announcer
- Brooks Lee (born 2001), MLB shortstop
- Bud Norris (born 1985), MLB pitcher
- Garrett Olson (born 1983), former MLB pitcher
- John Orton (born 1965), former MLB catcher
- Ozzie Smith (born 1954), MLB Hall of Fame shortstop
- Dean Treanor (born 1947), manager of the Indianapolis Indians
- Joey Wagman (born 1991), pitcher
- Bryan Woo (born 2000), MLB pitcher for the Seattle Mariners

==== Basketball ====
- Sean Chambers (born 1965), PBA player for the Alaska Aces
- Chris Eversley (born 1991), ABL player for the Malaysia Dragons
- Mike LaRoche (born 1946), ABA player for the Los Angeles Stars
- David Nwaba (born 1993), NBA player for the Chicago Bulls
- Joe Prunty (born 1969), NBA assistant coach for the Atlanta Hawks
- Derek Stockalper (born 1984), FIBA player for Swiss National Team
- Drake U'u (born 1990), NBL player for the Perth Wildcats

==== Football ====
- Marijon Ancich, high school football coach with the most wins in California history
- Ramses Barden (born 1986), former NFL wide receiver
- Bobby Beathard (born 1937), NFL Hall of Fame GM
- Jordan Beck (born 1983), NFL linebacker
- Alex Bravo (born 1930), former NFL defensive back
- Courtney Brown (born 1984), former NFL defensive back
- Sal Cesario (born 1963), former NFL offensive guard
- Jim Criner (born 1940), college football head coach
- Nick Dzubnar (born 1991), linebacker for San Diego Chargers
- Chris Gocong (born 1983), NFL linebacker
- Asa Jackson (born 1989), NFL cornerback
- Mel Kaufman (1958–2009), former NFL linebacker Washington Redskins, 1981–1988
- John Madden (1936–2021), Pro Football Hall of Fame broadcaster, head coach, and player
- Dana Nafziger (born 1953), NFL player
- Ted Tollner (born 1940), former NFL coach
- Cecil Turner (born 1944), former NFL WR/KR Chicago Bears, 1968–1973, selected to 1971 NFL Pro Bowl
- Fred Whittingham (born 1939), former NFL linebacker and coach

==== Other athletes ====
- Kip Colvey (born 1994), professional soccer player for the Colorado Rapids in Major League Soccer; represents his home country New Zealand in international FIFA tournaments
- Sharon Day (born 1985), former NCAA women's high jump champion, 2011 USA outdoor national heptathlon champion
- Justin Dhillon (born 1995), professional soccer player, MLS Cup 2019 champion
- Sean Johnston (born 1990), American World Rally Championship driver
- Dean Karnazes, ultramarathoner
- Karen Kraft, U.S. silver medalist in coxless pair rowing at the 1996 Summer Olympics and a bronze medalist in coxless pairs at the 2000 Summer Olympics
- Gene Lenz, All-American college swimmer, 1960 Summer Olympics finalist in the 400-meter freestyle
- Chuck Liddell (born 1969), wrestler; retired mixed martial artist, former UFC Light Heavyweight Champion, and UFC Hall of Fame member
- Gan McGee, professional MMA fighter
- Chad Mendes (born 1985), 2008 NCAA wrestling runner-up at 141 lbs., professional MMA fighter, UFC featherweight contender
- Gina Miles, U.S. silver medalist in individual eventing at the 2008 Summer Olympics
- Borislav Novachkov, Olympic wrestler
- Gina Oceguera (born 1977), World Cup soccer player
- Anton Peterlin (born 1987), soccer player
- Victor Plata (born 1973), USA Olympian in the triathlon
- Loren Roberts (born 1955), professional golfer on the PGA Tour
- Monty Roberts (born 1935), professional horse trainer, former rodeo rider, and author
- Taylor Spivey (born 1991), college swimmer, USA Olympian in the triathlon
- Stephanie Brown Trafton (born 1979), U.S. gold medalist in discus throw at the 2008 Summer Olympics
- Maggie Vessey (born 1981), professional 800-meter runner
- Barton Williams (born 1956), NCAA All-American 400m-hurdler

=== Others ===
- Scott C. Black (born 1952), lieutenant general (United States Army, Retired), 37th Judge Advocate General of the United States Army; the first lieutenant general to hold that position
- Wil Dasovich, Filipino American YouTuber
- Shallon Lester (born 1981) American gossip columnist, author, editor, social media personality, and YouTuber.
- Maya Higa (born 1998), conservationist, falconer, wildlife rehabilitator, and Twitch streamer
- Bill Nelson (born 1944), bull rider
- Laci Peterson (born 1975)
- Scott Peterson, convicted murderer
- Kristin Smart (born 1977)
- Gilbert H. Stork, president of Cuesta College

== Faculty ==
- David W. Hafemeister, professor of physics
