= Oceguera =

Oceguera is a surname. Notable people with the surname include:

- John Oceguera (born 1968), Native American politician from Nevada
- Gina Oceguera (born 1977), Mexican-American soccer player
