= Cal Poly Mustangs =

Sports teams of California Polytechnic State University, San Luis Obispo

- University: California Polytechnic State University
- Nickname: Mustangs
- NCAA: Division I (FCS)
- Conference: Big West (primary); Big Sky (football); Pac-12 (wrestling)
- Athletic director: Carter Henderson
- Location: San Luis Obispo, California
- Varsity teams: 21 (10 men's, 11 women's)
- Football stadium: Alex G. Spanos Stadium
- Basketball arena: Robert A. Mott Athletics Center
- Baseball stadium: Robin Baggett Stadium
- Softball stadium: Bob Janssen Field
- Soccer stadium: Alex G. Spanos Stadium
- Other venues: Anderson Aquatic Center; Miller and Capriotti Athletics Complex; Swanson Beach Volleyball Complex; Mustang Tennis Complex
- Colors: Poly green, copper gold, and stadium gold
- Mascot: Musty
- Marching band: Pride of the Pacific
- Fight song: Ride High, You Mustangs
- Website: gopoly.com/index.aspx

The Cal Poly Mustangs are the athletic teams representing California Polytechnic State University in San Luis Obispo, California. The university fields twenty teams and competes in NCAA Division I; they are primarily members of the Big West Conference, but the football team plays in the Big Sky Conference, the wrestling team is an affiliate member of the Pac-12 Conference, and the indoor track & field (specific to the winter-season portion of the schedule) squads are independent.

== Nickname ==
The Cal Poly official team nickname is the "Mustangs." The nickname was chosen in a 1925 vote by the students. The two finalists were "Mustangs" and "Mules" and the students chose "Mustangs."

== History ==
=== Cal Poly athletic history ===
==== Early athletic program history ====
The Cal Poly Mustangs athletic department's first sports team was fielded in 1907 as the men's basketball team played their first game. The university was not yet a four-year institution, but the school sponsored sports.

==== Student referendum and move to NCAA Division I ====
Cal Poly put a referendum vote to its student body on Nov. 20–21, 1991. The referendum passed, with students voting to elevate all 16 NCAA sports teams at the time from Division II of the NCAA to Division I by the 1994–95 school year, passed by 267 votes in the largest voter turnout in school history, featuring 10,369 total votes cast, with 5,318 (or 51.2 percent) passing the measure. This move would be accommodated by the student body individually paying a total of $35 more per quarter by 1994 (steadily going in increments from the incumbent $8 Athletics fee at the time to $43 per quarter by 1994).

Afterward, the NCAA officially certified Cal Poly as a Division I-AA football school on August 9, 1993. Its first year of playing at the Division I level in all sports (volleyball and wrestling were already Division I, being the two exceptions) was 1994–95.

==== Conference alignment ====
Announced October 14, 1994, Cal Poly joined the Big West Conference for a majority of its sports programs, from the American West Conference. The 1996–97 school year then marked Cal Poly's first season competing in the Big West.

Cal Poly was accepted into the Big Sky Conference as an affiliate member for football on September 7, 2010. The Mustangs' first-ever Big Sky game was played on September 22, 2012, a 28–20 home win over UC Davis.

==== Adidas partnership ====
On May 25, 2017, Cal Poly announced an exclusive partnership with adidas. The partnership beginning in June 2017 would provide official footwear, apparel and various equipment items.

==== Academic progress rate public recognition awards ====
In May 2019, Cal Poly received a department-record seven Public Recognition Awards from the NCAA for Academic Progress Rate performance for the 2017–18 academic year. The seven awards included six from Big West Conference teams in the department, the most throughout the Big West (edging UC Davis by one award). The Mustangs collected four NCAA APR awards for the 2018–19 year, again leading the BWC.

=== Philanthropic endeavors ===
From 2007 through 2019, the Cal Poly softball program raised over $21,900 for the Hearst Cancer Resource Center with its annual StrikeOut Cancer Challenge event.

From 2012 to 2019, Cal Poly student-athletes raised $11,179 through the Big West Conference's annual February Coin Drive, with previous causes also including the Jessie Rees Foundation and CURE International. In 2019, Cal Poly student-athletes raised more than $3,300 for Hearst Cancer Resource Center at nearby French Hospital as part of the 12th annual February Coin Drive. The total was the most Cal Poly has raised in a single year and ranked second among the conference's nine universities for 2019.

Starting in December 2015, Cal Poly student-athletes have been actively involved with the Salvation Army's Adopt-an-Angel program, purchasing toys, clothing and gift cards while collecting donations to benefit local families in the San Luis Obispo area. In 2017, Mustang student-athletes adopted 50 children from 24 families, an increase of three sponsored children from the 2016 season. The December 2018 drive saw Cal Poly student-athletes adopt 32 children for the program.

=== Controversies ===
==== NCAA infractions ====
In 1987 while competing as an NCAA Division II school, the National Collegiate Athletic Association found the athletic department guilty of infractions relating to the men's basketball program. During the course of the investigation, then head coach Ernie Wheeler resigned from his position and was later publicly reprimanded.

As the department was transitioning from Division II to NCAA Division I in 1994, the department self-reported violations related to the baseball program. Cal Poly identified head coach Steve McFarland as having given improper financial aid to both players and members of his coaching staff. In 1995, the NCAA accepted Cal Poly's self-imposed penalties which included forfeiture of their NCAA Division II baseball championship and other top finishes and a postseason ban.

In April 2019, the athletic department was placed on probation for multiple years and was forced to vacate regular season championships and conference tournament records by the NCAA. The NCAA reported years worth of infractions involving 265 athletes across 18 sports. Additionally, the school must now inform all recruits about the department's infractions prior to official visits. In deciding on the severity of punishment, the NCAA noted Cal Poly's two earlier infractions from 1987 and 1995. The athletic department appealed, but the decision was upheld in February 2020.

==== Other athletic department controversies ====
In November 2013, a student assistant coach who previously played for the Cal Poly Mustangs football team was shot in a drug deal. The following year in August 2014, further problems beset the football team when 5 current Cal Poly student-athletes were arrested and charged with a total of 23 felonies which made national headlines. The players were subsequently suspended indefinitely from the team.

California Polytechnic State University president, Jeffrey Armstrong, stated that the August 2014 event "bears striking commonalities" with the November 2013 event, which was also noted by San Luis Obispo Police Department Chief Steve Gesell as having "disturbing" similarities. Armstrong, with athletic director, Don Oberhelman, launched an investigation into the football team's potential further involvement with illegal drugs and criminal activity and rolled out a new drug policy for the athletics department. It was reported by The Tribune that cost was a factor cited by Cal Poly when testing just 41 of its 540 student-athletes for banned substances within the last year. Oberhelman later stated that some of the players involved "... should not have been at Cal Poly." He also stated that he had heard of illegal drug usage among members of the football team. According to current and former players who spoke with The Tribune confidentially, the consensus was that illegal drug usage at the football program was widespread, with estimates ranging between 40% and 60% of the student-athletes. Athletic director Oberhelman kept faith in head coach Tim Walsh and his coaching staff despite Randy Hanson, a former coach brought on by Walsh, had multiple felony charges brought upon him just a few years earlier. One of the student-athletes' lawyers in the August 2014 event later accused head coach Tim Walsh in court of coercion to talk to the police without a lawyer present.

In 2014, Cal Poly went to court to cover up or remove mentions of Moriarty Enterprises from the scoreboard at Alex G. Spanos Stadium. Al Moriarty, a former Cal Poly football player who was inducted to the Cal Poly Hall of Fame in 2002, purchased naming rights to the scoreboard in 2009 for a total of $625,000. He was convicted of running a ponzi scheme and Cal Poly argued that they were "...suffering harm by having the name 'Moriarty Enterprises' remain on the scoreboard." When bankruptcy trustees asked Cal Poly for the money to be returned to benefit Moriarty's creditors, Cal Poly declined. After nearly a year in court, an agreement was reached wherein Cal Poly repaid $480,000 of the original donation to remove mentions of Moriarty, leaving the school with a $145,000 profit from the original sponsorship.

In April 2015, a football student-athlete was arrested for driving under the influence, a felony, after crashing his car. A number of the passengers in the car were also football student-athletes. Previously in March 2011, a different Cal Poly football player was arrested for a DUI and ultimately chose to transfer out of the program.

On March 7, 2025, Cal Poly announced it was cutting both men's and women's swimming and diving effective immediately due to budget concerns, associated in part with the impact of House v. NCAA. This move proved particularly controversial due to the lack of warning to the student athletes. Moreover, on August 1, 2025, Cal Poly announced it was elevating Stunt, an emerging sport for women, from club to varsity status for the 2026 season, where they will compete independently. Cal Poly won the club championship in 2023. Cal Poly is also pursuing the addition of women's flag football as early as 2027.

== Sports sponsored ==
Big West logo in Cal Poly colors

Men's sports	Women's sports
Baseball	Basketball
Basketball	Beach volleyball
Cross country	Cross country
Football	Golf
Golf	Soccer
Soccer	Softball
Tennis	Stunt
Track and field^{†}	Tennis
Wrestling	Track and field^{†}
	Volleyball
† – Track and field includes both indoor and outdoor

=== Baseball ===
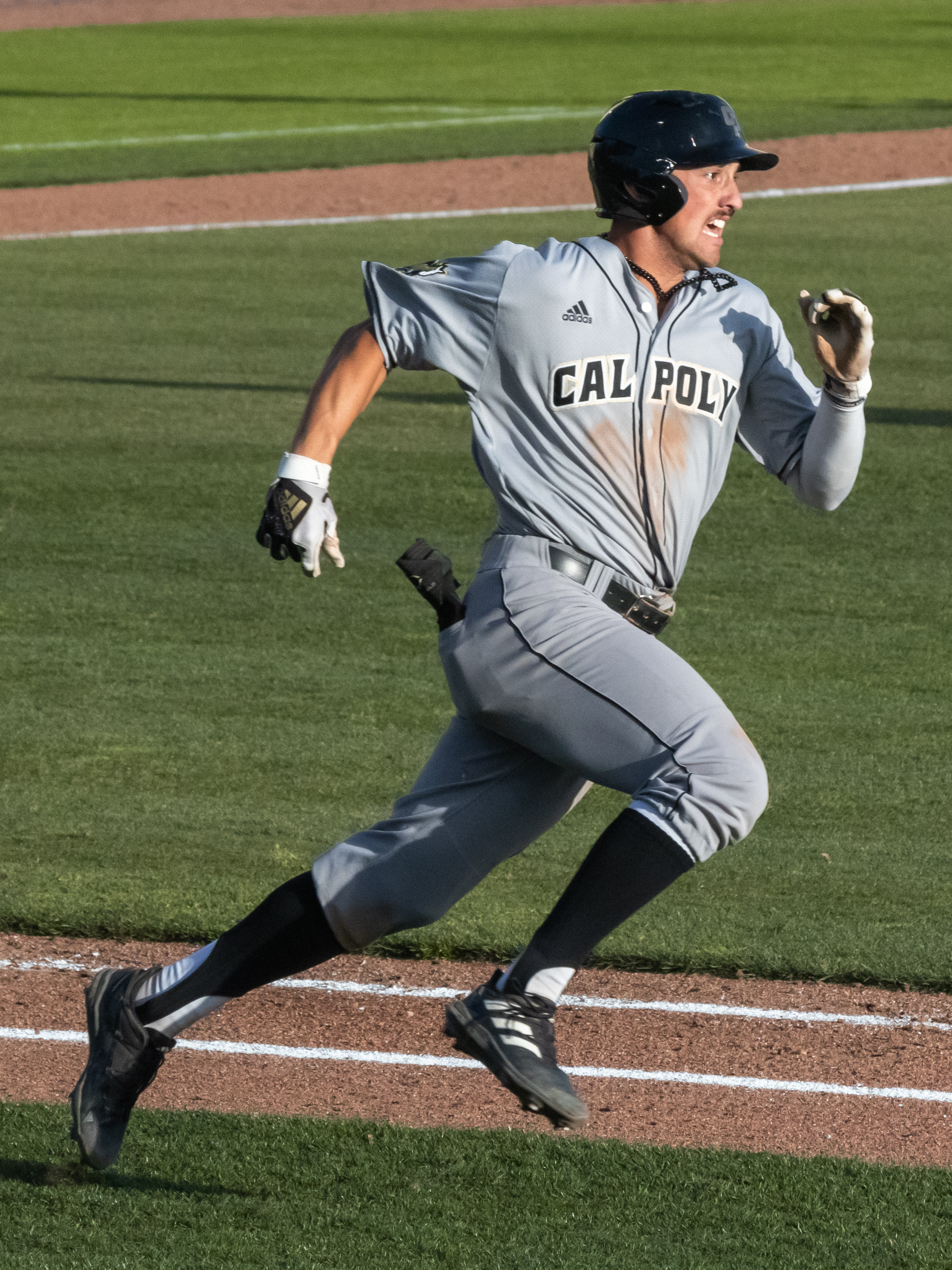
Brooks Lee playing baseball for the Mustangs in 2022

The Cal Poly Mustangs baseball program first fielded a team in 1948.

=== Men's basketball ===
The Cal Poly Mustangs men's basketball team's first season was 1907 and its first season as a four-year institution was in 1941–42. The team had its most successful year in 2014, when the team won the Big West Tournament, clinching its first NCAA basketball tournament bid in school history at the Division I level.

=== Women's basketball ===
The Cal Poly Mustangs women's basketball team's first season was the 1974–75 season.

=== Women's beach volleyball ===
Cal Poly beach volleyball was founded in July 2013. In February 2016, Cal Poly hired Todd Rogers, a 2008 Olympic gold medalist in the sport, as its new head coach. Cal Poly has reached 2 Final Fours (2024 & 2025) and has reached the NCAA Tournament in 5 of the last 6 seasons starting with 2019.

=== Men's and women's cross country ===
In 2019, coach Mark Conover and his men's squad collected their fourth straight Big West Conference title and the men's team's 17th crown in a 22-year span. Their last national placing as a team was in 2011, when they finished 28th at the National Cross Country Championships. In 2018, the women's program, coached by Priscilla Bayley, captured its third Big West Conference crown in a four-year stretch.

The men's cross country team has appeared in the NCAA Division I Championships as a full squad seven times, with their highest finish being 10th place in the 2004–05 school year. The Cal Poly women's cross country team hasn't made the NCAA Division I Championships as a full team, but in 2018 advanced both Miranda Daschian and Katie Izzo as individuals to the NCAA National Cross Country Championships in Madison, Wisconsin. Peyton Bilo was the program's most recent All-American, taking 23rd place at the 2016 national championships as a sophomore. Conover, the 1988 U.S. Olympic Marathon Trials champion, passed in April 2022 following a battle with cancer.

On June 20, 2022, Ryan Vanhoy, previously coaching at Ole Miss, was appointed to lead Cal Poly's program as track and field and cross country director.

==== Team USA members ====
- Cal Poly alumnus Phillip Reid represented Team USA at the Great Edinburgh International Run in Scotland in 2012–13 and at the North America/Central America/Caribbean Championships in Jamaica in 2013.

Year	Gender	Ranking	Points
1999	Men	No. 29	607
2003	Men	No. 13	401
2004	Men	No. 10	333
2006	Men	No. 13	441
2007	Men	No. 11	367
2008	Men	No. 23	513
2011	Men	No. 28	680

=== Football ===
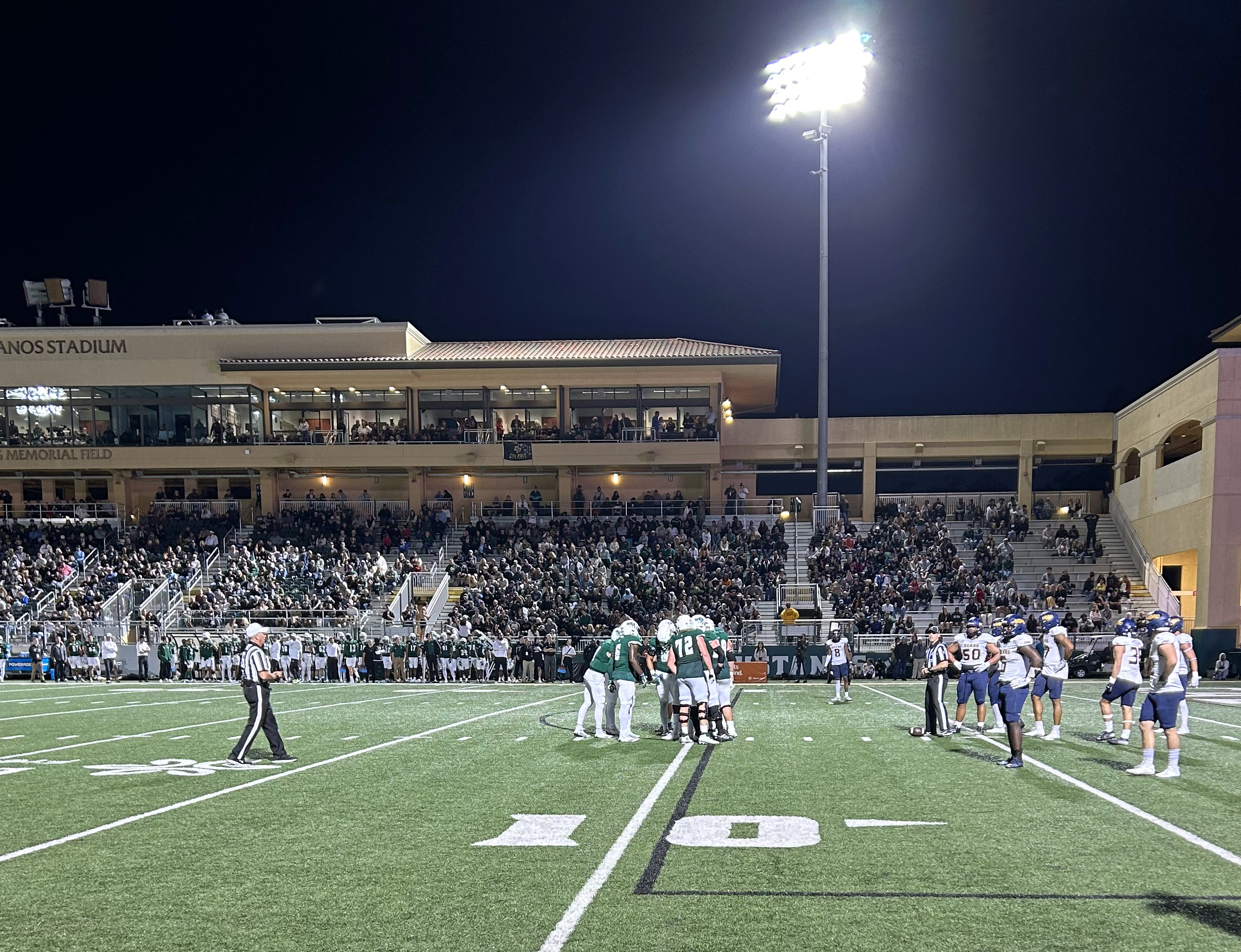
The Cal Poly football team's offense huddles in the red zone during a Big Sky Conference home win over Northern Colorado in 2023

Mustang Football plays in the Big Sky Conference, competing in the NCAA Division I FCS. Prior to joining the Big Sky Conference in 2012, the team competed in the Great West Conference and was the first Great West Football Conference participant in the Football Championship Subdivision playoffs. Each year Cal Poly plays rival UC Davis in the annual Battle for the Golden Horseshoe.

The Cal Poly Mustangs have an NCAA Division I FCS Tournament record of 1–4 through four appearances:

Year	Round	Opponent	Result
2005	First round Quarterfinals	Montana; Texas State	W 35–21; L 7–14
2008	First round	Weber State	L 35–49
2012	Second Round	Sam Houston State	L 16–18
2016	First round	San Diego	L 21–35

=== Men's golf ===
==== Pro alumni ====
- Former Mustang Loren Roberts has earned more than 25 career pro wins at various tournaments.
- Cal Poly's Travis Bertoni, who won three consecutive Big West Conference Golfer of the Year awards from 2004 to 2006, played at the U.S. Open in 2008.
- Former Mustang Justin De Los Santos played at the British Open in 2022.

=== Women's golf ===
Cal Poly won the 2017 Big West Conference championship at Oak Quarry Golf Club in Riverside, California, besting the field with a combined total of 887 strokes. After winning the title, the Mustangs advanced to their first Division I NCAA Regional tournament, finishing 16th in Albuquerque, New Mexico at UNM South Championship Golf Course. Cal Poly also won back-to-back BWC team championships in 2021 and 2022.

=== Men's soccer ===
The Cal Poly Mustangs men's soccer team has had success in recent years. In 2008, coach Paul Holocher led his team to the NCAA Division I tournament; they went on to beat UCLA and ended up losing to UC Irvine in the second round. Coach Steve Sampson led the team back to the NCAA tournament in 2015, and three Cal Poly players were selected in the 2016 MLS SuperDraft, tied for the seventh-most nationally.

Cal Poly soccer has a strong fan base, averaging 2,017 fans per match in 2019, ranking No. 5 across the country. In 2011, CollegeSoccerNews.com chose Cal Poly vs. UC Santa Barbara as the No. 1 rivalry in college soccer. Since 2007, the rivalry matches have regularly drawn upwards of 8,000 fans.

The men's soccer team have an NCAA Division I Tournament record of 1–3 through three appearances and have never advanced past the second round:

Year	Round	Opponent	Result
1995	First round	UCLA	L 1–2
2008	First round Second Round	UCLA; UC Irvine	W 1–0; L 0–3
2015	First round	UCLA	L 0–2

=== Women's soccer ===
Cal Poly's women's soccer program is coached by Bernardo Silva, who took over following the retirement of Alex Crozier (with a won-loss-draw career record of 325–234–70 overall in 33 seasons, ranking No. 36 in NCAA history for career head coaching victories). The Mustangs have an NCAA Division I Tournament record of 1–6 through six appearances, with the win coming over Fresno State in the first round in 1999, 2–1 in Fresno. Cal Poly fell 3–1 at Stanford in the second round.

==== Pro alumni ====
- Gina Oceguera, WUSA (35th overall selection of the 2000 draft), Bay Area CyberRays
- Alyssa Giannetti, Arna-Bjornar, Toppserien
- Elise Krieghoff, Boston Breakers, NWSL
- Camille Lafaix, FC Girondins de Bordeaux, D1 Arkema (France)

Year	Round	Opponent	Result
1999	First round Second Round	Fresno State; Stanford	W 2–1; L 1–3
2000	First round	Santa Clara	L 1–3
2002	First round	Stanford	L 0–4
2003	First round	Arizona State	L 1–3
2004	First round	Stanford	L 0–2
2025	First round	Stanford	L 1–3

=== Softball ===
==== Pro draft choices ====
- Sierra Hyland, P: 2017 NPF 4th overall (Chicago Bandits)/2020 Olympian

=== Men's and women's track and field ===
==== All-Americans ====
Combined, all-time in its history, including individual national champions, Cal Poly has produced 527 total All-Americans specific to track & field. 77 of these All-America honors have been awarded in Division I (with 32 to men and 45 to women, including AIAW certificates as well as indoor-season accolades), and 450 All-America honors were earned in Division II (248 to men and 202 to women).

==== Olympians ====
- Reynaldo Brown, 1968 (U.S.)
- Mathyas Michael, 1968 (Ethiopia)
- Mohinder Gill, 1972 (India)
- Patrice Donnelly, 1976 (U.S.)
- Karin Smith, 1976/1980/1984/1988 (U.S.)
- Bart Williams, 1980 (U.S.)
- Carmelo Rios, 1984 (Puerto Rico)
- Sue McNeal-Rembao, 1992 (U.S.)
- Sharon Hanson-Lowery, 1996 (U.S.)
- Stephanie Brown Trafton, 2004/2008/2012 (U.S.)
- Sharon Day-Monroe, 2008/2012 (U.S.)

=== Women's indoor volleyball ===
The women's indoor volleyball team has been one of the school's best sports programs in recent years and in the 1980s when the team reached No. 1 in the nation in 1985 in the AVCA Coaches Poll. On October 12, 1985, Cal Poly, coached by Mike Wilton, won the NIVT banner at UCLA before a crowd of about 2,500 fans, 3–1. Soon after, in the October 22 Top 25 Poll, the Mustangs were voted as the No. 1 team in the country. Stanford took back over the top spot in the week after.

In 2007, the team captured its second straight Big West title by posting a 15–1 conference record and a 23–8 record overall, and made it to the third round of the playoffs before losing to Stanford in the Sweet 16. The team also went 23–6 in 2006. Cal Poly returned to the AVCA national rankings and NCAA tournament in both 2017 & 2018 upon winning back-to-back Big West Conference championships, and then advanced to the second round of the NCAA tournament in 2019.

The team has an NCAA Division I Tournament record of 17–18 through eighteen total appearances.

Year	Round	Opponent	Result
1981	Regional semifinals Regional Finals	Northwestern; Pacific	W 3–0; L 1–3
1982	First round Regional semifinals Regional Finals	Pittsburgh; Arizona State; Hawaii	W 3–0; W 3–1; L 1–3
1983	First round Regional semifinals Regional Finals	San Jose State; UC Santa Barbara; Pacific	W 3–1; W 3–2; L 0–3
1984	Regional semifinals	Fresno State	L 2–3
1985	First round Regional semifinals Regional Finals	UC Santa Barbara; San Jose State; Pacific	W 3–2; W 3–0; L 0–3
1986	First round	San Jose State	L 1–3
1987	First round Regional semifinals	UC Santa Barbara; Hawaii	W 3–1; L 0–3
1988	First round	Hawaii	L 0–3
1989	First round Regional semifinals	UC Santa Barbara; Hawaii	W 3–2; L 2–3
1999	First round	Michigan State	L 1–3
2000	First round Second Round	South Florida; USC	W 3–1; L 0–3
2002	First round	Pepperdine	L 0–3
2006	First round	Michigan; California	W 3–1; L 1–3
2007	First round Second Round; Regional semifinals	Xavier; Purdue; Stanford	W 3–0; W 3–0; L 0–3
2017	First round Second Round	Denver; UCLA	W 3–0; L 1–3
2018	First round	San Diego	L 1–3
2019	First round Second Round	Georgia; Stanford	W 3–2; L 0–3
2025	First round Second Round; Regional semifinals	No. 22 BYU (5); No. 14 USC (4); No. 2 Kentucky (1)	W 3–2; W 3–2; L 0–3

=== Wrestling ===
The wrestling program at Cal Poly competes as a member of the Pac-12 Conference, which is traditionally one of the strongest conferences in college wrestling. Cal Poly has had two wrestlers (Tom Kline & Mark DiGirolamo) win the Division I NCAA Wrestling Championship and 50 wrestlers earn All-American honors at the Division I level. In addition to the program's success at the NCAA Championships, the program has crowned one champion at the National Collegiate Open Wrestling Championship. On January 30, 2014, Cal Poly hosted Oregon State in a very rare outdoor wrestling match. The match took place in Cal Poly's University Union Plaza following the weekly UU hour. The only other known outdoor matches have been hosted by The Citadel Bulldogs, including one during the 2012–13 season. Arizona State also wrestled Arizona outdoors in the 1970s.

The team competes in Mott Athletics Center on campus, opened back in 1960, seating over 3,000 people for home dual meets and tournaments.

Three former Mustang wrestlers after graduation went on to compete in mixed martial arts, more specifically the Ultimate Fighting Championships. The first is Chad Mendes who was a national runner-up at 141 lbs. in 2008, competing for the UFC since 2011 (challenging for a UFC featherweight title in 2012). The most famous wrestling alum is Chuck Liddell, who graduated in 1995 and is now a retired UFC Hall of Fame inductee being a former UFC Light heavyweight champion. More recently, 2020 NWCA All-American 197-pounder Tom Lane made his pro fighting debut in the middleweight classification, opening with a win in October 2021.

Prior to joining the Division I ranks via the Pac-12 (then the Pac-10) in 1987, Cal Poly was dominant in the College Division/Division II, winning the 1966 national championship and seven consecutive NCAA titles from 1968 to 1974.

The men's wrestling team has appeared in the NCAA Division I tournament 51 times, with their highest finish being fifth place in 1969.

== NCAA championships and tournaments ==
=== Division I appearances in team bracket/meet ===
The Cal Poly Mustangs have competed in the NCAA tournament or in NCAA Division I Finals Meets on a team-scored basis across 19 active sports (10 men's and 9 women's).

- Baseball (4): 2009, 2013, 2014, 2025
- Beach volleyball (5): 2019, 2021, 2022, 2024, 2025
- Men's basketball (1): 2014
- Women's basketball (1): 2013
- Men's cross country (7): 1999, 2003, 2004, 2006, 2007, 2008, 2011
- Football (4): 2005, 2008, 2012, 2016
- Men's soccer (3): 1995, 2008, 2015
- Women's soccer (6): 1999, 2000, 2002, 2003, 2004, 2025
- Softball (2): 2007, 2009
- Men's swimming and diving (3): 1958, 1959, 2014
- Women's golf (4): 2017, 2021, 2022, 2023
- Men's tennis (3): 2011, 2012, 2014
- Women's tennis (3): 2003, 2011, 2024
- Men's indoor track and field (3): 1971, 1973, 2025
- Women's indoor track and field (7): 1983, 1999, 2000, 2003, 2004, 2005, 2008
- Men's outdoor track and field (13): 1960, 1961, 1964, 1998, 1999, 2000, 2001, 2002, 2004, 2005, 2007, 2023, 2025
- Women's outdoor track and field (13): 1995, 1996, 1998, 1999, 2001, 2002, 2003, 2004, 2005, 2007, 2008, 2009, 2011
- Women's volleyball (18): 1981, 1982, 1983, 1984, 1985, 1986, 1987, 1988, 1989, 1999, 2000, 2002, 2006, 2007, 2017, 2018, 2019, 2025
- Wrestling (51): 1958, 1968, 1969, 1972, 1975, 1976, 1977, 1978, 1979, 1980, 1981, 1982, 1983, 1984, 1985, 1986, 1988, 1989, 1990, 1991, 1992, 1993, 1994, 1995, 1996, 1997, 1998, 1999, 2000, 2001, 2002, 2003, 2004, 2005, 2006, 2007, 2008, 2009, 2010, 2011, 2012, 2014, 2015, 2017, 2018, 2019, 2021, 2022, 2023, 2024, 2025

=== NCAA titles won ===
Cal Poly has never won a team national championship at the NCAA Division I level.

Cal Poly previously won 35 national championships at the NCAA Division II level.

- Men's cross country (2): 1978, 1979
- Women's cross country (10): 1982, 1983, 1984, 1985, 1986, 1987, 1988, 1989, 1991
- Football (1): 1980
- Men's outdoor track and field (6): 1968, 1969, 1970, 1979, 1980, 1981
- Women's outdoor track and field (6): 1982, 1983, 1984, 1989, 1990, 1991
- Men's tennis (2): 1986, 1990
- Wrestling (8): 1966, 1968, 1969, 1970, 1971, 1972, 1973, 1974

Below is one national championship that was not bestowed by the NCAA:

- Women's outdoor track and field – Division II (1): 1981 (AIAW)

=== Individual NCAA Division I titles ===
Cal Poly has had 12 Mustangs win NCAA individual championships at the Division I level.

NCAA individual championships
Order	School year	Athlete(s)	Sport	Source
1	1960–61	Tom Pagani	Men's outdoor track and field	
2	1968–69	Tom Kline	Wrestling	
3	1969–70	Mohinder Gill	Men's outdoor track and field	
4	1970–71	Reynaldo Brown	Men's outdoor track and field	
5	1970–71	Mohinder Gill	Men's indoor track and field	
6	1970–71	Mohinder Gill	Men's outdoor track and field	
7	1972–73	Reynaldo Brown	Men's outdoor track and field	
8	1975–76	Mark DiGirolamo	Wrestling	
9	1981–82	Karin Smith	Women's outdoor track and field	
10	1997–98	Bianca Maran	Women's outdoor track and field	
11	1998–99	Paula Serrano	Women's outdoor track and field	
12	2004–05	Sharon Day	Women's outdoor track and field	

At the NCAA Division II level, Cal Poly garnered 120 individual championships.

== Athletic facilities ==
- Anderson Aquatic Center

The Anderson Aquatic Center is a swimming and diving venue in San Luis Obispo, California. It is home to the Cal Poly Mustangs men's and women's swimming and diving team of the NCAA Division I in the Big West Conference. A new $100,000 scoreboard was added in October 2014, with dual-ability to function as an HD video device.

- Baggett Stadium

Robin Baggett Stadium is a baseball venue in San Luis Obispo, California. It is home to the Cal Poly Mustangs baseball team of the NCAA Division I in the Big West Conference. The stadium has a capacity of 1,734.

- Doerr Family Field

Doerr Family Field is the practice facility for football and soccer. Officially dedicated on February 2, 2018, the $4.8 million facility included a 140-yard synthetic-turf practice field allowing room for football sled work, along with goalposts, lights, a flagpole, a scoreboard and a pair of filming towers. The Cal Poly Corporation, Cal Poly Housing and Associated Students, Inc., collaborated on the project.

- Janssen Field

Bob Janssen Field is the home field for the Cal Poly Mustangs softball team. The venue has a capacity of 800. The softball program debuted a new hitting facility, breaking ground in November 2017, measuring 98 feet by 42 feet (20 feet high), with a dedication taking place May 5, 2018. The $400,000 project yielded two hitting bays on synthetic turf, with retractable netting systems allowing coaches and players to reconfigure to specific needs, a bullpen with three individual pitching rubbers, and a storage shed. In February 2019, a new Daktronics videoboard (25 feet wide by 14.5 feet tall) was added to the field.

- Miller and Capriotti Athletics Complex

The Miller and Capriotti Athletics Complex is the home track and field venue for the men's and women's Cal Poly Mustangs track and field teams. Inaugurated on March 24, 2018, the $1.6 million project in association with Cal Poly Corporation, Associated Students, Inc. and Cal Poly Housing was part of the reshaping of the southeast corner of campus from Longview Lane to Grand Avenue adjacent to a new 435,000-square-foot student housing site. Beynon Sports installed a new track surface and a newly renovated field was put into place inside the re-balanced infield oval, with drought-tolerant Bandera Bermuda grass.

- Mott Athletics Center

The Robert A. Mott Athletics Center is a 3,032-seat multi-purpose arena. It is home to the Cal Poly Mustangs men's and women's basketball teams, women's volleyball team and men's collegiate wrestling team.

- Mustang Beach Volleyball Complex

The Mustang Beach Volleyball Complex is the home venue for the Cal Poly women's beach volleyball team. In 2019, Cal Poly — which had hosted its home contests on nearby Pismo State Beach — proposed plans to construct five new on-campus beach volleyball courts, implementing an NCAA-regulation facility aspired to be one of the most elaborate in the country, including a videoboard. The project successfully broke ground in July 2019, with completion in November 2019.

- Mustang Tennis Complex

The Mustang Tennis Complex is the home tennis venue for the men's and women's Cal Poly Mustangs tennis teams. A new scoreboard was added to the seven-court complex in October 2013, part of a $250,000 project also including resurfacing of the courts along with the implementation of windscreens surrounding the facility. The site was dedicated in association with Tennis Connect SLO on October 5, 2013.

- Mustang Memorial Field Presented by Dignity Health French Hospital Medical Center

Mustang Memorial Field Presented by Dignity Health French Hospital Medical Center is an 11,075-seat multi-purpose stadium in San Luis Obispo, California. It is home to the Cal Poly Mustangs football team of the Big Sky Conference in the Football Championship Subdivision (FCS) and the Cal Poly Mustangs men's soccer and women's soccer teams. The stadium, originally opened in 1935, received a massive renovation in November 2006.

== Rivalries ==
=== The Battle for the Golden Horseshoe ===
Cal Poly's football rivalry with UC Davis, a fellow member of the Big Sky Conference, is played for the Golden Horseshoe.

=== The Blue-Green Rivalry ===
The main rival of the Cal Poly Mustangs are the UC Santa Barbara Gauchos who compete together in the Blue–Green Rivalry. The Blue-Green Rivalry, which started in November 1921 with a football game, was formalized in 2009. This new format calculates earned points between Cal Poly and UCSB to determine a winner based on their teams' competitive results against each other. Additionally, collegesoccernews.com ranked UC Santa Barbara vs. Cal Poly as the Greatest Rivalry in College Soccer.

=== Fresno State ===
From 1956 to 1975, Cal Poly and Fresno State traded the Victory Bell trophy, which was donated to Cal Poly in 1952. The trophy, which weighed about 200 pounds, was ultimately retired due to repeated theft. The two programs didn't play each other from 1986 through 2009, but brought back matchups in 2010, 2013, 2021 and 2022. In the 46-game all-time series, Fresno State leads 34–10–2.

== Alumni ==
- Ramses Barden, New York Giants wide receiver
- Bobby Beathard, NFL GM/Pro Football Hall of Fame inductee
- Reynaldo Brown, Olympic Track and Field high jumper
- Stephanie Brown Trafton, 2008 Olympic gold medalist discus thrower
- Kaaron Conwright, USATF sprinter (100-meter dash/200m dash)
- Kevin Correia, MLB pitcher and 2011 All-Star
- Jonathan Dally, Professional football quarterback
- Gary Davis, NFL running back
- Sharon Day-Monroe, Two-time U.S. Olympic track & field heptathlete
- Jimmy Deiparine, Philippines record-setting swimmer
- Nick Dzubnar, Los Angeles Chargers linebacker
- Mohinder Gill, NCAA triple jump champion and Olympic triple jumper (India)
- Victor Glover, NASA astronaut
- Chris Gocong, Philadelphia Eagles/Cleveland Browns linebacker
- Mitch Haniger, Seattle Mariners All-Star
- Sharon Hanson, Olympic track and field heptathlete
- Sierra Hyland, Olympic softball pitcher
- Asa Jackson, San Francisco 49ers cornerback
- Damone Johnson, Los Angeles Rams tight end
- Mel Kaufman, NFL linebacker/Washington Redskins Super Bowl champion
- Mike Krukow, MLB pitcher/1986 All-Star/San Francisco Giants broadcaster
- Brooks Lee, 2022 Minnesota Twins 8th overall (first round) draft choice
- Gene Lenz, Olympic swimmer
- Chuck Liddell, former UFC champion/MMA Hall of Famer
- John Madden, Oakland Raiders Super Bowl-winning coach/NFL commentator/Pro Football Hall of Famer
- Chad Mendes, 2008 NCAA second-place wrestler/UFC member
- Steve Miller, Nike director of global sports marketing
- Dana Nafziger, Tampa Bay Buccaneers linebacker
- Bud Norris, MLB pitcher
- Borislav Novachkov, Olympic wrestler
- David Nwaba, NBA guard
- Gina Oceguera, Mexico World Cup soccer player/WUSA pro
- John Orton, California Angels first-round draft pick
- Joe Prunty, NBA coach
- Carmelo Rios, Olympic track and field athlete (Puerto Rico)
- Loren Roberts, pro golfer
- Karin Smith, Olympic javelin thrower
- Ozzie Smith, St. Louis Cardinals shortstop/MLB Hall of Famer
- Alex G. Spanos, San Diego Chargers owner
- Chris Thomas, San Francisco 49ers wide receiver
- Ted Tollner, College football coach
- Cecil Turner, Chicago Bears Pro Bowl kick returner
- Drake U'u, Sacramento Kings assistant GM
- Evan Wick, wrestler

== Broadcast information ==
Cal Poly's ESPN Radio affiliate is ESPN 1280 AM The Ticket (KXTK). The station has added 101.7 FM carrying Mustangs broadcasts, with greater reach throughout San Luis Obispo County. In addition, Chris Sylvester hosts the Mustang Insider podcast with Learfield. As of 2021, Big West-telecast events involving Cal Poly switched to ESPN+, while Big Sky-streamed football games featuring the Mustangs also swung to the network approximate to the same time.

== Discontinued programs ==
=== Swimming and diving ===
On March 7, 2025, Cal Poly announced it was cutting both men's and women's swimming and diving effective immediately due to budget concerns, associated in part with the impact of House v. NCAA.

==== International record-holders ====
- Jimmy Deiparine went on to set the Filipino national record in the 100-meter breaststroke: 1:02.08 in 2016. In 2017, Deiparine won the silver medal for the 100m breast at the Southeast Asian Games in Kuala Lumpur. Also in 2017, Deiparine swam at the FINA World Championships in Budapest, breaking his own 50m breast Philippine national record, taking 36th place out of 81 swimmers, via 28.13 seconds.

==== Olympians ====
- Gene Lenz competed in the 1960 Olympics, earning seventh place in the 400m freestyle final in Rome, with a time of 4:26.8.
- Former Mustang distance swimmer Taylor Spivey took 10th place in the individual women's triathlon at the 2024 Paris Games, compiling a time of 1:57:11, before winning a silver medal in the mixed relay (combining with her teammates for a time of 1:25.40).

=== Women's gymnastics ===
Cal Poly suspended its intercollegiate gymnastics team during the fall of 1990.

== Club teams (non-NCAA) ==
=== Rugby ===
The Mustangs play college rugby in the California conference of Division 1-A. The Mustangs are often ranked in the Top 25 nationwide, and their rugby sevens team has been ranked as high as 7th. The Mustangs finished 8th in the nation at the 2011 USA Rugby Sevens Collegiate National Championships, and 12th at the 2012 competition.

=== National club team championships ===
- Co-ed cycling (1): 1992 (USA Cycling)
- Men's rodeo (3): 1970, 1971, 1973 (NIRA)
- Women's rodeo (1): 1989 (NIRA)
- Co-ed Triathlon (1): 1995 (USA Triathlon)
- Stunt (1): 2023 (Stunt)
