= Edward C. Allworth Veterans' Home =

- Location within Oregon

Geography
- Location: Oregon, United States
- Coordinates: 44.5522541°N 122.9154191°W

Organization
- Type: Skilled nursing facility

Services
- Beds: 154

History
- Opened: 2014

Links
- Lists: Hospitals in Oregon

Edward C. Allworth Veterans' Home is a skilled nursing facility on 12 acres in Lebanon, Oregon, with spaces for 154 American veterans. It offers skilled nursing services, rehabilitation services and long-term care, as well as care for dementia and Alzheimer's patients.

== Design ==
In April 2010 Oregon Department of Veterans' Affairs selected Lebanon as the location of the second Veterans' home in Oregon, on the campus of Samaritan Lebanon Community Hospital (a 25-bed Critical Access Hospital), and next to WesternU's osteopathic medicine school, and Linn–Benton Community College's Lebanon extension. Groundbreaking took place in September 2012 on the $40 million facility. Named for Maj. Edward Allworth, who was awarded a Medal of Honor for his World War I service, it opened in 2014.

The facility was designed by CB Two Architects, in collaboration with NBBJ Architecture, using the "small-house" model and design guide of the Department of Veterans Affairs Community Living Centers. The design features "clusters of small residential buildings connected by a spine of shared program space", intended to foster independence and personal connections. The building is divided into eleven housing units with 14 residents each. John Osborn, project manager, said, "The small house model alters the facility's size, the interior design, staffing patterns, and methods of delivering skilled professional care and services." According to Jeremy Woodall, admissions officer, the design gives residents "more one-on-one time with medical staff and creates an intimate, home-like environment."

Three paintings by April Waters, including a portrait of Major Allworth, were installed in 2017. The portrait was commissioned by Oregon Percent for Art and the Oregon Department of Veterans' Affairs.

== History ==
The new facility reached capacity at 154 residents in November 2016, the second anniversary of its opening, a year ahead of projections for full occupancy. In 2016, the average resident age was 85, with an average length of stay being 50 days.

=== Coronavirus outbreak ===
A COVID-19 outbreak occurred at the home. By March 16, the virus was confirmed in 13 residents (most over age 70) and one healthcare worker. With 151 residents and 225 workers, the county health director said, "I can't stop it. I can't stop the virus. I can't make test kits appear", but there was some optimism that the spread would be slow since the retirement home is divided into eleven housing units. On March 16, Providence Health Systems, Kaiser Permanente, Legacy Health, and Oregon Health & Science University formed a coalition to set up a regional health system in the state in order to address anticipated need for capacity and coordination to address the outbreak.
