= Jamba Juice =

American beverage chain

Jamba

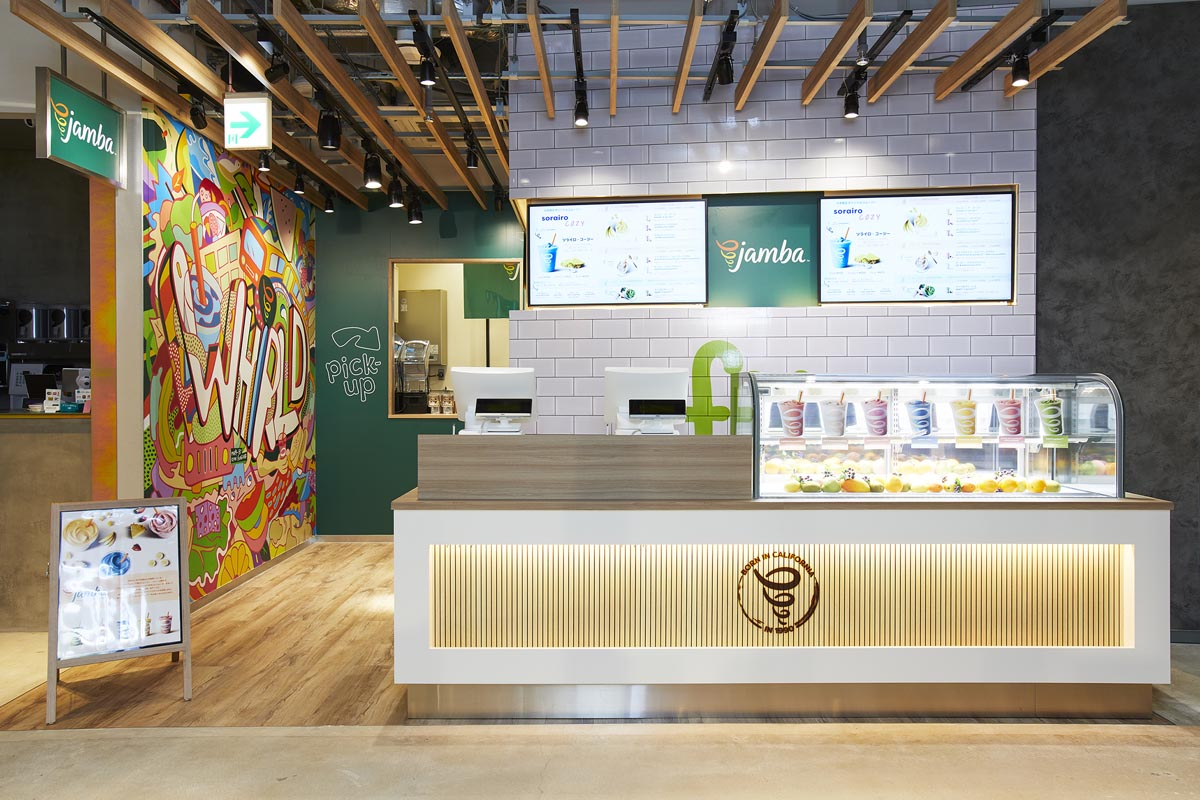
- A Jamba store in Tokyo, Japan
- Type: Subsidiary
- Founded: San Luis Obispo, California, U.S. (1990; 36 years ago)
- Founder: Kirk Perron
- Headquarters: Atlanta, Georgia, United States
- Number of locations: 864 (2019)
- Key people: Nathan Louer (Chief Brand Officer)
- Parent: GoTo Foods
- Website: www.jamba.com

Jamba, formerly known as Jamba Juice, is an American quick-service restaurant and juice bar chain that sells blended fruit and vegetable juices, smoothies, and other food products. The first Jamba location, originally named Juice Club, opened in 1990 in San Luis Obispo, California. Jamba is owned by GoTo Foods, an affiliate of private equity firm Roark Capital Group, which completed its acquisition in 2019. The company has 850 locations operating in 38 states in the United States, and also has locations in Australia, Japan, the Philippines, Taiwan, South Korea, Thailand, Indonesia, and Hong Kong.

== History ==
Jamba Juice was opened by Kirk Perron at California Polytechnic State University, San Luis Obispo. Perron, who worked as a supermarket manager and was also an avid cyclist and healthy-lifestyle advocate, opened the restaurant because he was dissatisfied with the quality of post-workout snacks, saying, “The marketplace was mostly filled with fat.” The first restaurant, named Juice Club, opened on March 31, 1990, in San Luis Obispo, California. It was incorporated in 1990 as Juice Club, Inc. in San Luis Obispo. By 1991, Juice Club had expanded to 19 locations by franchising, but Perron later abandoned the franchise model in favor of company-owned stores. In 1995, the chain was renamed Jamba Juice, drawing from a West African word for “celebration”. Jamba Juice acquired Zuka Juice, a rival juice bar, on March 24, 1999.

On March 13, 2006, Jamba Juice was purchased by Services Acquisition Corp. International for $265 million. A special-purpose acquisition company that was headed by Steven Berrard, the former CEO of Blockbuster Inc. Upon completion of the transaction, the publicly traded Services Acquisition changed its name to Jamba, Inc.

In June 2006, Jamba, Inc. announced it had completed a $35 million convertible preferred stock transaction. The funding was led by a $19.55 million investment by Mistral Equity Partners, a private equity fund focused on consumer products and services companies. The remaining $15.45 million investment was made by a company controlled by the Serruya Family, a successful entrepreneurial Canadian-based family who founded the Yogen Früz frozen yogurt and smoothie chain.

A Jamba Juice store located at Universal CityWalk Hollywood

In June 2009, Jamba began to shift its focus from smoothies and began selling wraps, sandwiches, and flatbreads.

In July 2009, Jamba Juice was criticized for running an advertising campaign, which was described as a “ripoff” of the work of cartoonist David Rees. The ad campaign looked similar to Rees' "Get Your War On" series. Rees was informed of the Jamba Juice ads by a fan who sent in a letter. Rees stated that “Jamba Juice bit my style, with no credit, and it's kind of disrespectful.”

In May 2016, Jamba Juice announced the move of its corporate headquarters from Emeryville, California to Frisco, Texas, indicating the high costs of living and conducting business in the San Francisco Bay Area. In 2019, Jamba Juice was acquired by Atlanta-based Focus Brands, and the same year the chain changed its name to Jamba to reflect its expanded menu and negative health connotations around the word “juice”.

On June 20, 2020, founder Kirk Perron died from cardiac arrest in Palm Springs, California, at the age of 56. On August 4, 2020, Jamba opened a location in Tokyo, its first in Japan.

== Animal welfare ==
GoTo Foods (formerly known as FOCUS Brands), the parent company of Jamba Juice, has announced a commitment to source only cage-free eggs for all menu items by 2026. The company has stated that it will phase out the use of battery cages in the United States and Canada by 2026, with a global transition slated for 2028.

== Product expansion ==
In December 2007, it was announced that Jamba would partner with Nestlé to lend its name to a line of healthy, pre-prepared beverages under the Jamba brand. On December 19, 2008, a press release from Nestle USA and Jamba Juice announced the suspension of Jamba pre-prepared products due to "...challenges ... with manufacturing on a consistent basis, resulting in inventory and out-of-stock issues."

In 2014, Jamba Juice expanded its Fresh Juice menu, and began making juice blends to order with fresh ingredients such as kale, beets and ginger.

== Innovation Bar ==
Jamba Juice Innovation Bar

General information
- Location: Old Pasadena, Pasadena, California, US, 60 E Colorado Blvd, Pasadena, CA 91105
- Coordinates: 34°8′44.232″N 118°8′56.8248″W
- Construction started: September 2015
- Opened: July 14, 2016
- Closed: January 2017
- Owner: Jamba, Inc.

Design and construction
- Architect: Barbara Bestor
- Architecture firm: Bestor Architecture

Website
- Innovation Bar

In July 2016, Jamba opened a concept store, the Jamba Juice Innovation Bar, Located in Old Pasadena. The Innovation Bar replaced their nineteenth store with one that was roughly double the size of a typical Jamba Juice store. Along with smoothies, the location also sold many other foods, including quinoa bowls, artisan hummus toast with vegetables, homemade potato chips, and various vegan foods. It was also the first location with a larger Wi-Fi dining area. Matt Kafka, the senior director of operations at Jamba, described it as a "cool and hip place in Southern California". The store was also adorned with mirrored wall art and photographs of various fruits, and a set of television screens that showed various video greetings. On January 3, 2017, the Innovation Bar shut down and became a standard Jamba location.

== See also ==
- Booster Juice
- Milkshake
- Orange Julius
- Robeks
- Smoothie
- Talbott Teas
