= Edward Allworth =

United States Army Medal of Honor recipient

Edward Christopher Allworth
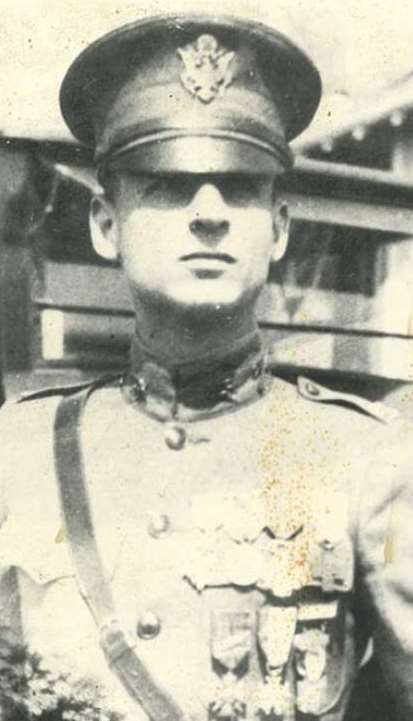
- Captain Edward C. Allworth
- Born: July 6, 1895; Battle Ground, Washington, U.S.
- Died: June 24, 1966 (aged 70); Portland, Oregon, U.S.
- Burial place: Crystal Lake Cemetery; Corvallis, Oregon
- Military career
- Allegiance: United States
- Branch: United States Army
- Service years: 1917–1922
- Rank: Major
- Units: 60th Infantry Regiment, 5th Division
- Conflicts: World War I
- Awards: Medal of Honor; Purple Heart

Edward Christopher Allworth (July 6, 1895 – June 24, 1966) was an American officer in the United States Army during World War I.

== Biography ==
Allworth was born in Battle Ground, Washington, Allworth graduated from Oregon State University in 1916. He enlisted at Corvallis, Oregon in 1917 and joined the 60th Infantry Regiment of the 5th Division. On November 5, 1918, mere days from the armistice, Allworth and his company crossed the Meuse River via a canal bridge near the French village of Clery-le-Petit. When shellfire destroyed the bridge and separated the company into two halves, Allworth swam across with some of his men while under fire from the enemy. Leading a subsequent charge towards the enemy lines, he forced them back one kilometre, taking 100 prisoners and thus capturing the bridgehead.

For this action, Allworth received the Medal of Honor in 1919. In 1925, Allworth rejoined the Oregon State University faculty as secretary of the Alumni Association, secretary of the Memorial Union Board of Governors, and manager of the Memorial Union. He published a set of memoirs titled Edward C. Allworth Papers, 1954-1963 before he retired in 1963. He died in Portland, Oregon on June 24, 1966.

== Medal of Honor citation ==
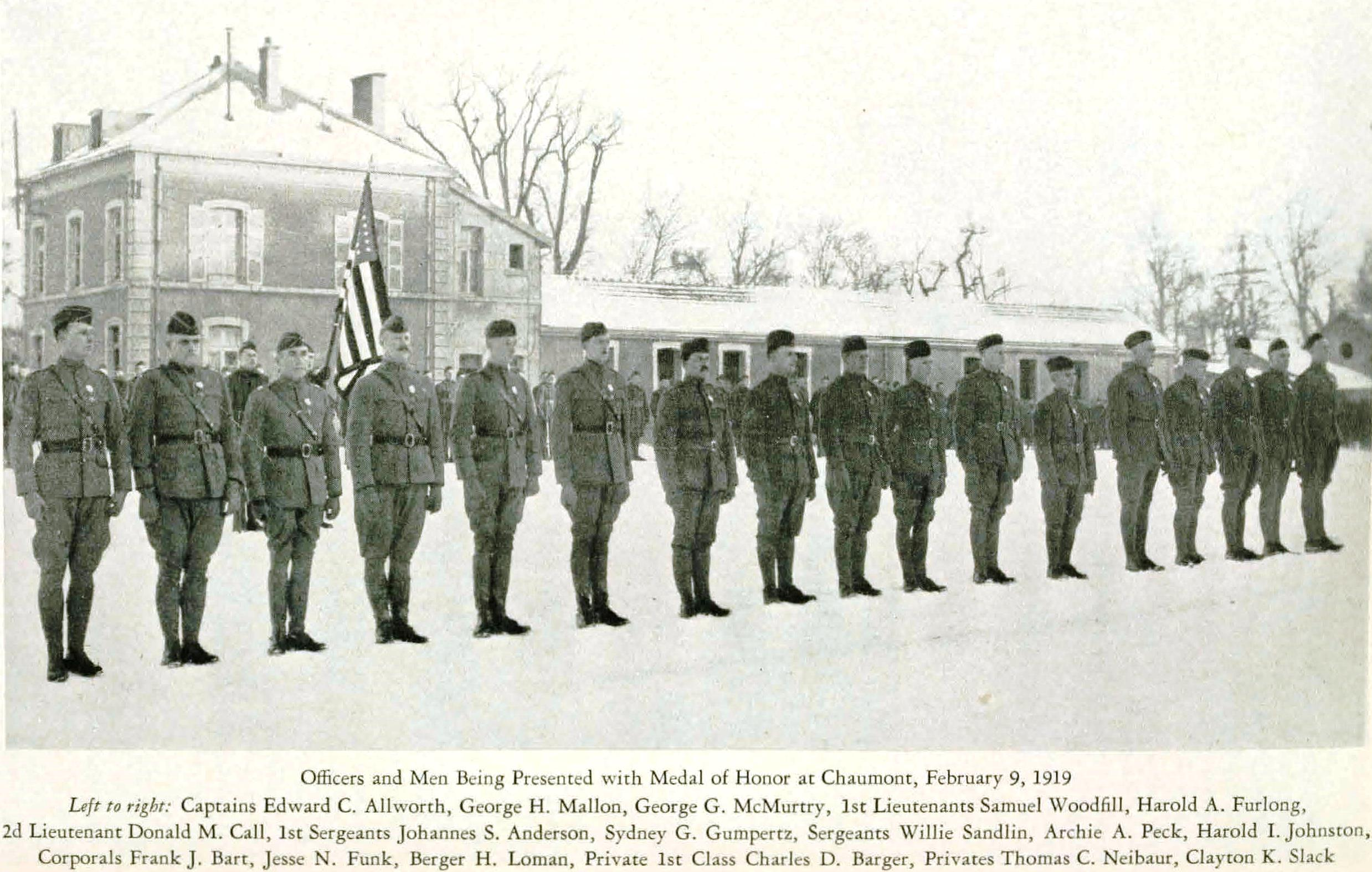
Medal of Honor Presentation Ceremony - February 9, 1919, at Chaumont, France. General John J. Pershing presided.

- Rank and organization: Captain, U.S. Army, 60th Infantry, 5th Division.
- Place and date: At Clery-le-Petit, France, November 5, 1918.
- Entered service at: Corvallis, Oregon
- Born: July 6, 1895, Crawford, Washington
- General Orders: War Department, General Orders No. 16 ( January 22, 1919).

Citation:

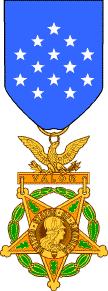

While his company was crossing the Meuse River and canal at a bridgehead opposite Clery-le-Petit, the bridge over the canal was destroyed by shell fire and Capt. Allworth's command became separated, part of it being on the east bank of the canal and the remainder on the west bank. Seeing his advance units making slow headway up the steep slope ahead, this officer mounted the canal bank and called for his men to follow. Plunging in he swam across the canal under fire from the enemy, followed by his men. Inspiring his men by his example of gallantry, he led them up the slope, joining his hard-pressed platoons in front. By his personal leadership he forced the enemy back for more than a kilometer, overcoming machinegun nests and capturing 100 prisoners, whose number exceeded that of the men in his command. The exceptional courage and leadership displayed by Capt. Allworth made possible the re-establishment of a bridgehead over the canal and the successful advance of other troops.

== Military awards and decorations ==
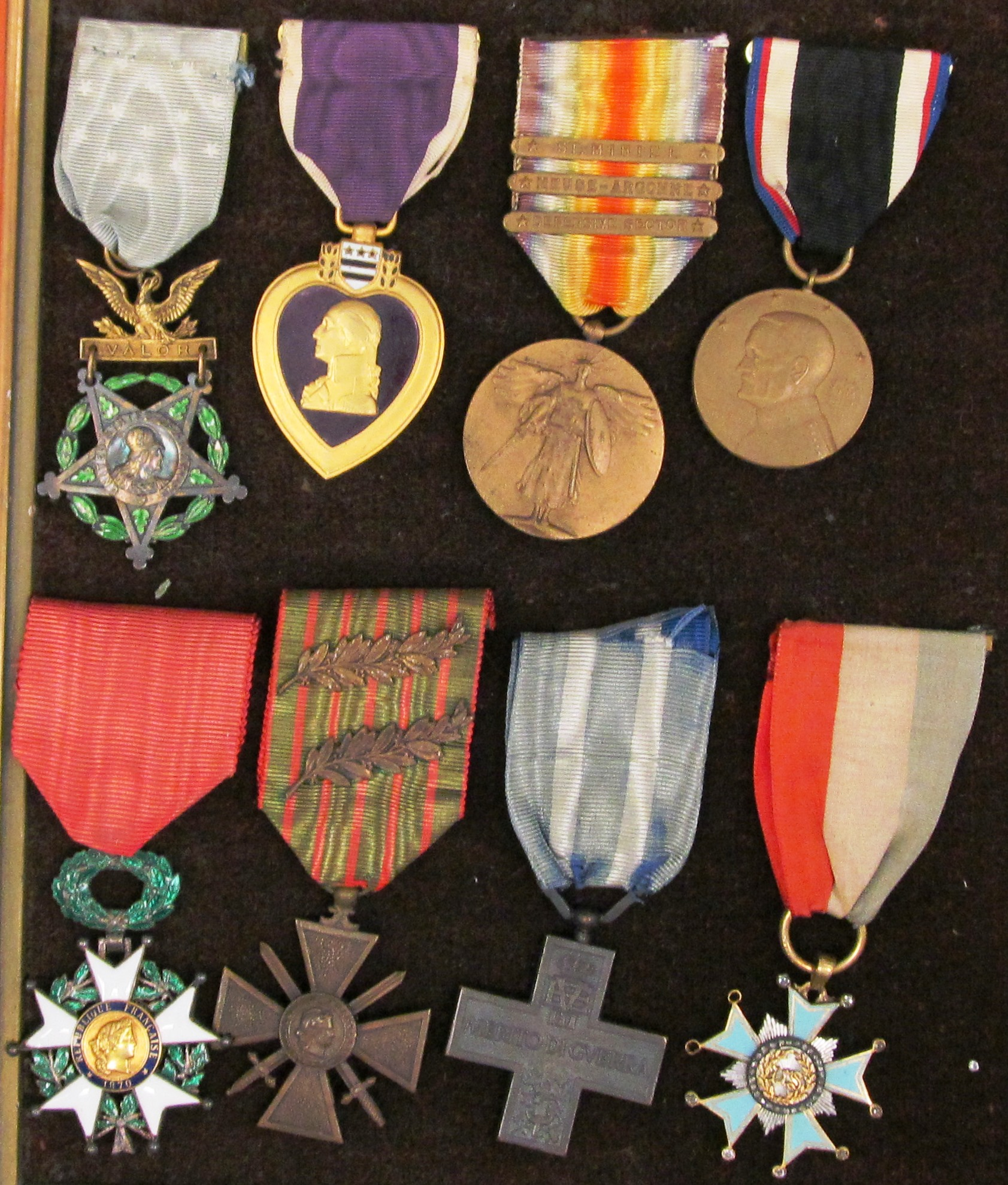
Original decorations of WWI Medal of Honor recipient Major Edward C. Allworth in the collection of the United States Army Heritage and Education Center, Carlisle Barracks, Pennsylvania. First row: Medal of Honor; Purple Heart; World War I Victory Medal with St. Mihiel, Meuse-Argonne and Defensive Sector battle clasps; Army of Occupation of Germany Medal. Second row: French Ordre national de la Légion d'honneur in the degree of Knight; French Croix de guerre 1914-1918 with two bronze palms; Italian Croce al Merito di Guerra and Levi Washington State Diamond Commemorative Medal.

Allworth's military decorations and awards include:

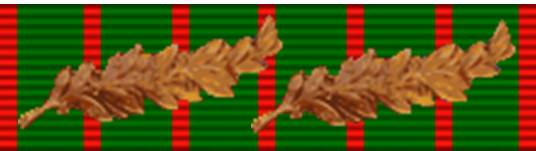

1st row	Medal of Honor		
2nd row	Purple Heart	World War I Victory Medal w/three bronze service stars to denote credit for the St. Mihiel, Meuse-Argonne and Defensive Sector battle clasps.	Army of Occupation of Germany Medal
3rd row	Ordre national de la Légion d'honneur degree of Knight (French Republic)	Croix de guerre 1914–1918 w/ two bronze palms (French Republic)	Croce al Merito di Guerra (Italy)

In addition, state veterans home in Lebanon, Oregon, the Edward C. Allworth Veterans' Home, is named after him.

== See also ==
- List of Medal of Honor recipients
- List of Medal of Honor recipients for World War I
- Edward A. Allworth (son)
