= April Waters =

American landscape painter

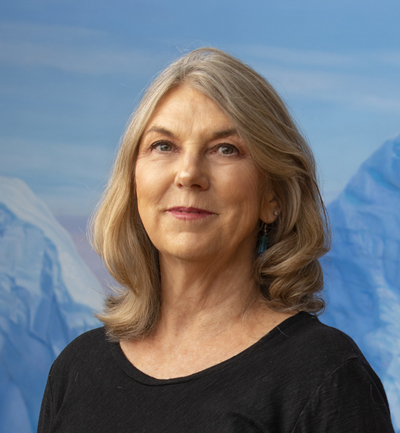
April Waters standing in front of one of her paintings from Water-Ice-Sky-Antarctica. Image by Kelly James Photography.

April Waters (born 1954, Santa Monica, California) is an American Artist who paints American and polar landscapes. She is best known for water themed landscape paintings and large-scale portraits of women environmental leaders. Her work has been exhibited at museums, universities, galleries and at forums on water and climate issues with scientists and government officials

== Early life and education ==
Waters earned a BFA at the University of Colorado, Boulder. She also studied at the Art Center School of Design, Los Angeles; at UCLA; and California State University, Fullerton. She is married to architect Nathan Good.

== Career ==
April Waters' works are held in public and private collections, such as Oregon State University, Salem Hospital, Edward C. Allworth Veterans' Home, Mount Angel Abbey, Hallie Ford Museum of Art, Slocum Orthopedic Center and Riverbend Peace Health Hospital in Springfield, Oregon, as well as internationally. Waters' work was exhibited at the U.S. Embassy in Bishkek, Kyrgyzstan from 2012-2015 through the United States Arts in Embassies Program.

Waters was a National Park Artist in Residence for the Crater Lake Centennial Celebration and Exhibition at the Schneider Museum of Art in Ashland, Oregon. She was also an Artist in Residence in July 2022 at the Ilulissat Art Museum in Ilulissat, Greenland.

Waters has multiple works in Oregon's Percent for Art Collection.

== Major works ==
=== Water-Ice-Sky-Antarctica, 2018-2023 ===
In 2018, Waters was a grantee of the National Science Foundation for "deployment to Palmer Station, Antarctica... [for] the opportunity to observe, sketch, and produce paintings of the ocean, sea ice, icebergs, and Marr Glacier. The focus on water was to bring a fresh and unique perspective to observe and express the Antarctic wilderness. Her goal [was] to communicate the beauty as well as the vulnerability of Antarctica's ecosystem and help communicate the region's sense of wonder to the public. Her unique perspective provides a distinctive addition to the Antarctic Artists and Writers portfolio."

Prior to her trip to Antarctica, Bob Hicks of Oregon ArtsWatch wrote:

In 2018, Oregon artist April Waters — known for her works that focus on water and contemporary women leaders — turned her attention to Antarctica. As a grantee of the National Science Foundation Antarctic Artists and Writers Program, Waters traveled to Palmer Station to observe, study, photograph, and sketch the ocean, icebergs, and Marr Glacier. After witnessing firsthand, the beauty and harsh realities of a landscape facing monumental change, coupled with profound implications for the entire globe, Waters returned to her studio to transform her sketches, photographs and experiences into paintings of the earth’s southernmost continent.

— Bob Hicks, Antarctic Journey: Waters on Ice

"As Antarctica is undergoing dramatic changes in response to climate change," marine biologist Dr. Kim Bernard of Oregon State University says, "I hope that those who experience the paintings that April Waters has created from her Antarctic expedition feel awed and inspired to protect this place.

In 2019, Waters was recognized with a United States of America, Antarctica Service Medal.

Articles about Waters' trip to Antarctica, about the work, and about the exhibit were also featured in The Salem Reporter and in Press Play Salem.

The work resulted in several exhibitions. From May 7 – August 13, 2022, the work was exhibited at the Hallie Ford Museum of Art in Salem, Oregon. From March 15 – April 28, 2023, the work was exhibited at the Giustina Gallery at Oregon State University. From October 9, 2023 to February 29, 2024 portions of the work are on display at the National Center for Atmospheric Research in Boulder, Colorado.

=== Willamette River series (ongoing) ===
Her work on rivers, creeks, estuaries, and oceans, has led to regional and national acclaim, exhibitions and collaborations with scientists and universities. The American Water Resources Association described her process, "When she is inspired by a place, she goes there often, in different seasons and on different times of the day. In most cases, she sketches or paints on site. Equipped with sketches and her experiences, she then paints in her studio using oil on canvas or oil on panel."

The Statesman Journal wrote of her work, "A river is a natural subject for Waters. Many of her paintings are focused on area rivers, creeks, estuaries, and coastlines and exhibited in hospitals, clinics, and other health-related facilities."

Bob Hicks of Oregon Arts Watch wrote, "What might seem at first glance simply a well-rendered landscape is certainly that, but also more: It is an examination of waterways, their shifting patterns, their effect on humans and the way we live our lives, the precarious ecological balances of a world in climate upheaval. There is something, not clinical, but deeply observational about her interpretations of the natural world and the way things work."

=== Landscape (ongoing) ===
Water, with its qualities of reflection, transparency, movement and life generation, has been the focus of her work. The Willamette River Series paintings began as an aerial exploration of the beautiful landscape of the region, and evolved into studies of the movement of the river, flooding, and its impact on the geography of the land through which it flows.

In a 2014 interview in Willamette Valley Life Magazine, Waters said, "I go to my sources of inspiration and paint from life. It is invigorating for me to paint by the side of a creek or river. It awakens all the senses."

=== Sheroes (ongoing) ===
Her series "Sheroes" portrays women who advocate for humanitarian and environmental justice by taking stands to protect people and resources. They have taken a stand to protect people and/or resources. Most of the women have made contributions to the equitable sharing and protection of clean water. An exhibition at the Pacific Northwest College of Art consisted of seven large-scale portraits of larger-than-life women inclucde Vandana Shiva, Wangari Maathai, Malalai Joya, Helen Caldicott, Amy Goodman, Cindy Sheehan, and Maude Barlow. Since then, a portrait of Dr. Sylvia Earle has been added to the series.

While Waters' major works over the last thirty years have focused on the beauty and power of oceans, rivers and streams, she learned about the social and environmental threats to water as a primary element of life and to the efforts of the women featured in the portraits. Each woman has taken a unique stand to protect natural resources and the people dependent on them. The oil-on-canvas paintings, each standing seven feet by five feet, envelop the viewer in the clear gaze of the woman depicted, pulling the viewer into her story.

Many of the portraits featured in this show were part of a 2010 exhibit at the Willamette University Hallie Ford Museum. Museum director John Olbrantz noted,"wonderful portraits of contemporary women leaders... attracted thousands of visitors."

== Awards ==
- 2011 Honorarium Award from the Oregon Artist Series. Salem Conference Center Invitational, Salem, OR. July 2010 - July 2011, and is in the collection of the Hallie Ford Museum of Art in Salem, OR.
- 2007 "All Oregon Call for Artists Competition" by the Salem Art Association, for a 5x20-foot painting now in the collection of HOPE Orthopedic Group Salem, OR.
- 2001 Art About Agriculture, Oregon State University Purchase Award, and is in the collection of Oregon State University.
