= Robeks =

Smoothie franchise in the US

Robeks Fresh Juices & Smoothies
- Type: Private
- Founded: 1996; 30 years ago
- Headquarters: Los Angeles, California,
- Number of locations: 100+
- Website: robeks.com

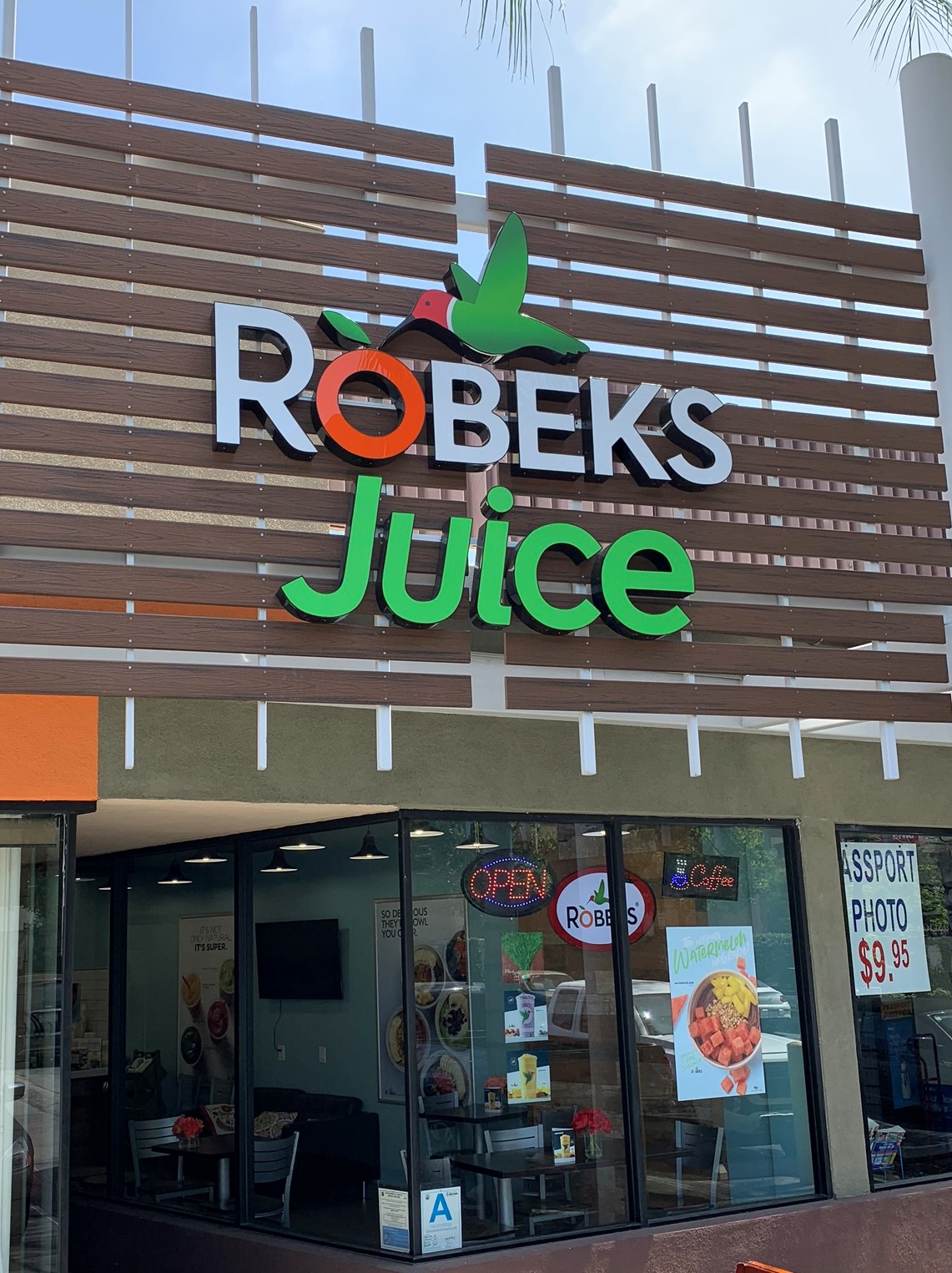
Robeks store on Balboa Blvd., Encino, CA - 2019 Updated

Robeks is a smoothie franchise chain headquartered in Los Angeles, California. The company was founded in 1996 by David Robertson, a former investment banker. As of July 2024, the company has over 100 franchise locations.

== Background ==
Peter Bickford was a Wall Street banker and his wife Katrina ran a landscape design business. They were introduced to Robeks by Kela Alstrup, a franchise broker. The Bickfords "were hooked by the idea of providing healthy food in a colorful, high energy setting." The Bickfords opened the first Robeks franchise in New England.

In 2017, Robeks introduced a new menu. In February 2018, Robeks launched their new Online Ordering program allowing customers to place orders from their desktop or mobile devices. The cornerstone of the program is a new mobile app that is now available to the public. In the summer of 2018, Robeks introduced three floral infused lemonades in anticipation of the summer heat: Rose, Hibiscus, and Lavender.
