= Nathan L. Good =

American architect, sustainable building designer

- Born: 1954 (age 71–72)
- Education: California Polytechnic State University, San Luis Obispo
- Occupation: Architect
- Spouse: April Waters (m. 1980)
- Children: 3
- Awards: List
- Website: nathangoodarchitects.com

Nathan L. Good (born 1954) is an American architect best known for sustainable, green building designs. He was one of the first individuals that the U.S. Green Building Council designated as a LEED accredited professional. He is the founding principal of Nathan Good Architects PC, in Salem, Oregon, and a fellow of the American Institute of Architects.

== Early life and education ==
Nathan Good learned principles of green building in childhood. He has said,"I worked for 10 summers on the family farm in Oklahoma... I learned that you don't eat your seed corn, you salvage everything to be re-used some other time and you repair all of your equipment. I have a city boy in me who loves architecture and a farmer in me who understands self-sufficiency and resiliency."

He attended the University of Copenhagen's Denmark International Studies in Architecture in 1976–1977, prior to earning a Bachelor of Science Degree (1978) and a Master's Degree in Architecture (1991), both from California Polytechnic State University, San Luis Obispo.

Good is married to April Waters. They have a son, Aaron.

== Career ==
Green building is about common sense... It's about planning, understanding the site, the climate, the client's needs and the long-term ramifications of our decisions.

— Nathan Good

Good is best known for his sustainable, green building designs that strive for a net-zero, carbon neutral footprint as well as his eco-charrette design process. For an "environmentally sensitive design", he has conducted a design charrette, teaching sessions with clients, contractors, subcontractors and suppliers, to explain his principles and standards of green building design, and to answer their questions and concerns.

Good designed the first fully FSC certified US single-family home. He was also the fifth individual in the United States to be designated a LEED accredited professional by the U.S. Green Building Council. He is an NCARB registered architect, and an NCIDQ certified interior designer.

Good established Nathan Good Architects PC in 2005.

== Selected honors and awards ==
In 2015, Good was named a member of the College of Fellows of American Institute of Architects, in the category, "Advanced the science and art of planning and building by advancing the standards of architectural education, training and practice".

Naming Good their first "sustainability superhero" in 2019, Green Builder's Alan Naditz wrote of Good's ability to bring "sustainability to life, and making it part of every conversation. His portfolio of projects offers stunning examples of how environmental empathy and a responsible work can coexist."

Good and his firm have received regional, national and international design awards:

- 2006: Sunset magazine's "Western Home Awards"
- 2008: The Root Award: Home of the Year 2008 - Portland Spaces Magazine
- 2012: 25 Green Building Leaders in the Northwest - Sustainable Industries Journal
- 2012: Custom Green Home of the Year - National Association of Home Builders
- 2012: Green Home of the Year, Best Eco-Integration - GreenBuilder Magazine
- 2014: People's Choice Award - International Interior Design Association
- 2015: Green Service of the Year - Mid-Willamette Valley Green Awards
- 2015: Western Home Award - Sunset magazine
- 2016: Best Vineyard & Tasting Room Experience - Sunset Magazine Travel Awards
- 2017: Sustainable Design Award, 1st Place Residential Build Project - World Architecture's "Rethinking the Future"
- 2018: Architectural Design Winner (homes over 3,000 sq.ft.) - Oregon Home Magazine Structure + Style Awards
- 2018: DeMuro Award - Restore Oregon: Celebrating Preservation, Reuse, and Community Revitalization
- 2018: Luxury Custom Home of the Year - GreenBuilder Magazine
- 2019: Green Good Design Award - The Chicago Athenaeum Museum of Architecture and Design
- 2019: LEED for Homes Project Team Green Home Builder of the Year - Earth Advantage
