= Irene Chan =

American visual artist

- Born: 陳廷芬; 1965 (age 60–61); San Francisco, California, U.S.
- Education: California Polytechnic State University, San Luis Obispo, San Francisco Art Institute
- Occupation: Visual Artist, Professor

Irene Chan is an American visual artist known for her work in artist's books.

== Early life and education ==
Chan was born in Chinatown in San Francisco, California in the United States.

Chan graduated in 1989 from California Polytechnic State University, San Luis Obispo with a Bachelor of Architecture and a minor in English. She obtained her Master of Fine Arts in 1997 from the San Francisco Art Institute, where she received the Bronze Roller Award in Printmaking for Outstanding Artistic Achievement.

== Career ==
Inspired by Taoist philosophy, Chan's work explores "the impermanence of nature," "patterns and natural phenomena in the cosmic order, like growth and decay: things that are in the movement of evolving from or devolving toward nothingness." Chan makes books, and since 1995 she has owned the publishing house Ch'An Press. She has served as artist in residence at Women's Studio Workshop (WSW) in Rosendale, New York. During her residence at WSW, she produced Cé (1998), a collection of handmade paper and ink that depicts "nature's form, gestures, and movements as a written language."

Chan has illustrated and designed for the Electric Power Research Institute and the American Society of Heating, Refrigerating and Air-Conditioning Engineers. She serves as associate professor in the fine arts department at the University of Maryland, Baltimore County. She finds inspiration in Chinese philosophy and nature.

Chan has been awarded honors from the Minnesota Center for Book Arts, the National Endowment for the Arts, the Maryland State Arts Council, and others. She has exhibited her work at venues and organizations such as the Islington Arts and Media School, San Francisco Arts Commission, A.I.R. Gallery, the University of Delaware, and the Legion of Honor. Her work is held in the collection of the Archives of American Art, Columbia University, Indiana University, British Library, Tate Modern, Walker Art Center, and more.

Chan has been included in the Asian American Arts Centre's artasiamerica digital archive.

Chan is an Associate Professor of Print Media and affiliate faculty in Asian Studies at University of Maryland, Baltimore County in Baltimore, Maryland.

== Creative Works ==
- Asian American? project, 2007
- Barbie paper doll : a transformed wardrobe with textile mill history, 2007
- Freeways on the moon, 2011

== Collections ==
- The Claremont Colleges Library, Irvine, CA
- Indiana University - Purdue University Indianapolis, IN
- Macalester College, DeWitt Wallace Library, St. Paul, MN
- Mills College at Northeastern University, Oakland, CA
- Rhode Island School of Design Library, Providence, RI
- UC Davis, Shields Library, Davis, CA
- University of California, Irvine, Langson Library, Irvine, CA
- University of California, Los Angeles, Los Angeles, CA
- UC Santa Barbara, Santa Barbara, CA
- UC Santa Cruz, Santa Cruz, CA
- University of Denver, University Libraries, Denver, CO
- University of Nebraska Omaha, Dr C C & Mabel L Criss Library, Omaha, NE
- University of North Carolina at Greensboro, University Libraries, Greensboro, NC
- University of Utah, J. Willard Marriott Library, Salt Lake City, UT
