= Bill Nelson (bull rider) =

American bull rider

- Born: Bill Nelson Jr. 1944 (age 81–82); San Francisco, California, U.S.
- Occupation: Bull rider
- Spouse: Cindy Nelson (m. 1974)

Bill Nelson Jr. (born 1944) is an American former professional rodeo cowboy who specialized in bull riding and competed in the Rodeo Cowboys Association (RCA).

== Life and career ==
Nelson was born in San Francisco, California, the son of Bill Sr. and Irene Nelson. In 1967, he won the unofficial championship at the San Francisco Valley Rodeo. He attended California Polytechnic State University, San Luis Obispo, earning his degree in animal husbandry in 1972. During his college career, from 1970 to 1972, he also competed professionally in the Rodeo Cowboys Association (RCA) and competed at the National Finals Rodeo. He was named the RCA world champion bull rider in 1971.

In 1973, Nelson competed at the Golden State Rodeo in the Long Beach Arena in Long Beach, California, and in the same year, he was the only qualifier in bull riding at the National Western Stock Show in Denver, Colorado. In 1980, he competed at the Grand National Rodeo. Aside from competing in rodeo events, he mentored J.C. Trujillo, a bareback bronc rider.

In 2025, Nelson was inducted into the Bull Riding Hall of Fame.
