= Paula Huston =

American novelist

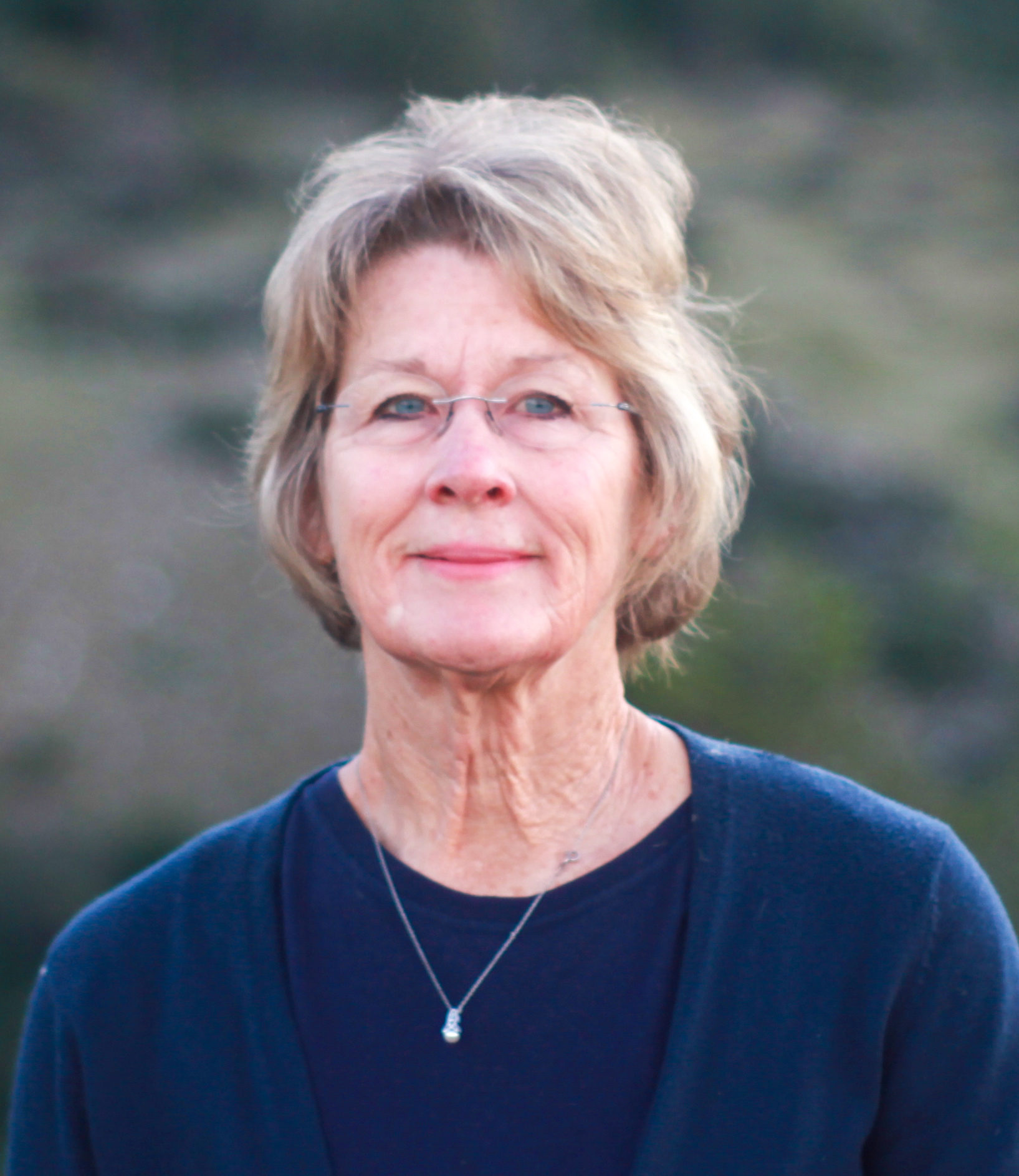
- Paula Huston
- Born: Paula Dahl; April 25, 1952 (age 74); Minneapolis, Minnesota
- Education: Cal Poly San Luis Obispo
- Occupation: Author
- Spouse: Michael Huston
- Writing career
- Period: 1983 - Present (First published novel: 1995)
- Genres: Nonfiction, Fiction
- Website: paulahuston.com

Paula Huston (born April 25, 1952) is an American novelist, short story writer, essayist, and creative nonfiction writer.

== Life ==
Paula Huston was born in Minneapolis, Minnesota, the eldest of five children of Lyle and Solveig Dahl, and grew up in Long Beach, California, where she attended Millikan High School. She married her first husband a year after graduation, and in 1973, they moved to San Luis Obispo, California, where she began writing and publishing short stories. Her daughter, Andrea, was born in 1977, and her son, John, arrived in 1978. Divorced in the early 1980s, she married Michael Huston in 1985, who had two daughters of his own.

She enrolled at Cal Poly San Luis Obispo in her mid-thirties, where she earned a bachelor's degree in English and a master's degree in British and American Literature, going on to teach in the Cal Poly English Department for the next twelve years.

In 1994, she was awarded a National Endowment of the Arts Fellowship in Creative Writing. Her first novel, Daughters of Song, was published in 1995. In 1999 she helped design and implement the California State University Consortium Master of Fine Arts in Creative Writing, in which she taught for the next three years. When the program ended in 2002, she took an early retirement from Cal Poly to become a full-time writer, speaker, and retreat leader. She served as a creative nonfiction mentor for the Seattle Pacific University MFA program from 2011-2016.

Raised Lutheran, she left the church when she was seventeen, but returned as a Catholic in 1994. In 1999, she became a Camaldolese Benedictine oblate, a lay member of New Camaldoli Hermitage's community of monks in Big Sur, California. She served as co-director of New Camaldoli’s oblate formation program from 2015-2022, and as president of the Chrysostom Society, a national organization of literary Christian writers, from 2016-2019.

She and her husband live on four acres on the Central Coast of California. They have five grandchildren.

== Work ==
For fifteen years before she became a Benedictine oblate, Huston wrote literary fiction, often with artist protagonists or themes involving art. Her first novel, Daughters of Song, was a coming-of-age story about a young piano prodigy. As her interest in religion deepened, she switched to spiritual writing. In Signatures of Grace: Catholic Writers on the Sacraments, she and co-editor Tom Grady invited various authors including Ron Hansen, Paul Mariani, Mary Gordon, Patricia Hampl, Katherine Vaz, and Murray Bodo to contribute personal essays on the Catholic sacraments. Huston went on to write seven books of spiritual nonfiction, including The Holy Way: Practices for a Simple Life, a narrative account of the spiritual practices she learned from her association with the monks of New Camaldoli; By Way of Grace: Moving from Faithfulness to Holiness, about the cardinal and theological virtues; Forgiveness: Following Jesus into Radical Loving; Simplifying the Soul: Lenten Practices to Renew the Spirit; and A Season of Mystery: 10 Spiritual Practices for Embracing a Happier Second Half of Life.

In 2013, she published her second novel, A Land Without Sin, about a hardened young battlefield photojournalist seeking her missing priest brother in the jungles of Central America. In 2016, she returned to narrative spiritual nonfiction with One Ordinary Sunday: A Meditation on the Mystery of the Mass, an explanation of the historical roots and theological meaning of each element of the Catholic Mass. In 2021, she published a history of New Camaldoli Hermitage entitled The Hermits of Big Sur.

She has been a regular contributor to Give Us This Day (Liturgical Press) since 2011, writes essays for a series called Seton and Culture (St. Elizabeth Seton Shrine), and has done numerous interviews for blogs, magazines, radio shows, and podcasts.

== Novels ==
- A Land Without Sin (Slant Books, 2013) ISBN 9781620326589
- Daughters of Song (Random House, 1995) ISBN 9780679419693

== Nonfiction ==
=== Author ===
- The Hermits of Big Sur (Liturgical Press, 2021) ISBN 9780814685068
- One Ordinary Sunday: A Meditation on the Mystery of the Mass (Ave Maria Press, 2016) ISBN 9781594715952
- A Season of Mystery: 10 Spiritual Practices for Embracing a Happier Second Half of Life (Loyola Press, 2012) ISBN 9780829437546
- Simplifying the Soul: Lenten Practices to Renew Your Spirit (Ave Maria Press, 2011) ISBN 9781594712692
- Forgiveness: Following Jesus Into Radical Loving (Paraclete Press, 2009) ISBN 9781557255709
- By Way of Grace: Moving from Faithfulness to Holiness (Loyola Press, 2007) ISBN 9780829423310
- The Holy Way: Practices for a Simple Life (Loyola Press, 2003) ISBN 9780829414417

=== Co-editor and contributor ===
- Signatures of Grace: Catholic Writers on the Sacraments, contributed to the essay "Matrimony" (Dutton, 2000) ISBN 9780525945338

== Selected short stories ==
- "Pilgrimage," Image, Spring 2010
- "The Cattle Raid of Cooley," Image, Spring 2003
- "Serenissma," Missouri Review, Spring 1996
- "A Misery of Love," Story, Autumn 1993
- "Mercy," American Short Fiction, Winter 1992
- "War Story," North American Review, June 1989
- "Swimmer," The Massachusetts Review, Summer 1984 (written under name "Paula Keisler")
- "The Bouzouki," Virginia Quarterly Review, Spring 1983 (written under name "Paula A. Keisler")

== Selected essays ==
- "The Vocation of Women According to Elizabeth Seton and Sigrid Undset," Seton and Culture, Seton Shrine, May 13, 2022
- "At a Big Sur Monastery, an Ancient Model for Communal Life," Catholic Voices, U.S. Catholic, April 12, 2022
- "Henri Nouwen, Elizabeth Seton, and the Painful Price of Love," Seton and Culture, Seton Shrine, February 11, 2022
- "How to Catch an Eel," Books & Culture, July/August 2016
- "Gods, Guns, and Guatemala," Books & Culture, May/June 2014
- "God Amid the Materialism," The Christian Century, March 2015
- "Of Monks and Men," The Christian Century, March 2014
- "Attending to the Light: The Landscapes of David Dewey," Image, June 2013
- "Falling Into Prayer: Bede Griffith's Pilgrimage and Mine," The Christian Century, December 2012
- "Wake-up Call: A Midlife Spiritual Challenge," The Christian Century, January 2010
- "Liturgical Language as Antidote to Consumerist Chaos," Geez, Fall 2009
- "Bearing Light," Image, Fall 2008
- "The Kingdom of the Eternal Heaven," Image, Spring 2008
- "Salvation Workout: How I Found the Virtues," The Christian Century, April 2008
- "Grace," Geez, Spring 2007
- "The Art of Believing in Things Unseen," America, March 2007

== Selected lectures and interviews ==
- "Building Christian Communities Strong Enough to Last a Thousand Years," Los Angeles Religion Education Congress, March 20, 2022
- "The Hermits of Big Sur," Things Not Seen podcast interview with David Dault, January 2, 2022
- "Hermits of Big Sur," The God Show podcast with Ed McMahon, December 12, 2021
- "One Ordinary Sunday: A Meditation on the Mystery of the Mass," Subject Matters with Sebastian Gomes, Salt and Light Catholic Media Foundation, Toronto, April 2017, S2 E8
- "Welcoming the Stranger," Scott Center for Spiritual and Religious Life, Middlebury College, April 27, 2017
- "Lectio Divina: How an Ancient Monastic Practice Can Revitalize Literature," University of Notre Dame, "Trying to Say God" Catholic Literary Conference, June 22–24, 2017
- "New Camaldoli Hermitage," Religion & Ethics NewsWeekly, PBS, January 27, 2017
- "Writing as Spiritual Formation," Festival of Faith and Writing, Calvin College, Grand Rapids, Michigan, April 19, 2012
- "Preparing Ourselves for Lent," Ignatian Center, Santa Clara University, Santa Clara, California, January 25, 2012
- "Focusing On Forgiveness," Renovare Leadership Conference, St. Francis in the Fields Episcopalian Church, Louisville, Kentucky, February 18–20, 2011
- "Salvation Work-Out," Valle Crucis Conference Center, bishop and clergy of the Episcopalian Diocese of Western South Carolina, March 14–16, 2011
- "Can Christian Forgiveness Be Reconciled with the Death Penalty?" Newman University, Wichita, Kansas, April 2010
- "The Impossible Art of Forgiving" and "Praying Like a Monk: A Contemplative Path Through the Chaos," Los Angeles Catholic Religious Education Congress, March 2010
- "The Death of Reason" (Newman Lecture), Oregon State University, Corvalis, Oregon, Fall 2006

== Awards and honors ==
- The Hermits of Big Sur, The Englewood Review of Books, 25 Best Books of 2021
- One Ordinary Sunday, First Place, General Interest Category, Association of Catholic Publishers, 2017 Excellence in Publishing Awards
- One Ordinary Sunday, First Place, Popular Presentation of the Catholic Faith, Catholic Press Association, 2017 Book Awards
- Chrysostom Society Member, 2013–present
- A Season of Mystery, Spirituality & Practice, Top Fifty Books of 2012
- "The Kingdom of the Eternal Heaven," Best Spiritual Writing, 2010
- The Holy Way, Catholic Press Association Award, 2004
- The Holy Way, Bronze Medal for Religious Book of the Year, ForeWord Magazine, 2003
- The Holy Way, Catholic Book Club main selection, America, 2004
- Starred reviews from Publishers Weekly for The Holy Way and Signatures of Grace
- Daughters of Song, The Christian Science Monitor's Novelist Debut review, 1995
- National Endowment for the Arts Fellowship in Creative Writing, 1994
- "A Misery of Love," The Best American Short Stories, 100 Distinguished Stories of 1994
- "Mercy," The Best American Short Stories, 100 Distinguished Stories of 1993

== Anthologized work ==
- "Anatomy of a Conversion," What I Am Living For: Lessons from the Life and Writings of Thomas Merton (Ave Maria Press, 2018)
- "The Good Earth," The Wonder Years: 40 Women Over 40 (Kregel Publications, 2018)
- "Now and at the Hour of Our Death," Word By Word: Slowing Down with the Hail Mary (Ave Maria Press, 2015)
- "The Buried Life: Bede Griffiths," Not Less than Everything: Catholic Writers on Heroes of Conscience from Joan of Arc to Oscar Romero (HarperOne, 2013)
- "The Kingdom of the Eternal Heaven," Best Spiritual Essays (Penguin Books, 2010)
- "The Sacrament of Matrimony," Faith at the Edge: A New Generation of Catholic Writers Reflects on Life, Love, Sex, and Other Mysteries (Ave Maria Press, 2008)
- "At the Source," Take Heart: Catholic Writers on Hope in Our Time (Herder & Herder, 2007)
