= Kristen Maitland =

- Education: California Polytechnic State University; University of Texas at Austin
- Scientific career
- Workplaces: Texas A&M University; Lawrence Livermore National Laboratory

Kristen Carlson Maitland is an associate professor at Texas A&M University. She develops optical instrumentation for the detection and diagnosis of diseases, including infection and cancer. She has served on the Board of Directors of SPIE.

== Education and early career ==
Maitland grew up in California. She attended the Exploratorium as a child, and became interested in the creative science exhibits. At the time a new rollercoaster was being developed, and Maitland stepped in to help fix it. One of the Exploratorium employees asked if she was an engineering student. She had arthroscopic surgery as a teenager which made her interested in optics. She studied electrical engineering at the California Polytechnic State University, where she earned her bachelor's and master's degrees. She moved to the University of Texas at Austin for her doctoral studies, and earned her PhD in 2006. After completing her graduate studies, she joined the Lawrence Livermore National Laboratory as a staff scientist. She joined the faculty at Texas A&M University in 2008.

== Research ==
Maitland works on the early detection of cancers and tuberculosis using multi-modal optical imaging. This involves fluorescence-lifetime imaging microscopy for initial guidance and reflectance confocal microscopy for the detection of cellular changes. The fluorescence signals can be detected from outside the body or through optical fibres. She is interested in the miniaturisation of these devices to increase the scanning speed and depth.

For the detection of bacterial infection Maitland uses optical fibres to excited near-infrared optical reporters inside the lung. Fluorescence signals are monitored outside the lungs and used to quantify the levels of bacterial infection. The fibres use a diffuse fibre excitation source that allows them to get closer to pathogens in the lungs, making high resolution imaging possible.

=== Awards and honours ===
Her awards and honours include;

- 2013 National Science Foundation CAREER Award
- 2019 William Keeler Memorial Award

She is a Fellow of SPIE and Institute of Electrical and Electronics Engineers. She was elected to the Board of Directors at SPIE in 2017. In 2019 Maitland was inducted into the American Institute for Medical and Biological Engineering College of Fellows.

=== Selected publications ===
Her publications include;

- Maitland, Kristen C. (2011). "Confocal Endomicroscopy: Instrumentation and Medical Applications". Annals of Biomedical Engineering. 40 (2): 378–397. doi:10.1007/s10439-011-0426-y. PMC 3710661. PMID 21994069.
- Maitland, Kristen C. (2005). "In vivo fiber-optic confocal reflectance microscope with an injection-molded plastic miniature objective lens". Applied Optics. 44 (10): 1792–1797. Bibcode:2005ApOpt..44.1792C. doi:10.1364/AO.44.001792. PMID 15813514.
- Maitland, Kristen C. (2008). "In vivo imaging of oral neoplasia using a miniaturized fiber optic confocal reflectance microscope". Oral Oncology. 44 (11): 1059–1066. doi:10.1016/j.oraloncology.2008.02.002. PMC 2673342. PMID 18396445.

Maitland serves on the editorial board of the Journal of Biomedical Optics.
