= Kirk Perron =

American businessman (1964-2020)

- Born: March 21, 1964; Huntington Park, California
- Died: June 20, 2020 (aged 56); Palm Springs, California
- Education: Cuesta Community College
- Title: Founder of Jamba Juice

Kirk Perron (March 21, 1964 – June 20, 2020) was an American businessman, and the founder of Jamba Juice.

== Life and career ==
He was born on March 21, 1964, in Huntington Park, California. At 16 years old, He started working at Safeway as an assistant manager.

On March 31, 1990; after leaving the California Polytechnic State University, Kirk Perron borrowed $30,000 from Lea Perron, and opened his first shop "Juice Club" in San Luis Obispo. By 1996, Kirk Perron's Juice Club has over 30 locations, including 12 franchised stores, but Perron later abandoned the franchise model in favor of company-owned stores.

In 1995, his company was renamed Jamba Juice, drawing from a West African word for "celebration". Four years later, Jamba Juice acquired Zuka Juice on March 24, 1999, renaming all of its Zuka stores with the "Jamba" name. Perron left Jamba Juice in 2006 because of the acquisition by Services Acquisition Corp. International.

=== Death ===
Perron died from cardiac arrest in Palm Springs, California on June 20, 2020, at the age of 56. According to The Wall Street Journal, Perron suffered from manic depressive episodes and, in the time leading up to his death, suffered a broken hip.

== Publications ==
- Jamba Juice Power (December 29, 2003), Penguin Books. ISBN 978-1-440628-03-0.
