= Barton Williams =

American former hurdler (born 1956)

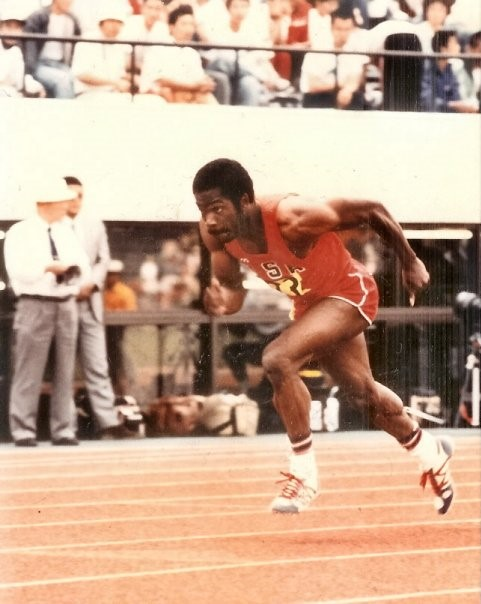
Barton Williams

Barton Williams (born September 20, 1956) is an American former hurdler. He attended California Polytechnic State University from 1975 to 1979. Williams is one of Cal Poly's all-time greatest track and field athletes.

== Career ==
Barton Williams is a member of the U.S. Track & Field and Cross Country Coaches Association NCAA Division II Track & Field Athlete Hall of Fame. Bart Williams represented the U.S. in 10 international competitions and held several Cal Poly school records, including one NCAA Division II 400 m hurdles record. He was also a recipient of the 2005 Distinguished Alumnus Cal Poly Track & Field Award and the California State Assembly Resolution Award for Outstanding Athlete in 1979. Williams was the cross country running coach at Vallejo High School in Vallejo, California. He has coached track at Contra Costa College in Richmond, CA.

In 1979, Bart was among the few athletes to earn All-American honours in both NCAA Division I & II track and field events. Barton Williams made history by becoming the first athlete from Vallejo, CA to qualify as a member of the U.S. Olympic Team for the 1980. He did not compete due to President Jimmy Carter's decision to boycott the 1980 Olympic Games in Moscow, U.S.S.R., following the Soviet Union's invasion of Afghanistan in December 1979. In 2001, Barton Williams served as an assistant coach for the U.S. World University Games team in China, focusing on men's hurdles and the horizontal jumps. In 1980, he received one of 461 Congressional Gold Medals created specifically for the athletes affected by the boycott.

== Achievements ==
- Cal Poly Sport Hall of Fame: Inducted Oct 1998
- Cal Poly Cross Country and Track & Field Hall of Fame : Inducted January 12, 1991
- World & US Ranking from 1979, 1980, 1981, 1984, 1987– Highest world Ranking 6th
- Qualified for USA Olympic Team 1980
- NCAA All-American Ten times: 1976–1979
- West Coast Relay College Most Outstanding Athletes 1979 Fresno, CA
- Cal Poly Most Valuable- Barton Williams, Dan Aldridge, Jim Schankle 1979
- Cal Poly Most Valuable- Barton Williams, Jim Schankle 1978

== School records ==
- Cal Poly-San Luis Obispo school records Holder in the 400-meter hurdles
- 400m – 4 × 100 m relay – 4 × 400 m relay – 4 × 200 m relay – distance medley relay
- CCAA conference records Holder in the 400m, 200m, 4X100 RELAY, 4X400 RELAY, 1978
- CCAA conference champion 400m, 200m 4x100 relay, 4x400 relay 1978& 1979
- NCAA Division II champion and former record holder 400 meter hurdles, 1979
- NCAA Division II champion, 4x100 relay 1979

== USA teams ==
- USA & Great Britain duel meet Team 1981 London, England
- Pacific Conference Games 1981 Auckland, New Zealand
- United States Olympic Team Member, 1980, 400IH Boycott Moscow, U.S.S.R.
- Eight Nation Games 1979& 1980 Tokyo, Japan
- Pan- American Games Team Member 1979 San Juan, Puerto Rico
- Sparakiad Games 1979 Moscow, Russia
- World University Games Team Member 1979 Mexico City, Mexico
- PRE – Commonwealth Games Trial 1978 Edmonton, Canada
- Sport Festival West Team 1978 Colorado Springs, Colorado
