= Gina Oceguera =

Mexican footballer (born 1977)

Personal information
- Full name: Regina Marie Oceguera Schmuhl
- Date of birth: 4 September 1977 (age 49)
- Place of birth: Mountain View, California, United States
- Height: 5 ft 9 in (1.75 m)
- Positions: Defender; forward

Youth career
- 1989–1995: De Anza Magic
- 1996: Silicon Valley Red Devils

College career
Years	Team	Apps	(Gls)
1995–1999	Cal Poly Mustangs		

Senior career*
Years	Team	Apps	(Gls)
2000	Sacramento Storm		
2001	San Diego Spirit	2	(0)
2001–2002	Bay Area CyberRays	8	(0)

International career^{‡}
1998–2002	Mexico		
- * Club domestic league appearances and goals as of 14:37, 22 December 2013 (UTC) ‡ National team caps and goals as of 14:37, 22 December 2013 (UTC)

Regina Marie Oceguera Schmuhl (born 4 September 1977), known in the U.S. as Gina Eagleson, is an American-born Mexican former professional footballer who captained the Mexico national team at the 1999 FIFA Women's World Cup. She also played for American soccer team Bay Area CyberRays in the Women's United Soccer Association (WUSA).

== Playing career ==
=== College ===
At Cal Poly San Luis Obispo, Oceguera was selected as the Big West Conference Player of the Year in 1997.

Collegiate Statistics
Season	Apps.	Goals	Assists
1995 (Fr.)	17	11	5
1996 (RS)	-	-	-
1997 (So.)	20	13	6
1998 (Jr.)	16	11	4
1999 (Sr.)	15	4	2
Totals	68	39	17

=== Club ===
In 2000 Oceguera played for Women's Premier Soccer League (WPSL) team Sacramento Storm.

She was drafted by San Diego Spirit ahead of the inaugural 2001 season of the Women's United Soccer Association (WUSA). When Joy Fawcett returned to San Diego from maternity leave in mid-season, Oceguera was cut from the roster to accommodate her. She had totaled 18 minutes of action across two games.

The Bay Area CyberRays then picked up Oceguera, who was delighted to be signed by her local team. Her $1,000-per-month contract was small compared to the league average which was in excess of $40,000-a-year. An anterior cruciate ligament injury sidelined the CyberRays' Australian defender Dianne Alagich and gave Oceguera an opportunity to play. She contributed to the team's success in winning the first ever WUSA Founders Cup.

In 2002, Oceguera quit soccer to pursue a career in teaching.

=== International ===
A promising forward for Cal Poly Mustangs in college soccer, Oceguera was converted to a defender by Mexico's coach Leonardo Cuéllar. She was one of several Californian players with Mexican eligibility to be called up by Cuéllar. She played as a sweeper for Mexico at the 1999 FIFA Women's World Cup, captaining the team in their opening 7–1 defeat by Brazil.

== See also ==
- List of Mexican footballers
