= 1980 Eastern Illinois Panthers football team =

American college football season

1980 Eastern Illinois Panthers football

Mid-Con champion

NCAA Division II Championship, L 13–21 vs. Cal Poly
- Conference: Association of Mid-Continent Universities
- Record: 11–3 (4–0 Mid-Con)
- Head coach: Darrell Mudra (3rd season)
- Home stadium: O'Brien Stadium

1980 Association of Mid-Continent Universities football standings
| | Conf. | | | | | Overall |
| Team | W | | L | | T | W | | L | | T |
|---|---|---|---|---|---|---|---|---|---|---|
| Eastern Illinois $^ | 4 | – | 0 | – | 0 | 11 | – | 3 | – | 0 |
| Northern Michigan ^ | 3 | – | 1 | – | 0 | 9 | – | 2 | – | 0 |
| Northern Iowa | 2 | – | 2 | – | 0 | 7 | – | 4 | – | 0 |
| Youngstown State | 1 | – | 3 | – | 0 | 2 | – | 8 | – | 1 |
| Western Illinois | 0 | – | 4 | – | 0 | 4 | – | 6 | – | 0 |
$ – Conference champion; ^ – NCAA Division II playoff participant

The 1980 Eastern Illinois Panthers football team represented the Eastern Illinois University during the 1980 NCAA Division II football season, and completed the 79th season of Panther football. The Panthers played their home games at O'Brien Stadium in Charleston, Illinois. This season was the last that Eastern Illinois played at the Division II level.

== Schedule ==
| Date | Time | Opponent | Rank | Site | Result | Attendance | Source |
|---|---|---|---|---|---|---|---|
| September 6 | | South Dakota* | | O'Brien Stadium; Charleston, IL | W 34–21 | 6,500 | |
| September 13 | | at Southern Illinois* | | McAndrew Stadium; Carbondale, IL | L 35–37 | 17,150 | |
| September 20 | | at Indiana State* | | Memorial Stadium; Terre Haute, IN | L 0–14 | 15,368 | |
| September 27 | | Northeast Missouri State* | | O'Brien Stadium; Charleston, IL | W 41–7 | 5,700 | |
| October 4 | | Illinois State* | | O'Brien Stadium; Charleston, IL (rivalry) | W 31–14 | 10,500 | |
| October 11 | | at Central State (OH)* | No. 8 | McPherson Stadium; Wilberforce, OH | W 40–15 | 3,500 | |
| October 18 | | at Western Illinois | No. 6 | Hanson Field; Macomb, IL | W 37–7 | 12,144 | |
| October 25 | | Youngstown State | No. 5 | O'Brien Stadium; Charleston, IL | W 32–7 | 5,200 | |
| November 1 | | at No. 1 Northern Michigan | No. 2 | Superior Dome; Marquette, MI | W 35–28 | 3,719 | |
| November 8 | | No. T–9 Northern Iowa | No. 1 | O'Brien Stadium; Charleston, IL | W 14–9 | 12,600 | |
| November 15 | | Augustana (SD)* | No. 1 | O'Brien Stadium; Charleston, IL | W 52–13 | 3,200 | |
| November 29 | 12:30 p.m. | No. 10 Northern Colorado | No. 1 | O'Brien Stadium; Charleston, IL (NCAA Division II First Round) | W 21–14 | | |
| December 6 | | at No. 5 North Alabama | No. 1 | Braly Municipal Stadium; Florence, AL (NCAA Division II Semifinal) | W 56–31 | | |
| December 13 | | vs. No. 3 Cal Poly | No. 1 | University Stadium; Albuquerque, NM (Zia Bowl—NCAA Division II Championship Game) | L 13–21 | 2,056 | |
*Non-conference game; Rankings from Associated Press Poll released prior to the game; All times are in Central time

== Roster ==
1980 Eastern Illinois Panthers football team roster
Players
Coaches
Offense

| Pos. | # | Name | Class |
|---|---|---|---|
| G | 62 | Blair Brown | Sr |
| QB | 11 | Jeff Christensen | So |
| OT | 70 | Clinton Davenport | Sr |
| C | 60 | Scott Gilleland | Jr |
| WR | 90 | Otis Grant | Sr |
| WR | 25 | Scott McGhee | Sr |
| TE | 81 | Rob Mehalic | Jr |
| TE | 80 | Doug Neff | Jr |
| C | 76 | George Tuzil | So |
| G | 75 | Tom Vanderveen | Sr |
| WR | 88 | Scott Weber | Jr |
| QB | 14 | Steve Wright | Sr |

Defense

| Pos. | # | Name | Class |
|---|---|---|---|
| CB | 44 | Rich Brown | Sr |
| DE | 61 | Mike Cox |
| S | 10 | Kevin Gray | Jr |
| CB | 20 | Wilbert James | Jr |
| LB | 46 | Ira Jefferson | Jr |
| DT | 66 | Charlie Krutsinger | Sr |
| FS | 48 | Chris Merenowicz | Sr |
| LB | 53 | Bill Mines | So |
| LB | 57 | Tom Murray | Sr |
| DE | 79 | Steve Parker | Sr |
| SS | 18 | Don Pittman | Sr |
| DT | 86 | Keith Wojnowski | So |

Special teams

| Pos. | # | Name | Class |

Head coach

- Darrell Mudra

Coordinators/assistant coaches

Legend

- (C) Team captain
- (S) Suspended
- (I) Ineligible
- Injured
- Redshirt
