= 1980 Cal Poly Pomona Broncos football team =

American college football season

1980 Cal Poly Pomona Broncos football
- Conference: California Collegiate Athletic Association
- Record: 3–7 (0–2 CCAA)
- Head coach: Roman Gabriel (1st season)
- Home stadium: Kellogg Field

1980 California Collegiate Athletic Association football standings
| | Conf. | | | | | Overall |
| Team | W | | L | | T | W | | L | | T |
|---|---|---|---|---|---|---|---|---|---|---|
| No. 3 Cal Poly $^ | 2 | – | 0 | – | 0 | 10 | – | 3 | – | 0 |
| Cal State Northridge | 1 | – | 1 | – | 0 | 5 | – | 6 | – | 0 |
| Cal Poly Pomona | 0 | – | 2 | – | 0 | 3 | – | 7 | – | 0 |
$ – Conference champion; ^ – NCAA Division II playoff participant; Rankings from Associated Press poll

The 1980 Cal Poly Pomona Broncos football team represented California State Polytechnic University, Pomona as a member of the California Collegiate Athletic Association (CCAA) during the 1980 NCAA Division II football season. Led by first-year head coach Roman Gabriel, Cal Poly Pomona compiled an overall record of 3–7 with a mark of 0–2 in conference play, placing last out of three teams in the CCAA. The team was outscored by its opponents 322 to 171 for the season. Those totals included an 86-point defeat by a score of 93–7 at the hands of Portland State on October 25. The Broncos played home games at Kellogg Field in Pomona, California.

== Schedule ==
| Date | Opponent | Site | Result | Attendance | Source |
|---|---|---|---|---|---|
| September 13 | at Puget Sound* | Baker Stadium; Tacoma, WA | L 15–16 | 3,000–4,000 | |
| September 20 | Sacramento State* | Kellogg Field; Pomona, CA | W 27–7 | 4,000 | |
| September 27 | at San Francisco State* | Cox Stadium; San Francisco, CA | W 20–17 | 1,327 | |
| October 4 | Santa Clara* | Kellogg Field; Pomona, CA | L 14–30 | 4,650 | |
| October 11 | at Southern Utah State* | Eccles Coliseum; Cedar City, UT | W 38–37 | 1,411 | |
| October 18 | at UC Davis* | Toomey Field; Davis, CA | L 21–35 | 7,600 | |
| October 25 | at Portland State* | Civic Stadium; Portland, OR | L 7–93 | 6,152 | |
| November 1 | Cal Lutheran* | Kellogg Field; Pomona, CA | L 13–20 | 4,124 | |
| November 8 | No. 4 Cal Poly | Kellogg Field; Pomona, CA | L 0–36 | 4,781 | |
| November 22 | at Cal State Northridge | Devonshire Downs; Northridge, CA | L 16–31 | 1,000 | |
*Non-conference game; Rankings from Associated Press Poll released prior to the game
