= 1980 UC Davis Aggies football team =

American college football season

1980 UC Davis Aggies football

FWC champion
- Conference: Far Western Conference
- Record: 7–2–1 (5–0 FWC)
- Head coach: Jim Sochor (11th season)
- Home stadium: Toomey Field

1980 Far Western Conference football standings
	Conf.					Overall
Team	W		L		T	W		L		T
UC Davis $	5	–	0	–	0	7	–	2	–	1
Cal State Hayward	3	–	2	–	0	6	–	4	–	0
Chico State	3	–	2	–	0	5	–	5	–	0
San Francisco State	2	–	3	–	0	3	–	6	–	1
Sacramento State	1	–	4	–	0	3	–	7	–	0
Humboldt State	1	–	4	–	0	2	–	8	–	0
$ – Conference champion

The 1980 UC Davis Aggies football team represented the University of California, Davis as a member of the Far Western Conference (FWC) during the 1980 NCAA Division II football season. Led by 11th-year head coach Jim Sochor, UC Davis compiled an overall record of 7–2–1 with a mark of 5–0 in conference play, winning the FWC title for the tenth consecutive season. 1980 was the 11th consecutive winning season for the Aggies. With the 5–0 conference record, they stretched their conference winning streak to 38 games dating back to the 1973 season. The team outscored its opponents 267 to 178 for the season. The Aggies played home games at Toomey Field in Davis, California.

== Schedule ==
Date	Opponent	Site	Result	Attendance	Source
September 13	at Nevada*	Mackay Stadium; Reno, NV	T 13–13	9,897	
September 20	at Cal State Northridge*	North Campus Stadium; Northridge, CA	W 27–7	1,000–2,200	
September 27	Cal Poly*	Toomey Field; Davis, CA (rivlary)	L 25–28	8,900–9,000	
October 4	at Sacramento State	Charles C. Hughes Stadium; Sacramento, CA (rivalry)	W 16–6	5,683–7,200	
October 11	Humboldt State	Toomey Field; Davis, CA	W 20–17	8,100	
October 18	Cal Poly Pomona*	Toomey Field; Davis, CA	W 35–21	7,600	
October 25	at San Francisco State	Cox Stadium; San Francisco, CA	W 48–32	3,414–3,416	
November 1	No. 9 Santa Clara*	Toomey Field; Davis, CA	L 27–34	9,700	
November 8	at Chico State	University Stadium; Chico, CA	W 35–4	4,542	
November 15	Cal State Hayward	Toomey Field; Davis, CA	W 21–16	6,500–6,880	
*Non-conference game; Rankings from Associated Press Poll released prior to the game
