= 1980 Sacramento State Hornets football team =

American college football season

1980 Sacramento State Hornets football
- Conference: Far Western Conference
- Record: 3–7 (1–4 FWC)
- Head coach: Bob Mattos (3rd season)
- Home stadium: Hornet Stadium

1980 Far Western Conference football standings
	Conf.					Overall
Team	W		L		T	W		L		T
UC Davis $	5	–	0	–	0	7	–	2	–	1
Cal State Hayward	3	–	2	–	0	6	–	4	–	0
Chico State	3	–	2	–	0	5	–	5	–	0
San Francisco State	2	–	3	–	0	3	–	6	–	1
Sacramento State	1	–	4	–	0	3	–	7	–	0
Humboldt State	1	–	4	–	0	2	–	8	–	0
$ – Conference champion

The 1980 Sacramento State Hornets football team represented California State University, Sacramento as a member of the Far Western Conference (FWC) during the 1980 NCAA Division II football season. Led by third-year head coach Bob Mattos, Sacramento State compiled an overall record of 3–7 with a mark of 1–4 in conference play, tying for fifth place the FWC. The team was outscored by its opponents 185 to 161 for the season. The Hornets played home games at Hornet Stadium in Sacramento, California.

== Schedule ==
Date	Opponent	Site	Result	Attendance	Source
September 13	Eastern Washington*	Hornet Stadium; Sacramento, CA	L 10–12	2,000	
September 20	at Cal Poly Pomona*	Kellogg Field; Pomona, CA	L 7–27	4,000	
October 4	UC Davis	Hornet Stadium; Sacramento, CA (rivalry)	L 6–16	5,683–7,200	
October 11	at San Francisco State	Cox Stadium; San Francisco, CA	L 0–19	1,413	
October 18	Cal Lutheran*	Hornet Stadium; Sacramento, CA	W 28–13	1,167	
October 25	Chico State	Hornet Stadium; Sacramento, CA	L 22–24	5,100	
November 1	at Cal State Hayward	Pioneer Stadium; Hayward, CA	L 10–14	500–1,800	
November 8	at Cal State Northridge*	North Campus Stadium; Northridge, CA	L 20–24	3,500	
November 15	Humboldt State	Hornet Stadium; Sacramento, CA	W 34–17	2,700	
November 22	at No. 3 Cal Poly*	Mustang Stadium; San Luis Obispo, CA	W 24–19	5,470	
*Non-conference game; Rankings from Associated Press Poll released prior to the game
