= 1980 North Dakota State Bison football team =

American college football season

1980 North Dakota State Bison football
- Conference: North Central Conference
- Record: 6–4 (5–2 NCC)
- Head coach: Don Morton (2nd season)
- Defensive coordinator: Mike Daly (2nd season)
- Home stadium: Dacotah Field

1980 North Central Conference football standings
	Conf.					Overall
Team	W		L		T	W		L		T
No. 10 Northern Colorado $^	6	–	1	–	0	7	–	4	–	0
Nebraska–Omaha	5	–	2	–	0	7	–	3	–	0
North Dakota	5	–	2	–	0	6	–	4	–	0
North Dakota State	5	–	2	–	0	6	–	4	–	0
South Dakota *	3	–	3	–	1	5	–	6	–	0
Augustana (SD)	2	–	5	–	0	2	–	7	–	1
South Dakota State *	1	–	5	–	1	3	–	8	–	0
Morningside	0	–	7	–	0	2	–	8	–	0
+ – Conference co-champions; ^ – NCAA Division II playoff participant; * – South Dakota and South Dakota State split two head-to-head games, which counted as a tie for each team in the conference standings.; Rankings from AP Poll

The 1980 North Dakota State Bison football team was an American football team that represented North Dakota State University during the 1980 NCAA Division II football season as a member of the North Central Conference. In their second year under head coach Don Morton, the team compiled a 6–4 record.

== Schedule ==
Date	Opponent	Site	Result	Attendance	Source
September 6	Northern Michigan*	Dacotah Field; Fargo, ND	L 0–10	9,300	
September 13	Northern Arizona*	Dacotah Field; Fargo, ND	W 27–14	7,100	
September 20	at Nebraska–Omaha	Al F. Caniglia Field; Omaha, NE	L 7–28	7,200	
September 27	Northern Colorado	Dacotah Field; Fargo, ND	W 17–7	7,200	
October 4	at North Dakota	Memorial Stadium; Grand Forks, ND (Nickel Trophy)	L 20–38	14,500	
October 11	Morningside^{†}	Dacotah Field; Fargo, ND	W 16–7	7,700	
October 18	at South Dakota State	Coughlin–Alumni Stadium; Brookings, SD (rivalry)	W 23–16	6,499	
October 25	at Augustana (SD)	Howard Wood Field; Sioux Falls, SD	W 26–15	563	
November 1	South Dakota	Dacotah Field; Fargo, ND	W 49–7	3,500	
November 8	at Montana State*	Reno H. Sales Stadium; Bozeman, MT	L 19–21	5,121	
*Non-conference game; ^{†}Homecoming
