= 1980 Cal State Northridge Matadors football team =

American college football season

1980 Cal State Northridge Matadors football
- Conference: California Collegiate Athletic Association
- Record: 5–6 (1–1 CCAA)
- Head coach: Tom Keele (2nd season)
- Home stadium: North Campus Stadium

1980 California Collegiate Athletic Association football standings
	Conf.					Overall
Team	W		L		T	W		L		T
No. 3 Cal Poly $^	2	–	0	–	0	10	–	3	–	0
Cal State Northridge	1	–	1	–	0	5	–	6	–	0
Cal Poly Pomona	0	–	2	–	0	3	–	7	–	0
$ – Conference champion; ^ – NCAA Division II playoff participant; Rankings from Associated Press poll

The 1980 Cal State Northridge Matadors football team represented California State University, Northridge as a member of the California Collegiate Athletic Association (CCAA) during the 1980 NCAA Division II football season. Led by second-year head coach Tom Keele, Cal State Northridge compiled an overall record of 5–6 with a mark of 1–1 in conference play, placing second in the CCAA. The team was outscored by its opponents 263 to 188 for the season. The Matadors played home games at North Campus Stadium in Northridge, California.

== Schedule ==
Date	Opponent	Site	Result	Attendance	Source
September 6	at San Francisco State*	Cox Stadium; San Francisco, CA	W 13–10	1,065	
September 13	at Cal State Hayward*	Pioneer Stadium; Hayward, CA	L 14–19	300–860	
September 20	UC Davis*	North Campus Stadium; Northridge, CA	L 7–27	1,000–2,200	
September 27	Sonoma State*	North Campus Stadium; Northridge, CA	W 35–24	300–500	
October 11	at Chico State*	University Stadium; Chico, CA	L 12–39	300–1,100	
October 18	at Nevada*	Mackay Stadium; Reno, NV	L 3–31	8,576	
October 25	at Cal Lutheran*	Mt. Clef Field; Thousand Oaks, CA	W 30–0	2,000	
November 1	at No. 5 Cal Poly	Mustang Stadium; San Luis Obispo, CA	L 6–35	8,170	
November 8	Sacramento State*	North Campus Stadium; Northridge, CA	W 24–20	3,500	
November 15	at Santa Clara*	Buck Shaw Stadium; Santa Clara, CA	L 13–42	6,700	
November 22	Cal Poly Pomona	North Campus Stadium; Northridge, CA	W 31–16	1,000	
*Non-conference game; Rankings from Associated Press Poll released prior to the game

== Team players in the NFL ==
No Cal State Northridge players were selected in the 1981 NFL draft.

The following finished their college career in 1980, were not drafted, but played in the NFL.

Player	Position	First NFL team
Alvin Hooks	WR	1981 Philadelphia Eagles
