= 1980 Troy State Trojans football team =

American college football season

1980 Troy State Trojans football
- Conference: Gulf South Conference
- Record: 8–2 (4–2 GSC)
- Head coach: Charlie Bradshaw (5th season)
- Home stadium: Veterans Memorial Stadium

1980 Gulf South Conference football standings
	Conf.					Overall
Team	W		L		T	W		L		T
No. 5 North Alabama $^	6	–	0	–	0	10	–	2	–	0
No. 4 Jacksonville State ^	6	–	1	–	0	8	–	2	–	0
Troy State	4	–	2	–	0	8	–	2	–	0
Livingston	2	–	4	–	0	5	–	5	–	0
Mississippi College	2	–	4	–	0	4	–	5	–	0
Tennessee–Martin	2	–	4	–	0	4	–	7	–	0
Delta State	0	–	6	–	0	3	–	8	–	0
$ – Conference champion; ^ – NCAA Division II playoff participant; Rankings from AP Poll

The 1980 Troy State Trojans football team represented Troy State University (now known as Troy University) as a member of the Gulf South Conference (GSC) during the 1980 NCAA Division II football season. Led by fifth-year head coach Charlie Bradshaw, the Trojans compiled an overall record of 8–2, with a mark of 4–2 in conference play, and finished third in the GSC.

== Schedule ==
Date	Opponent	Rank	Site	Result	Attendance	Source
September 13	at Texas A&I*		Javelina Stadium; Kingsville, TX	W 14–7	8,200	
September 20	Tennessee–Martin		Veterans Memorial Stadium; Troy, AL	W 30–0	7,200	
September 27	at Nicholls State*	No. 3	John L. Guidry Stadium; Thibodaux, LA	W 25–15	6,400–6,800	
October 4	Mississippi College	No. 3	Veterans Memorial Stadium; Troy, AL	W 30–0	6,500	
October 11	at Southeastern Louisiana*	No. 3	Strawberry Stadium; Hammond, LA	W 21–10	9,300	
October 18	Delta State	No. 3	Veterans Memorial Stadium; Troy, AL	W 35–7	4,000	
October 25	at No. 9 North Alabama	No. 3	Braly Municipal Stadium; Florence, AL	L 22–31	11,000	
November 1	Tennessee Tech*	No. 7	Veterans Memorial Stadium; Troy, AL	W 52–3	8,100	
November 8	Livingston	No. 7	Rip Hewes Stadium; Dothan, AL	W 37–20	6,000	
November 15	at No. 3 Jacksonville State	No. 5	Paul Snow Stadium; Jacksonville, AL (rivalry)	L 8–13	13,000	
*Non-conference game; Rankings from AP Poll released prior to the game
