= Jim Lohr =

American football player and coach (1934–2017)

James Lohr
Biographical details
- Born: September 22, 1934; Colchester, Illinois, U.S.
- Died: June 24, 2017 (aged 82); Cape Girardeau, Missouri, U.S.

Playing career
- 1952–1955: Southwest Missouri State
- 1958: Baltimore Colts
- Position: Tackle

Coaching career (HC unless noted)
- 1961–1968: Poplar Bluff HS (MO)
- 1969–1973: Southeast Missouri State (DL)
- 1974–1983: Southeast Missouri State

Head coaching record
- Overall: 52–53–4 (college)

Accomplishments and honors

Championships
- 3 MIAA (1975–1977)

James Loren Lohr (September 22, 1934 – June 24, 2017) was an American football player and coach. He was selected 307th overall in the 26th round by the Baltimore Colts in the 1956 NFL draft, but he was unable to participate due to an injury sustained during training camp. Lohr served as the head football coach at Southeast Missouri State University from 1974 to 1983, compiling a record of 52–53–4.

== Head coaching record ==
=== Football ===
Year	Team	Overall	Conference	Standing	Bowl/playoffs
Southeast Missouri State Indians (Missouri Intercollegiate Athletic Association) (1974–1983)
1974	Southeast Missouri State	7–4	4–2	T–3rd	
1975	Southeast Missouri State	7–4	6–0	1st	
1976	Southeast Missouri State	7–3–1	4–1–1	T–1st	
1977	Southeast Missouri State	7–3–1	4–1–1	T–1st	
1978	Southeast Missouri State	6–5	2–4	T–4th	
1979	Southeast Missouri State	6–4–1	5–1	2nd	
1980	Southeast Missouri State	4–7	3–3	T–3rd	
1981	Southeast Missouri State	2–9	2–3	5th	
1982	Southeast Missouri State	5–5–1	3–2	T–2nd	
1983	Southeast Missouri State	1–9	1–4	T–5th	
Southeast Missouri State:		52–53–4	34–21–2		
Total:		52–53–4			
National championship Conference title Conference division title or championship game berth
