= 1980 Jacksonville State Gamecocks football team =

American college football season

1980 Jacksonville State Gamecocks football

NCAA Division II First Round, L 0–15 at Cal Poly
- Conference: Gulf South Conference
- Record: 8–3 (6–1 GSC)
- Head coach: Jim Fuller (4th season)
- Offensive coordinator: Jack White (2nd season)
- Defensive coordinator: Jerry Beach (2nd season)
- Home stadium: Paul Snow Stadium

1980 Gulf South Conference football standings
	Conf.					Overall
Team	W		L		T	W		L		T
No. 5 North Alabama $^	6	–	0	–	0	10	–	2	–	0
No. 4 Jacksonville State ^	6	–	1	–	0	8	–	2	–	0
Troy State	4	–	2	–	0	8	–	2	–	0
Livingston	2	–	4	–	0	5	–	5	–	0
Mississippi College	2	–	4	–	0	4	–	5	–	0
Tennessee–Martin	2	–	4	–	0	4	–	7	–	0
Delta State	0	–	6	–	0	3	–	8	–	0
$ – Conference champion; ^ – NCAA Division II playoff participant; Rankings from AP Poll

The 1980 Jacksonville State Gamecocks football team represented Jacksonville State University as a member of the Gulf South Conference (GSC) during the 1980 NCAA Division II football season. Led by fourth-year head coach Jim Fuller, the Gamecocks compiled an overall record of 8–3 with a mark of 6–1 in conference play, and finished second in the GSC. In the playoffs, Jacksonville State were defeated by Cal Poly in the first round.

== Schedule ==
Date	Opponent	Rank	Site	Result	Attendance	Source
September 6	Chattanooga*		Paul Snow Stadium; Jacksonville, AL	L 13–16	12,000	
September 13	Mississippi College		Paul Snow Stadium; Jacksonville, AL	W 51–14	10,000	
September 20	at Alabama A&M*		Milton Frank Stadium; Huntsville, AL	W 29–28	10,000	
September 27	Alabama State*		Paul Snow Stadium; Jacksonville, AL	W 24–14	12,500	
October 4	at Livingston	No. 8	Tiger Stadium; Livingston, AL	W 19–0	3,000	
October 11	at Tennessee Tech*	No. 7	Tucker Stadium; Cookeville, TN	W 7–3	8,000	
November 1	Delta State	No. 3	Paul Snow Stadium; Jacksonville, AL	W 36–3	12,000	
November 8	at Tennessee–Martin	No. 3	Pacer Stadium; Martin, TN	W 19–14	9,500	
November 15	No. 5 Troy State	No. 3	Paul Snow Stadium; Jacksonville, AL (rivalry)	W 13–8	13,000	
November 22	No. 5 North Alabama	No. 4	Paul Snow Stadium; Jacksonville, AL	L 28–35	13,300	
November 29	at No. 3 Cal Poly*	No. 4	Mustang Stadium; San Luis Obispo, CA (NCAA Division II Quarterfinal)	L 0–15	4,380	
*Non-conference game; Rankings from AP Poll released prior to the game
