= 1980 North Dakota Fighting Sioux football team =

American college football season

1980 North Dakota Fighting Sioux football
- Conference: North Central Conference
- Record: 6–4 (5–2 NCC)
- Head coach: Pat Behrns (1st season)
- Home stadium: Memorial Stadium

1980 North Central Conference football standings
	Conf.					Overall
Team	W		L		T	W		L		T
No. 10 Northern Colorado $^	6	–	1	–	0	7	–	4	–	0
Nebraska–Omaha	5	–	2	–	0	7	–	3	–	0
North Dakota	5	–	2	–	0	6	–	4	–	0
North Dakota State	5	–	2	–	0	6	–	4	–	0
South Dakota *	3	–	3	–	1	5	–	6	–	0
Augustana (SD)	2	–	5	–	0	2	–	7	–	1
South Dakota State *	1	–	5	–	1	3	–	8	–	0
Morningside	0	–	7	–	0	2	–	8	–	0
+ – Conference co-champions; ^ – NCAA Division II playoff participant; * – South Dakota and South Dakota State split two head-to-head games, which counted as a tie for each team in the conference standings.; Rankings from AP Poll

The 1980 North Dakota Fighting Sioux football team, also known as the Nodaks, was an American football team that represented the University of North Dakota in the North Central Conference (NCC) during the 1980 NCAA Division II football season.

== Schedule ==
Date	Opponent	Site	Result	Attendance	Source
September 6	at Portland State*	Civic Stadium; Portland, OR	L 14–28	11,952	
September 13	Montana State*	Memorial Stadium; Grand Forks, ND	W 14–6	10,000	
September 20	at Northern Colorado	Greeley, CO	L 22–27	1,587	
September 27	Augustana (SD)	Memorial Stadium; Grand Forks, ND	W 34–7	7,400	
October 4	North Dakota State	Memorial Stadium; Grand Forks, ND (Nickel Trophy)	W 34–20	14,500	
October 11	at South Dakota	DakotaDome; Vermillion, SD	L 24–32	9,200	
October 18	at Morningside	Roberts Field; Sioux City, IA	W 33–7	1,202	
October 25	No. 2 Nebraska–Omaha	Memorial Stadium; Grand Forks, ND	W 31–14	4,000	
November 1	South Dakota State	Memorial Stadium; Grand Forks, ND	W 47–13	4,100	
November 8	at Puget Sound*	Tacoma, WA	L 6–10	3,000	
*Non-conference game; Rankings from AP Poll released prior to the game

== Roster ==
1980 North Dakota Fighting Sioux football team roster
Players
Coaches
Offense

Pos.	#	Name	Class
RB	33	Jeff Abernathy	Fr
QB	42	Tom Biolo	Sr
OT	74	Todd Thomas	Sr
TE	86	Henry Jordan	Sr

Defense

Pos.	#	Name	Class
CB	13	Jim Abernathy	Jr

Special teams

Pos.	#	Name	Class

Head coach

- Pat Behrns

Coordinators/assistant coaches

Legend

- (C) Team captain
- (S) Suspended
- (I) Ineligible
- Injured
- Redshirt
