= 1980 South Dakota Coyotes football team =

American college football season

1980 South Dakota Coyotes football
- Conference: North Central Conference
- Record: 5–6 (3–3–1 NCC)
- Head coach: Dave Triplett (2nd season)
- Home stadium: DakotaDome

1980 North Central Conference football standings
	Conf.					Overall
Team	W		L		T	W		L		T
No. 10 Northern Colorado $^	6	–	1	–	0	7	–	4	–	0
Nebraska–Omaha	5	–	2	–	0	7	–	3	–	0
North Dakota	5	–	2	–	0	6	–	4	–	0
North Dakota State	5	–	2	–	0	6	–	4	–	0
South Dakota *	3	–	3	–	1	5	–	6	–	0
Augustana (SD)	2	–	5	–	0	2	–	7	–	1
South Dakota State *	1	–	5	–	1	3	–	8	–	0
Morningside	0	–	7	–	0	2	–	8	–	0
+ – Conference co-champions; ^ – NCAA Division II playoff participant; * – South Dakota and South Dakota State split two head-to-head games, which counted as a tie for each team in the conference standings.; Rankings from AP Poll

The 1980 South Dakota Coyotes football team represented the University of South Dakota as a member of the North Central Conference (NCC) during the 1980 NCAA Division II football season. Led by second-year head coach Dave Triplett, the Coyotes compiled an overall record of 5–6 with a mark of 3–3–1 in conference play, placing fifth in the NCC. South Dakota and South Dakota State split two head-to-head games, which counted as a tie for each team in the conference standings.

== Schedule ==
Date	Opponent	Site	Result	Attendance	Source
September 1	Morningside	DakotaDome; Vermillion, SD	W 19–14	8,000	
September 6	at Eastern Illinois*	O'Brien Stadium; Charleston, IL	L 21–34	6,500	
September 20	at Kansas State*	KSU Stadium; Manhattan, KS	L 3–20	26,120	
September 27	at South Dakota State	Coughlin–Alumni Stadium; Brookings, SD (rivalry)	L 13–21	7,501	
October 4	Augustana (SD)	DakotaDome; Vermillion, SD	W 20–10	7,500	
October 11	North Dakota	DakotaDome; Vermillion, SD (Sitting Bull Trophy)	W 32–23	9,200	
October 18	at Nebraska–Omaha	Al F. Caniglia Field; Omaha, NE	L 7–18	10,000	
October 25	Northern Colorado	DakotaDome; Vermillion, SD	L 0–40	6,800	
November 1	at North Dakota State	Dacotah Field; Fargo, ND	L 7–49	3,500	
November 8	South Dakota State	DakotaDome; Vermillion, SD	W 16–7	10,000	
November 15	at Northern Iowa*	UNI-Dome; Cedar Falls, IA	W 16–14	12,929	
*Non-conference game
