= 1980 Cal Poly Mustangs football team =

American college football season

1980 Cal Poly Mustangs football

NCAA Division II champion CCAA champion

NCAA Division II Championship Game—Zia Bowl, W 21–13 vs. Eastern Illinois
- Conference: California Collegiate Athletic Association

Ranking
- AP: No. 3 (NCAA Division II)
- Record: 10–3 (2–0 CCAA)
- Head coach: Joe Harper (13th season)
- Home stadium: Mustang Stadium

1980 California Collegiate Athletic Association football standings
	Conf.					Overall
Team	W		L		T	W		L		T
No. 3 Cal Poly $^	2	–	0	–	0	10	–	3	–	0
Cal State Northridge	1	–	1	–	0	5	–	6	–	0
Cal Poly Pomona	0	–	2	–	0	3	–	7	–	0
$ – Conference champion; ^ – NCAA Division II playoff participant; Rankings from Associated Press poll

The 1980 Cal Poly Mustangs football team represented California Polytechnic State University, San Luis Obispo as a member of the California Collegiate Athletic Association (CCAA) during the 1980 NCAA Division II football season. Led by 13th-year head coach Joe Harper, Cal Poly compiled an overall record of 10–3 with a mark of 2–0 in conference play, winning the CCAA title for the fifth consecutive season. The Mustangs advanced to the NCAA Division II Football Championship playoffs, where they shut out Jacksonville State in the quarterfinals, beat Santa Clara in the semifinals, and upset No. 1-ranked Eastern Illinois in the title game, the Zia Bowl played in Albuquerque, New Mexico. During the regular season, two of the Mustangs three losses came at the hands of NCAA Division I-A opponents, Cal State Fullerton and Fresno State. Cal Poly also beat Boise State, the eventual NCAA Division I-AA champion. The Mustangs played home games at Mustang Stadium in San Luis Obispo, California.

== Schedule ==
Date	Opponent	Rank	Site	Result	Attendance	Source
September 13	at Northern Colorado*		Jackson Field; Greeley, CO	W 17–16	1,309	
September 20	Cal State Fullerton*		Mustang Stadium; San Luis Obispo, CA	L 23–30	7,160	
September 27	at UC Davis*		Toomey Field; Davis, California (rivalry)	W 28–25	8,900–9,000	
October 4	at Fresno State*		Ratcliffe Stadium; Fresno, California	L 25–31	15,221	
October 11	at No. 5 Santa Clara*	No. 10	Buck Shaw Stadium; Santa Clara, CA	W 42–28	7,200	
October 25	Puget Sound*	No. 7	Mustang Stadium; San Luis Obispo, CA	W 24–0	6,080	
November 1	Cal State Northridge	No. 5	Mustang Stadium; San Luis Obispo, CA	W 35–6	8,170	
November 8	at Cal Poly Pomona	No. 4	Claremont Alumni Field; Claremont, CA	W 36–0	4,781	
November 15	No. 5 (I-AA) Boise State*	No. 4	Mustang Stadium; San Luis Obispo, CA	W 23–20	8,330	
November 22	Sacramento State*	No. 3	Mustang Stadium; San Luis Obispo, CA	L 19–24	5,470	
November 29	No. 4 Jacksonville State*	No. 3	Mustang Stadium; San Luis Obispo, CA (NCAA Division II Quarterfinal)	W 15–0	4,380	
December 6	No. 7 Santa Clara*	No. 3	Mustang Stadium; San Luis Obispo, CA (NCAA Division II Semifinal)	W 38–14	6,650	
December 13	No. 1 Eastern Illinois*	No. 3	University Stadium; Albuquerque, NM (Zia Bowl—NCAA Division II Championship Game)	W 21–13	2,056	
*Non-conference game; Rankings from Associated Press Poll released prior to the game

== Team players in the NFL ==
The following Cal Poly Mustang players were selected in the 1981 NFL draft.

Player	Position	Round	Overall	NFL team
Robbie Martin	Wide receiver	4	100	Pittsburgh Steelers
Louis Jackson	Running back	7	168	New York Giants
Mike Daum	Tackle	7	179	Miami Dolphins

The following finished their college career in 1980, were not drafted, but played in the NFL.

Player	Position	First NFL team
LeCharls McDaniel	Defensive back	1981 Washington Redskins
Mel Kaufman	Linebacker	1981 Washington Redskins
