= 1980 NCAA Division II football season =

American college football season

- Regular season: August – November 1980
- Playoffs: December 1980
- National Championship: Zia Bowl; University Stadium; Albuquerque, NM
- Champion: Cal Poly

The 1980 NCAA Division II football season, part of college football in the United States organized by the National Collegiate Athletic Association at the Division II level, began in August 1980, and concluded with the NCAA Division II Football Championship in December 1980 at University Stadium in Albuquerque, NM. During the game's two-year stretch in New Mexico, it was referred to as the Zia Bowl.

Cal Poly defeated Eastern Illinois in the championship game, 21–13, to win their first Division II national title.

== Conference changes and new programs ==
- Prior to the season, four Division II programs moved Division I-AA, and two Division I-AA programs moved to Division II.
- The Pennsylvania State Athletic Conference reclassified as a Division II conference; all 13 PSAC members made the transition.

School	1979 Conference	1980 Conference
Akron	AMCU	OVC (I-AA)
Bethune-Cookman	SIAC	MEAC (I-AA)
Delaware	Independent	I-AA Independent
James Madison	Independent	I-AA Independent
Michigan Tech	NIC	GLIAC
Morgan State	MEAC (I-AA)	Independent
Nicholls State	Independent	I-AA Independent
North Carolina Central	MEAC (I-AA)	CIAA (II)
Northern State	Independent (NAIA)	NIC
Southeastern Louisiana	Independent	I-AA Independent
United States International	Independent	Dropped Program

== Conference standings ==
1980 Association of Mid-Continent Universities football standings
	Conf.					Overall
Team	W		L		T	W		L		T
Eastern Illinois $^	4	–	0	–	0	11	–	3	–	0
Northern Michigan ^	3	–	1	–	0	9	–	2	–	0
Northern Iowa	2	–	2	–	0	7	–	4	–	0
Youngstown State	1	–	3	–	0	2	–	8	–	1
Western Illinois	0	–	4	–	0	4	–	6	–	0
$ – Conference champion; ^ – NCAA Division II playoff participant

1980 California Collegiate Athletic Association football standings
	Conf.					Overall
Team	W		L		T	W		L		T
No. 3 Cal Poly $^	2	–	0	–	0	10	–	3	–	0
Cal State Northridge	1	–	1	–	0	5	–	6	–	0
Cal Poly Pomona	0	–	2	–	0	3	–	7	–	0
$ – Conference champion; ^ – NCAA Division II playoff participant; Rankings from Associated Press poll

1980 Central Intercollegiate Athletic Association football standings
	Conf.					Overall
Team	W		L		T	W		L		T
North Carolina Central $	7	–	0	–	0	7	–	5	–	0
No. 6 Virginia Union ^	5	–	1	–	1	9	–	2	–	1
Elizabeth City State	5	–	2	–	0	7	–	2	–	1
Winston-Salem State	5	–	2	–	0	5	–	5	–	0
Saint Paul's (VA)	4	–	3	–	0	4	–	6	–	0
Norfolk State	3	–	3	–	1	5	–	4	–	1
Hampton	3	–	4	–	0	5	–	6	–	0
Johnson C. Smith	3	–	5	–	0	3	–	7	–	0
Fayetteville State	2	–	5	–	0	4	–	5	–	0
Virginia State	2	–	5	–	0	3	–	8	–	0
Bowie State	1	–	5	–	0	2	–	8	–	1
Livingstone	0	–	7	–	0	0	–	10	–	0
$ – Conference champion; ^ – NCAA Division II playoff participant; Rankings from NCAA Division II AP Poll

1980 Far Western Conference football standings
	Conf.					Overall
Team	W		L		T	W		L		T
UC Davis $	5	–	0	–	0	7	–	2	–	1
Cal State Hayward	3	–	2	–	0	6	–	4	–	0
Chico State	3	–	2	–	0	5	–	5	–	0
San Francisco State	2	–	3	–	0	3	–	6	–	1
Sacramento State	1	–	4	–	0	3	–	7	–	0
Humboldt State	1	–	4	–	0	2	–	8	–	0
$ – Conference champion

1980 Great Lakes Intercollegiate Athletic Conference football standings
	Conf.					Overall
Team	W		L		T	W		L		T
No. 20 Hillsdale $	5	–	1	–	0	7	–	4	–	0
Northwood	4	–	2	–	0	6	–	2	–	1
No. 18 Grand Valley State	4	–	2	–	0	7	–	3	–	0
Wayne State (MI)	3	–	3	–	0	5	–	4	–	0
Ferris State	2	–	3	–	1	4	–	4	–	2
Saginaw Valley State	2	–	4	–	0	5	–	6	–	0
Michigan Tech	0	–	5	–	1	2	–	6	–	1
$ – Conference champion; Rankings from NAIA Division I poll

1980 Gulf South Conference football standings
	Conf.					Overall
Team	W		L		T	W		L		T
No. 5 North Alabama $^	6	–	0	–	0	10	–	2	–	0
No. 4 Jacksonville State ^	6	–	1	–	0	8	–	2	–	0
Troy State	4	–	2	–	0	8	–	2	–	0
Livingston	2	–	4	–	0	5	–	5	–	0
Mississippi College	2	–	4	–	0	4	–	5	–	0
Tennessee–Martin	2	–	4	–	0	4	–	7	–	0
Delta State	0	–	6	–	0	3	–	8	–	0
$ – Conference champion; ^ – NCAA Division II playoff participant; Rankings from AP Poll

1980 Heartland Collegiate Conference standings
	Conf.					Overall
Team	W		L		T	W		L		T
Franklin (IN) +	5	–	2	–	0	8	–	2	–	0
Ashland +	5	–	2	–	0	6	–	3	–	1
Saint Joseph's (IN)	4	–	3	–	0	6	–	4	–	0
Indiana Central	3	–	3	–	1	5	–	4	–	2
Georgetown (KY)	3	–	4	–	0	4	–	5	–	0
Butler	3	–	4	–	0	4	–	6	–	0
Evansville	3	–	4	–	0	3	–	7	–	0
Valparaiso	1	–	5	–	1	3	–	6	–	1
+ – Conference co-champions

1980 Missouri Intercollegiate Athletic Association football standings
	Conf.					Overall
Team	W		L		T	W		L		T
Missouri–Rolla $	6	–	0	–	0	10	–	0	–	0
SW Missouri State	5	–	1	–	0	6	–	5	–	0
Central Missouri	3	–	3	–	0	6	–	3	–	1
NE Missouri State	3	–	3	–	0	5	–	6	–	0
SE Missouri State	3	–	3	–	0	4	–	7	–	0
NW Missouri State	1	–	5	–	0	2	–	8	–	0
Lincoln (MO)	0	–	6	–	0	2	–	9	–	0
$ – Conference champion

1980 North Central Conference football standings
	Conf.					Overall
Team	W		L		T	W		L		T
No. 10 Northern Colorado $^	6	–	1	–	0	7	–	4	–	0
Nebraska–Omaha	5	–	2	–	0	7	–	3	–	0
North Dakota	5	–	2	–	0	6	–	4	–	0
North Dakota State	5	–	2	–	0	6	–	4	–	0
South Dakota *	3	–	3	–	1	5	–	6	–	0
Augustana (SD)	2	–	5	–	0	2	–	7	–	1
South Dakota State *	1	–	5	–	1	3	–	8	–	0
Morningside	0	–	7	–	0	2	–	8	–	0
+ – Conference co-champions; ^ – NCAA Division II playoff participant; * – South Dakota and South Dakota State split two head-to-head games, which counted as a tie for each team in the conference standings.; Rankings from AP Poll

1980 Northern Intercollegiate Conference football standings
	Conf.					Overall
Team	W		L		T	W		L		T
Minnesota Duluth $	8	–	0	–	0	10	–	0	–	0
Minnesota Morris ^	7	–	1	–	0	9	–	2	–	1
No. 11 Moorhead State	6	–	2	–	0	8	–	2	–	0
St. Cloud State	5	–	3	–	0	6	–	4	–	0
Mankato State	3	–	5	–	0	3	–	7	–	0
Southwest State (MN)	2	–	5	–	1	3	–	6	–	1
Winona State	2	–	6	–	0	3	–	7	–	0
Northern State	1	–	6	–	1	2	–	7	–	1
Bemidji State	1	–	7	–	0	1	–	9	–	0
$ – Conference champion; ^ – NCAA Division III playoff participant; Rankings from NAIA Division I poll

1980 Pennsylvania State Athletic Conference football standings
	Conf.					Overall
Team	W		L		T	W		L		T
East Division
Millersville x	4	–	1	–	0	6	–	2	–	1
East Stroudsburg x	4	–	1	–	0	6	–	4	–	0
Kutztown xy	4	–	1	–	0	6	–	5	–	0
Cheyney	1	–	4	–	0	4	–	5	–	1
Mansfield	1	–	4	–	0	2	–	7	–	0
Bloomsburg	1	–	4	–	0	1	–	8	–	0
West Division
Clarion xy$	5	–	1	–	0	9	–	2	–	0
Edinboro	3	–	2	–	1	6	–	2	–	1
Shippensburg	3	–	2	–	1	5	–	4	–	1
Indiana (PA)	3	–	3	–	0	6	–	4	–	0
Slippery Rock	3	–	3	–	0	4	–	5	–	0
Lock Haven	2	–	4	–	0	5	–	5	–	0
California (PA)	1	–	5	–	0	2	–	8	–	0
Championship: Clarion 15, Kutztown 14
$ – Conference champion; x – Division champion/co-champions; y – Championship game participant

1980 Southern Intercollegiate Athletic Conference football standings
	Conf.					Overall
Team	W		L		T	W		L		T
Division II
Morris Brown*	5	–	0	–	1	6	–	3	–	1
Alabama A&M x	3	–	1	–	1	5	–	4	–	1
Tuskegee	4	–	1	–	0	4	–	6	–	0
Albany State	4	–	3	–	0	4	–	7	–	0
Morehouse	2	–	7	–	0	2	–	7	–	0
Division III
Fort Valley State x	5	–	4	–	1	6	–	4	–	1
Savannah State	4	–	3	–	0	6	–	4	–	0
Miles	2	–	3	–	1	4	–	4	–	2
Knoxville	3	–	4	–	0	4	–	5	–	0
Clark	3	–	2	–	0	3	–	4	–	0
Lane	3	–	3	–	0	3	–	5	–	0
Fisk	0	–	7	–	0	0	–	8	–	0
x – Division champion/co-champions; * – Morris Brown was stripped of their division title for using ineligible players. Alabama A&M is recognized as the Division II champion by the SIAC

1980 West Virginia Intercollegiate Athletic Conference football standings
	Conf.					Overall
Team	W		L		T	W		L		T
Northern Division
No. 19 Shepherd xy	6	–	2	–	1	7	–	3	–	1
Fairmont State x	6	–	2	–	1	6	–	3	–	1
Salem	6	–	3	–	0	6	–	4	–	0
West Virginia Wesleyan	3	–	6	–	0	3	–	7	–	0
West Liberty State	0	–	9	–	0	0	–	10	–	0
Southern Division
No. 3 Concord xy$^	9	–	0	–	0	11	–	1	–	0
West Virginia State	6	–	3	–	0	6	–	4	–	0
West Virginia Tech	5	–	4	–	0	5	–	4	–	0
Bluefield State	1	–	7	–	1	1	–	7	–	1
Glenville State	1	–	7	–	1	1	–	8	–	1
Championship: Concord 19, Shepherd 0
$ – Conference champion; x – Division champion/co-champions; y – Championship game participant; ^ – NAIA Division I playoff participant; Rankings from NAIA Division I poll

1980 NCAA Division II independents football records
	Conf.			Overall
Team	W	L	T	W		L		T
No. 9 American International		–		8	–	2	–	0
No. 7 Santa Clara ^		–		9	–	3	–	0
Springfield		–		7	–	2	–	0
Eastern Washington		–		6	–	4	–	0
Alabama State		–		6	–	5	–	0
Southern Connecticut State		–		5	–	4	–	0
West Chester		–		5	–	4	–	1
Towson State		–		5	–	5	–	0
C.W. Post		–		5	–	5	–	0
Arkansas–Pine Bluff		–		5	–	6	–	0
Kentucky State		–		5	–	6	–	0
Central State (OH)		–		4	–	6	–	1
Morgan State		–		4	–	7	–	0
Central Connecticut		–		3	–	7	–	0
^ – NCAA Division II playoff participant; Rankings from Associated Press poll

== Conference summaries ==
Conference	Champion(s)
Association of Mid-Continent Universities	Eastern Illinois
California Collegiate Athletic Association	Cal Poly
Central Intercollegiate Athletic Association	North Carolina Central
Far Western Football Conference	UC Davis
Great Lakes Intercollegiate Athletic Conference	Hillsdale
Gulf South Conference	North Alabama
Heartland Collegiate Conference	Franklin and Ashland
Missouri Intercollegiate Athletic Association	Missouri–Rolla
North Central Conference	Northern Colorado
Southern Intercollegiate Athletic Conference	Morris Brown (Vacated) Alabama A&M

== Postseason ==
1980 NCAA Division II Football Championship
- Teams: 8
- Finals Site: University Stadium; Albuquerque, NM
- Champion: Cal Poly; (1st title, 1st title game)
- Runner-up: Eastern Illinois; (2nd title game)
- Semifinalists: North Alabama; Santa Clara
- Winning coach: Joe Harper; 1st championship

The 1980 NCAA Division II Football Championship playoffs were the eighth single-elimination tournament to determine the national champion of men's NCAA Division II college football. The championship game was held at University Stadium in Albuquerque, NM for the second, and final, time.

=== Playoff bracket ===
First round Campus sites
Eastern Illinois	21
Northern Colorado	14
North Alabama	17
Virginia Union	8
Santa Clara	27
Northern Michigan	26
Cal Poly	15
Jacksonville State	0

Semifinals; Campus sites
Eastern Illinois	56
North Alabama	31
Santa Clara	14
Cal Poly	38

Championship; University Stadium; Albuquerque, NM
Eastern Illinois	13
Cal Poly	21

== See also ==
- 1980 NCAA Division I-A football season
- 1980 NCAA Division I-AA football season
- 1980 NCAA Division III football season
- 1980 NAIA Division I football season
- 1980 NAIA Division II football season
