= 1980 Chico State Wildcats football team =

American college football season

1980 Chico State Wildcats football
- Conference: Far Western Conference
- Record: 5–5 (3–2 FWC)
- Head coach: Dick Trimmer (7th season)
- Defensive coordinator: Mike Clemons (2nd season)
- Home stadium: University Stadium

1980 Far Western Conference football standings
	Conf.					Overall
Team	W		L		T	W		L		T
UC Davis $	5	–	0	–	0	7	–	2	–	1
Cal State Hayward	3	–	2	–	0	6	–	4	–	0
Chico State	3	–	2	–	0	5	–	5	–	0
San Francisco State	2	–	3	–	0	3	–	6	–	1
Sacramento State	1	–	4	–	0	3	–	7	–	0
Humboldt State	1	–	4	–	0	2	–	8	–	0
$ – Conference champion

The 1980 Chico State Wildcats football team represented California State University, Chico as a member of the Far Western Conference (FWC) during the 1980 NCAA Division II football season. Led by seventh-year head coach Dick Trimmer, Chico State compiled an overall record of 5–5 with a mark of 3–2 in conference play, tying for second place in the FWC. The team was outscored by its opponents 203 to 181 for the season. The Wildcats played home games at University Stadium in Chico, California.

== Schedule ==
Date	Opponent	Site	Result	Attendance	Source
September 6	Puget Sound*	University Stadium; Chico, CA	L 0–37	5,852	
September 13	Saint Mary's*	University Stadium; Chico, CA	W 37–21	1,950	
September 20	at Cal Lutheran*	Mt. Clef Field; Thousand Oaks, CA	L 3–6	1,000	
September 27	at Santa Clara*	Buck Shaw Stadium; Santa Clara, CA	L 10–17	5,419	
October 11	Cal State Northridge*	University Stadium; Chico, CA	W 39–12	300–1,100	
October 18	Cal State Hayward	University Stadium; Chico, CA	L 17–35	3,600	
October 25	at Sacramento State	Hornet Stadium; Sacramento, CA	W 24–22	5,100	
November 1	at Humboldt State	Redwood Bowl; Arcata, CA	W 21–15		
November 8	UC Davis	University Stadium; Chico, CA	L 4–35	4,542	
November 15	at San Francisco State	Cox Stadium; San Francisco, CA	W 26–3	1,774	
*Non-conference game
