= 1980 Sonoma State Cossacks football team =

American college football season

1980 Sonoma State Cossacks football
- Conference: Independent
- Record: 6–4
- Head coach: Milt Cerf (1st season)
- Home stadium: Cossacks Stadium

1980 NCAA Division III independents football records
	Conf.			Overall
Team	W	L	T	W		L		T
Dayton ^		–		14	–	0	–	0
Millsaps		–		9	–	0	–	0
Wabash		–		8	–	0	–	1
Hofstra		–		8	–	2	–	0
Wagner ^		–		8	–	2	–	0
DePauw		–		7	–	2	–	1
Salisbury State		–		7	–	3	–	1
Catholic University		–		6	–	3	–	0
WPI		–		5	–	3	–	0
Canisius		–		5	–	4	–	0
Brockport		–		5	–	4	–	1
Buffalo		–		6	–	5	–	0
Albany		–		5	–	5	–	0
Georgetown		–		4	–	4	–	0
San Diego		–		5	–	5	–	0
UCF		–		4	–	4	–	1
Saint Mary's		–		5	–	6	–	0
Duquesne		–		4	–	5	–	0
Frostburg State		–		4	–	5	–	0
Grove City		–		4	–	5	–	0
Norwich		–		4	–	6	–	0
Rochester (NY)		–		3	–	5	–	1
St. Norbert		–		3	–	6	–	0
Cortland		–		3	–	7	–	0
Colorado College		–		2	–	7	–	0
Saint Francis (PA)		–		2	–	7	–	0
Union (NY)		–		1	–	7	–	0
Fordham		–		0	–	9	–	0
Merchant Marine		–		0	–	11	–	0
^ – NCAA Division III playoff participant

The 1980 Sonoma State Cossacks football team represented Sonoma State University as an independent during the 1980 NCAA Division III football season. This was the first year Sonoma State played intercollegiate football since they discontinued the program after the 1971 season. The team was led by head coach Milt Cerf. Cerf was an insurance broker, who had agreed to fund the program himself in 1979. Cerf led the 1979 "club" team to a 3–3 record against junior colleges and freshmen teams.

The 1980 Cossacks were again a club team. Sonoma State finished the season with a record of 6–4. The team outscored its opponents 275 to 195 for the season. The Cossacks played home games at Cossacks Stadium (Note: Cossacks Stadium was renamed in 2002 to Seawolf Stadium when the University changed the name of the mascot to Seawolves.) in Rohnert Park, California.

== Schedule ==
Date	Time	Opponent	Site	Result	Attendance	Source
September 6	1:30 p.m.	Chapman	Cossacks Stadium; Rohnert Park, CA	W 38–0	3,000	
September 13	1:30 p.m.	at Pomona-Pitzer	Claremont Alumni Field; Claremont, CA	W 28–6		
September 20	1:30 p.m.	Redlands	Cossacks Stadium; Rohnert Park, CA	W 21–14	3,000	
September 27	1:30 p.m.	at Cal State Northridge	North Campus Stadium; Northridge, CA	L 24–35	300–500	
October 4	1:30 p.m.	La Verne	Cossacks Stadium; Rohnert Park, CA	W 21–0		
October 11	1:30 p.m.	at Occidental	D. W. Patterson Field; Los Angeles, CA	W 45–14	800	
October 18	1:30 p.m.	Saint Mary's^{†}	Cossacks Stadium; Rohnert Park, CA	L 21–44	1,300	
October 25	7:30 p.m.	at Humboldt State	Albee Stadium; Eureka, CA	W 49–20		
November 11	2:30 p.m.	at San Diego	Torero Stadium; San Diego, CA	L 7–14		
November 8	1:30 p.m.	Azusa Pacific	Cossacks Stadium; Rohnert Park, CA	L 21–48		
^{†}Homecoming; All times are in Pacific time
