= Joe Harper (American football) =

American football player and coach

Biographical details
- Born: c. 1936 (age 89–90)

Playing career
- 1956–1958: UCLA
- Position: Guard

Coaching career (HC unless noted)
- 1959: UCLA (assistant freshmen)
- 1960: Riverside
- 1961: Colorado State (line)
- 1962: UC Santa Barbara (line)
- 1963–1967: Colorado (OL)
- 1968–1981: Cal Poly
- 1982–1984: Northern Arizona
- 1990–1995: Cal Lutheran
- 2011–2017: Cal Poly (off. analyst)

Administrative career (AD unless noted)
- 1968–1973: Cal Poly

Head coaching record
- Overall: 131–95–4 (college); 7–3 (junior college)
- Bowls: 0–1 (junior college)
- Tournaments: 3–1 (NCAA D-II playoffs)

Accomplishments and honors

Championships
- 1 NCAA Division II (1980); 1 Eastern Conference (1960); 10 CCAA (1969–1973, 1976–1980)

Joe Harper (born c. 1936) is an American former college football coach and former player. Harper served as the head football coach at Cal Poly from 1968 to 1981, at Northern Arizona University from 1982 to 1984, and at California Lutheran University from 1990 to 1995, compiling a career coaching record of 131–95–4. He led the 1980 Cal Poly Mustangs football team to the NCAA Division II Football Championship. Harper rejoined the Cal Poly Mustangs football program in 2011.

A native of Glendale, California, Harper attended the University of California, Los Angeles (UCLA), where he lettered in football for three seasons, from 1956 to 1958. He was co-captain of the 1957 UCLA Bruins football team. Harper graduated from UCLA in 1959 and spent one season coaching at his alma mater, as an assistant for the freshmen football team. He spent the 1960 season as head football coach at Riverside City College in Riverside, California before serving as line coach at Colorado State University in 1961 and the University of California, Santa Barbara in 1962. From 1963 to 1967 Harper worked as an offensive line coach at the University of Colorado Boulder under Eddie Crowder. Harper was hired as the head football coach at Cal Poly in February 1968. That July he was appointed as the school's athletic director.

== Head coaching record ==
=== College ===
Year	Team	Overall	Conference	Standing	Bowl/playoffs	UPI^{#}
Cal Poly Mustangs (California Collegiate Athletic Association) (1968–1981)
1968	Cal Poly	7–3	2–2	T–2nd		
1969	Cal Poly	6–4	2–0	1st		
1970	Cal Poly	8–2	3–0	1st		
1971	Cal Poly	6–5	3–0	1st		
1972	Cal Poly	8–1–1	3–0	1st	L Camellia	3
1973	Cal Poly	9–1	4–0	1st		9
1974	Cal Poly	5–4–1	2–1–1	2nd		
1975	Cal Poly	6–4	3–1	2nd		
1976	Cal Poly	7–1–1	2–0	1st		
1977	Cal Poly	8–2	3–0	1st		
1978	Cal Poly	7–3	2–0	1st	L NCAA Division II Quarterfinal	
1979	Cal Poly	7–3	2–0	1st		
1980	Cal Poly	10–3	2–0	1st	W NCAA Division II Championship	
1981	Cal Poly	4–5	0–2	3rd		
Cal Poly:		96–43–3	33–6–1			
Northern Arizona Lumberjacks (Big Sky Conference) (1982–1984)
1982	Northern Arizona	4–7	3–4	T–5th		
1983	Northern Arizona	4–7	2–5	7th		
1984	Northern Arizona	4–6	2–5	7th		
Northern Arizona:		12–20	7–14			
Cal Lutheran Kingsmen (NCAA Division II independent) (1990)
1990	Cal Lutheran	2–8				
Cal Lutheran Kingsmen (Southern California Intercollegiate Athletic Conference) (1991–1995)
1991	Cal Lutheran	5–5	NA	NA		
1992	Cal Lutheran	3–6	2–4	T–5th		
1993	Cal Lutheran	5–4	3–3	T–3rd		
1994	Cal Lutheran	4–5	3–3	4th		
1995	Cal Lutheran	4–4–1	4–2	T–2nd		
Cal Lutheran:		23–32–1				
Total:		131–95–4				
National championship Conference title Conference division title or championship game berth

=== Junior college football ===
Year	Team	Overall	Conference	Standing	Bowl/playoffs
Riverside Tigers (Eastern Conference) (1960)
1960	Riverside	7–3	6–1	1st	L Orange Show Bowl
Riverside:		7–3	6–1		
Total:		7–3			
National championship Conference title Conference division title or championship game berth
