= 1980 Humboldt State Lumberjacks football team =

American college football season

1980 Humboldt State Lumberjacks football
- Conference: Far Western Conference
- Record: 2–8 (1–4 FWC)
- Head coach: Bud Van Deren (15th season)
- Home stadium: Redwood Bowl

1980 Far Western Conference football standings
	Conf.					Overall
Team	W		L		T	W		L		T
UC Davis $	5	–	0	–	0	7	–	2	–	1
Cal State Hayward	3	–	2	–	0	6	–	4	–	0
Chico State	3	–	2	–	0	5	–	5	–	0
San Francisco State	2	–	3	–	0	3	–	6	–	1
Sacramento State	1	–	4	–	0	3	–	7	–	0
Humboldt State	1	–	4	–	0	2	–	8	–	0
$ – Conference champion

The 1980 Humboldt State Lumberjacks football team represented Humboldt State University—now known as California State Polytechnic University, Humboldt—as a member of the Far Western Conference (FWC) during the 1980 NCAA Division II football season. Led by 15th-year head coach Bud Van Deren, the Lumberjacks compiled an overall record of 2–8 with a mark of 1–4 in conference play, tying for fifth place in the FWC. The team was outscored by its opponents 261 to 147 for the season. Humboldt State played home games at the Redwood Bowl in Arcata, California.

== Schedule ==
Date	Time	Opponent	Site	Result	Attendance	Source
September 13		at Santa Clara*	Buck Shaw Stadium; Santa Clara, CA	L 14–41		
September 20		at Puget Sound*	Baker Stadium; Tacoma, WA	L 7–17		
September 27		Pacific Lutheran*	Redwood Bowl; Arcata, CA	L 14–45		
October 4		at Redlands*	Redlands Stadium; Redlands, CA	W 14–7		
October 11		at UC Davis	Toomey Field; Davis, CA	L 17–20	8,100	
October 18		San Francisco State	Redwood Bowl; Arcata, CA	L 6–21	2,137	
October 25	7:30 p.m.	Sonoma State*	Redwood Bowl; Arcata, CA	L 20–49		
November 1		Chico State	Redwood Bowl; Arcata, CA	L 15–21		
November 8		Cal State Hayward	Redwood Bowl; Arcata, CA	W 23–6	980	
November 15		at Sacramento State	Hornet Stadium; Sacramento, CA	L 17–34	2,700	
*Non-conference game; All times are in Pacific time
