= 1980 San Francisco State Gators football team =

American college football season

1980 San Francisco State Gators football
- Conference: Far Western Conference
- Record: 3–6–1 (2–3 FWC)
- Head coach: Vic Rowen (20th season)
- Home stadium: Cox Stadium

1980 Far Western Conference football standings
| | Conf. | | | | | Overall |
| Team | W | | L | | T | W | | L | | T |
|---|---|---|---|---|---|---|---|---|---|---|
| UC Davis $ | 5 | – | 0 | – | 0 | 7 | – | 2 | – | 1 |
| Cal State Hayward | 3 | – | 2 | – | 0 | 6 | – | 4 | – | 0 |
| Chico State | 3 | – | 2 | – | 0 | 5 | – | 5 | – | 0 |
| San Francisco State | 2 | – | 3 | – | 0 | 3 | – | 6 | – | 1 |
| Sacramento State | 1 | – | 4 | – | 0 | 3 | – | 7 | – | 0 |
| Humboldt State | 1 | – | 4 | – | 0 | 2 | – | 8 | – | 0 |
$ – Conference champion

The 1980 San Francisco State Gators football team represented San Francisco State University as a member of the Far Western Conference (FWC) during the 1980 NCAA Division II football season. Led by 20th-year head coach Vic Rowen, San Francisco State compiled an overall record of 3–6–1 with a mark of 2–4 in conference play, placing fourth in the FWC. For the season the team was outscored by its opponents 201 to 169. The Gators played home games at Cox Stadium in San Francisco.

== Schedule ==
| Date | Opponent | Site | Result | Attendance | Source |
|---|---|---|---|---|---|
| September 6 | Cal State Northridge* | Cox Stadium; San Francisco, CA | L 10–13 | 1,065 | |
| September 13 | at Cal Lutheran* | Mt. Clef Field; Thousand Oaks, CA | T 10–10 | 1,502–3,000 | |
| September 27 | Cal Poly Pomona* | Cox Stadium; San Francisco, CA | L 17–20 | 1,327 | |
| October 4 | at Cal State Hayward | Pioneer Stadium; Hayward, CA | L 7–21 | 1,032–1,235 | |
| October 11 | Sacramento State | Cox Stadium; San Francisco, CA | W 19–0 | 1,413 | |
| October 18 | at Humboldt State | Redwood Bowl; Arcata, CA | W 21–6 | 2,137 | |
| October 25 | UC Davis | Cox Stadium; San Francisco, CA | L 32–48 | 3,414–3,416 | |
| November 1 | at Saint Mary's* | Saint Mary's Stadium; Moraga, CA | W 30–23 | 1,500 | |
| November 8 | Santa Clara* | Cox Stadium; San Francisco, CA | L 20–34 | 3,212 | |
| November 15 | Chico State | Cox Stadium; San Francisco, CA | L 3–26 | 1,774 | |
*Non-conference game
