= 1980 Northern Iowa Panthers football team =

American college football season

1980 Northern Iowa Panthers football
- Conference: Association of Mid-Continent Universities
- Record: 7–4 (2–2 Mid-Con)
- Head coach: Stan Sheriff (21st season)
- Defensive coordinator: Dennis Remmert (10th season)
- Home stadium: UNI-Dome

1980 Association of Mid-Continent Universities football standings
	Conf.					Overall
Team	W		L		T	W		L		T
Eastern Illinois $^	4	–	0	–	0	11	–	3	–	0
Northern Michigan ^	3	–	1	–	0	9	–	2	–	0
Northern Iowa	2	–	2	–	0	7	–	4	–	0
Youngstown State	1	–	3	–	0	2	–	8	–	1
Western Illinois	0	–	4	–	0	4	–	6	–	0
$ – Conference champion; ^ – NCAA Division II playoff participant

The 1980 Northern Iowa Panthers football team was an American football team that represented the University of Northern Iowa as a member of the Association of Mid-Continent Universities (Mid-Con) during the 1980 NCAA Division II football season. In its 21st season under head coach Stan Sheriff, the team compiled a 7–4 record (2–2 in conference games) and finished in third place out five teams in the Mid-Con. The Panthers scored 63 points, and gained 726 yards of total offense, against Evansville; it was the highest point total ever scored by a Northern Iowa team. It was Northern Iowa's final year as a NCAA Division II team.

The team's statistical leaders included junior quarterback Steve Sandon (2,761 passing yards), freshman tailback Chris Miliner (899 rushing yards), junior split end Ken Harvey (935 receiving yards), and sophomore kicker Steve Schonert (77 points scored). Three Northern Iowa players received first-team honors on the 1980 all-Mid-Con football team: Schonert; defensive tackle Owen Dockter; and strong safety Danny Todd. Eight others were named to the second team.

The team played its home games at the UNI-Dome in Cedar Falls, Iowa.

== Schedule ==
Date	Opponent	Rank	Site	Result	Attendance	Source
September 6	at Nebraska–Omaha*		Al F. Caniglia Field; Omaha, NE	L 6–32	9,200	
September 13	Weber State*		UNI-Dome; Cedar Falls, IA	W 31–10	12,158	
September 27	Arkansas Tech*		UNI-Dome; Cedar Falls, IA	W 49–10	10,829	
October 4	at No. 1 Northern Michigan		Marquette, MI	L 16–20	5,610	
October 11	Western Illinois		UNI-Dome; Cedar Falls, IA	W 35–28	8,310	
October 18	Southeast Missouri State*		UNI-Dome; Cedar Falls, IA	W 30–7	6,421	
October 25	Southwest Missouri State*		UNI-Dome; Cedar Falls, IA	W 41–0	13,111	
November 1	at Youngstown State		Youngstown, OH	W 38–17	3,352	
November 8	at No. 1 Eastern Illinois	No. T–9	O'Brien Field; Charleston, IL	L 9–14	12,600	
November 15	South Dakota*		UNI-Dome; Cedar Falls, IA	L 14–16	12,929	
November 22	Evansville*		UNI-Dome; Cedar Falls, IA	W 63–33	5,928	
*Non-conference game; Rankings from AP Poll released prior to the game

== Roster ==
1980 Northern Iowa Panthers football team roster
Players
Coaches
Offense

Pos.	#	Name	Class
QB	7	Dave Chambers	So
RB	23	Steve Donaldson	So
QB	10	Larry Miller	Fr
WR	9	Kelson Roby	Sr
QB	12	Steve Sandon	Sr
C	74	Kevin Webster	So
TE	80	Steve Wright	Sr

Defense

Pos.	#	Name	Class
DT	75	Owen Dockter	Sr

Special teams

Pos.	#	Name	Class

Head coach

- Stan Sheriff

Coordinators/assistant coaches

Legend

- (C) Team captain
- (S) Suspended
- (I) Ineligible
- Injured
- Redshirt
