= 1980 Cal State Hayward Pioneers football team =

American college football season

1980 Cal State Hayward Pioneers football
- Conference: Far Western Conference
- Record: 6–4 (3–2 FWC)
- Head coach: Tim Tierney (6th season)
- Home stadium: Pioneer Stadium

1980 Far Western Conference football standings
	Conf.					Overall
Team	W		L		T	W		L		T
UC Davis $	5	–	0	–	0	7	–	2	–	1
Cal State Hayward	3	–	2	–	0	6	–	4	–	0
Chico State	3	–	2	–	0	5	–	5	–	0
San Francisco State	2	–	3	–	0	3	–	6	–	1
Sacramento State	1	–	4	–	0	3	–	7	–	0
Humboldt State	1	–	4	–	0	2	–	8	–	0
$ – Conference champion

The 1980 Cal State Hayward Pioneers football team represented California State University, Hayward—now known as California State University, East Bay—as a member of the Far Western Conference (FWC) during the 1980 NCAA Division II football season. Led by sixth-year head coach Tim Tierney, Cal State Hayward compiled an overall record of 6–4 with a mark of 3–2 in conference play, tying for second place in the FWC. The team outscored its opponents 167 to 159 for the season. The Pioneers played home games at Pioneer Stadium in Hayward, California.

== Schedule ==
Date	Opponent	Site	Result	Attendance	Source
September 13	Cal State Northridge*	Pioneer Stadium; Hayward, CA	W 19–14	300–860	
September 20	at Santa Clara*	Buck Shaw Stadium; Santa Clara, CA	L 6–33	6,800	
September 27	Puget Sound*	Pioneer Stadium; Hayward, CA	W 17–10	1,100	
October 4	San Francisco State	Pioneer Stadium; Hayward, CA	W 21–7	1,032–1,235	
October 11	at Eastern Washington*	Joe Albi Stadium; Spokane, WA	L 3–24	6,000	
October 18	at Chico State	University Stadium; Chico, CA	W 35–17	3,600	
November 1	Sacramento State	Pioneer Stadium; Hayward, CA	W 14–10	500–1,800	
November 8	at Humboldt State	Redwood Bowl; Arcata, CA	L 6–23	980	
November 15	at UC Davis	Toomey Field; Davis, CA	L 16–21	6,500–6,880	
November 22	Saint Mary's*	Pioneer Stadium; Hayward, CA	W 30–0		
*Non-conference game
