= 1980 Southeast Missouri State Indians football team =

American college football season

1980 Southeast Missouri State Indians football
- Conference: Missouri Intercollegiate Athletic Association
- Record: 4–7 (3–3 MIAA)
- Head coach: Jim Lohr (6th season)
- Home stadium: Houck Stadium

1980 Missouri Intercollegiate Athletic Association football standings
	Conf.					Overall
Team	W		L		T	W		L		T
Missouri–Rolla $	6	–	0	–	0	10	–	0	–	0
SW Missouri State	5	–	1	–	0	6	–	5	–	0
Central Missouri	3	–	3	–	0	6	–	3	–	1
NE Missouri State	3	–	3	–	0	5	–	6	–	0
SE Missouri State	3	–	3	–	0	4	–	7	–	0
NW Missouri State	1	–	5	–	0	2	–	8	–	0
Lincoln (MO)	0	–	6	–	0	2	–	9	–	0
$ – Conference champion

The 1980 Southeast Missouri State Indians football team represented Southeast Missouri State University as a member of the Missouri Intercollegiate Athletic Association (MIAA) during the 1980 NCAA Division II football season. Led by sixth-year head coach Jim Lohr, the Indians compiled an overall record of 4–7 with a mark of 3–3 in conference play, placing in a three way tie for third in the MIAA. Southeast Missouri State played home game at Houck Stadium in Cape Girardeau, Missouri.

== Schedule ==
Date	Opponent	Site	Result	Attendance
September 6	at Murray State*	Roy Stewart Stadium; Murray, KY	L 6–19	15,000
September 13	Central Arkansas*	Houck Stadium; Cape Girardeau, MO	L 10–28	6,800
September 20	Evansville*	Houck Stadium; Cape Girardeau, MO	W 50–17	6,900
September 27	at Delta State*	McCool Stadium; Cleveland, MS	L 3–14	2,314
October 4	Southwest Missouri State	Houck Stadium; Cape Girardeau, MO	L 29–36	9,000
October 11	at Northeast Missouri State	Stokes Stadium; Kirksville, MO	L 10–13	3,500
October 18	at Northern Iowa*	UNI-Dome; Cedar Falls, IA	L 7–30	6,421
October 25	Lincoln (MO)*	Houck Stadium; Cape Girardeau, MO	W 57–3	8,700
November 1	at Northwest Missouri State	Bearcat Stadium; Maryville, MO	W 23–19	2,500
November 8	at Missouri–Rolla	Allgood–Bailey Stadium; Rolla, MO	L 23–34	4,000
November 15	Central Missouri State	Houck Stadium; Cape Girardeau, MO	W 31–17	1,860
*Non-conference game

== Roster ==
1980 Southeast Missouri State Redhawks football team roster
Players			Coaches
Offense: Pos. / # / Name / Class; RB / 40 / Ernest Edwards / Jr	Defense: Pos. / # / Name / Class; DT / 97 / Mike Gohn / Sr	Special teams: Pos. / # / Name / Class	Head coach: Jim Lohr; Coordinators/assistant coaches Legend: (C) Team captain; (S) Suspended; (I) Ineligible; Injured; Redshirt
