= University Stadium (Albuquerque) =

Stadium at the University of New Mexico

- Turner & Margaret Branch Field

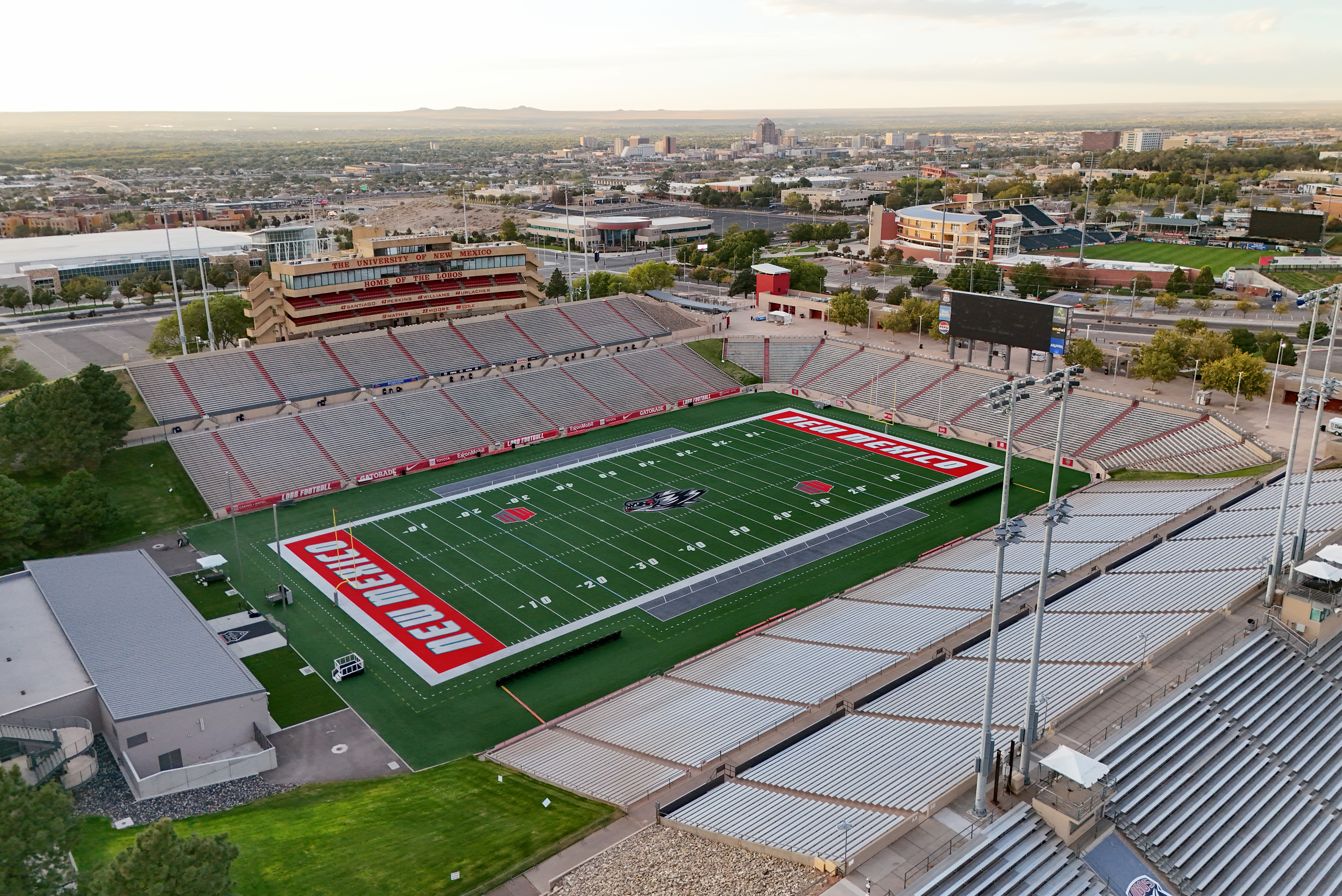
- View from southeast in 2024

- Location in the United States Location in New Mexico
- Interactive map of University Stadium
- Former names: Dreamstyle Stadium (2017–2020)
- Address: 1111 University Boulevard SE
- Location: University of New Mexico; Albuquerque, New Mexico, U.S.
- Coordinates: 35°4′1″N 106°37′42″W
- Elevation: 5,100 feet (1,555 m) AMSL
- Owner: University of New Mexico
- Operator: University of New Mexico
- Capacity: 39,224 (2010–present) Former capacity: List: 30,000 (1960–1977); 30,646 (1978–1994); 31,218 (1995–2000); 37,370 (2001–2003); 38,634 (2004–2007); 40,094 (2008–2009)
- Surface: FieldTurf (2012–present); Natural grass (1960–2011)
- Record attendance: 44,760 (vs. New Mexico State, September 17, 2005)

Construction
- Groundbreaking: 1958; 68 years ago
- Opened: September 17, 1960; 65 years ago
- Cost: $4.1 million ($44.6 million in 2025)
- Architects: W.C. Kruger and Associates

Tenants
- New Mexico Lobos (NCAA) (1960–present); New Mexico Bowl (NCAA) (2006–present)

Website
- golobos.com/stadium

University Stadium (officially Dreamstyle Stadium from 2017 to 2020) is an outdoor football stadium in the western United States, located on the south campus of the University of New Mexico in Albuquerque, New Mexico. It is the home field of New Mexico Lobos football, which competes as a member of the Mountain West Conference.

The stadium opened 66 years ago in September 1960, and currently has a seating capacity of 39,224. Its FieldTurf playing surface, named "Turner & Margaret Branch Field", has a traditional north-south alignment and sits nearly a mile above sea level, at an elevation of 5,100 feet (1,555 m). University Stadium is the fourth highest stadium in FBS college football, behind fellow Mountain West members Wyoming and Air Force, and Colorado of the Big 12 Conference.

== History ==
=== Replacement of Zimmerman Field ===
Before 1960, Lobos football teams played home games at Zimmerman Field, a 16,000-seat stadium which was located just south of the current Zimmerman Library on the university’s main campus. The growth of the university after World War II, with the concomitant growth in the popularity of varsity athletics, made it clear by the mid-1950s that a new, larger football venue was needed. Increasing enrollments also meant that space on the main campus was at a premium. As such, it was decided that a new stadium would be constructed off of the main campus, which would both allow adequate space for a much larger stadium, and free up space for desperately needed academic facilities on the main campus.

The university purchased land for the new stadium south of campus near the corner of Avenida Cesar Chavez and University Boulevard. This land became known as "south campus," and would eventually become the home of the entire UNM Athletic Department. Today, facilities located on south campus include The Pit, Isotopes Park, the Lobo Tennis Club, Lobo Field, Lobo Softball field, the Rudy Davalos Basketball Center, athletics administration buildings, as well as the football stadium.

The new stadium was christened as University Stadium upon its opening in 1960. It consisted of grandstands along the east and west sidelines and a press box above the west stands. The stadium was built in an arroyo, with the seating bowl created by the piling of excavated fill material to form earthen embankments on which the stands could be built. This "berm" style of construction placed the field below ground level with seats extending both above and below the natural grade. The initial construction cost of the stadium was just over $4 million. The inaugural football game at University Stadium took place on September 17, with the Lobos defeating the overmatched National University of Mexico Pumas 77–6.

A new press box with private suites was built before the 1976 season at a cost of $1.8 million. Because the stadium had been built on earthen fill, the press box had to be supported on large concrete piers that went down to the pre-existing ground level. In 1995, UNM made a major addition to University Stadium with the construction of the L.F. "Tow" Diehm Athletic Facility, a field house and athletic training facility located just beyond the south end zone.

For its first 52 seasons, the playing field was natural grass. The athletics department announced in late 2011 that it would be replaced with a synthetic playing surface, and infilled FieldTurf was installed prior to the 2012 season.

Through 2017, the Lobos have a record of 163–168–3 (.493) at University Stadium.

=== Naming rights ===
In 2012, naming rights for the stadium's playing surface were secured by local attorneys Turner and Margaret Branch, who are alumni and long-time donors to the UNM athletic department. Their $1.5 million donation to the “Lobo Leap to Excellence” capital campaign remains the second-largest single gift ever given to the athletic department by a living donor.

On May 3, 2017, UNM announced a $10 million, 10-year naming-rights agreement with Dreamstyle Remodeling, a local Albuquerque construction company, covering both the University Stadium and University Arena. The venues were rechristened as Dreamstyle Stadium and Dreamstyle Arena.

On September 18, 2020, after disputes between the University and Dreamstyle, the name was changed back to University Stadium for the time being; in addition, the Dreamstyle Arena was reverted back to The Pit.

== Expansion ==
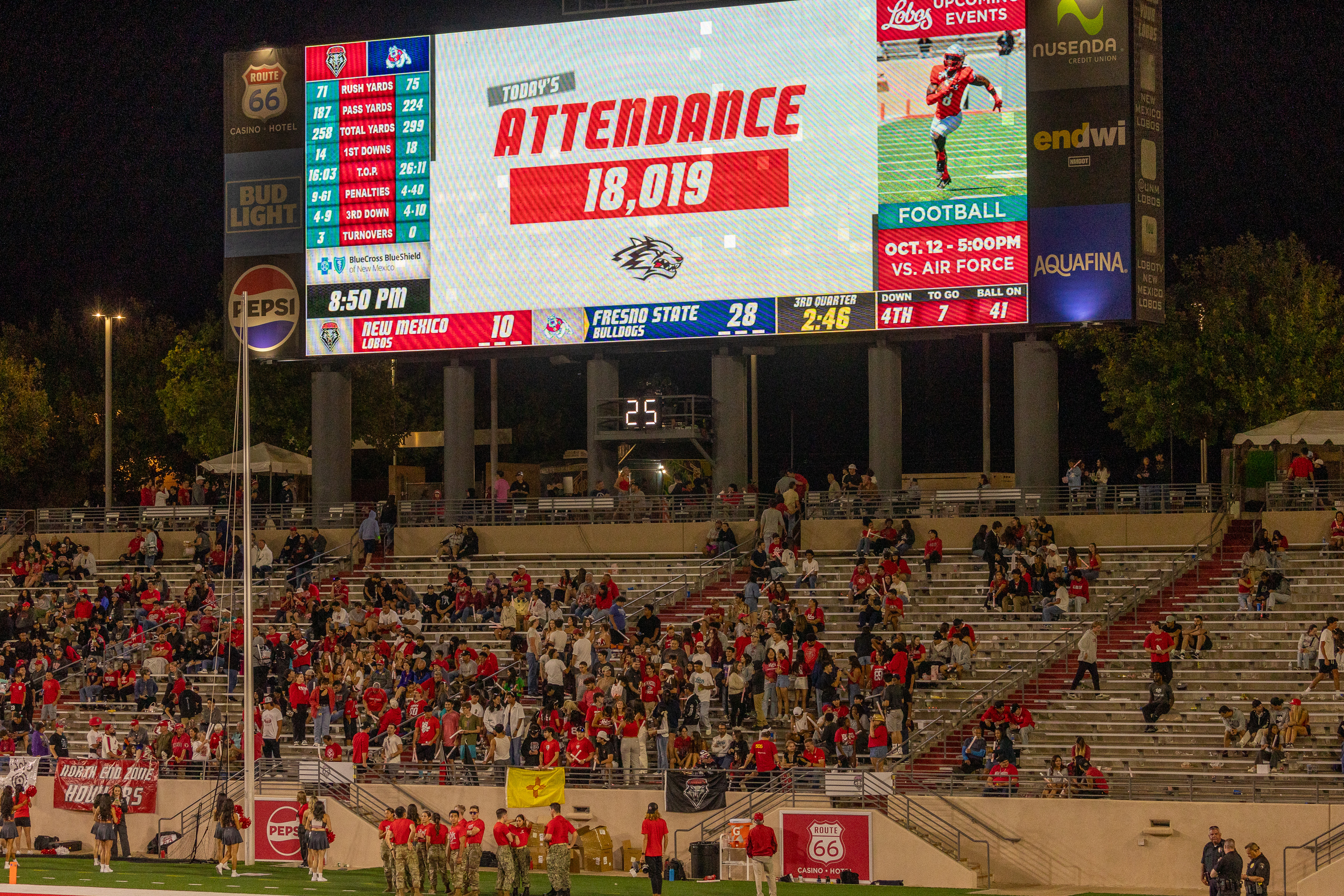
"LoboVision" screen

The stadium was expanded in 2001, with stands, new bathroom and concessions facilities constructed beyond the north end zone. UNM also added a large, state-of-the-art scoreboard that included the "LoboVision" video screen. In 2004, portable bleachers were donated to UNM by the city of Albuquerque in 2004 to take the stadium's capacity beyond 39,000.

Plans for future expansion have been adopted. The next phase of expansion includes renovations of the stadium's southwest and southeast corners, as well as adding five thousand seats to the south end. Additionally, a tunnel connecting Dreamstyle Stadium and the Tow Diehm Facility has also been planned to allow easier player access to locker rooms during games. When the currently planned renovations are completed, the stadium will seat over 43,000 spectators.

== Notable events ==
=== Zia Bowl ===
University Stadium hosted the title game of NCAA Division II Football Championship, named the Zia Bowl, in early December 1979 and 1980. In Zia Bowl I, Delaware defeated Youngstown State, 38–21. In Zia Bowl II, Cal Poly beat Eastern Illinois, 21–13. Attendance was 4,000 or less for both Zia Bowls, and in 1981 the NCAA Division II title game was moved to McAllen, Texas.

=== New Mexico Bowl ===
Since December 2006, University Stadium has hosted the New Mexico Bowl. The game was funded by a $2 million line of credit from ESPN. The inaugural edition featured New Mexico against future Mountain West Conference foe San Jose State, then of the Western Athletic Conference. San Jose State won, 20–12. The game was the first NCAA Division I bowl game played in the state of New Mexico.

=== Soccer ===
University Stadium hosted a U.S. women's national soccer team friendly match against Mexico in May 2004. Three U.S. men's national soccer team matches have been played in the stadium, with the most recent being a friendly match with Honduras in March 2005.

Date	Winning Team	Result	Losing Team	Tournament	Spectators
June 7, 1988	Ecuador	1–0	United States	Friendly	N/A
April 30, 1994	Chile	2–0	United States	Friendly	15,610
May 9, 2004	United States	3–0	Mexico	Women's Friendly	17,805
March 19, 2005	United States	1–0	Honduras	Friendly	9,222

=== Concerts ===
The stadium has hosted concerts by many famous artists, including Metallica & The Rolling Stones, among others.

Date	Artist	Opening act(s)	Tour / Concert name	Attendance	Revenue	Notes
September 23, 1974	Santana	—	Welcome Tour	—	—	
August 2, 1994	Metallica	Danzig; Suicidal Tendencies; Candlebox; Fight	Shit Hits the Sheds Tour	—	—	
October 30, 1997	The Rolling Stones	Sheryl Crow	Bridges to Babylon Tour	34,362 / 34,362	$2,075,326	

== Gallery ==
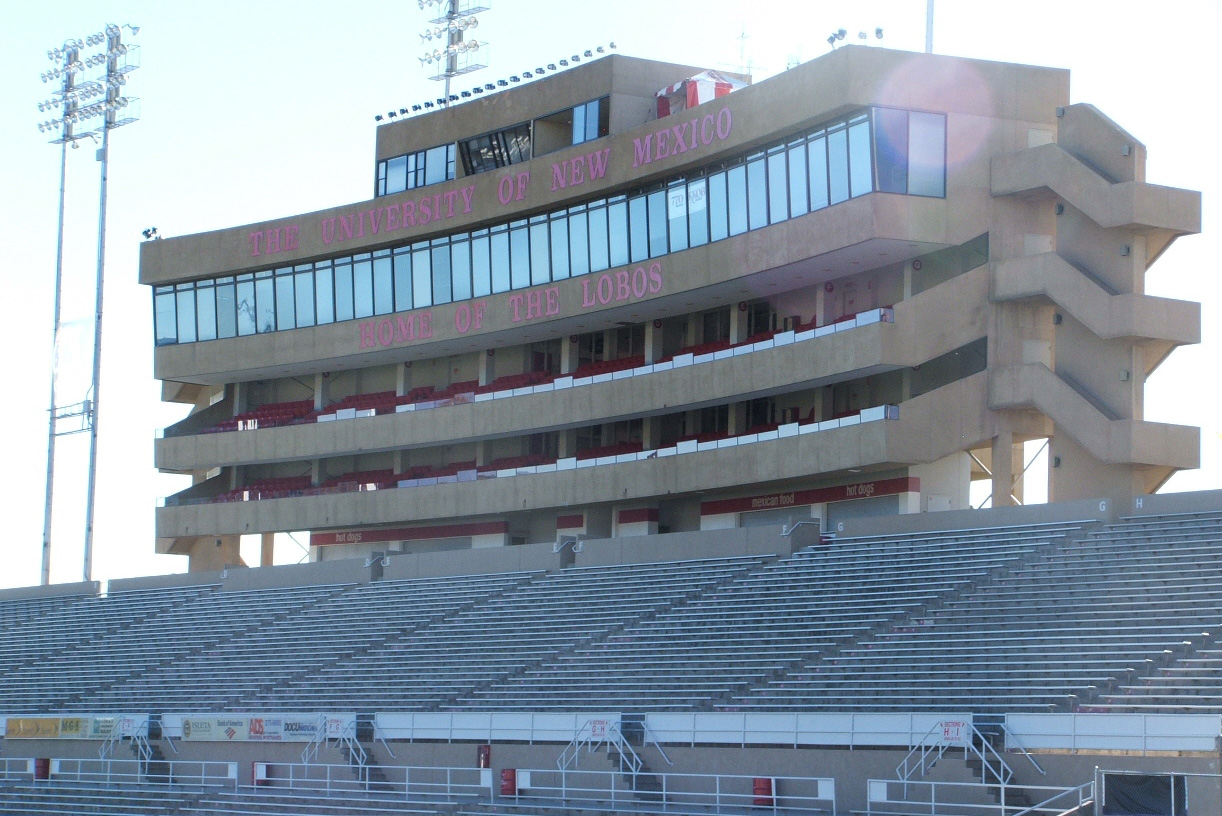
Press box, 2006

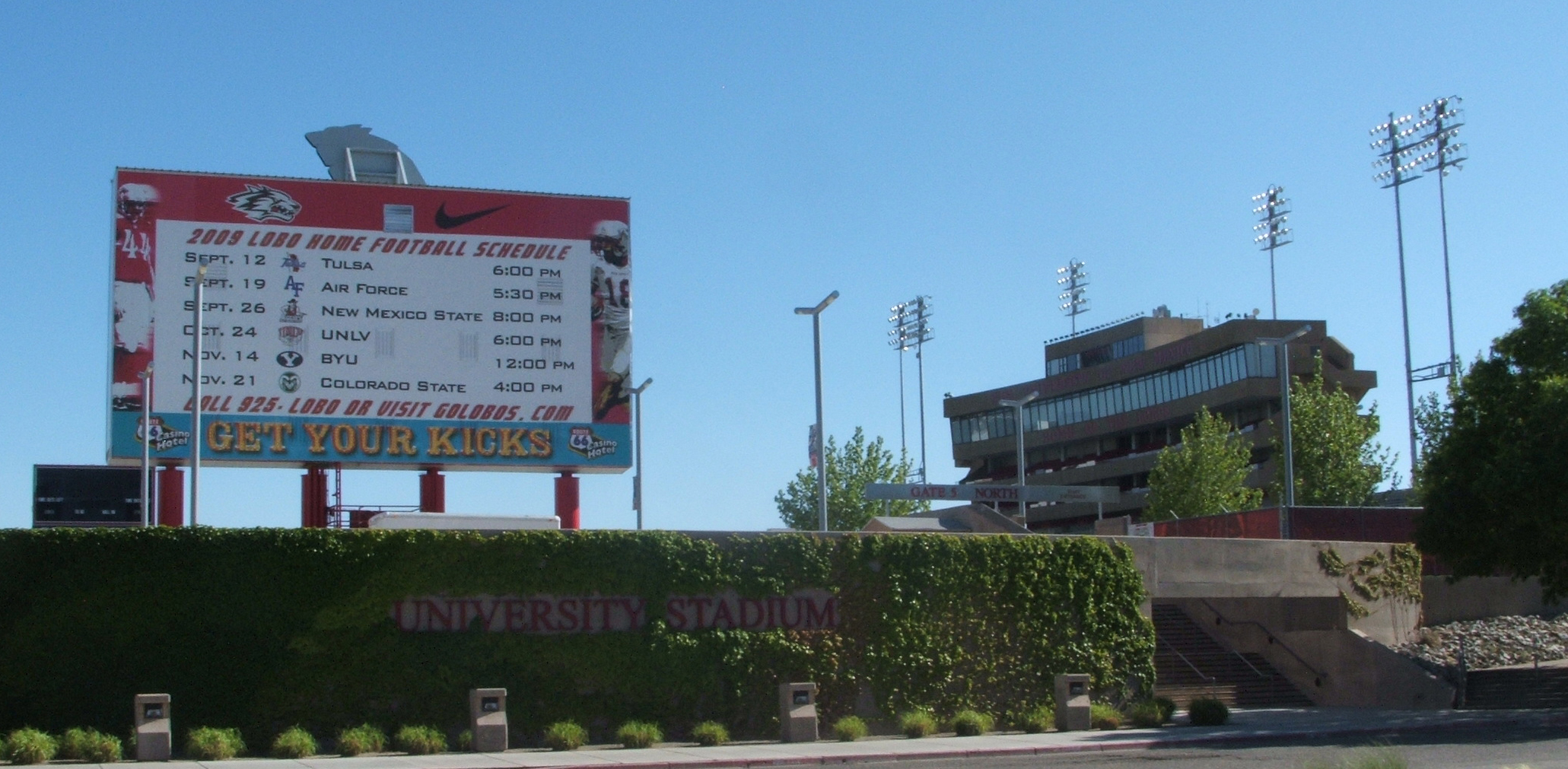
North side, 2010

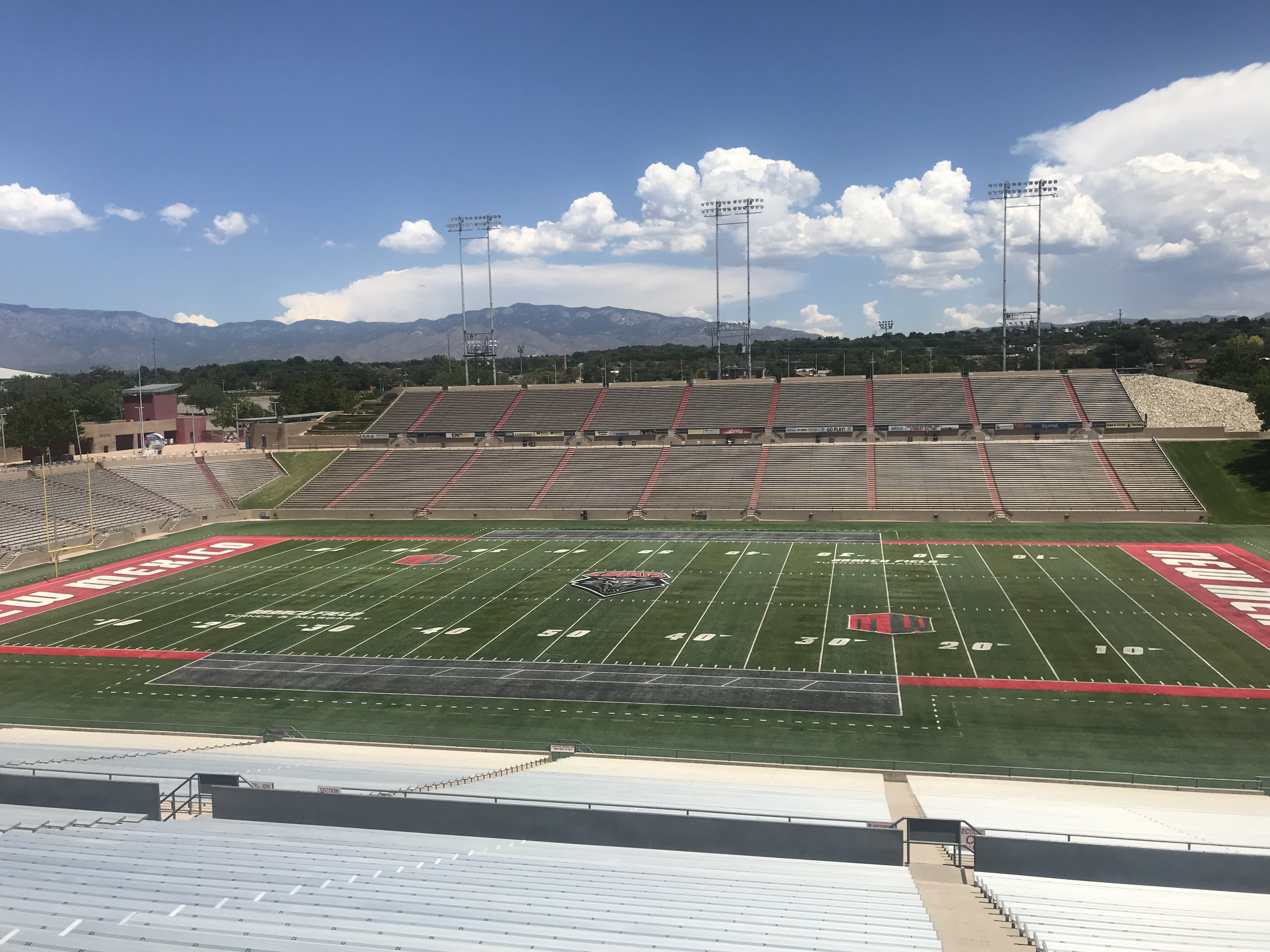
View in 2019

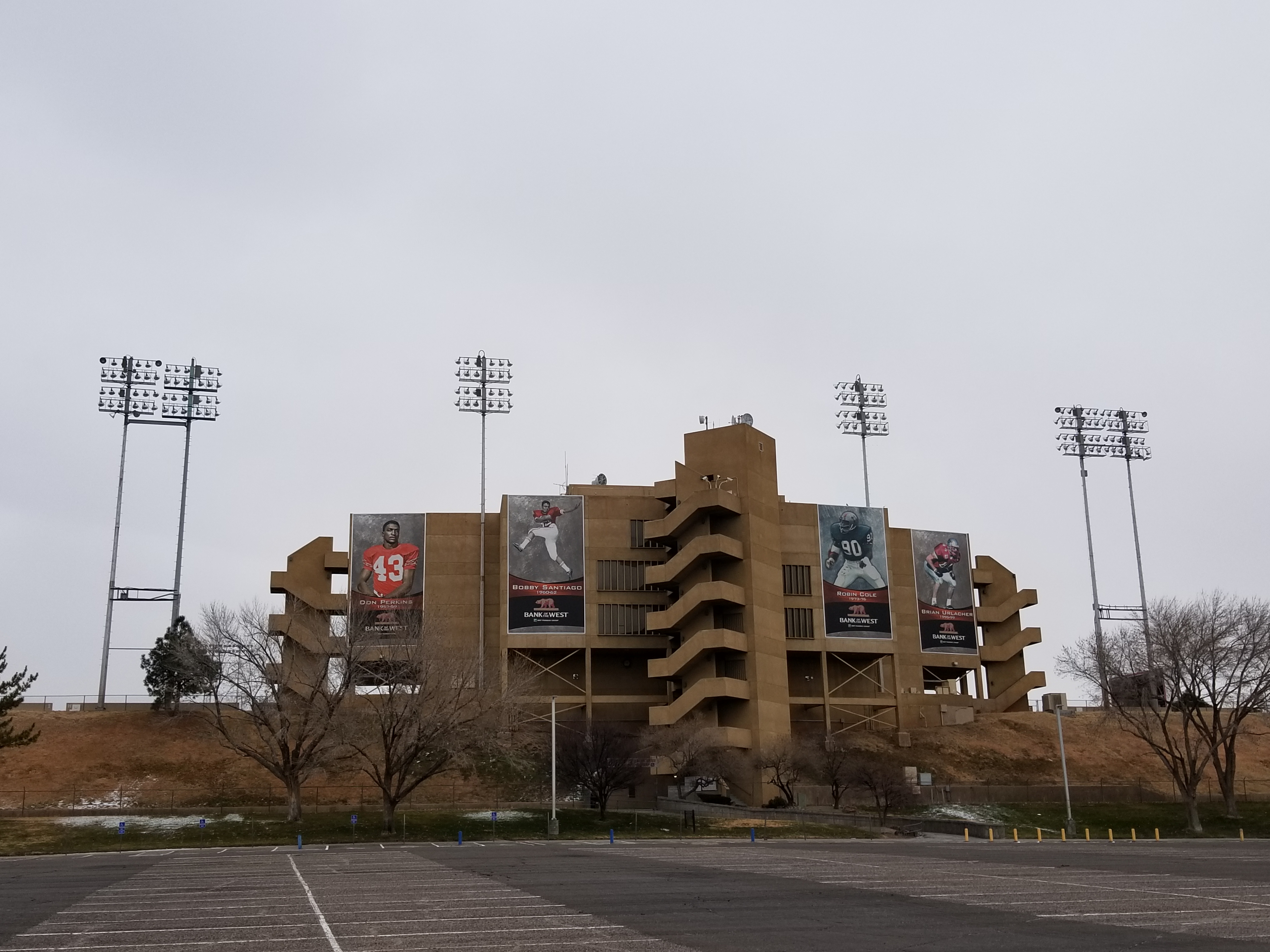
Exterior view, 2019

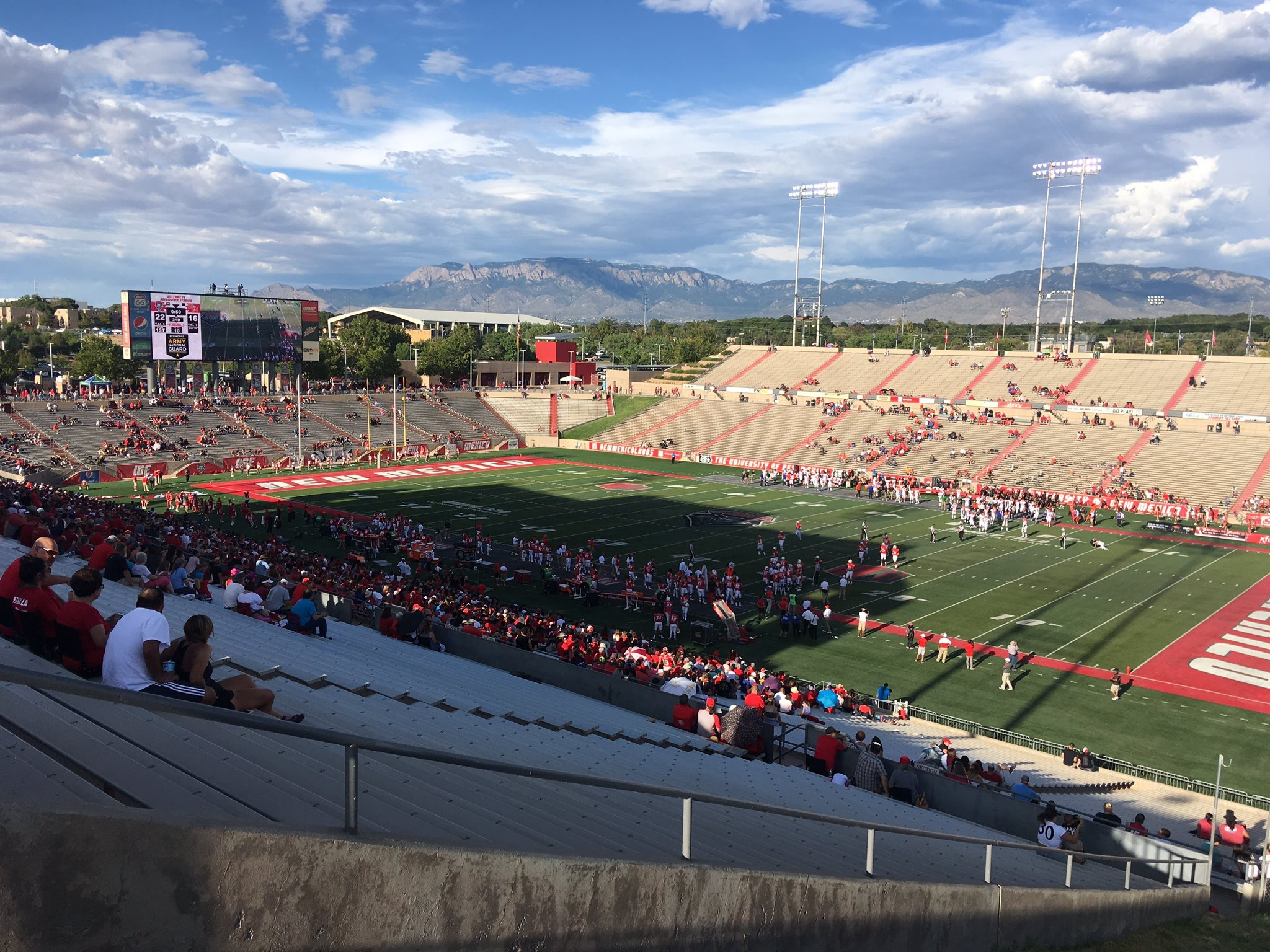
Football game in 2022

== See also ==
- List of NCAA Division I FBS football stadiums
