= Zia Bowl =

Zia Bowl (defunct)
- NCAA Division II Football Championship
- Stadium: University Stadium
- Location: Albuquerque, New Mexico

Sponsors
- Albuquerque Jaycees

New Mexico state flag, with Zia at center

The Zia Bowl was an American college football bowl game played at University Stadium in Albuquerque, New Mexico. It decided the NCAA Division II National Football Championship in 1979 and 1980.

The bowl was sponsored by the Albuquerque Jaycees, who began working late in 1977 to bring the event to the city. The NCAA awarded the game to Albuquerque in April 1979.

The game was named after the Zia, the symbol in the center of the New Mexico state flag. A Zia Bowl parade was held in downtown Albuquerque on the morning of the game. Other related activities included a 5K race.

The Zia Bowl failed to draw much interest locally, and only 4,000 attended the 1979 game. Shortly after the 1980 game drew an announced crowd of just 2,056, the Zia Bowl folded. In May 1981, the NCAA awarded the Division II championship to the Palm Bowl in McAllen, Texas for the next five years.

== Game results ==
Date played	Winning team		Losing team		Ref.
December 8, 1979	Delaware	38	Youngstown State	21	
December 13, 1980	Cal Poly	21	Eastern Illinois	13	
