= 1980 NCAA Division II football rankings =

The 1980 NCAA Division II football rankings are from the Associated Press. This is for the 1980 season.

== Legend ==
	Increase in ranking
	Decrease in ranking
	Not ranked previous week
(#–#)	Win–loss record
(Italics)	Number of first place votes
т	Tied with team above or below also with this symbol

== Associated Press poll ==
	Week 1 Sept 24	Week 2 Oct 1	Week 3 Oct 8	Week 4 Oct 15	Week 5 Oct 22	Week 6 Oct 29	Week 7 Nov 5	Week 8 Nov 12	Week 9 Nov 19	
1.	Northern Michigan (3–0)	Northern Michigan (4–0)	Nebraska–Omaha (5–0)	Nebraska–Omaha (6–0)	Northern Michigan (7–0)	Northern Michigan (8–0)	Eastern Illinois (7–2)	Eastern Illinois (8–2)	Eastern Illinois (9–2)	1.
2.	Nebraska–Omaha (3–0)	Nebraska–Omaha (4–0)	Northern Michigan (5–0)	Northern Michigan (6–0)	Nebraska–Omaha (7–0)	Eastern Illinois (6–2)	Northern Michigan (8–1)	Northern Michigan (9–1)	Northern Michigan (9–1)	2.
3.	Troy State (2–0)	Troy State (3–0)	Troy State (4–0)	Troy State (5–0)	Troy State (6–0)	Jacksonville State (5–1)	Jacksonville State (6–1)	Jacksonville State (7–1)	Cal Poly (7–2)	3.
4.	Central Connecticut State (2–0) т	North Alabama (3–0)	North Alabama (4–0)	Jacksonville State (5–1)	Jacksonville State (5–1)	Nebraska–Omaha (7–1)	Cal Poly (5–2)	Cal Poly (6–2)	Jacksonville State (8–1)	4.
5.	Southwest Texas State (2–0) т	Southwest Texas State (2–1)	Santa Clara (4–1)	American International (5–0)	Eastern Illinois (5–2)	Cal Poly (4–2)	Nebraska–Omaha (7–1)	Troy State (8–1)	North Alabama (8–1)	5.
6.	North Alabama (2–0)	East Stroudsburg (2–1)	American International (4–0)	Eastern Illinois (4–2)	American International (6–0)	North Alabama (6–1)	North Alabama (7–1)	North Alabama (7–1)	Virginia Union (8–1–1)	6.
7.	Western Illinois (2–0)	Eastern Washington (3–0)	Jacksonville State (4–1)	Cal Poly (3–2)	Cal Poly (3–2)	Troy State (6–1)	Troy State (7–1)	American International (8–1)	Santa Clara (8–2)	7.
8.	Virginia Union (2–0)	Jacksonville State (3–1)	Eastern Illinois (3–2)	Virginia Union (4–1)	Virginia Union (5–1)	American International (6–1)	American International (7–1)	Nebraska–Omaha (7–2)	Southwest Texas State (8–2)	8.
9.	Puget Sound (3–0)	Missouri–Rolla (4–0)	Springfield (MA) (2–1)	North Alabama (4–1)	North Alabama (5–1)	Santa Clara (5–2)	Santa Clara (6–2) т	Santa Clara (7–2)	American International (8–2)	9.
10.	Edinboro State (2–0)	Slippery Rock (3–1) т	Cal Poly (5–0)	Santa Clara (4–2)	Santa Clara (4–2)	Northern Colorado (8–0)	Northern Iowa (6–2) т	Southwest Texas State (7–2) т	Northern Colorado (7–3)	10.
11.		Virginia Union (2–1) т						Virginia Union (7–1–1) т		11.
	Week 1 Sept 24	Week 2 Oct 1	Week 3 Oct 8	Week 4 Oct 15	Week 5 Oct 22	Week 6 Oct 29	Week 7 Nov 5	Week 8 Nov 12	Week 9 Nov 19	
		Dropped: 4 Central Connecticut State; 7 Western Illinois; 9 Puget Sound; 10 Edinboro State	Dropped: 5 Southwest Texas State; 6 East Stroudsburg; 7 Eastern Washington; 9 Missouri–Rolla; 10 Slippery Rock; 10 Virginia Union	Dropped: 9 Springfield (MA)	None	Dropped: 8 Virginia Union	Dropped: 10 Northern Colorado	Dropped: 10 Northern Iowa	Dropped: 5 Troy State; 8 Nebraska–Omaha	
