= List of Southeastern Conference national championships =

The list of Southeastern Conference national championships begins in 1933, the first year of competition for the Southeastern Conference (SEC), and includes 214 team national championships sanctioned by the National Collegiate Athletic Association (NCAA), and four additional national championships sanctioned by the Association for Intercollegiate Athletics for Women (AIAW), won by current conference members through the end of the 2025–26 school year. In 2025–26, six SEC members combined to claim 12 NCAA national championships: Arkansas in men's indoor and outdoor track & field; Auburn in men's golf; Georgia in women's indoor and outdoor track & field; Oklahoma in baseball and women's gymnastics; Texas in women's rowing, softball, and men's swimming & diving; and Texas A&M in women's tennis and women's volleyball. Also, South Carolina won a championship in women's equestrian, not a fully sanctioned NCAA sport but recognized as part of the NCAA Emerging Sports for Women program.

The SEC has averaged almost seven national championships per year since 1990.

Listed below are all championship teams of NCAA-sponsored events, as well as the titles won in football and equestrian, which are not official NCAA-sanctioned championships. Conference members have won at least one title in every sponsored sport in which the SEC participates. Kentucky first completed this feat by winning the 2020 National Championship in women's volleyball on April 24, 2021. At the time, the SEC did not sponsor women's rowing, which it added once rowing-sponsoring Oklahoma and Texas joined in 2024. The feat was completed a second time when Texas (which had won three NCAA rowing titles before joining the SEC) won its first championship in that sport as an SEC member on May 31, 2026. Between 1979 and 1982, teams representing current member universities also claimed four AIAW Championships.

== Fall sports ==
=== Football (43 claimed) ===
Schools don't necessarily claim each of the championships listed.

Pre-SEC

- Prior to 1932, Vanderbilt was named national champion in football in 1921 and 1922 by Berryman.
- Prior to 1932, LSU was named national champion in football in 1908 by the National Championship Foundation.
- Prior to 1932, Auburn was named national champion in football in 1913 by Billingsley and 1914 by Howell.
- Prior to 1932, Alabama claimed national championships in football in 1925, 1926, and 1930.
- Prior to 1932, Georgia was named national champion in football in 1920 by Berryman and 1927 by the Boand and Poling polls.
- Prior to 1932, former member Georgia Tech claimed football national titles in 1917 and 1928.
- Prior to joining the SEC in 1992, Arkansas claimed the 1964 football national championship awarded by the Football Writers Association of America (FW) and Helms Athletic Foundation (Helms) polls. Arkansas has 1 more unclaimed national title in 1977 awarded by the Rothman (FACT) poll.
- Prior to joining the SEC in 2012, Texas A&M claimed national titles in 1919, 1927, and 1939. The 1919 title was awarded by Billingsley Report (BR) and the National Championship Foundation (NCF). The 1927 title was awarded by the Sagarin Ratings (SR). The 1939 title was awarded by the AP poll.
- Prior to joining the SEC in 2024, Oklahoma, officially claims 7 national titles, with 11 more unclaimed titles.
- Prior to joining the SEC in 2024, Texas, officially claims 4 national titles, with 5 more unclaimed titles.
- **Bold** type indicates title is officially claimed by the university.

Year	School	Source	Officially Claimed
1934	**Alabama**	Dunkel, Houlgate, Poling, Williamson, Ronnie Bunch	**Yes**
1935	LSU	Williamson	No
1936	LSU	Williamson	No
1938	**Tennessee**	Billingsley, Boand, Dunkel, Football Research, Houlgate, Litkenhous, Poling, Sagarin	**Yes**
1940	**Tennessee**	Dunkel, Williamson	**Yes**
1941	**Alabama**	Houlgate	**Yes**
1942	**Georgia**	Berryman, DeVold, Houlgate, Litkenhous, Poling, Williamson	**Yes**
1945	Alabama	National Championship Foundation	No
1946	Georgia	Williamson	No
1950	**Kentucky**	Sagarin	**Yes**
1950	**Tennessee**	Billingsley, DeVold, Dunkel, Football Research, National Championship Foundation	**Yes**
1951	**Tennessee**	AP, Litkenhous, UPI, Williamson	**Yes**
1951	Georgia Tech	Berryman, Boand	No
1952	**Georgia Tech**	Berryman, INS, Poling	**Yes**
1956	Tennessee	Sagarin	No
1956	Georgia Tech	Berryman	No
1957	**Auburn**	AP, Football Research, Helms, National Championship Foundation, Poling, Williamson	**Yes**
1958	**LSU**	AP, Berryman, Billingsley, Boand, DeVold, Dunkel, FB News, Football Research, Helms, Litkenhous, National Championship Foundation, Poling, Sagarin, UPI, Williamson	**Yes**
1959	**Ole Miss**	Berryman, Dunkel, Sagarin	**Yes**
1960	**Ole Miss**	Billingsley, DeVold, Dunkel, Football Research, FW, National Championship Foundation, Williamson	**Yes**
1961	**Alabama**	AP, Berryman, Billingsley, DeVold, Dunkel, FB News, Football Research, Helms, Litkenhous, National Championship Foundation, NFF, Sagarin, UPI, Williamson	**Yes**
1962	LSU	Berryman	No
1962	**Ole Miss**	Billingsley, Litkenhous, Sagarin	**Yes**
1964	**Arkansas**	FWAA	**Yes**
1965	**Alabama**	AP, Billingsley, Football Research, FW, National Championship Foundation	**Yes**
1966	Alabama	Berryman	No
1967	**Tennessee**	Litkenhous	**Yes**
1968	Georgia	Litkenhous	No
1973	**Alabama**	Berryman, UPI	**Yes**
1975	Alabama	Matthews	No
1977	Alabama	Football Research	No
1978	**Alabama**	AP, FACT, Football Research, FW, Helms, National Championship Foundation, NFF	**Yes**
1979	**Alabama**	AP, Berryman, Billingsley, DeVold, Dunkel, FACT, FB News, FW, Helms, Matthews, National Championship Foundation, NFF, NY Times, Poling, Sagarin, Sporting News, UPI	**Yes**
1980	**Georgia**	AP, Berryman, FACT, FB News, FW, Helms, National Championship Foundation, NFF, Poling, Sporting News, UPI	**Yes**
1983	Auburn	FACT, Football Research, NY Times	No
1984	Florida	Billingsley, DeVold, Dunkel, FACT, Matthews, NY Times, Sagarin, Sporting News	No
1992	**Alabama**	AP, Berryman, Billingsley, DeVold, Dunkel, Eck, FACT, FB News, Football Research, FW, Matthews, National Championship Foundation, NY Times, Sporting News, UPI/NFF, USA/CNN	**Yes**
1993	Auburn	National Championship Foundation	No
1996	**Florida**	AP, Berryman, Billingsley, Eck, FACT, FB News, FW, NFF, Sagarin, Sporting News, USA/CNN, NY Times, National Championship Foundation, Dunkel, Matthews, DeVold	**Yes**
1998	**Tennessee**	Alderson, AP, BCS, Berryman, Billingsley, DeVold, Dunkel, Eck, FACT, FB News, FW, Matthews, National Championship Foundation, NFF, NY Times, Seattle Times, Sporting News, USA/ESPN	**Yes**
2003	**LSU**	BCS, Billingsley, Colley, DeVold, Dunkel, FACT, Massey, NFF, Sagarin, Seattle Times, USA/ESPN	**Yes**
2006	**Florida**	BCS, USA Today, AP	**Yes**
2007	**LSU**	BCS, USA Today, AP	**Yes**
2008	**Florida**	BCS, USA Today, AP	**Yes**
2009	**Alabama**	BCS, USA Today, AP	**Yes**
2010	**Auburn**	BCS, USA Today, AP	**Yes**
2011	**Alabama**	BCS, USA Today, AP	**Yes**
2012	**Alabama**	BCS, USA Today, AP	**Yes**
2015	**Alabama**	CFP, USA Today, AP	**Yes**
2017	**Alabama**	CFP, USA Today, AP	**Yes**
2019	**LSU**	CFP, USA Today, AP	**Yes**
2020	**Alabama**	CFP, USA Today, AP	**Yes**
2021	**Georgia**	CFP, USA Today, AP	**Yes**
2022	**Georgia**	CFP, USA Today, AP	**Yes**

=== Men's cross country (8) ===
- Prior to joining the SEC in 1992, Arkansas won four titles in men's cross country.

Year	School
1972	Tennessee
1991	Arkansas
1992	Arkansas
1993	Arkansas
1995	Arkansas
1998	Arkansas
1999	Arkansas
2000	Arkansas

=== Women's cross country (2) ===
- Prior to joining the SEC in 2024, Texas has won one team title in women's cross country (1986).

Year	School
1988	Kentucky
2019	Arkansas

=== Women's soccer (1) ===
Year	School
1998	Florida

=== Women's volleyball (2) ===
- Prior to joining the SEC in 2024, Texas won three national titles in women's volleyball (1988, 2012, 2022).

Year	School
2020 (Note: Due to COVID-19, the NCAA moved its Division I championships in fall sports from 2020 to spring 2021. It labeled the originally planned fall 2020 season as the "2020–21" season, but kept the original "2020" branding for the tournament.)	Kentucky
2025	Texas A&M

=== Men's soccer (0) ===
The SEC has never sponsored men's soccer; only two current members, Kentucky and South Carolina, sponsor the sport. After more than a decade as Conference USA rivals, both teams moved to the Sun Belt Conference for 2022 and beyond. Their annual derby is nicknamed the "Southeastern Conference Championship Game".

== Winter sports ==
=== Men's basketball (12 official) ===
The NCAA did not sanction a postseason tournament to determine a national champion until 1939. Some schools claim basketball national championships based on polls for seasons prior to 1939, but those are not listed here.

Year	School	Notes
1948	Kentucky	
1949	Kentucky	
1951	Kentucky	
1958	Kentucky	
1978	Kentucky	
1994	Arkansas	
1996	Kentucky	
1998	Kentucky	
2006	Florida	
2007	Florida	
2012	Kentucky	
2025	Florida	

Note: LSU claims a basketball national championship on the basis of a win in the 1935 American Legion Bowl, though the event made no claim to determine a national champion. Kentucky also claims the 1933 title, based on the Helms poll. Neither of these claimed titles are officially recognized by the NCAA and thus are not listed here.

=== Women's basketball (12) ===
- Prior to joining the SEC in 2012, Texas A&M won one women's basketball title (in 2011).
- Prior to joining the SEC in 2024, Texas won one women's basketball title in 1986.

Year	School
1987	Tennessee
1989	Tennessee
1991	Tennessee
1996	Tennessee
1997	Tennessee
1998	Tennessee
2007	Tennessee
2008	Tennessee
2017	South Carolina
2022	South Carolina
2023	LSU
2024	South Carolina

=== Men's gymnastics (0) ===
The SEC has never sponsored men's gymnastics. Oklahoma has won 12 team titles in that sport, all before joining the SEC.

=== Women's gymnastics (23) ===
- Before joining the SEC in 2024, Oklahoma won five team titles in women's gymnastics.

Year	School
1982	Florida
1987	Georgia
1988	Alabama
1989	Georgia
1991	Alabama
1993	Georgia
1996	Alabama
1998	Georgia
1999	Georgia
2002	Alabama
2005	Georgia
2006	Georgia
2007	Georgia
2008	Georgia
2009	Georgia
2011	Alabama
2012	Alabama
2013	Florida
2014	Florida ***
2015	Florida
2024	LSU
2025	Oklahoma
2026	Oklahoma

*** Florida shared the 2014 national title with Oklahoma.

Note before 1981, the Association for Intercollegiate Athletics for Women (AIAW) was the sole governing body for women's intercollegiate athletics and sponsored national championships in women's sports. Starting in 1981, the National Collegiate Athletics Association (NCAA) began to sponsor women's athletic championships as well as those for men's sports. During the 1981–82 school year, the AIAW and NCAA both sponsored championships in several women's sports. Starting in 1982–83, the NCAA became the sole sponsor of women's intercollegiate sports championships and national championships in those sports.

=== Men's indoor track and field (21) ===
- Prior to joining the SEC in 1992, Arkansas won eight titles in men's indoor track.
- Prior to joining the SEC in 2012, Missouri won one title in men's indoor track.
- Prior to joining the SEC in 2024, Texas won one men's indoor track title in 2022.

Year	School
1992	Arkansas
1993	Arkansas
1994	Arkansas
1995	Arkansas
1997	Arkansas
1998	Arkansas
1999	Arkansas
2000	Arkansas
2001	LSU
2002	Tennessee
2003	Arkansas
2004	LSU
2005	Arkansas
2006	Arkansas
2010	Florida
2011	Florida
2012	Florida
2013	Arkansas
2017	Texas A&M
2018	Florida
2026	Arkansas

=== Women's indoor track and field (21) ===
- Prior to joining the SEC in 2024, Texas won six titles in women's indoor track and field (1986, 1988, 1990, 1998, 1999, 2006).

Year	School
1987	LSU
1989	LSU
1991	LSU
1992	Florida
1993	LSU
1994	LSU
1995	LSU
1996	LSU
1997	LSU
2002	LSU
2003	LSU
2004	LSU
2005	Tennessee
2009	Tennessee
2015	Arkansas
2018	Georgia
2019	Arkansas
2021	Arkansas
2022	Florida
2023	Arkansas
2024	Arkansas
2026	Georgia

=== Men's swimming and diving (13) ===
- Before joining the SEC in 2024, Texas won 15 team titles in men's swimming & diving (1981, 1988, 1989, 1990, 1991, 1996, 2000, 2001, 2002, 2010, 2015, 2016, 2017, 2018, 2021).

Year	School
1978	Tennessee
1983	Florida
1984	Florida
1997	Auburn
1999	Auburn
2003	Auburn
2004	Auburn
2005	Auburn
2006	Auburn
2007	Auburn
2009	Auburn
2025	Texas
2026	Texas

=== Women's swimming and diving (15) ===
- Prior to joining the SEC in 2024, Texas won 7 team titles in women's swimming & diving (1984, 1985, 1986, 1987, 1988, 1990, and 1991).

Year	School
1979	Florida
1982	Florida
1999	Georgia
2000	Georgia
2001	Georgia
2002	Auburn
2003	Auburn
2004	Auburn
2005	Georgia
2006	Auburn
2007	Auburn
2010	Florida
2013	Georgia
2014	Georgia
2016	Georgia

Note before 1981, the Association for Intercollegiate Athletics for Women (AIAW) was the sole governing body for women's intercollegiate athletics and sponsored national championships in women's sports. Starting in 1981, the National Collegiate Athletics Association (NCAA) began to sponsor women's athletic championships as well as those for men's sports. During the 1981–82 school year, the AIAW and NCAA both sponsored championships in several women's sports. Beginning in 1982–83, the NCAA became the sole sponsor of women's intercollegiate sports championships and national championships in those sports.

=== Women's bowling (3) ===
Year	School
2007	Vanderbilt
2018	Vanderbilt
2023	Vanderbilt

Note that the SEC does not sponsor bowling. Vanderbilt won its first title as an independent and its second and third as a member of the single-sport Southland Bowling League. Since the 2023–24 school year, Vanderbilt bowling has competed in Conference USA, which absorbed the SBL after the 2022–23 season.

=== Rifle (4) ===
Year	School
2011	Kentucky
2018	Kentucky
2021	Kentucky
2022	Kentucky

Note that the SEC does not sponsor rifle. Kentucky is a member of the single-sport Great America Rifle Conference.

=== Men's wrestling (0) ===
The SEC sponsored men's wrestling from 1969 to 1981, but no member won an NCAA team title during the existence of SEC men's wrestling. Oklahoma has won seven national team championships in that sport, all before joining the SEC. Missouri and Oklahoma are currently wrestling-only members of the Big 12 Conference, in which they had been full members before joining the SEC in 2012 and 2024, respectively.

Women's wrestling became an official NCAA championship sport in 2025–26. However, of the 113 schools that competed in that season, only six are Division I members, and none are from the SEC.

== Spring sports ==
=== Baseball (18) ===
Three SEC members have won national titles before joining the conference:

- Prior to joining the SEC in 2012, Missouri won one national title (in 1954).
- Prior to joining the SEC in 2024, Oklahoma won titles in 1951 and 1994.
- Prior to joining the SEC in 2024, Texas won six titles (1949, 1950, 1975, 1983, 2002, and 2005).

Year	School
1990	Georgia
1991	LSU
1993	LSU
1996	LSU
1997	LSU
2000	LSU
2009	LSU
2010	South Carolina
2011	South Carolina
2014	Vanderbilt
2017	Florida
2019	Vanderbilt
2021	Mississippi State
2022	Ole Miss
2023	LSU
2024	Tennessee
2025	LSU
2026	Oklahoma

=== Softball (5) ===
Two SEC members have won national titles in softball before becoming SEC members:

- Before joining the SEC in 2012, Texas A&M won one AIAW title (1982) and two NCAA titles (1983 and 1987).
- Before joining the SEC in 2024, Oklahoma won eight NCAA titles (2000, 2014, 2016, 2017, 2021, 2022, 2023, 2024).

Year	School
2012	Alabama
2014	Florida
2015	Florida
2025	Texas
2026	Texas

=== Men's outdoor track and field (24) ===
- Prior to joining the SEC in 1992, Arkansas won one title in men's outdoor track.
- Prior to joining the SEC in 2012, Texas A&M won three titles in men's outdoor track.

Year	School
1933	LSU
1974	Tennessee
1989	LSU
1990	LSU
1991	Tennessee
1992	Arkansas
1993	Arkansas
1994	Arkansas
1995	Arkansas
1996	Arkansas
1997	Arkansas
1998	Arkansas
1999	Arkansas
2001	Tennessee
2002	LSU
2003	Arkansas
2004	Arkansas (vacated)
2005	Arkansas (vacated)
2012	Florida
2013	Texas A&M/Florida***
2016	Florida
2017	Florida
2018	Georgia
2022	Florida
2023	Florida
2024	Florida
2026	Arkansas

* Arkansas was forced to vacate the NCAA titles won in 2004 and 2005 because of recruiting violations with Tyson Gay. Florida finished second both years.

*** Texas A&M and Florida finished tied for the national title at the 2013 NCAA Outdoor Track and Field Championship.

=== Women's outdoor track and field (21) ===
- Prior to joining the SEC in 2012, Texas A&M won three titles in women's outdoor track.
- Prior to joining the SEC in 2024, Texas won five titles in women's outdoor track and field (1986, 1998, 1999, 2005, and 2023).

Year	School
1981	Tennessee
1987	LSU
1988	LSU
1989	LSU
1990	LSU
1991	LSU
1992	LSU
1993	LSU
1994	LSU
1995	LSU
1996	LSU
1997	LSU
2000	LSU
2002	South Carolina
2003	LSU
2006	Auburn
2008	LSU
2012	LSU (vacated)
2014	Texas A&M
2019	Arkansas
2022	Florida
2024	Arkansas
2025	Georgia
2026	Georgia

- LSU was forced to vacate the 2012 Women's Outdoor Track and Field Championship due to positive testing for banned substances in one athlete.

Note before 1981, the Association for Intercollegiate Athletics for Women (AIAW) was the sole governing body for women's intercollegiate athletics and sponsored national championships in women's sports. Starting in 1981, the National Collegiate Athletics Association (NCAA) began to sponsor women's athletic championships as well as those for men's sports. During the 1981–82 school year, the AIAW and NCAA both sponsored championships in several women's sports. Beginning in 1982–83, the NCAA became the sole sponsor of women's intercollegiate sports championships and national championships in those sports.

=== Men's tennis (8) ===
- Prior to joining the SEC in 2024, Texas won one title in men's tennis (2019).

Year	School
1959	Tulane
1985	Georgia
1987	Georgia
1999	Georgia
2001	Georgia
2007	Georgia
2008	Georgia
2021	Florida

=== Women's tennis (13) ===
- Before joining the SEC in 2024, Texas won four titles in women's tennis (1993, 1995, 2021 and 2022).

Year	School
1992	Florida
1994	Georgia
1996	Florida
1998	Florida
2000	Georgia
2003	Florida
2011	Florida
2012	Florida
2015	Vanderbilt
2017	Florida
2024	Texas A&M
2025	Georgia
2026	Texas A&M

=== Men's golf (16) ===
- Before joining the SEC in 2012, Texas A&M won one national title (in 2009).
- Before joining the SEC in 2024, Oklahoma won two national titles (1989 and 2017).
- Before joining the SEC in 2024, Texas won four national titles (1971, 1972, 2012 and 2022).

Year	School
1940	LSU
1942	LSU
1947	LSU
1955	LSU
1968	Florida
1973	Florida
1993	Florida
1999	Georgia
2001	Florida
2005	Georgia
2013	Alabama
2014	Alabama
2015	LSU
2023	Florida
2024	Auburn
2026	Auburn

=== Women's golf (5) ===
Year	School
1985	Florida
1986	Florida
2001	Georgia
2012	Alabama
2021	Ole Miss

=== Women's rowing (1) ===
The SEC did not sponsor women's rowing until 2024–25, announcing the addition of the sport shortly after Oklahoma and Texas joined. The two new members were joined in the inaugural SEC rowing lineup by charter members Alabama and Tennessee. Texas won three NCAA titles before joining the SEC (2021, 2022, 2024).

Year	School
2026	Texas

== Defunct NCAA championships ==
=== Men's boxing (1) ===
Year	School
1949	LSU

== NCAA emerging sports ==
=== Equestrian (18) ===
- The NCAA does not yet sanction a championship for Equestrian. The following is a list of non-NCAA championships won by SEC schools. The SEC began sponsoring equestrian as a conference sport during the 2012–13 school year, with Auburn, Georgia, South Carolina and Texas A&M participating.
- The list of national champions on the SEC website only includes championships won since the conference first sponsored the sport. This table includes all championships won by schools that were SEC members at the time of the championship.
- Before joining the SEC in 2012, Texas A&M won two national titles (in 2002 and 2012).

Year	School
2003	Georgia
2004	Georgia
2005	South Carolina
2006	Auburn
2007	South Carolina
2008	Georgia
2009	Georgia
2010	Georgia
2011	Auburn
2013	Auburn
2014	Georgia
2015	South Carolina
2016	Auburn
2017	Texas A&M
2018	Auburn
2019	Auburn
2021	Georgia
2025	Georgia
2026	South Carolina

Equestrian is the only current emerging sport sponsored by the SEC. No SEC member sponsors a varsity team in any of the other three current emerging sports—flag football, rugby (union), or triathlon. Two other sports, acrobatics & tumbling and stunt, graduated from "emerging" status in January 2026, with the first championships to be held in 2026–27; the only SEC member with a varsity team in either sport is Kentucky, which sponsors stunt.

== NCAA team championships ==
Through June 30, 2024

School	Total	NCAA Men's	NCAA Women's	NCAA Co-ed	Nickname
University of Texas at Austin	57	27	30	0	Longhorns
University of Arkansas	52	43	9	0	Razorbacks
Louisiana State University	47	20	27	0	Tigers
University of Florida	49	26	23	0	Gators
University of Oklahoma	40	24	16	0	Sooners
University of Georgia	35	10	25	0	Bulldogs
University of Alabama	10	2	8	0	Crimson Tide
University of Tennessee	17	7	10	0	Volunteers
Auburn University	15	9	6	0	Tigers
University of Kentucky	14	8	2	4	Wildcats
Texas A&M University	14	6	8	0	Aggies
University of South Carolina	6	2	4	0	Gamecocks
Vanderbilt University	6	2	4	0	Commodores
University of Mississippi	2	1	1	0	Rebels
University of Missouri	2	2	0	0	Tigers
Mississippi State University	1	1	0	0	Bulldogs

The table above ranks the current SEC schools by the number of NCAA recognized national championships each school has won. This does not include Division I-A/FBS football championships, equestrian championships, or unofficial championships in other sports such as men's basketball. However, it does include AIAW titles, which the NCAA has retroactively recognized as equivalent to its own national championships. The totals below include any championships that may have been won before the school was a member of the SEC.

In addition, some recognized national championships are in sports that are not (or were not) sponsored by the SEC:

- Kentucky's total includes four championships in rifle, which the SEC has never sponsored.
- Vanderbilt's total includes three national titles in women's bowling, another sport yet to be sponsored by the SEC.
