= Georgia Bulldogs equestrian =

Georgia Bulldogs Equestrian
- Founded: 2001
- University: University of Georgia
- Athletic director: Josh Brooks
- Head coach: Meghan Boenig (17th season)
- Conference: Southeastern Conference
- Home arena: UGA Equestrian Complex
- Nickname: Bulldogs
- Colors: Red and Black

National championships
- 2003, 2004, 2008, 2009, 2010, 2014, 2021, 2025

Conference championships
- 2015, 2017, 2018

The Georgia Bulldogs equestrian team represents the University of Georgia in the NCAA Division I emerging equestrian sport. This program is as part of the National Collegiate Equestrian Association.

== NCAA National Team Championships ==
The team has won 8 National Championships.

Year	Location
2003	College Station, Texas
2004	Conyers, Georgia
2008	Waco, Texas
2009	Waco, Texas
2010	Waco, Texas
2014	Waco, Texas
2021	Waco, Texas
2025	Ocala, Florida

== Facilities ==
The team began competing in the 109-acre UGA Equestrian Complex, located in Bishop, Georgia in January 2009. This location was previously High Point Farm which originally opened in 1993. In 1996, the site served as training site for the U.S. Dressage Team. As of 2017, the UGA property in Bishop housed sixty horses.
