= McGarity =

McGarity is a surname. Notable people with the surname include:

- Greg McGarity (born 1954), American athletic director
- Jack McGarity (1897–1974), Australian rules footballer
- Lou McGarity (1917–1971), American jazz musician
- Vernon McGarity (1921–2013), United States Army soldier
- Wane McGarity (born 1976), American football player
