= Josh Brooks =

American college sports administrator (born 1980)

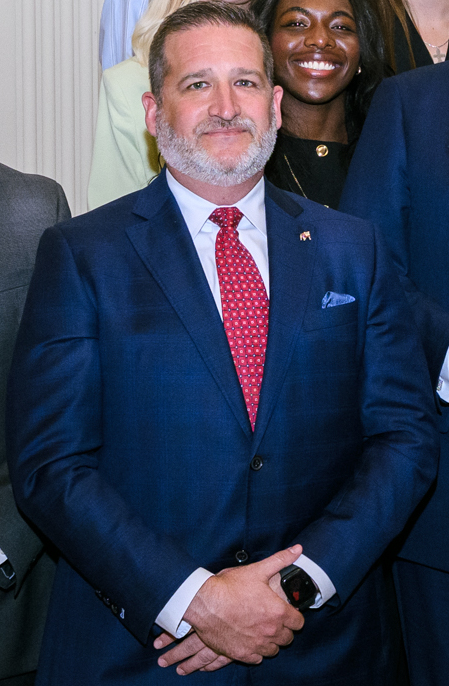
- Brooks in 2026

Current position
- Title: Athletic director
- Team: Georgia
- Conference: SEC

Biographical details
- Born: May 28, 1980 (age 46); Hammond, Louisiana, U.S.
- Education: Louisiana State University (BS); University of Georgia (MS)

Administrative career (AD unless noted)
- 2004–2008: Louisiana–Monroe (director of football operations)
- 2008–2011: Georgia (director of football operations)
- 2012–2014: Georgia (associate AD)
- 2014–2015: Millsaps
- 2015–2016: Louisiana–Monroe (deputy AD)
- 2016–2017: Georgia (executive EAD)
- 2018: Georgia (deputy AD)
- 2019–2020: Georgia (senior deputy AD)
- 2021–present: Georgia

Joshua Gordon Brooks (born May 28, 1980) is an American university sports administrator who is athletic director at the University of Georgia, and previously Millsaps College.

== Early years and education ==
Josh Brooks was born on May 28, 1980, in Hammond, Louisiana. He graduated from LSU with a degree in kinesiology and completed his master's degree in sports management at the University of Georgia.

== Athletic director ==
=== Millsaps College ===
After stints at Louisiana-Monroe and Georgia, Brooks became the athletic director at Millsaps College, a Division III school located in Jackson, Mississippi.

=== University of Georgia ===
In 2016, Brooks went to the University of Georgia to serve as executive associate director of athletics. Over the course of the next 5 years, Brooks was promoted three times. In 2018, Brooks became a deputy athletic director, and in 2019 became the senior deputy athletic director. In 2021, following the departure of Greg McGarity, Brooks became the athletic director for the University of Georgia. In his first two years as athletic director, Georgia won back-to-back national championships in football in 2021 and 2022.

== Personal life ==
Brooks is married to his wife, Lillie, and they have three sons together: James, Jackson, and Davis.
