= Berry College =

Private college in Mount Berry, Georgia, US

- Former names: Boys Industrial School (1902–1926); Martha Berry School for Girls (1909–1926)
- Motto: Not to be ministered unto, but to minister
- Type: Private university
- Religious affiliation: Non-denominational Christian
- Endowment: $1.47 billion (2025)
- President: Sandeep Mazumder
- Faculty: 177 full-time, 46 part-time (2024 fall)
- Students: 2,484 (2024 fall)
- Undergraduates: 2,254 (2024 fall)
- Postgraduates: 230 (2024 fall)
- Location: Mount Berry, Georgia; 34.290°N 85.189°W
- Campus: more than 27,000 acres (110 km^{2}); Rural
- Colors: (Blue, light blue, and silver)
- Sporting affiliations: NCAA Division III – SAA
- Mascot: Victor the Viking
- Website: berry.edu

Berry College is a private university in the Mount Berry community adjacent to Rome, Georgia, United States. It is accredited by the Southern Association of Colleges and Schools (SACS). Berry College was founded on values based on Christian principles in 1902 by Martha Berry.

== History ==
Berry student life in the 1950s

In 1902, Martha Berry, daughter of a prominent local business owner, founded the "Boys Industrial School" on 83 acres of land inherited from her father. In exchange for an education, students of the school would work to help build, run, and maintain the new school. In 1904, it became the first approved school of the Daughters of the American Revolution. In 1909, the "Martha Berry School for Girls" was added, and collectively with the boys school, it came to be known as the Berry Schools.

The free labor provided by the students helped to keep construction and operating costs for the schools low. In 1926, the school became a junior college and several years later, a senior college, graduating its first class in 1932. During the 1930s, the school campus grew to 30,000 acres, helped by a large donation from Henry Ford. In 1957, Berry College became accredited by the SACS. During the 1960s, Berry College began paying student workers instead of crediting accounts and ended mandatory religious services for students.

== Academics ==
Berry College offers Bachelor of Arts, Bachelor of Music, Bachelor of Science, Master of Business Administration, Master of Education, and Education Specialist degrees from the four schools making up its academic program. It is accredited by the Southern Association of Colleges and Schools (SACS). The student-faculty ratio at Berry College is 11:1, and the school has 58.9% of its classes with fewer than 20 students, and 99.6% of its classes with fewer than 50 students. The average freshman retention rate, an indicator of student satisfaction, is 83%. U.S. News & World Report in its 2021 Best Colleges ranks Berry College #4 in Regional Universities South, #3 in Best Undergraduate Teaching, and #1 in Best Value Schools.

=== Undergraduate programs ===
Berry offers degrees in the following schools:

- Campbell School of Business
- Charter School of Education and Human Sciences
- Evans School of Humanities, Arts and Social Sciences
- School of Mathematical and Natural Sciences

A minor degree can be obtained in 36 different courses of study throughout the four schools. Berry also offers an undergraduate degree in interdisciplinary studies.

=== Honors Program ===
Berry's Honors Program is an undergraduate program designed to give qualified students a chance to learn in an intellectually challenging environment with their peers and professors. The Honors Program allows the students to take Honors-only classes, Honorized classes, and to study abroad in Honors-only programs. During their last year at Berry, Honors students must complete and defend a senior thesis. Upon graduation, they receive an Honors diploma.

=== Graduate programs ===
Berry offers a Master of Arts in Teaching program and an Education Specialist certification in the Charter School of Education and Human Sciences that is accredited by the National Council for Teacher Education (NCATE).

The Campbell School of Business offers a Master of Business Administration program that is accredited by the Association to Advance Collegiate Schools of Business (AACSB).

=== Admissions ===
In 2021, Berry College accepted 77% of all applicants. Admitted students have an average GPA of 3.7, a mean ACT score of 27 and a mean SAT score of 1175.

=== Berry College Elementary and Middle School ===
Berry College Elementary and Middle School is a private school located on Berry College's mountain campus across from Frost Chapel. Established in 1977, the school was initially called the Berry College Academy, educating a variety of students from preschool to high school. The academy was meant to follow British infant school practices. Using a Lilly Foundation Grant, the school was called the Early Learning Center in the Westcott Building and taught kindergarten and first grade students. Furthermore, the high school students were engaged in Bible study.

Berry abruptly closed the academy in 1983, and all 144 students left to attend school elsewhere. In 1988, the school moved locations from the Westcott Building to Hamrick Hall, where it is now located. By this time the age range had expanded to teach children up until fifth grade. Since 2002, it has enrolled students in up to the eighth grade. A year later, the older students were moved from Hamrick Hall to the newly built Cook Building on Main Campus to form their own separate middle school. A series of reunion events were held for former students, parents, teachers and directors in 2007 for the thirty year anniversary. The names of the schools were merged into one, Berry College Elementary and Middle School.

In 2015, the school was home to 129 elementary and middle school students with a 1:12 teacher to student ratio. During the 180 days in the school year, the students attend class for seven hours compared to the normal six for other elementary schools in the area. The Middle Schoolers were also known for annually producing short films, with the eighth graders receiving a "Martha" award for their achievements.

== Campus ==
Berry College is situated near the city of Rome in northwestern Georgia, 59 miles (95 km) northwest of Atlanta, Georgia, and 53 miles (85 km) south of Chattanooga, Tennessee. The campus consists of more than 27,000 acres of land - including fields, forests, and Lavender Mountain - making it the largest contiguous college campus in the world. Designated portions are open to the public for hiking, cycling, horseback riding, and other outdoor activities. The campus is also home to a large population of deer (estimates range between 1,500 and 2,500).

The Georgia Department of Natural Resources oversees about 16,000 acres of the campus, conducts managed hunts, and provides recreational opportunities. The land encompassing the academic buildings and other public spaces is a wildlife refuge in which no hunting is allowed. In September 2011, Travel+Leisure ranked Berry among the most beautiful college campuses in the United States, noting its numerous fountains and pools among its English Gothic-style buildings.

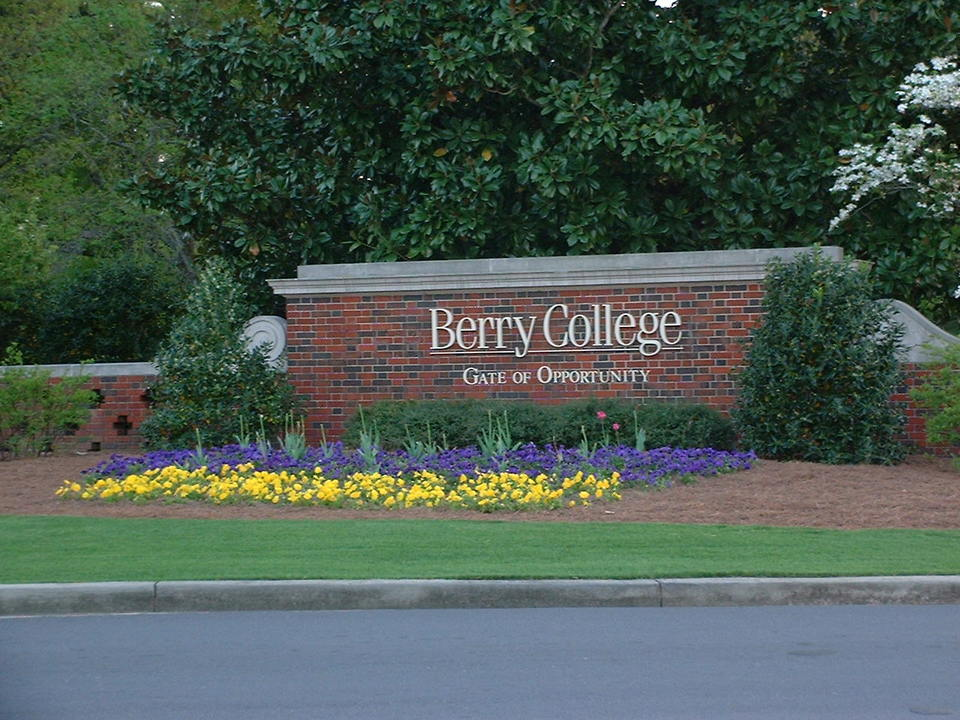
The "Gate of Opportunity" is the main entrance to the campus

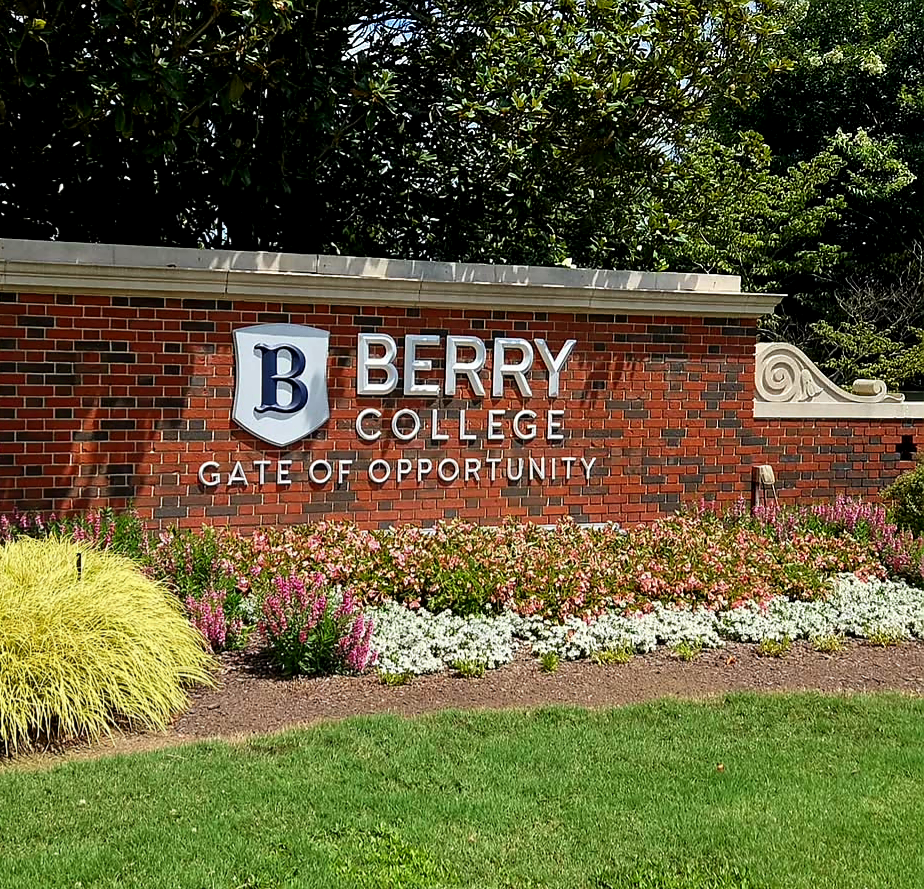
Berry Gate of Opportunity updated 2024

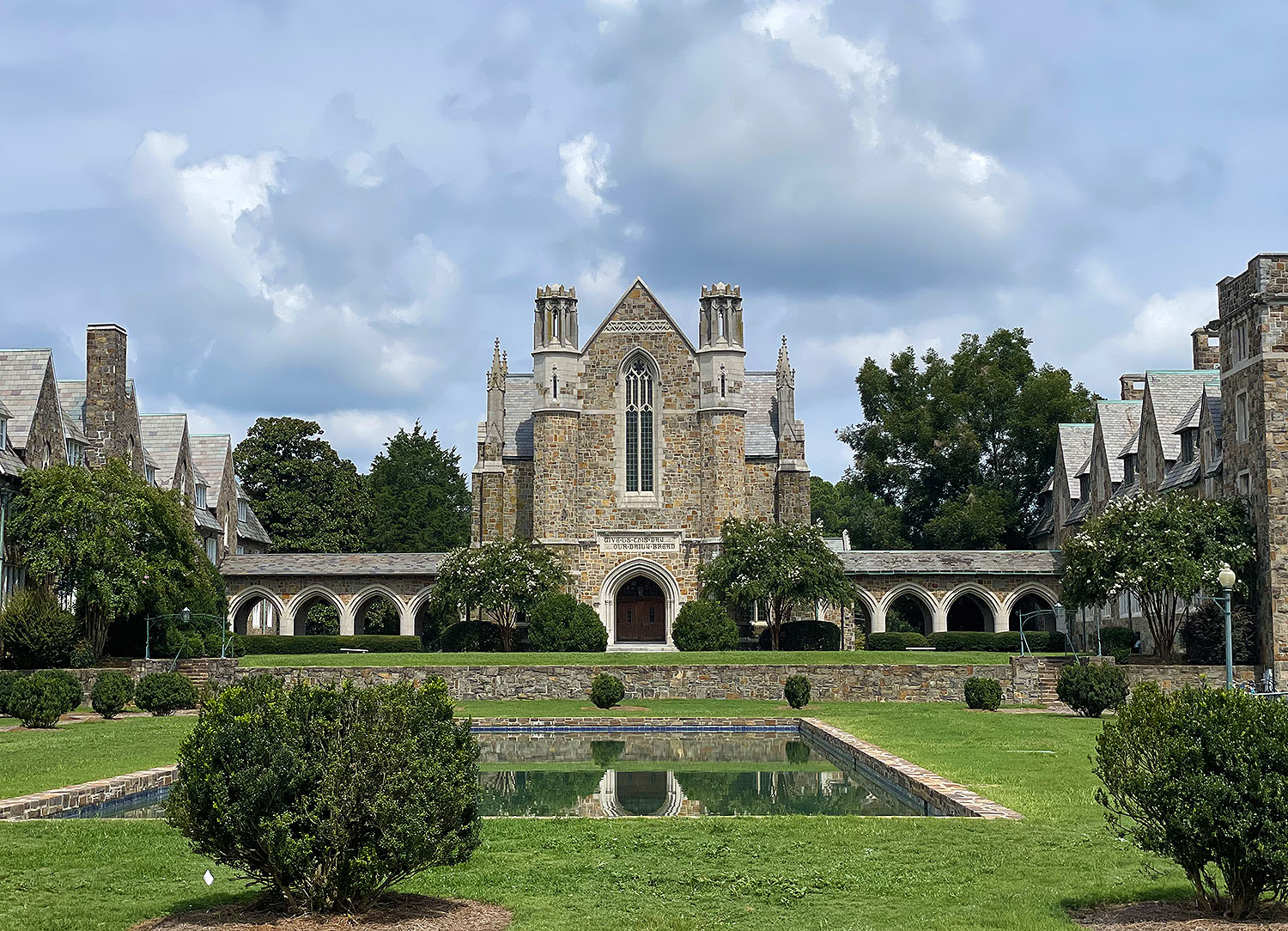
The reflecting pools in front of the Ford Dining Hall

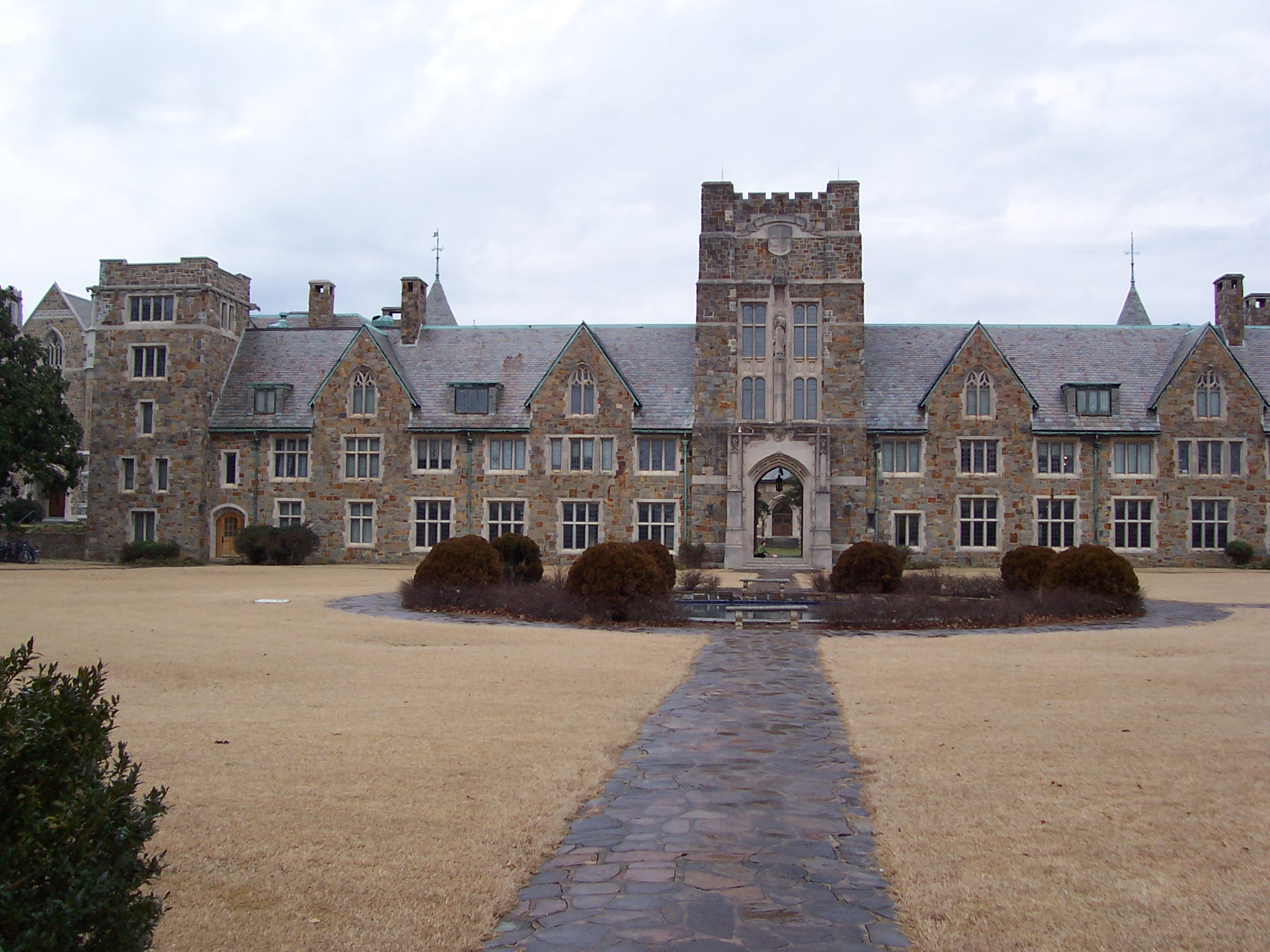
West Mary Hall

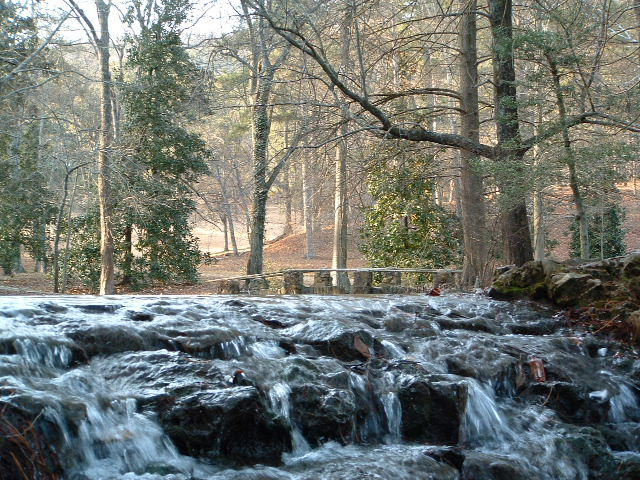
Mirror Lake on the Mountain Campus

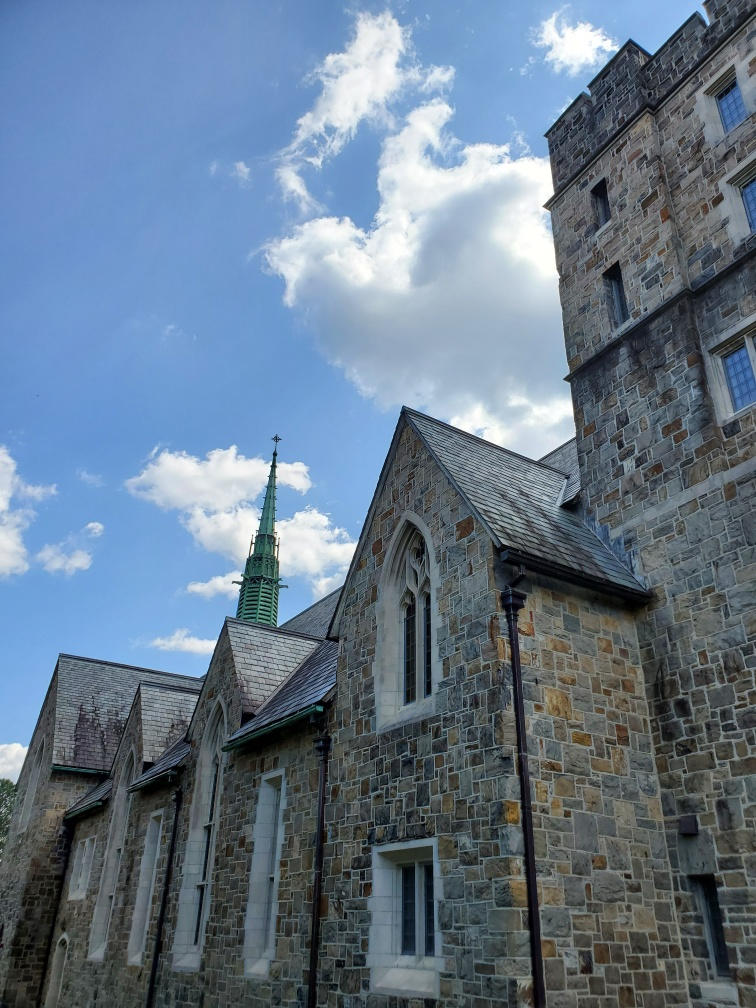
Ford Buildings

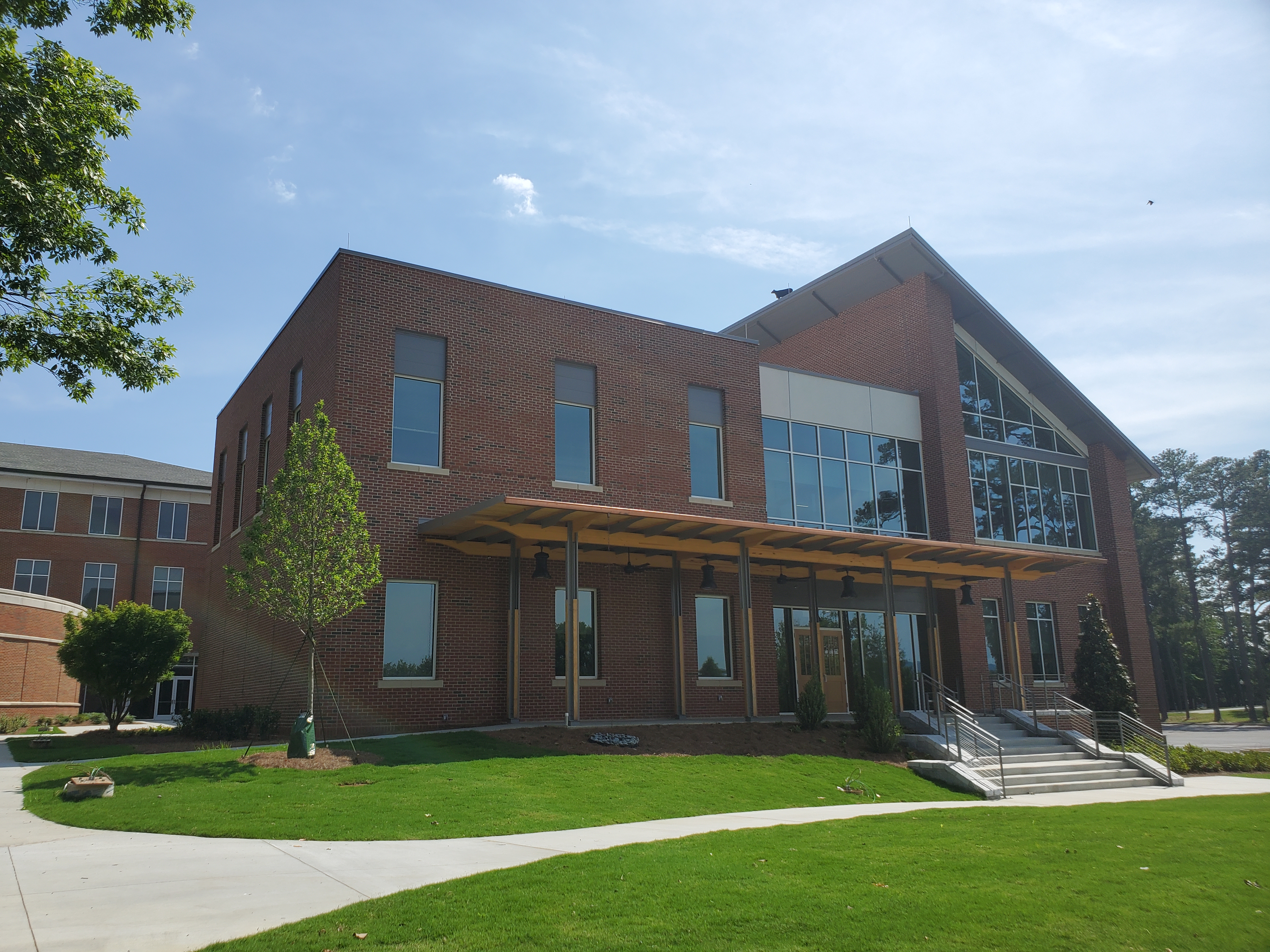
Animal Science Center at Briggs Hall

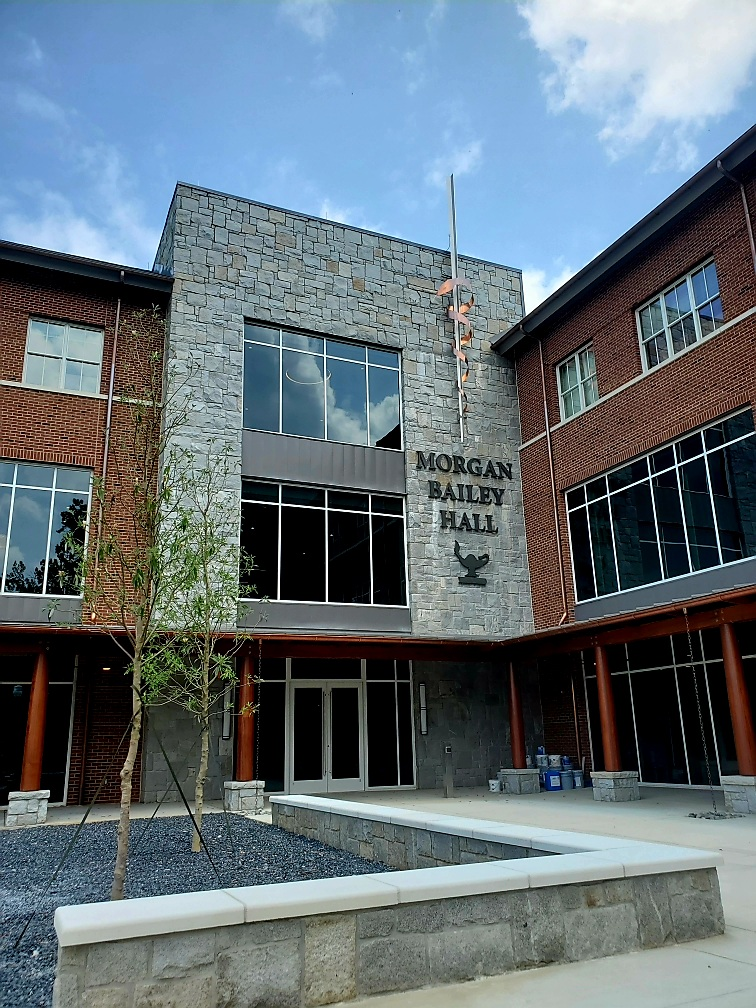
Morgan-Bailey Health Sciences Center

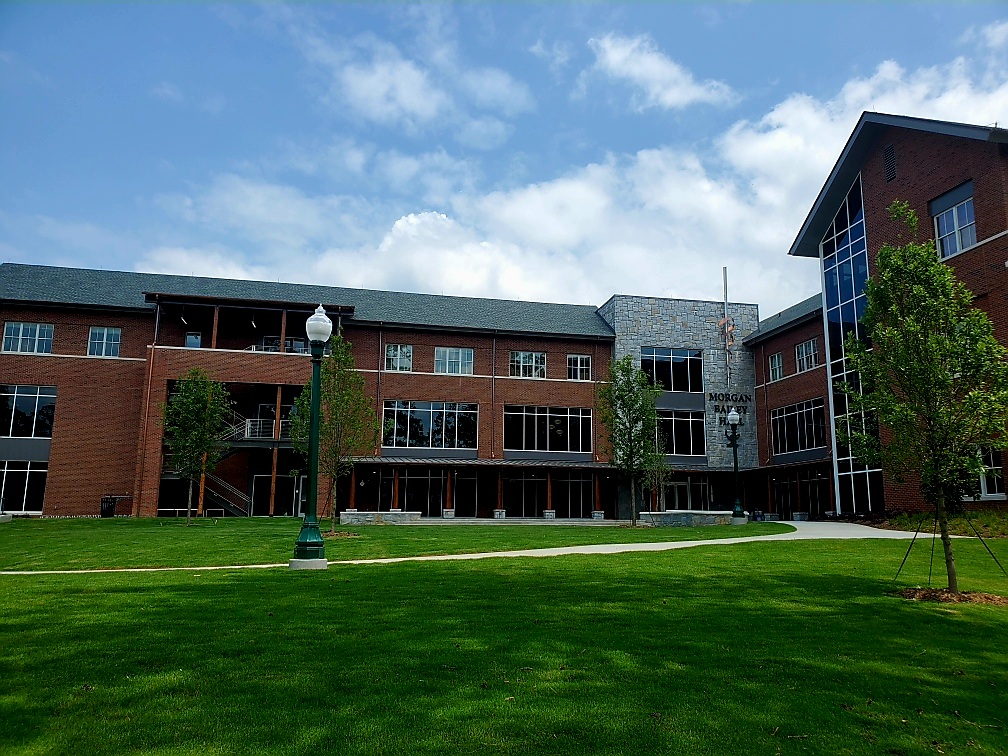
Morgan-Bailey Health Sciences Center

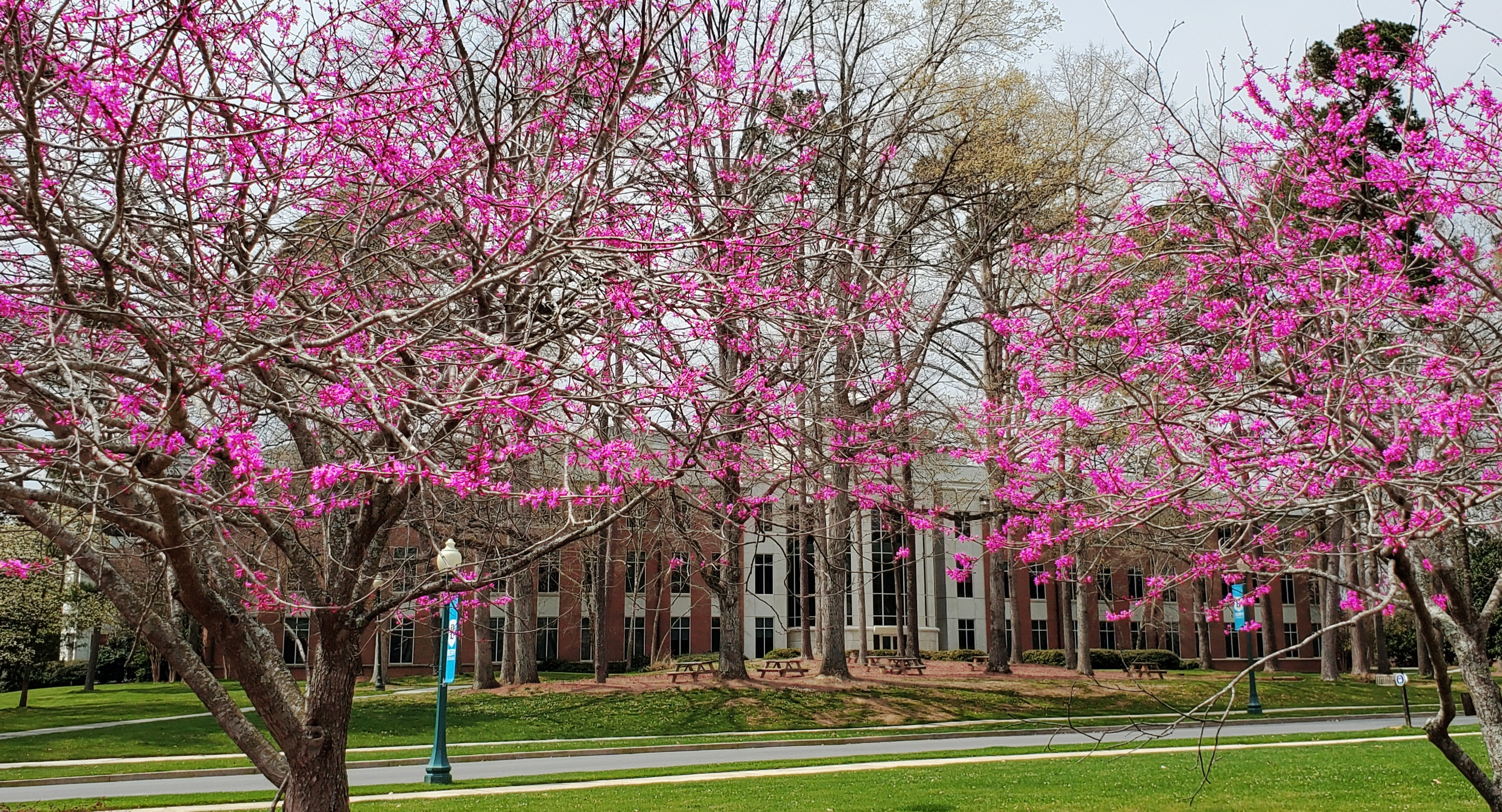
McAllister Hall

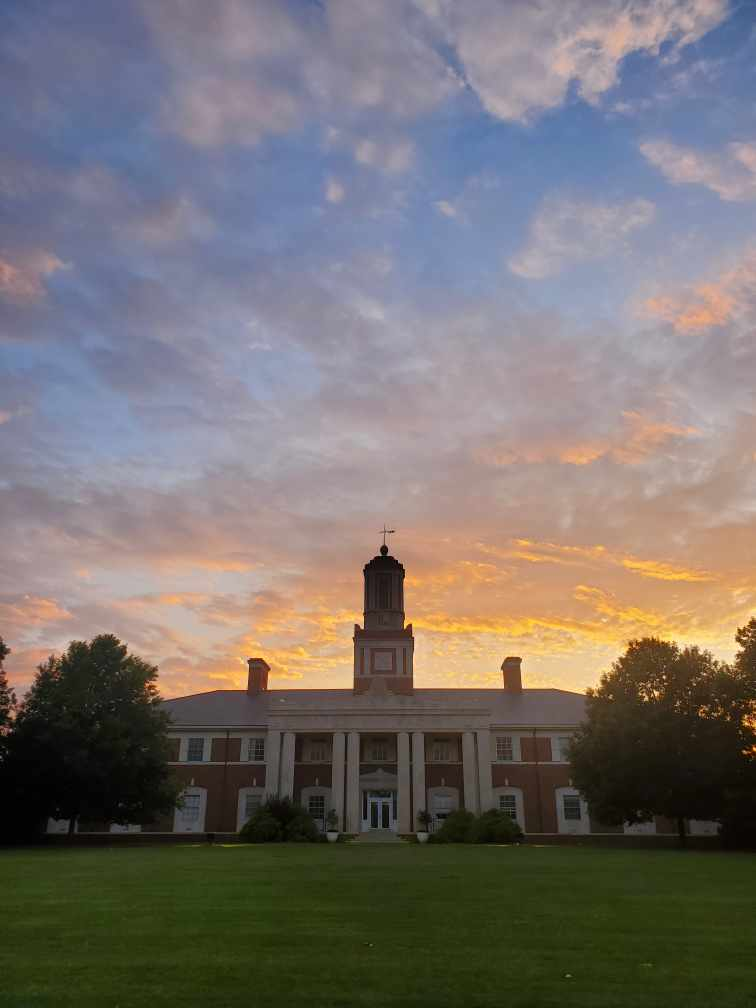
Hermann Hall

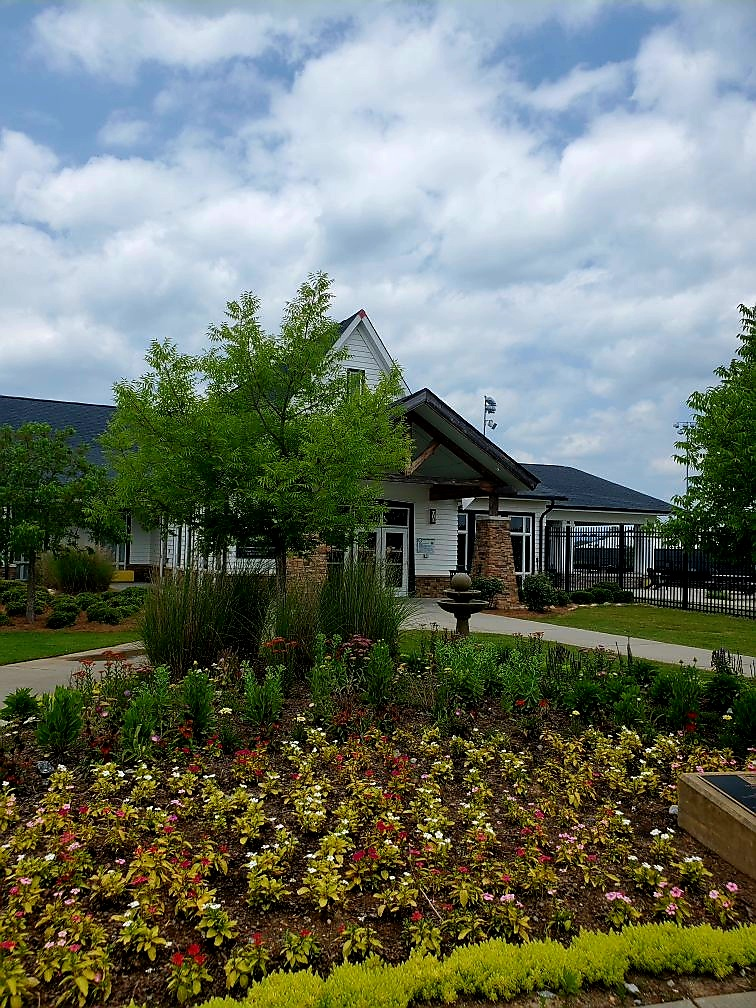
Rome Tennis Center at Berry College

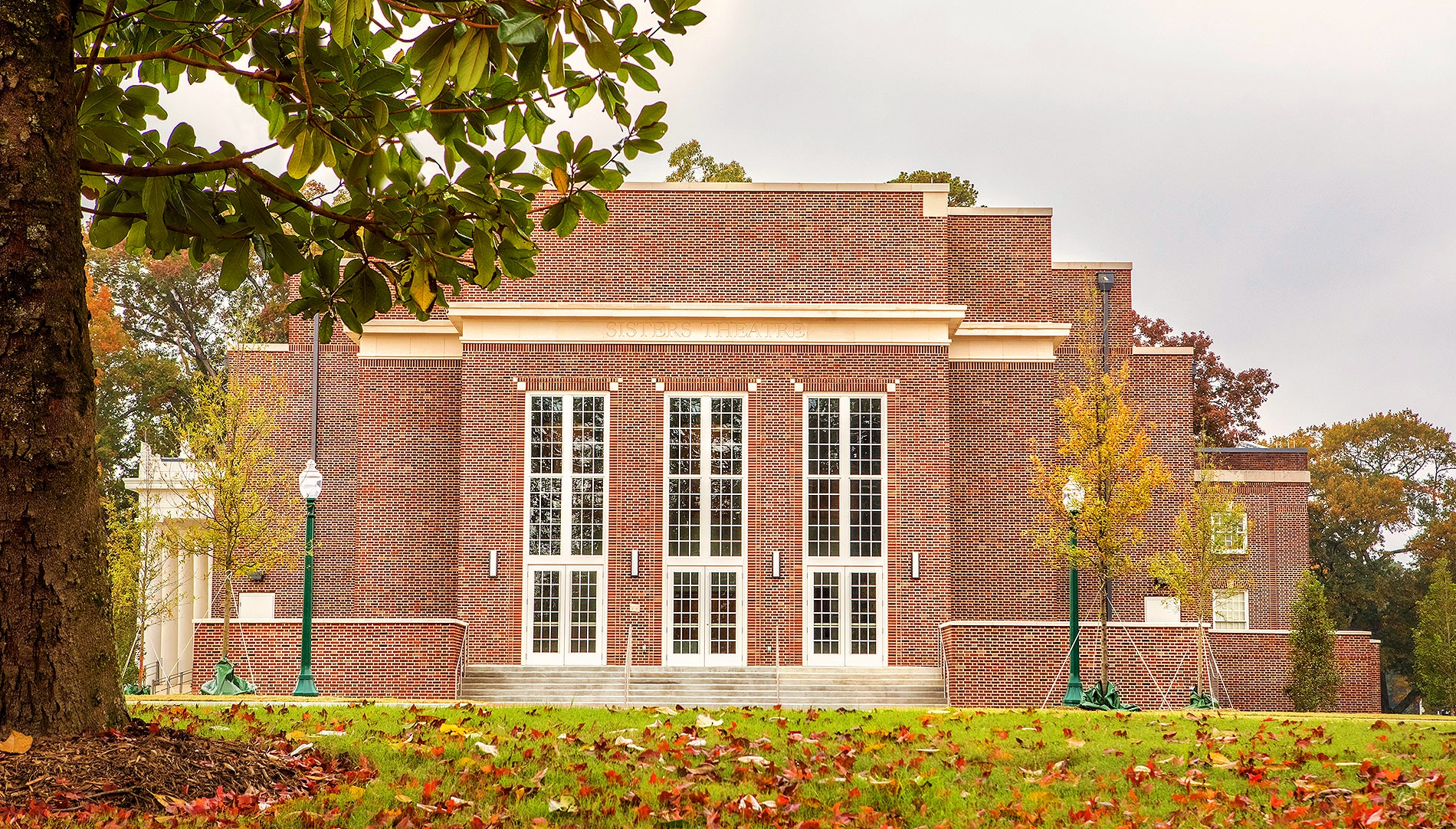
Sisters Theatre at Blackstone Hall

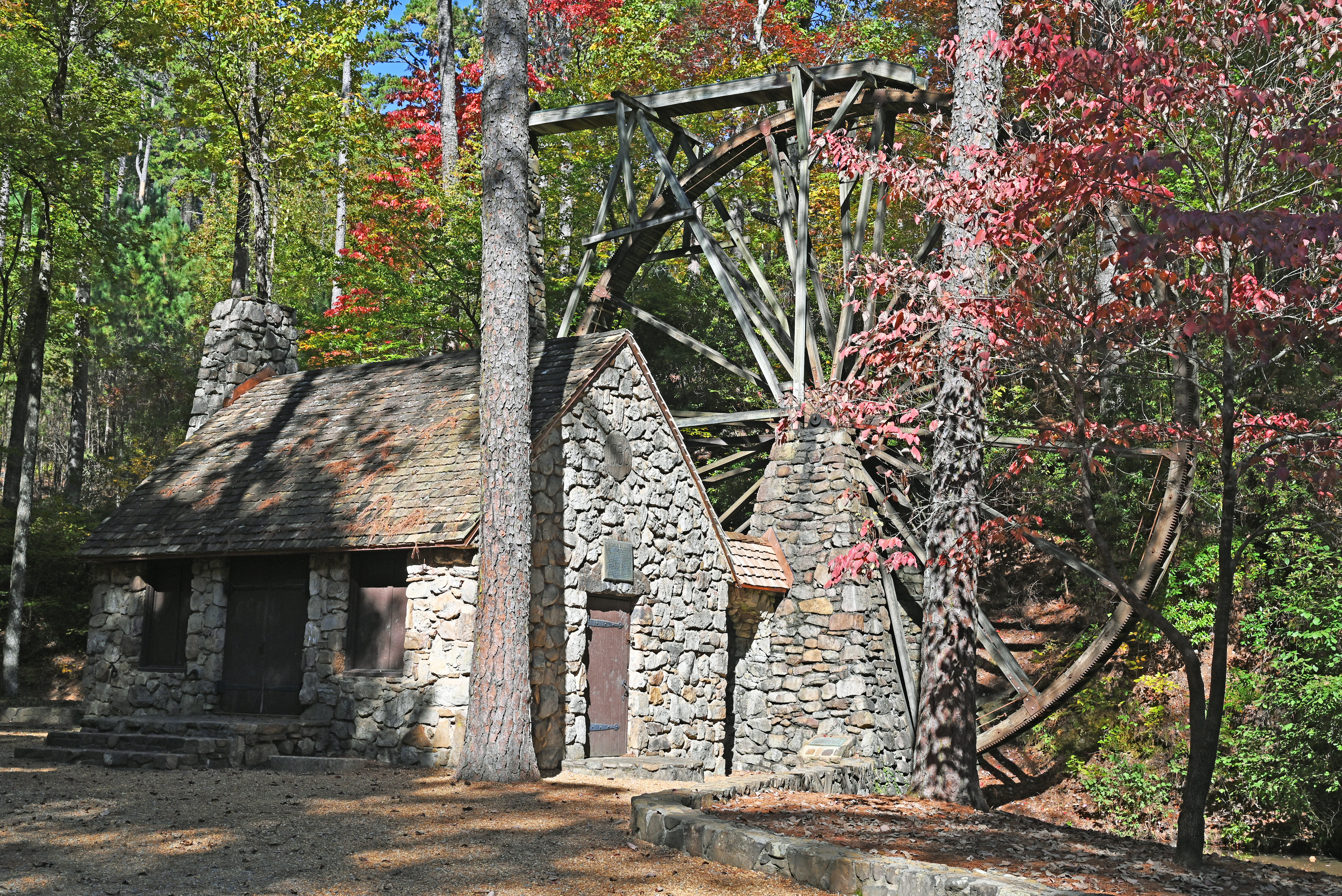
Old Mill

== Student life ==
Berry College has a total of 1,943 undergraduate students for the 2019–2020 academic year. There are 91 graduate students. There is a 66:34 female to male ratio, and 69 percent of the students are in-state residents. Students come from 35 states and at least 18 foreign countries.

=== Outdoor recreation ===
Berry College has more than 80 miles of hiking, biking and horseback riding trails, and two disc golf courses; all are open to the Berry community and to the public. The Victory Lake Campground located in the heart of Berry's campus is available to Berry student use only. Berry offers an intramural program with men, women and co-educational play for many sports.

=== LifeWorks program ===
Berry College's student work program, called LifeWorks, guarantees every student a job on campus for those interested in participating. The work program is based upon the original idea the school was formed around. The founder, Martha Berry, would educate local children for free if they would work around campus. This continues to help offset the tuition cost to this day.

=== Film and television ===
Berry College has been used as a site for the filming of several movies, in addition to music videos by bands such as Casting Crowns. The most notable films are Remember the Titans and Sweet Home Alabama. Disney's Perfect Harmony (1991) was filmed almost entirely on campus at buildings such as Oak Hill, Frost Chapel, the Old Mill, and the Ford Buildings. A short scene from Dutch was filmed on the Berry campus. In addition, scenes for the Fox series, The Following, starring Kevin Bacon, were filmed here. In the Constantine television series, the Ford Buildings and the Old Mill were used as the settings for Ravenscar Asylum and John Constantine's hideout, respectively. The Netflix Original Stranger Things filmed parts of its fourth season at the Ford Complex.

=== Religious life ===
Berry College's mission statement espouses "values based on Christian principles". The institution's board of trustees chose to shutter the middle and high school academy, and used that campus property to court leadership of Chick-fil-A, a Christian-run business, through its WinShape foundation programs. The campus has a chaplain, four chapels, and an active religion-in-life program supporting all Christian denominations and religions outside of Christianity. The school recognizes the Student Association for an Inter-Religious Community, which is a student organization that encourages dialogue between religions represented on campus.

=== Campus housing ===
Berry College has housing for employees.

Faculty housing on the Berry College property is zoned to Floyd County School District for public school (for dependents of college employees living on the property). The zoned secondary schools for Berry College's housing are Armuchee Middle School and Armuchee High School.

== Athletics ==
Berry athletics logo

The Berry athletic teams are called the Vikings. The institution is a member of the Division III level of the National Collegiate Athletic Association (NCAA), primarily competing in the Southern Athletic Association (SAA) as a founding member since the 2012–13 academic year. The Vikings previously competed as an NCAA D-III Independent from 2010–11 to 2011–12; and in the Southern States Athletic Conference (SSAC); formerly known as Georgia–Alabama–Carolina Conference (GACC) until after the 2003–04 school year) of the National Association of Intercollegiate Athletics (NAIA) from 2004–05 to 2009–10. The school's mascot is the Viking.

Berry competes in 22 intercollegiate varsity sports. Men's sports include baseball, basketball, cross country, football, golf, lacrosse, soccer, swimming & diving, tennis and track & field; women's sports include basketball, beach volleyball, cross country, equestrian, golf, lacrosse, soccer, softball, swimming & diving, tennis, track & field and volleyball.

=== Championships ===
Berry has won three NAIA national championships in women's soccer (1987, 1990 and 1993), one national title in women's basketball (1976), one NAIA national crown in men's golf (1998), and three IHSA national championships in equestrian (2011, 2015, 2016). In addition, Berry student-athletes Michelle Abernathy (marathon, 1999), Caio Soares (3,000 meter race-walk, 2004), Michelle Tuggle (high jump, 1984) and Nicole Wildes (women's golf, 2004) have all won individual national championships. The Berry College women's basketball team won the AIAW Small College National Championship in 1976.

In 2018, Elijah Hirsh in men's basketball broke the single-game record for blocks in Berry's NCAA Division III era with 10 blocks. In 2019, he averaged 9.2 rebounds (leading the SAA) and was named SAA Player of the Year, SAA All-First Team, and National Association of Basketball Coaches All-District South First Team.

=== Addition of football ===
The Berry College Board of Trustees voted to add football beginning in the fall of 2013, with a track and field athletic program to be added soon after. Due to the financial expense and the traditions of the school, the decision to add football was controversial and met with opposition from a significant portion of the student body, faculty, and alumni. According to the school newspaper, The Campus Carrier, adding football would not affect issues related to equal sports opportunity under the Title IX regulations.

=== Facilities ===
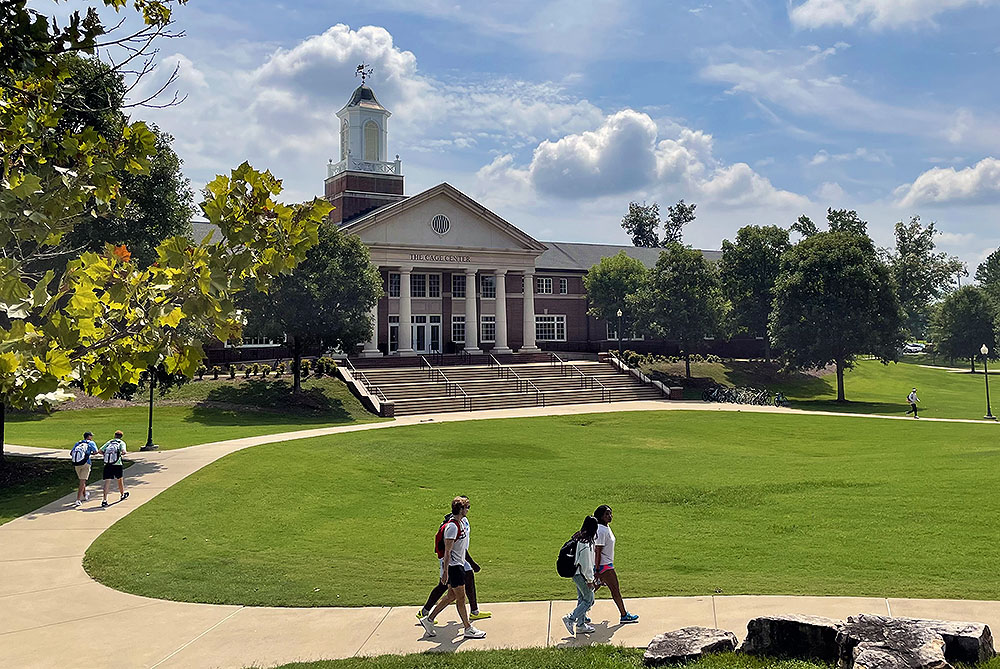
Steven J. Cage Athletics and Recreation Center

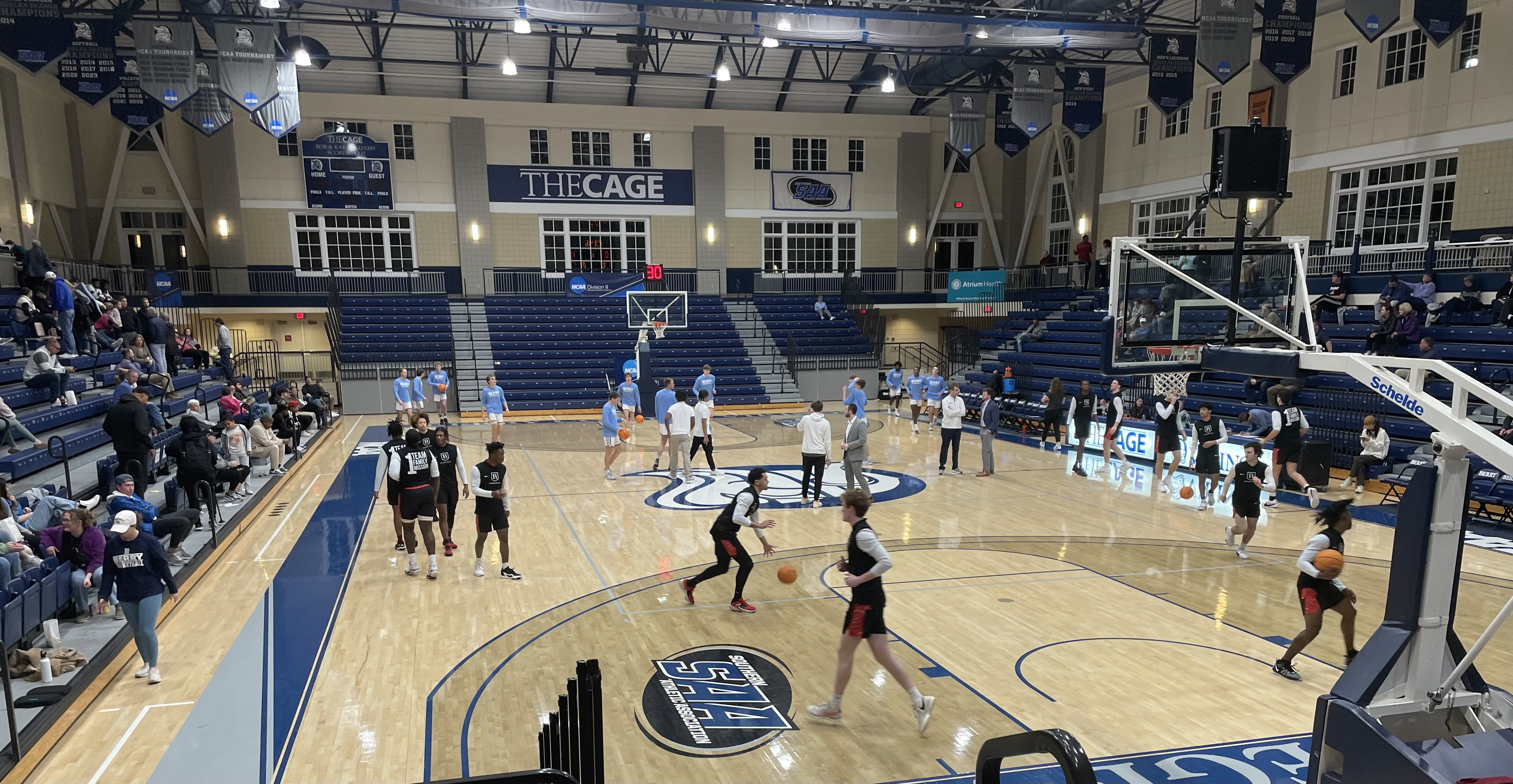
The interior of the Cage Center gymnasium

The college's stadium, known as "Valhalla", is used by the football, track, and lacrosse programs.

The stadium was originally intended to be built near the Cage Center, but in 2012 a pair of bald eagles established their nest near the site. They returned and successfully raised chicks in 2013 and 2014. The school moved the stadium site to a new location well removed from the eagles, which have become a symbol of the school. Groundbreaking was held on October 17, 2014, and the stadium was completed for the 2015 football season.

The Cage Center is Berry's 131,000-square-foot athletic facility that houses a performance gymnasium, a natatorium with observation seating, a fitness center, racquetball courts, an indoor track and classrooms. The Cage was named after Berry College alumnus and trustee Steven Cage, whose $10 million donation kicked off the project.

== Notable alumni ==
- Darren Barnet, actor
- Ashley Herring Blake, author
- Mark Bloom, professional soccer player
- Meghan Boenig, head coach of the women's equestrian varsity program at the University of Georgia
- Morgan Church, head coach of the U.S. Women's National Beach Soccer Team
- Vincent L. Griffith, rear admiral in the United States Navy
- Elijah Hirsh, professional basketball player
- Josh Hughes, professional soccer player
- John Junkins, professor and former interim president of Texas A&M University
- Mason Kinsey, professional football player
- Collin McHugh, professional baseball player
- Heather Willauer, chemist and inventor

== Demographics ==
Berry College
- Census-designated place
- Location within Georgia Location within the United States
- Country: United States
- State: Georgia
- County: Floyd
- Elevation: 614 ft (187 m)

Population (2020)
  - Total: 1,565
- Time zone: UTC−5 (Eastern (EST))
- GNIS feature ID: 2806017

Berry College CDP is a census-designated place (CDP), and the official name for an area covering the Berry College campus, in Floyd County, Georgia, United States.

It first appeared as a CDP in the 2020 Census with a population of 1,565.

Historical population
Census	Pop.	Note	%±
2020	1,565		—
U.S. Decennial Census; 2020

=== 2020 census ===
Berry College CDP, Georgia – racial and ethnic composition Note: the US Census treats Hispanic/Latino as an ethnic category. This table excludes Latinos from the racial categories and assigns them to a separate category. Hispanics/Latinos may be of any race.
Race / ethnicity	Pop 2020	% 2020
White alone (NH)	1,228	78.47%
Black or African American alone (NH)	122	7.80%
Native American or Alaska Native alone (NH)	3	0.19%
Asian alone (NH)	36	2.30%
Pacific Islander alone (NH)	1	0.06%
Other race alone (NH)	60	3.83%
Mixed-race or multiracial (NH)	3	0.19%
Hispanic or Latino (any race)	112	7.16%
Total	1,565	100.00%
NH = Non-Hispanic

== See also ==
- Georgia Governor's Honors Program
- Viking Fusion
