= Viking Fusion =

- Website type: Student Media
- Website: Viking Fusion
- Commercial: No
- Registration: Optional
- Launched: 2008
- Current status: Active

Viking Fusion is the student media website for Berry College that seeks (1) to serve the department of communication courses as a platform for student productions, and (2) to inform and entertain both the Berry student community and the larger public, even beyond Berry College. Content on the site is exclusively authored and produced by Berry College students. The views expressed on Viking Fusion are not necessarily those of Berry College's board of trustees, the administration, or the department of communication.

Viking Fusion is powered by concrete5, an open-source content management system.

== Awards ==
- 2009 National Student Production Awards Winner
- 2010 College Broadcasters, Inc. Production Awards Finalist - "Best Student Media Website"
- 2011 Southeast Emmy Awards Achievement: Television Student Production Excellence - Student Production - College
- 2011 College Broadcasters, Inc. Production Awards Finalist - "Best Student Media Website"
- 2011 Editor & Publisher EPPY Awards - "Best College University Journalism Website"
