= Howell Hollis =

Howell T. Hollis (March 18, 1903 – March 11, 1991) was a football player, football and golf coach and administrator at the University of Georgia. As the men's golf coach from 1946 – 1970 his teams won 13 Southeastern Conference championships.

Hollis played football for the Georgia Bulldogs in 1924–26 as a quarterback, placekicker and kick returner. He coached high school football 1927-36 and began his college coaching at Georgia in 1937 where he was freshman coach until 1942. Hollis served in the Navy during World War II. After the war ended in 1945, he returned to coaching at the University of Georgia. He was named coach for the men's golf team in 1946. During his tenure, Hollis took 13 of his 25 teams to the NCAA Championships, which included eight top-10 finishes. Hollis' Bulldog teams claimed 13 Southeastern Conference titles (1950–52,1957–59,1961–65,1969–70), and he had 10 individual conference champions. The first of those, George Hamer, also won the NCAA Championship in 1946.

Hollis also served Georgia athletics as business manager 1948–1968, assistant athletic director 1950–71, and acting athletic director March–November 1963.

Hollis was inducted into the Georgia Sports Hall of Fame on February 16, 1973. The university hands out an award in his name every year to the golfer with the highest grade point average.

== See also ==
- List of Georgia Bulldogs championships
