= Vincent L. Griffith =

United States Navy Rear admiral

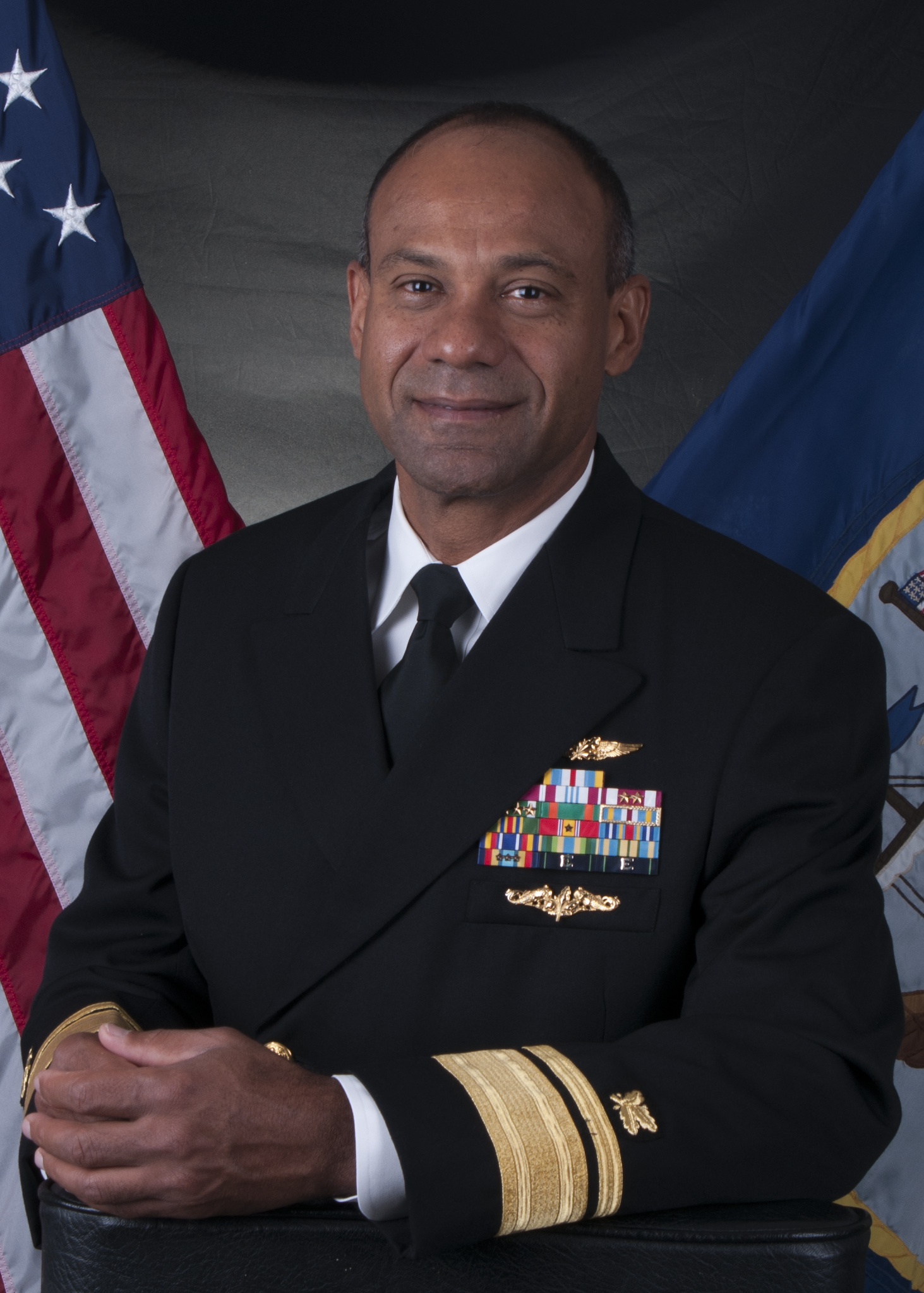
- Vincent L. Griffith as rear admiral October 2013
- Born: Vincent Lafayette Griffith
- Military career
- Allegiance: United States
- Branch: U.S. Navy
- Service years: 1982–2017
- Rank: Rear Admiral
- Awards: Defense Superior Service Medal; Legion of Merit; Defense Meritorious Service Medal; Meritorious Service Medals; Commendation Medal; Achievement Medal; Marksmanship Medal

Vincent L. Griffith is a rear admiral in the United States Navy. He served over thirty years in the Navy, from 1982 to 2017. He was the former director of Defense Logistics Agency operations, was commander of the Naval Supply Systems Command, Global Logistics Support, and later, director of Defense Logistics Agency Aviation.

== Early life ==
In 1981, Griffith graduated from Berry College, receiving a bachelor's degree in Business administration. Later, he attended George Washington University and earned an MBA. He then attended the Advanced Management Program at Emory University.

== Career ==
In 1982, he was commissioned with a junior rank of a commissioned office rEnsign in the Navy Supply Corps. He served supply officer of a fleet ballistic missile submarine and two aircraft carriers such as USS Stonewall Jackson, USS Saratoga and USS John C. Stennis. Griffith was also serving at navy ship Charleston Naval Shipyard for South Carolina and Naval Supply Systems Command unit for Washington, D.C.

He was the commander of the Naval Supply Systems Command, Global Logistics Support, and later, director of Defense Logistics Agency Aviation, commanding officer of the United States Fleet Forces Command for Norfolk, Virginia, and rear admiral. He retired in 2017.

== Awards ==
Government of United States conferred numerous awards upon Vincent, including Defense Superior Service Medal, Legion of Merit, Defense Meritorious Service Medal, Meritorious Service Medals, and five Commendation Medals.
