= Meghan Boenig =

American equestrian coach

Current position
- Title: Head coach
- Team: University of Georgia
- Conference: SEC

Coaching career (HC unless noted)
- 1999-2001: Texas A&M (Asst. Coach)
- 2001-present: University of Georgia

Accomplishments and honors

Championships
- 8 Varsity Equestrian National Championships (2002-2003, 2003-2004, 2007-2008, 2008-2009, 2009-2010, 2013-2014, 2020-2021)

Meghan Boenig is the head coach of the women's equestrian varsity program at the University of Georgia (UGA) in Athens, Georgia, USA. In Boenig's first varsity season (2002–2003) at UGA, the team won the national championship in the Varsity Equestrian National Championships (VENC). She has coached the team to seven additional national championships (2003–2004, 2007–2008, 2008–2009, 2009–2010, 2013–2014, and 2020–2021 2024-2025) and several runner-up finishes.

Boenig graduated from Berry College with a bachelor's degree in biology and animal science in 1999 and was a member of the school's intercollegiate team from 1995 to 1999. While completing her master's degree in equine exercise physiology at Texas A&M University (TAMU), Boening served as assistant coach on the Texas A&M equestrian team. Boenig was named the inaugural UGA Women's equestrian head coach on October 1, 2001.

== Career Review and Honors ==
- 8 NCAA Varsity Equestrian National Championships (VENC) - 2002–2003, 2003–2004, 2007–2008, 2008–2009, 2009–2010, 2013–2014, 2020-2021, 2024-2025
