= Georgia Bulldogs =

Intercollegiate sports teams of University of Georgia

- University: University of Georgia
- Nickname: Bulldogs, 'Dawgs
- NCAA: Division I (FBS)
- Conference: SEC
- Athletic director: Josh Brooks
- Location: Athens, Georgia
- Varsity teams: 21
- Football stadium: Dooley Field at Sanford Stadium
- Basketball arena: Stegeman Coliseum
- Baseball stadium: Foley Field
- Softball stadium: Jack Turner Stadium
- Aquatics center: Gabrielsen Natatorium
- Volleyball arena: Stegeman Coliseum
- Other venues: Spec Towns Track; UGA Equestrian Complex; Turner Soccer Complex
- Colors: Red and black
- Mascot: Uga (live English Bulldog); Hairy Dawg (costumed)
- Fight song: "Hail to Georgia" "Glory, Glory" (de facto)
- Cheer: "Goooo Dawgs" "Sic 'em!"
- Website: georgiadogs.com

The Georgia Bulldogs are the intercollegiate athletic teams that represent the University of Georgia. The Bulldogs compete in NCAA Division I and are members of the Southeastern Conference (SEC). The official mascot is an English Bulldog named Uga, (derived from an abbreviation of the University of Georgia), while the costumed character version of Uga is Hairy Dawg. Most of the school's athletic teams are known as the Bulldogs, with the exception of the women's basketball team, known as the "Lady Bulldogs", the women's gymnastics team, known as the "GymDogs."

The university sponsors twenty-one sports – baseball, men's and women's basketball, men's and women's cross country, women's equestrian, football, men's and women's golf, women's gymnastics, women's soccer, softball, men's and women's swimming and diving, men's and women's tennis, men's and women's track, and women's volleyball. Those 21 teams have won a combined 55 national championships (including 35 NCAA championships) and 186 Southeastern Conference championships (plus 264 individual national championships through the end of the 2013–14 school year). University students have also won 56 Olympic medals. In 2006, the Bulldogs recorded the highest profit margin of any athletic program in the country (according to the EADA report), pulling in $23.9 million.

== Nickname and mascot ==
The first mention of "Bulldogs" in association with Georgia athletics occurred on November 28, 1901, at the Georgia–Auburn football game played in Atlanta. The Georgia fans "had a badge saying 'Eat'em Georgia' and a picture of a bulldog tearing a piece of cloth".

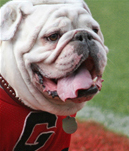
Uga VI the official live mascot of the Georgia Bulldogs from 1999 to 2008.

However, it was not until 1920 that the nickname "Bulldog" was used to describe the athletic teams at the University of Georgia. Traditionally, the choice of a bulldog as the UGA mascot was attributed to the alma mater of its founders and first president, who graduated from Yale University. On November 3, 1920, Morgan Blake, a sportswriter for the Atlanta Journal, wrote a story about school nicknames for football teams and proposed:

The Georgia Bulldogs would sound good because there is a certain dignity about a bulldog, as well as ferocity.

Shortly thereafter, another news story appeared in the Atlanta Constitution in which the name "Bulldogs" was used several times to describe the Georgia football team, and the nickname has been used ever since then.

== Sports sponsored ==
SEC logo in Georgia's colors

Men's sports	Women's sports
Baseball	Basketball
Basketball	Cross country
Cross country	Equestrian
Football	Golf
Golf	Gymnastics
Swimming & diving	Soccer
Tennis	Softball
Track and field^{†}	Swimming & diving
	Tennis
	Track and field^{†}
	Volleyball
† – Track and field includes both indoor and outdoor.

=== Baseball ===
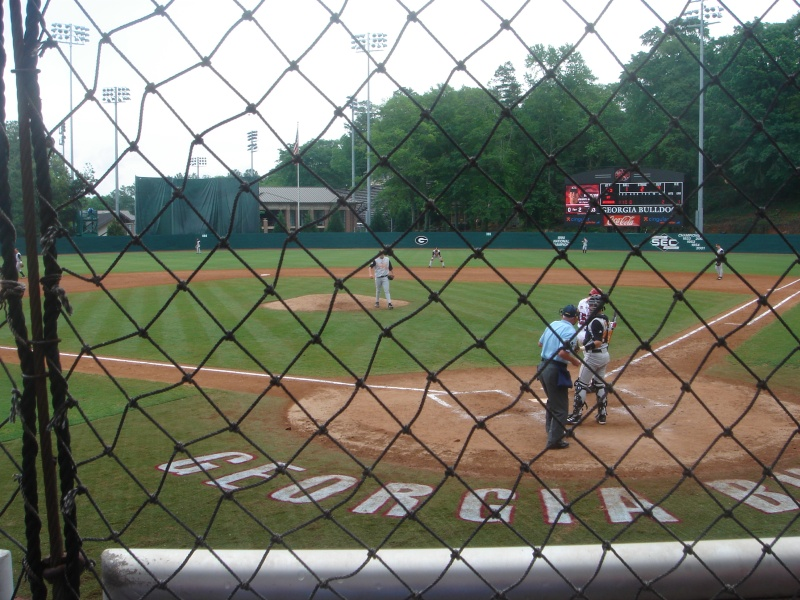
A view of Foley Field from behind the dugout at the University of Georgia

The Bulldogs play in the 3,291-seat Foley Field stadium.

The Georgia Baseball team has seen most of its success in recent years, including winning the 1990 College World Series, as well as making the trip to Omaha in 1987, 1990, 2001, 2004, 2006, 2008, and 2026. The Diamond Dawgs, as they are called, are coached by Wes Johnson.

In its history, the team has claimed six SEC baseball tournament titles, in 1933, 1954, 1955, 2001, 2004, and 2026, and six regular season conference titles, in 1933, 1953, 1954, 2004, 2008, and 2026.

The program dates back to 1886 and, according to former Sports Information Director Dan Magill, was once the most popular sport on campus. However, from the mid-1950s to the late-1980s, and then through most of the 1990s, there were only scattered bright spots as the team managed only a modicum of success.

Since 2001, however, the program has enjoyed a resurgence, winning four championships in the Southeastern Conference, and participating in the College World Series four times in those seven seasons.

The Georgia-Georgia Tech baseball rivalry is one of the South's most fierce. The teams' annual Spring Baseball Classic at Truist Park draws some of the largest crowds in college baseball (the 2004 game was seen by 28,836 spectators, the second-largest crowd in college baseball history).

=== Basketball ===
==== Women's basketball ====
Coach Andy Landers, a pioneer in the sport, coached the Lady Bulldogs from 1979 to 2015, leading them to seven regular-season SEC titles, four SEC tournament championships, twenty 21-win seasons (an average of 24.4 wins per season), 23 NCAA tournaments, and five Final Fours. Landers currently stands as the winningest women's college basketball coach not to have won the national championship. The Lady Dogs' all-time AP ranking stands at 4th as of 2005.

==== Men's basketball ====
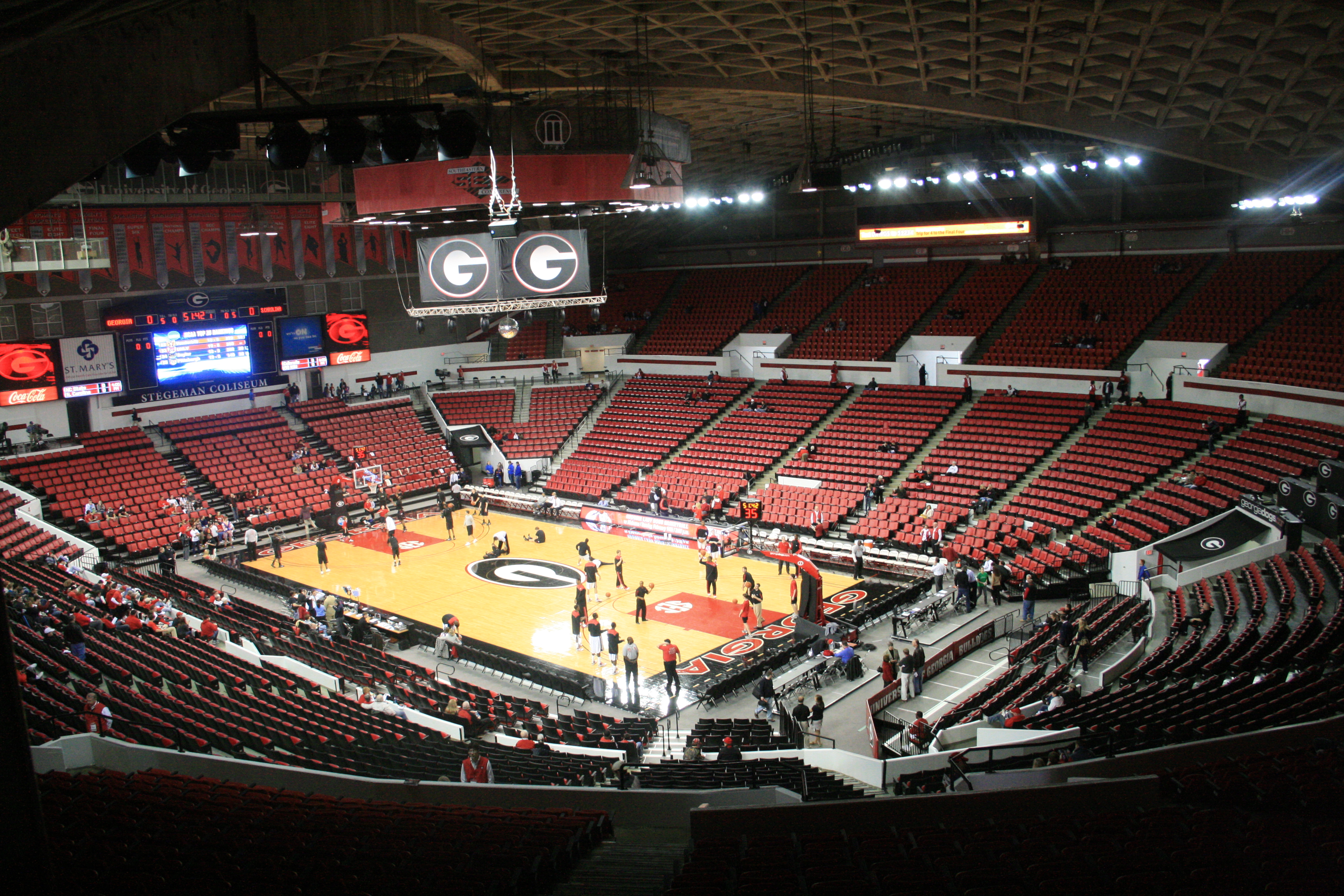
Stegeman Coliseum in Athens, Georgia

Georgia's men's basketball program has enjoyed several impressive seasons, including a run to the 2008 SEC Championship and berth in the NCAA tournament under former head coach Dennis Felton.

While Dominique Wilkins is considered the greatest player in school history, the team's most successful season came one year after his graduation. The Bulldogs made their first NCAA appearance in 1983 – which would have been Wilkins' senior year had he not opted for the NBA. That team advanced to the Final Four before falling to eventual national champion NC State. Under the Tom Crean regime, the Bulldogs landed the number one recruit in the country in Anthony Edwards in 2018, the highest rated recruit in school history. Edwards would go on to be selected first in the 2020 NBA draft by the Minnesota Timberwolves, the first Georgia basketball player to do so.

Since making its first postseason tournament in 1980, Georgia has received 21 postseason invitations under coaches Hugh Durham, Tubby Smith, Ron Jirsa, Jim Harrick, and Dennis Felton, including 10 trips to the NCAA tournament.

=== Equestrian ===
Equestrian was added as UGA's 21st intercollegiate varsity sport in 2001. UGA's newest varsity team first competed in the 2002–2003 season. Head coach Meghan Boenig guided the team to a national championship in the Varsity Equestrian National Championships (NCEA) that year as well as a repeat national championship the following year (2003–2004). After a series of runner-up finishes, the team reclaimed the top spot in 2007–2008 and repeated as champions in 2008–2009 and 2009–2010. They also earned national championship titles in 2014, 2021, and 2025 (its eighth).

The University of Georgia consistently ranks number 1 in the nation for recruits per National Collegiate Equestrian Association's Coaches' poll.

In January 2009, Georgia riders moved into their spacious new home, the UGA Equestrian Complex, located in Bishop, Georgia. The site is approximately 12 miles south of the Athens, Georgia campus. The 109-acre farm was formerly used in the 1996 Summer Olympics as a training site for the U.S. Dressage Team. The team originally trained and held meets at the Animal Science Arena on South Milledge Avenue. The Animal Science Arena is maintained by University of Georgia's College of Agricultural and Environmental Sciences (CAES). As the academic programs grew at CAES, the team relocated to the UGA Equestrian Complex.

=== Football ===
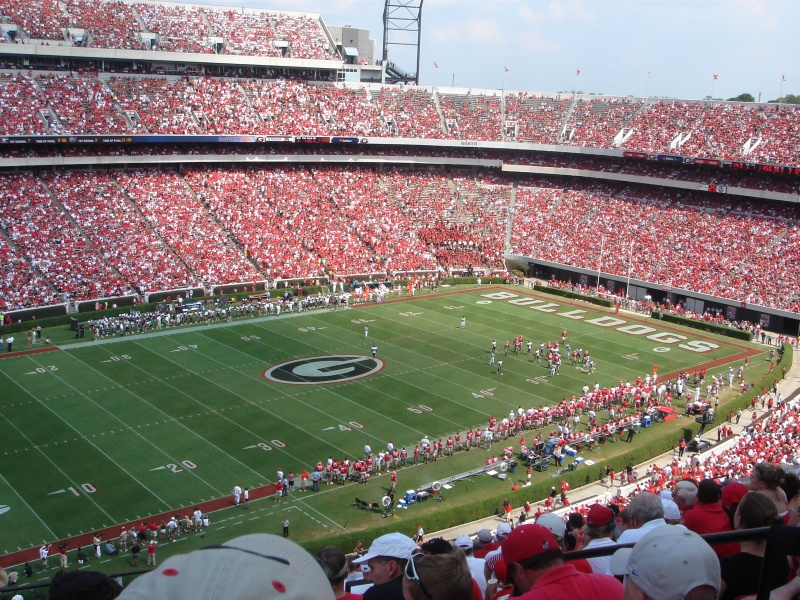
Inside Sanford Stadium during a home game

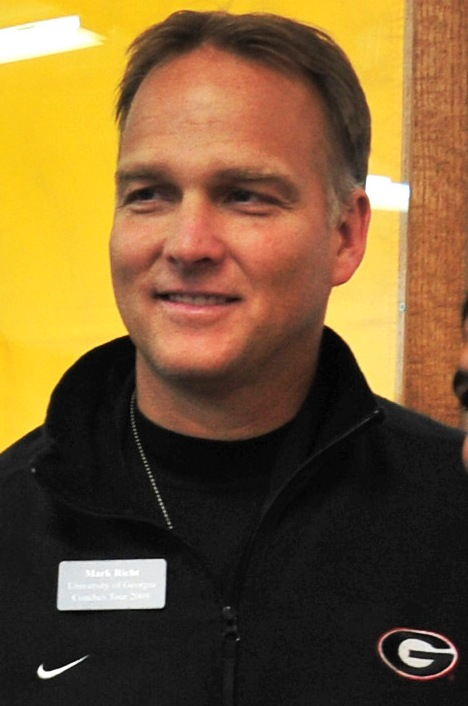
Bulldogs' former head football coach Mark Richt, who coached at Georgia 2001–2015

The 93,033 seat Dooley Field at Sanford Stadium is the home of the Georgia football team. The white, and now also brown Bulldog is UGA's mascot and is properly known as the late "Uga VIII", now "Uga X", previously known as "Que". The Bulldogs play in the tradition-rich Southeastern Conference.

The Bulldogs claim four football national championships: one for the 1942 seasons based on the determinations of several selecting organizations, and three consensus national championships for the 1980, 2021, and 2022 seasons, the 1980 one based on the votes of the AP and Coaches Polls (several selectors have recognized the Bulldogs as national champions for the 1927, 1946, and 1968 seasons as well), and the 2021 and 2022 national champions coming from the 4-Team College Football Playoff. Georgia has won 15 Southeastern Conference (SEC) championships (the most recent coming in 2025).

Georgia owns the nations longest active bowl streak at 29, surpassing the previous leader Virginia Tech, who reeled off 27 in a row. The bulldogs are 20–6 in that stretch, excluding the three CFP National Championship games in 2018, 2022, and 2023. In that time period; Georgia has accumulated 3 Peach Bowl victories, 3 Sugar Bowl victories, 2 Orange Bowl victories, and a CFP Semi-Final Rose Bowl win to send them to the 2018 CFP National Championship game. Georgia's brand has grown exponentially under coach Kirby Smart, who's pieced together three #1 recruiting classes in his eleven seasons as Head Coach and led the Bulldogs to the 2021 National Championship victory over Nick Saban's Alabama Crimson Tide team 33–18. The next year, the Bulldogs also won the National Champion over Sonny Dykes' TCU Horned Frogs team 65–7.

==== Rivalries ====
The Bulldogs' most historic rivalry is with the Auburn Tigers, referred to as the Deep South's Oldest Rivalry and dating back to 1892. The other rivalries are between the Bulldogs and the Atlantic Coast Conference's Georgia Tech Yellow Jackets ("Clean, Old-Fashioned Hate") and the Florida Gators ("World's Largest Outdoor Cocktail Party"). In addition, UGA enjoyed a strong rivalry with the nearby Clemson Tigers for many years in football, especially in the 1980s. The Bulldogs and the Tennessee Volunteers annual showdown on the second Saturday of October has become a rivalry as a result of the 1992 division of the Southeastern Conference into Eastern and Western divisions. Before 1992, the two teams had only met 21 times since 1899. Beginning in 1992, the two teams have played annually as members of the same division. Georgia also enjoys a healthy rivalry with the South Carolina Gamecocks, meeting on the football field 70 times since 1894.

The Georgia-Florida game is held annually in late October/early November in Jacksonville, Florida, a site intended to be neutral. However, the game's location is a point of contention for many Georgia fans; many of whom argue that Jacksonville's location relative to the two universities favors Florida. The city lies 342 miles from Athens, Georgia, home of the Bulldogs, but only 73 miles from Gainesville, Florida, home of the Gators. The game is considered a must-do for many UGA students and alumni. The game was traditionally referred to as the "World's Largest Outdoor Cocktail Party" due to the tailgating and celebration by fans, but in recent years the city and universities have dropped the usage to discourage drunkenness among fans. However, fans and former players on both sides of the rivalry still refer to it by that name, or a shortened "Cocktail Party," choosing not to ever use the sanitized "official" name. Georgia holds the all-time advantage in the series, posting a win–loss record of 56–44–2 (55–44–2 according to the University of Florida, which does not include the 1904 game in Macon, Georgia, played before officially sanctioning its football program). The University of Florida closed what was a substantial gap in the series by posting a better overall record in the 1990s and 2000s. Georgia turned the tables in the 2010s, winning 6 of 10, and Georgia leads the series since 2020, winning the last two games. The most recent game in the rivalry was a 24-20 Bulldogs win.

=== Golf ===
==== Men's golf ====
From 1946 to 1970, Howell Hollis built the Georgia men's golf team into a conference power, claiming 13 SEC titles. George Hamer won the individual national title in 1946. Current coach Chris Haack has led the team to two golf national titles (1999, 2005).

Overall, the men's golf team leads all Georgia sports with 29 conference championships, including seven since 2000 (1941, 1950–52, 1957–59, 1961–65, 1969–72, 1977–78, 1982–83, 1988, 1998, 2000–01, 2004, 2006, 2009–10, 2016).

Notable alumni include two-time Masters' champion Bubba Watson, as well as the winner of the 2019 WGC-Dell Technologies Match Play, Kevin Kisner.

==== Women's golf ====
First organized by Liz Murphey, the Georgia women's golf team is a fixture among the nation's top finishers. In 1981 Terri Moody won the AIAW individual national intercollegiate golf championship on her home course.

Todd McCorkle coached the Georgia women's golf team from 2001 to 2007, when he abruptly resigned before the NCAA Women's Golf Championship under a cloud of sexual harassment allegations. His inaugural UGA team won the national championship. UGA's sixth place tie at the 2006 national event marks the seventh top-10 final ranking in the last nine years. The program has won eleven SEC titles. Former players include Vicki Goetze, now on the LPGA Tour.

=== Women's gymnastics ===
Since 1986, the Gymdogs have brought home 10 gymnastics national championships (1987, '89, 1993, '98, '99, 2005, '06, '07, '08, '09), the most of any team in NCAA history. (while Utah has also won ten national titles, their first was an AIAW Championship in 1981). Georgia is also only the second team (Utah, 1982–86) to win the national title in five consecutive years, winning in 2005–2009. The Gymdogs have won 16 Southeastern Conference titles.

The Gymdogs consistently draw upwards of 10,000 fans to their meets, ranking them second only to football in average attendance among Georgia sports.

No Bulldog team has dominated its sport as much in the past 20 years as the Georgia Gymdogs, under the direction of Suzanne Yoculan. On October 18, 2007, Yoculan announced her retirement after the 2009 season. Longtime assistant Jay Clark succeeded Yoculan as head coach from 2009 to 2012. Danna Durante served as head coach from 2012 to 2017. In 2017 former Gymdog Courtney Kupets-Carter became the head coach and Suzanne Yoculan became a volunteer assistant coach for the transition period.

=== Women's soccer ===
- Turner Soccer Complex

=== Women's swimming and diving ===
UGA Alum and Coach Jack Bauerle has placed the women's program among the nation's elite. As of the 2016 season the women's team is tied with the University of Texas for the second highest number of national championships at seven (1999, 2000, '01, '05, '13, '14, '16) and posted eight national runner-up finishes (2002, '03, '04, '06, '09, '11, '12, '15). The women's swimming and diving team has also won twelve SEC team championships (1997, '98, '99, 2000, '01, '06, '10, '11, '12, '13, '14, '15). Bauerle has coached 11 female Olympians and 88 SEC individual champions. Graduates of the Georgia Swimming and Diving program include three individual recipients of the NCAA Woman of the Year Award: Lisa Coole in 1997, Kristy Kowal in 2000 and Kim Black in 2001.

=== Women's volleyball ===
The volleyball team participates in the Southeastern Conference and is currently coached by Tom Black. They play home games at the Stegeman Coliseum.

=== Softball ===
The Bulldog softball team began play in 1997. The team has won two SEC regular season championships in 2003 and 2005. The Team won the SEC tournament in 2014. The team has made eighteen NCAA tournament appearances. The team has made four Women's College World Series appearances in 2009, 2010, 2016, 2018, and 2021. The current head coach is Lu Harris-Champer.

=== Tennis ===
==== Men's tennis ====
Under the direction of Dan Magill from 1954 to 1988 and his successor (and current head coach) Manuel Diaz, the Georgia Men's Tennis program ranks among the nation's best. The team has won a total of eight tennis national championships in 1985, 1987, 1999, 2001, 2006 (indoor), 2007 (indoor and NCAA Division I), and 2008. The Bulldogs' six NCAA team championships rank fourth all-time. The 2007 indoor championship made Georgia only the sixth team in history to successfully defend the ITA Indoor title. Coach Manuel Diaz is the only NCAA Division I active coach with more than one NCAA team Championships, with four.

The squad has won 32 Southeastern Conference championships, 25 regular season championships and seven SEC tournament championships.

The NCAA Men's Tennis Championship has been held in Athens 24 times in the past 35 years, including consecutively from 1977 to 1989 and in 2007. All but one (2008) of UGA's NCAA team championships have been won in Athens.

==== Women's tennis ====
UGA alumnus Jeff Wallace coached the Georgia Women's Tennis program from 1985 through 2023 and was then the winningest NCAA women's tennis coach with six National Championships (2 NCAA, 4 USTA/ITA Indoor) and an 814-198 record. Former Georgia men's tennis national champion Drake Bernstein became head coach in 2024. He earned SEC Coach of the Year and his team won the NCAA team championship and SEC Championship in his second year coaching. Recently the woman's teams have won three NCAA team championships (1994, 2000, and 2025), five ITA Indoor Championships (1994, 1995, 2002, 2019, and 2025) and ten SEC titles, while individual players have won several individual NCAA titles, and Dasha Vidmanova was named the 2025 SEC Female Athlete of the Year, the first women’s tennis player in SEC history to receive the award. The NCAA Women's Tennis Championship has been held in Athens three times.

=== Track & field and cross country ===
==== Men's track & field ====
Notable UGA men's track and field athletes include Olympic gold medalist Forrest Towns, silver medalist Norman Edwards, and bronze medalists Elija Godwin and Reese Hoffa.

Former UGA coach Petros Kyprianou guided the UGA men's track and field team to the 2018 NCAA men's Division I Outdoor Track and Field Championship title.

==== Men's cross country ====
Notable UGA men's cross country athletes include World Marathon Champion Mark Plaatjes.

==== Women's track & field ====
The UGA women's track and field teams have won three national championships. Caryl Smith-Gilbert coached the Georgia team to the 2025 and 2026 NCAA Division I Women's Outdoor Track and Field Championship and the 2025 NCAA Division I Women's Indoor Track and Field Championship. The 2025 championships included Stephanie Ratcliffe who won the hammer throw as her second title after transferring from Harvard and became the first NCAA competitor to accomplish the feat at two different schools and in the non-consecutive years of 2023 and 2025. Coach Smith–Gilbert thereafter led the team to the 2026 NCAA Women's Division I Indoor Track and Field Championship and she was honored as the 2026 National Women's Coach of the Year by the U.S. Track & Field and Cross Country Coaches Association. Then UGA coach Petros Kyprianou guided the UGA women's track and field team to the 2018 NCAA Women's Division I Indoor Track and Field Championship.

Notable recent UGA women's track and field athletes include Olympic gold medalists Gwen Torrence, Debbie Ferguson-McKenzie, Shaunae Miller-Uibo, Lynna Irby, and Aaliyah Butler, silver medalist Hyleas Fountain, and bronze medalist Debbie Ferguson.

=== Other sports ===
Other notable sports teams include the perennial power men's swimming team.

== Club sports ==
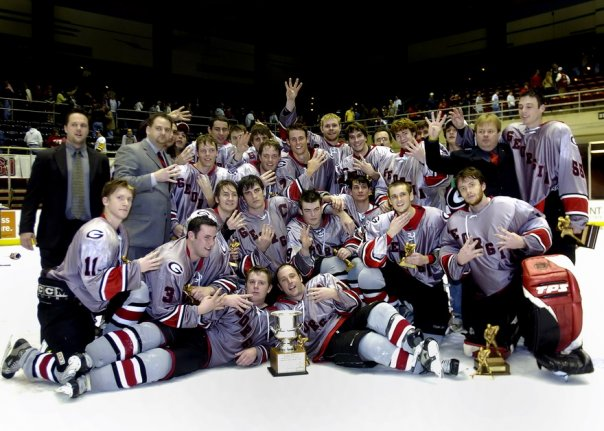
University of Georgia ice hockey

The University of Georgia offers more than 40 club sports, administered by the university's Department of Recreational Sports, a unit of the UGA Division of Student Affairs. Club sports allow students to compete at a high intercollegiate level without varsity or NCAA status; clubs are student-initiated and student-led, operating in conjunction with the Competitive Sports program within Recreational Sports. According to Recreational Sports' fiscal year 2025 annual report, the program drew nearly 3,000 participants across 57 club events that year.

Active clubs include archery, badminton, baseball, budokai, cheerleading, cross country and track, equestrian, eventing, fencing, field hockey, flag football, golf, gymnastics, men's and women's ice hockey, karate, men's and women's lacrosse, pickleball, rowing, men's and women's rugby, sailing, men's and women's soccer, softball, spikeball, swimming, tennis, men's and women's ultimate frisbee, men's and women's volleyball, water polo, whitewater, and wrestling. Teams frequently play intercollegiate rivals and compete in club-sport conferences and national governing bodies such as the American Collegiate Hockey Association, the Men's Collegiate Lacrosse Association, and USA Ultimate. The club water polo team has won the Collegiate Water Polo Association's Southeast Division title three times (2010, 2013, and 2015).

Most club teams practice and compete at the university's facilities at the Ramsey Student Center and the adjacent Club Sports Complex, a lighted, 180,000-square-foot facility on South Milledge Avenue featuring natural and synthetic turf fields.

=== Ice hockey ===
The University of Georgia Ice Dawgs, founded in 1987, are the university's ice hockey club and one of its oldest continuously operating club sports. The team competes in the American Collegiate Hockey Association (ACHA) Division I and has historically played in the South Eastern Collegiate Hockey Conference (SECHC), later succeeded by the College Hockey South conference. The Ice Dawgs have won three SECHC championships (2015–16, 2016–17, and 2018–19) and a College Hockey South championship in 2022.

Since 2014 the team has played its home games in downtown Athens at Akins Ford Arena, part of The Classic Center complex; the team moved into the venue's newly rebuilt 5,500-seat hockey configuration when it reopened in December 2024. The arrangement, which has at times included sold-out crowds, is credited with giving the program a fan following unusual for a club-level team and helping drive plans for the venue's permanent expansion. Beginning with the 2025–26 season, the Ice Dawgs also began competing in an ACHA conference branded as the "SEC."

The Ice Dawgs have also been longtime participants in the Savannah Hockey Classic, an annual tournament held in Savannah, Georgia, since 1999 that has also featured Florida, Florida State, and Georgia Tech; Georgia has won the tournament's Thrasher Cup ten times since the event's inception. At a 2020 Thrasher Cup matchup against Georgia Tech in Savannah, a Georgia player estimated the crowd at around 5,000, the majority of them Georgia fans. A home game against Florida the same season drew a reported sellout of 2,197 at the Classic Center's prior arena configuration.

=== Ultimate frisbee ===
The men's ultimate frisbee club, known as Jojah, competes in USA Ultimate's College Division I and has been a recurring qualifier for the USAU College Series national championships. Jojah reached the 2021 national final as the No. 11 seed, finishing as national runner-up to North Carolina. Georgia's Hayden Austin-Knab was named Ultiworld's 2021 D-I Men's College Player of the Year for his performance that season. The university's women's ultimate club, known as Athena, has also made multiple USAU Nationals appearances. Both clubs co-host the annual Classic City Classic tournament in Athens.

=== Lacrosse ===
The men's lacrosse club competes in the Men's Collegiate Lacrosse Association (MCLA) as a member of the SouthEastern Lacrosse Conference (SELC), where it maintains a regional rivalry with Georgia Tech; the two programs have repeatedly met with conference seeding and tournament implications at stake. Georgia has also built a recurring series against Auburn within SELC Division I play. A women's club lacrosse team also competes outside the varsity/NCAA structure.

The program marked its 50th anniversary in 2025, a milestone noted during a SELC matchup against Georgia Tech. The team reached the quarterfinal round of the MCLA national tournament in 2023 before a down 2024 season prompted a rebuilding effort.

=== Rugby ===
Founded in 1967, the University of Georgia Rugby Football Club is the university's oldest club sport and plays Division I college rugby in the Southeastern Collegiate Rugby Conference against traditional SEC rivals. Georgia finished the 2012 regular season with a 4–2 conference record, narrowly missing the conference playoffs. In 2024, the club was ranked as high as No. 20 nationally and made its debut at the National Collegiate Rugby National 7s tournament in Washington, D.C., finishing seventh after a 2–2 showing. The Red & Black has credited the program with producing collegiate All-American players and coaches who have gone on to careers elsewhere in American rugby. A women's rugby club also competes as part of the program.

=== Baseball ===
The club baseball team competes in the National Club Baseball Association (NCBA). In 2012, Georgia entered the NCBA Division I World Series, held at Golden Park in Columbus, Georgia, as the tournament's No. 1 overall seed. The Bulldogs won their first two games of the tournament before being eliminated in bracket play; eventual champion Utah State went on to win the title.

== Championships ==
=== NCAA and other collegiate team championships ===
Georgia has won 55 total national championships and 35 team NCAA championships at the Division I level.

- Men's (10)
  - Baseball (1): 1990
  - Golf (2): 1999, 2005
  - Tennis (6): 1985, 1987, 1999, 2001, 2007, 2008
  - Outdoor Track & Field (1): 2018
- Women's (25)
  - Golf (1): 2001
  - Gymnastics (10): 1987, 1989, 1993, 1998, 1999, 2005, 2006, 2007, 2008, 2009
  - Swimming (7): 1999, 2000, 2001, 2005, 2013, 2014, 2016
  - Tennis (3): 1994, 2000, 2025
  - Indoor Track & Field (2): 2018, 2026
  - Outdoor Track & Field (2): 2025, 2026

Below are 20 national team titles in varsity sports that were not bestowed by the NCAA.

- Men's (6)
  - Football (4): 1942, 1980, 2021, 2022
  - Indoor Tennis (2): 2006, 2007 (ITA)
- Women's (14)
  - Indoor Tennis (6): 1994, 1995, 2002, 2019, 2025, 2026 (ITA)
  - Equestrian (8): 2003, 2004, 2008, 2009, 2010, 2014, 2021, 2025

Note: Georgia's website has multiple pages which list national championships by sport; before the 2021 football title victory, it only called out one season for football (1980). Pre-2022 Georgia football media guides contain a year-by-year results section in which five seasons (1980) have "National Champions#" headers paired with selector callouts, but also a "Championship History" page which pairs 1942 and 1980 into a "The Consensus National Champions" section and groups 1927, 1946, and 1968 together as national champions without description, beyond identification of those specific selectors.

=== SEC Team Championships ===
Georgia has won 186 SEC team championships.

- Men's (103)
  - Football (16): 1942, 1946, 1948, 1959, 1966, 1968, 1976, 1980, 1981, 1982, 2002, 2005, 2017, 2022, 2024, 2025
  - Baseball (9): 1933, 1953, 1954, 1987, 2001, 2004°, 2008, 2026, 2026t
  - Basketball (3): 1983t, 1990, 2008t
  - Golf (29): 1941, 1950, 1951, 1952, 1957, 1958, 1959, 1961, 1962, 1963, 1964, 1965, 1969, 1970, 1971, 1972, 1977, 1978, 1982, 1983, 1988, 1998, 2000, 2001, 2004, 2006, 2009, 2010, 2016
  - Tennis (42): 1971, 1972, 1973, 1974, 1975, 1977, 1978, 1979, 1981, 1982, 1985, 1987, 1988, 1989, 1991, 1991t, 1993, 1993t, 1995, 1995t, 1996, 1997, 1999°, 2001, 2001t, 2002, 2004t, 2006, 2006t, 2007, 2007t, 2008, 2011°, 2012t, 2013, 2013t, 2014, 2015, 2016, 2017°, 2017t, 2023
  - Outdoor Track & Field (1): 1937
  - Swimming (3): 1951, 1952, 1955
- Women's (83)
  - Basketball (9): 1983, 1984°, 1984t, 1986, 1991, 1996, 1997, 2000°, 2001t
  - Equestrian (3): 2015, 2017, 2018
  - Golf (11): 1983, 1985, 1988, 1990, 1993, 1994, 1997, 1998, 1999, 2001, 2007
  - Gymnastics (16): 1986, 1987, 1991, 1992, 1993, 1994, 1996, 1997, 1998, 1999, 2001, 2002, 2004, 2005, 2006, 2008**Soccer (1) : 2023t
  - Softball (3): 2003, 2005, 2014t
  - Swimming (12): 1997, 1998, 1999, 2000, 2001, 2006, 2010, 2011, 2012, 2013, 2014, 2015
  - Tennis (22): 1983t, 1989t, 1990°, 1994, 1994t, 2000, 2001t, 2002, 2007, 2007t, 2008t, 2009, 2009t, 2013°, 2014t, 2019, 2021, 2021t, 2023t, 2024°, 2024t, 2025t
  - Indoor Track & Field (1): 2006
  - Outdoor Track & Field (3): 1995, 2006, 2025
  - Volleyball (3): 1985, 1985t, 1986

° = co-champions, t = tournament

== Athletic directors ==
The athletic department suffered through several controversies in the early 2000s, including a major scandal within the men's basketball program. In 2003, a power struggle between University President Michael Adams and athletic director and Bulldog legend Vince Dooley stole headlines when Adams refused to renew Dooley's contract, effectively firing him. The battle became one painted as academics versus athletics, though this idea was rejected when the university's Franklin College of Arts and Sciences faculty issued a vote of "no confidence" on Adams' leadership in 2004.

The firestorm has calmed slightly since then, however, largely due to the success of Dooley's successor, Damon Evans. In 2006, the Bulldogs recorded the highest profit margin of any athletic program in the country (according to the EADA report), pulling in $23.9 million, and also recorded another highly successful year on the field. However, Evans was arrested for DUI on June 30, 2010; his passenger, a 28-year-old woman, was arrested for disorderly conduct who told police that she had been seeing Evans for about one week. Evans has been asked for his resignation effective on Monday, July 5, 2010, and he has agreed to resign.

Damon Evans was replaced by Greg McGarity, a Georgia alum and Associate AD at the University of Florida, in 2010. McGarity's tenure as Georgia's AD was one that saw a great surge in fundraising prowess. In 2015, McGarity made the controversial decision to fire long time Head Coach, Mark Richt. He then hired Alabama Defensive Coordinator Kirby Smart as Richt's replacement. Smart went on to win back-to-back College football National Championships.

Greg McGarity retired at the end of 2020 and was replaced in the summer of 2021 by Josh Brooks, who is the athletic director of record for the Bulldogs' 2022 College Football Playoff National Championship win. McGarity brought Brooks back to UGA from Louisiana-Monroe to essentially make him the Athletic Director in waiting.

== Notable alumni ==
The Georgia Bulldogs football team boasts two Heisman Trophy winners (Frank Sinkwich, 1942, and Herschel Walker, 1982), and holds the distinction of having three graduates become Super Bowl MVPs (Jake Scott, 1972, Terrell Davis, 1998, and Hines Ward, 2005). Additional notable former players include WR Lindsay Scott, QB Eric Zeier, QB Fran Tarkenton, RB Charley Trippi, RB Rodney Hampton, FB Mack Strong, RB Garrison Hearst, DE Bill Stanfill, DB Terry Hoage, CB Champ Bailey, RB Olandis Gary, DE Richard Seymour, LB Boss Bailey, DE/LB David Pollack, QB David Greene, K Kevin Butler, CB Sean Jones, SS/LB Thomas Davis, WR Reggie Brown, FS Greg Blue, QB Buck Belue, RB Knowshon Moreno, QB Matthew Stafford, WR Mohamed Massaquoi, QB Evan Boose, PR Prince Miller, R Rennie Curran, LT Jon Stinchcomb, WR A. J. Green, RB Todd Gurley, RB Nick Chubb, RB Sony Michel, LB Richard Tardits, QB Stetson Bennett, DT Jordan Davis. TE Brock Bowers, and WR Ladd McConkey.

Despite being overshadowed by its football program, the Georgia Bulldogs basketball team has produced several notable players that went on to be successful in the NBA. In 2020, Georgia freshman Anthony Edwards was selected first overall in the 2020 NBA draft, becoming the first Bulldog to do so. The Bulldogs boast three U.S. Olympians (Vern Fleming, Willie Anderson, Anthony Edwards), with Fleming and Edwards eventually each earning gold medal. Other notable alumni include Dominique Wilkins, 9-time NBA All-Star whose number 21 was retired by the Atlanta Hawks, as well as Shandon Anderson, Jarvis Hayes, Kentavious Caldwell-Pope, Nic Claxton, and Toumani Camara. In total, 24 Bulldogs have progressed to playing in the NBA.

The Lady Dogs basketball team has produced two U.S. Olympians who have combined to earn six Gold Medals (Teresa Edwards and Katrina McClain Johnson), 16 former players who have continued to the WNBA (second-most nationally), and six WNBA first-round draft picks in the past five years (second-most nationally). There were eight Lady Bulldogs on WNBA rosters in 2006: Kara Braxton, Detroit Shock; Kedra Holland-Corn, Detroit Shock; Deanna Nolan, Detroit Shock; Kelly Miller, Phoenix Mercury; Coco Miller, Washington Mystics; Christi Thomas, Los Angeles Sparks; Sherill Baker, New York Liberty; and Kiesha Brown, New York Liberty.

The Bulldogs baseball team has seen several of its former players move on to successful professional careers, most notably former New York Yankees pitcher Spud Chandler. Also, St. Louis Cardinals pitcher Cris Carpenter (not to be confused with current Cardinals pitcher Chris Carpenter), pitcher Derek Lilliquist, Chicago White Sox batter Gordon Beckham, Seattle Mariners pitcher Dave Fleming, and Georgia high school football coaching legend Billy Henderson played for the Bulldogs.

== Broadcasters ==
Bulldogs football and basketball games air locally on WRFC and WNGC in Athens, and on WSB and WSBB-FM in Atlanta. Scott Howard serves as radio announcer for both sports. Eric Zeier and Chuck Dowdle are the football and basketball color analysts respectively. Known for his gravelly voice, Larry Munson provided radio play-by-play for the Georgia Bulldogs football games from 1966 to 2008. He also handled the play-by-play for UGA basketball and Atlanta Falcons radio broadcasts and hosted sports-related talk shows.
