= Greg McGarity =

American college sports administrator (born 1954)

Biographical details
- Born: October 1, 1954 (age 71); Athens, Georgia, U.S.

Playing career
- 1973: Georgia

Coaching career (HC unless noted)

Women's tennis
- 1977–1981: Georgia

Administrative career (AD unless noted)
- 1973–1977: Georgia (SA)
- 1977–1981: Georgia (asst. SID)
- 1982–1988: Georgia (admin asst.)
- 1988–1992: Georgia (assistant AD)
- 1992–2010: Florida (associate AD)
- 2010–2020: Georgia

Head coaching record
- Overall: 141–100–18 (football)

Greg McGarity (born October 1, 1954) is the former athletic director for the University of Georgia.

== Early years and education ==
McGarity began his association with University of Georgia athletics at the age of 10, when he worked as a helper for tennis coach Dan Magill. Later, after enrolling at the University, McGarity was a letterman on the 1973 Bulldog tennis team, and after graduation officially began his professional career at UGA. After serving as a student assistant from 1973–77, he held positions as assistant sports information director and head women’s tennis coach (1977–81), administrative assistant (1982–88), and assistant athletic director for facilities and event management (1988–92).

== Director - University of Georgia Athletics ==
McGarity started as the university's athletic director on September 1, 2010 after Damon Evans' resignation due to his DUI. Prior to his tenure at the University of Georgia, McGarity was the Executive Senior Associate Athletics Director for the University of Florida.

McGarity worked at Georgia until 1992, when he left for Florida. In June 2012, McGarity signed a contract to stay in his position until December.

In November 2015, McGarity made the controversial decision to fire Mark Richt as Head Coach of the football team, despite Richt possessing the third highest winning percentage in program history and leading a team that would ultimately finish with its second straight ten win season. McGarity hired as his replacement Kirby Smart, a Georgia alumnus with no previous head coaching experience.

In February 2019, it was announced that McGarity's contract at the University had been extended by one year.

On November 30, 2020, McGarity announced his plans to retire after ten years as athletic director effective December 31, 2020.

== Gator Bowl Sports ==
On January 5, 2021, Gator Bowl Sports announced that McGarity, effective March 1, 2021, would become the organization's new president and CEO.

== Personal life ==
McGarity is married to the former Sheryl Holland, who graduated from UGA in 1976 with a Bachelor of Science degree in education. They have one son, Alex, a graduate of the University of Florida and the University of Georgia, and an events manager for Gator Bowl Sports.
