= Coast (disambiguation) =

The coast is where the land meets the sea or ocean.

Coast, Coastal, or Coastline may also refer to:

== Places ==
- Coast (PAT station), a station on the Port Authority of Allegheny County's light rail network
- Coast at Lakeshore East, a Chicago residential skyscraper
- Coast Province, a province in Kenya
- Coast Region, a region in Tanzania
- The Coast, Newark, New Jersey, a neighborhood in Newark, New Jersey

== Arts, entertainment, and media ==
=== Music ===
==== Groups and labels ====
- Coast (folk rock band), an English folk rock band on Awen Records, 2007
- Coast (Scottish band) 1991-1996
- Coasts (band), an indie-pop quintet from Bristol, England
- The Coast (band), a Canadian band on Aporia Records

==== Albums ====
- Coastal (Godstar album)
- Coastal (The Field Mice album)

==== Songs ====
- "Coast" (song), a 2022 song by Hailee Steinfeld featuring Anderson Paak

=== Periodicals ===
- Coast (magazine), a consumer magazine about the British seaside
- Coastal Leader, a newspaper in Kingston, South Australia

=== Mass media ===
- Coast (radio station), a New Zealand radio station, started in 2004
- Coastal Television Network, a defunct Tanzanian television channel

=== Other uses in arts, entertainment, and media ===
- Coast (TV series), a BBC TV documentary series
- Coastline (sculpture), a 1993 outdoor sculpture by American artist Jim Sanborn
- Coast (film), a 2022 film featuring Melissa Leo
- Coastlines (film), a 2002 dramatic film
- Coastal (film), a 2025 documentary film

== Brands and enterprises ==
- Coast (clothing), British women's clothing retail chain
- Coast (soap), a brand of bar soap and body wash, currently manufactured by High Ridge Brands

== Schools ==
- COAST Laboratory (Computer Operations, Audit, and Security Technology), of Purdue University
- Coastal Carolina University in South Carolina, or its athletic program, the Coastal Carolina Chanticleers

== Science and technology ==
- Coast (web browser), a web browser developed by Opera Software
- Cache on a stick (COAST), computer memory
- Cambridge Optical Aperture Synthesis Telescope, an astronomical optical interferometer
- Coastal class airship, a class of British World War I airships

== Other uses ==
- Coastal (horse) (1976–2005), American Thoroughbred racehorse
- Coastal Corporation, an American oil company
- Coasting or gliding, a technique of driving a manual transmission car
- Cooperative Alliance for Seacoast Transportation (COAST), a public bus system in the coastal region of New Hampshire, United States
- Team Coast, a German professional cycling team year 2000

== See also ==
- The Coast (disambiguation)
- Coast to Coast (disambiguation)
- Coaster (disambiguation)
- Coastie (disambiguation)
- Coasting (disambiguation)
- East Coast (disambiguation)
- North Coast (disambiguation)
- South Coast (disambiguation)
- West Coast (disambiguation)
