= Coaster =

Coaster or Coasters may refer to:

== Arts and entertainment ==
- The Coasters, an American doo-wop band
- Coaster (album), by punk rock band NOFX
- Coaster, a 2000 album by The Bobs
- Coaster (video game), a 1993 roller coaster simulator
- Coaster Step, a dance step
- Roller coaster, a form of fun ride, often shortened to coaster
- Coaster, the dragon mascot of the Playland (New York) theme park

== Transport ==
- Coaster (rail service), a commuter rail service in San Diego County, California, U.S.
- Coaster (Southern Pacific Railroad train), a former rail service in California, US
- Toyota Coaster, a minibus model
- Coaster brake, a type of bicycle brake
- Coastal trading vessel, also known as a coaster, a ship used for trade along a coastline

== Other uses ==
- Drink coaster, on which to rest a cup
- Pot coaster, or trivet
- The Coaster, a weekly newspaper in Asbury Park, New Jersey, U.S.
- Coaster trout (Salvelinus fontinalis), a fish native to Northern America's Lake Superior
- Coaster, a demonym for people from New Zealand's West Coast

== See also ==
- Coast (disambiguation)
- Coastie (disambiguation)
- West Coaster (disambiguation)
