= The Coast =

The Coast may refer to:

== Radio stations ==
- The Coast 89.7, the branding of CKOA-FM, a radio station in Cape Breton, Nova Scotia, Canada
- The Coast (radio station), a regional radio station based in Southampton, England, UK
- KOST-FM
- WMNX-FM
- WFLC-HD2

== Music ==
- "The Coast", a song by Paul Simon from his 1990 album The Rhythm of the Saints
- "The Coast", a 2010 song by Court Yard Hounds
- The Coast (band), an indie rock band from Toronto, Ontario, Canada
  - The Coast (EP), the 2006 self-titled debut EP by The Coast

== Other uses ==
- The Coast (newspaper), a weekly newspaper in Halifax, Canada
- The Coast, Newark, New Jersey, USA; a neighborhood

== See also ==
- Coast (disambiguation)
