= Majestic Theatre (Madison) =

Music venue in Madison, Wisconsin, United States

- Club Majestic
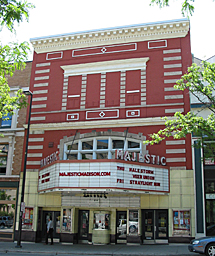
- Majestic Theatre, 2009

- Location within Wisconsin
- Address: 115 King Street; Madison, Wisconsin; United States
- Coordinates: 43.074378°N 89.3809178°W
- Capacity: 600
- Designation: Historic landmark
- Current use: Live concert venue

Construction
- Opened: December 15, 1906
- Years active: 106
- Architects: Claude & Starck

Website
- majesticmadison.com

The Majestic Theatre is a 600-capacity live music venue in downtown Madison, Wisconsin. Opened in 1906, it is Madison's oldest theater, changing ownership many times and adapting to the many changes in the entertainment business throughout its history. Beginning as a vaudeville theater, it became a movie house by 1912 with occasional live acts, and converted to talking motion pictures by 1930. Today the theater is owned and operated by Matt Gerding and Scott Leslie who acquired the theater in 2007 and made it into a successful music club hosting DJs and live shows several nights a week.

== History ==
=== Vaudeville theater (1906–1912) ===
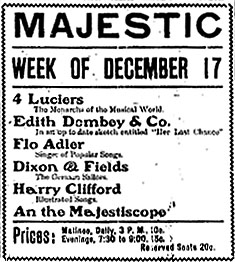
A newspaper ad promoting the Majestic's vaudeville acts during its opening week in 1906.

The Majestic Theatre was founded by Edward F. Biederstaedt (1865–1912) and his brother Otto, sons of Williamson Street grocer Charles Biederstaedt, whose German ancestors helped establish the Catholic church in Madison. Edward had been a railroad brakeman, secondhand goods dealer, and later ran the White House saloon on King Street. By 1900, he was running a gambling house in the basement of the Capital Hotel. Otto was a printer at the Democrat Printing Company. On May 6, 1906 the Biederstaedts purchased the King Street property from developers of the Cantwell block at Pinckney and Doty Streets, previously the site of annual outdoor tent shows featuring horses and touring vaudeville acts.

Designed by Madison architects Claude & Starck, the Majestic has an irregular footprint due to it being in the center of a triangle-shaped block. It became the second vaudeville house in Madison when it opened on Saturday, December 15, 1906. Attendees were met with gray uniformed ushers and free music provided by Charles Nitschke Jr.'s Arion Orchestra. Appearing in the theater's first week were the 4 Luciers ("Monarchs of the Musical World"), popular singer Flo Adler, an "up-to-date sketch" by Edith Dembey & Company, comedians Dixon & Fields as German sailors, and the "Majestiscope"—lyrics to popular songs projected on a screen for the audience to sing along with. Admission was fifteen cents, with reserved seats being twenty cents and matinees a dime.

Promoting itself as Madison's family vaudeville house, the Majestic was immediately popular. Only months after opening contractor John H. Findorff was hired to add a balcony and theater boxes, raising capacity to nearly 500, plus a second ticket window to accommodate the many patrons. Performers were hired through the United Booking Agency and Klaw and Erlanger, and later the Western Vaudeville Managers' Association. Before celebrating their first year the Biederstadt brothers were already seeking to acquire theaters in La Crosse, Winona and Minneapolis, as well as making an offer on Madison's Fuller Opera House. The Biederstaedts took on a partner and incorporated with $50,000 capital as the Majestic Amusement Company. They rented out the Majestic as meeting space, hosting a convention of Wisconsin fire chiefs in 1909. They also began showing their first "moving pictures" in 1908. Three years later, the Biederstaedts' fortunes had changed. Edward's "nervous" wife shot herself in the head on the eve of the opening of a competing vaudeville theater, the New Orpheum. He himself would die four months later.

The types of performances staged were typical of the vaudeville era, including all manner of singers, dancers and musicians, ethnic comedians, magicians, minstrel shows, hypnotists, Asian acrobats and live animal acts ranging from dogs to seals to lions. Claims have been made over the years that vaudevillians such as Harry Houdini, Al Jolson, W. C. Fields and the Marx Brothers performed on the Majestic stage, but there is no evidence of these shows in newspapers during the six years the theater featured live vaudeville, although their appearances have been confirmed at other Madison theaters.

=== Sherwood and McWilliams' Majestic (1912–1916) ===
In July 1912, Jay Sherwood and F. J. McWilliams, operators of Madison's Grand and Fair Play theaters, gained control of the Majestic, renovating and re-opening it as a movie house on September 14. Showing first-run releases from the Universal Film Company, the theater was operated by a succession of managers including William M. Fursman, Hugh Flannery, Archie M. Cox, and George B. Thompson. In 1915, Wisconsin doctors were criticized for hiring a scantily clad dancer from the Majestic as entertainment for their convention.

=== Fischer's Majestic (1916–1920s) ===
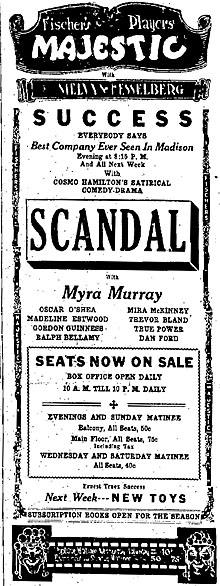
A 1924 newspaper ad promoting the Majestic Players featuring Melvyn Hesselberg (Melvyn Douglas) and Ralph Bellamy.

In 1916, owner R. M. Power sold the Majestic to Frank W. Fischer of Chicago. Facing competition from Madison's newer movie houses, Fischer renovated the theater by switching from coal to oil heating, installing a new ventilation system and moving the projectionist booth to the top of the balcony. He also added new lighting effects and an electric Bartolo organ for $7,000, later replacing it a year later with a much larger model for a reported $46,000. He also employed "mulatto girls in neat costumes" as ushers. He remodeled the theater yet again in 1923. On April 29, 1916 Fischer pioneered Madison's first kiddie matinees.

Incorporating as Fischer Paramount Theaters, he left operation of the Majestic to various managers (such as T. H. Luneman, Louis St. Pierre, Richard Siebert, Walter Nealand, and Tom Norman) while building a circuit of show palaces, including Madison's Parkway and Madison theaters in addition to ten other houses in Wisconsin and Illinois.

In April 1921, Fischer was applauded for presenting the Cosmopolitan picture The Inside of the Cup after it was lambasted in a Chicago Tribune editorial and had been refused as "undesirable" by A. P. Desormeaux, manager of Madison's Strand Theater. The film was criticized for portraying business men and the clergy preying upon the poor. Fischer was praised after screening the film for a select group of state lawmakers and society women. In 1924, a Madison policewoman sought to halt the Majestic from presenting Bell's Hawaiian Revue, declaring the act "detrimental to public morals" due to the brevity of the hula costumes. The police chief declined to issue an injunction, while the theater was filled with capacity crowds.

In 1924, the Majestic staged several months of successful comic plays performed by the Majestic Players, a stock company of local actors that included future Hollywood film stars Ralph Bellamy, Edmond O'Brien and Melvyn Hesselberg, who later changed his name to Melvyn Douglas.

In 1927, the Majestic dropped its weekday shows, restoring them with added amateur nights the next year. In the late 1920s the theater building was bought by S. M. Kernan, a commercial fisherman who held the city contract to clear the lakes of carp. The Majestic was managed by Edmund H. Michalson, who with his father Torger S. Michalson owned the Orton and Palace Theaters on Madison's east side. After the advent of talkies, Edmund defended the continued showing of silent films by pointing out that many people are hard of hearing.

Following the stock market crash of 1929, F. J. McWilliams was appointed trustee for the creditors of the Fischer theaters in Madison and oversaw the dissolution of the chain.

In April 1930, Michalson was threatened with revocation of the theater's license by Mayor Albert G. Schmedeman for showing a movie without first getting approval from Madison's film censorship committee. The feature in question was No More Children, a film that advocated birth control. Michalson's attorney (and future Wisconsin congressman) Harry Sauthoff criticized the body for lax supervision and for allowing "hotter" films be shown in other theaters. After screening No More Children for the committee, Michalson was given a letter of reprimand.

=== Desormeaux's Majestic (1930–1943) ===
In November 1930, S.M. Kernan leased the theater for $100,000 with an option to buy to Arthur P. Desormeaux, who had become the manager of the Eastwood Theater on Madison's east side. Originally a film distributor, Desormeaux had been the manager of the Strand Theater since 1918. He closed the Majestic for many weeks while he had the interior remodeled and outfitted for talking pictures. He planned on renaming the house the State Theater, but later dismissed the idea. That same year Desormeaux was placed on the "unfair" list by Local 251 of I.A.T.S.E. due to his refusal to employ union labor at the Majestic and for refusing to bargain with union members at the Eastwood. Desormeaux also acquired other theaters in Mineral Point and Mount Horeb, but they did not prove lucrative.

Following the downtown openings of the New Orpheum and Capitol theaters, the Majestic succeeded as a second-run theater, known for its kiddie matinees of Wild West "shoot 'em ups" and adventure serials. In the early 1930s the theater lost its contract as a second-run house to the Strand, forcing Desormeaux to boost his advertising to compete with the newer houses. During a hearing concerning the oversale of bonds invested in the Orpheum, Strand and Parkway theaters, Desormeaux proposed to manage those houses plus the Majestic to pay off the bondholders, but nothing came of his plan.

As World War II began, Desormeaux strengthened the Majestic's ties to the community through charitable actions such as offering free passes to old age pensioners and donating a day's box office receipts to the USO. In 1942, he helped manage the local collection of scrap metal for the war effort, contributing several steam radiators from the theater. He also opened the theater early mornings to accommodate third-shift defense workers.

Citing declining health, Desormeaux and his wife sold the Majestic in 1943 to Warner Brothers Theaters of Wisconsin, Inc. Conditions of the sale stipulated that the theater could not be closed for more than thirty days at a time, and included a ban on burlesque or obscene shows. Nevertheless, the theater held Madison's first pin-up girl photo contest a year later.

=== Warner theater (1943–1976) ===
As a Warner house the Majestic was run by a variety of managers including Wayne Berkely, Roland Krause, R. O. Jensen, Robert Tauscher, James McCarthy, Ollie G. Thompson, Dennis Finkler and Marian Aasen.

The Majestic was about one third the capacity of the other Warner theater in Madison, the Capitol, and typically screened the Warner studio's lesser films or finished out the runs that opened at the larger theater. After the 1948 Supreme Court anti-trust ruling United States v. Paramount Pictures, Inc. that declared that studios must separate their film production from their exhibition, Warner Brothers sold its theater holdings to Stanley Warner Theatres (later RKO-Stanley-Warner Theaters). In 1956, the theater was once again extensively renovated, and re-opened with the movie musical High Society. The Majestic boasted "ultra modern decorative effects" with new seats, screen, refreshment stand and improved projection.

As the 1960s loomed, the Majestic began to establish itself as the place to see art house and foreign films, with mainstream fare rounding out their bookings. After police heard complaints about a movie trailer that showed "objectionable" material, the Majestic previewed Ingmar Bergman's The Silence for a group headed by the Madison chief of police, but they declined to censor the film. In 1965, the Majestic finished a 14-week run of My Fair Lady, the longest run for any film in a Madison theater at that time. But as social mores and attitudes began to change during the late 1960s, RKO-Stanley-Warner began booking soft-core "skin flicks" that were light on art and heavy on nudity. When criticized for doing so, manager Finkler replied that the local audience for family movies had dried up.

=== Landmark theater (1976–1992) ===
In November 1976, real estate broker Dan Nevasier bought the Majestic from RKO-Stanley Warner Theaters of New York for $125,000, adding it to his chain of 20th Century Theaters in Madison. He then leased the house to Parallax (later Landmark) Theatres of Los Angeles, a national chain of repertory cinemas that was founded by several former University of Wisconsin students. Parallax specialized in presenting classic, independent, foreign and cult films by screening a different double feature nearly every night. Drawing from the popularity of the campus film societies, the Majestic promoted its diverse schedule on free poster calendars. On June 3, 1978 it began its first midnight showings of The Rocky Horror Picture Show, which ran there for 21 years.

The Majestic's new format was a hit with sophisticated film-goers and Madison's counterculture at large. As the city's only art house cinema, it cultivated a fiercely loyal patronage that appreciated the herbal tea, cider and fresh popcorn with real butter for sale at its concessions stand. Midnight shows were often preceded by announcements of coming attractions delivered from the floor by the manager, along with the policy that "we don't care what you smoke" as long as it was smoked near the ashtray at the top of the balcony stairs. The outdated equipment was dismissed as a concern, with manager Bob Strong saying their loyal patrons "come for what's on the screen and not to hear a new sound system." Projectionist Bob Monshein fondly dubbed the non-automated 1939 projectors "Neandermation." During a 1983 appearance to benefit Madison Repertory Theatre, film critic Roger Ebert called the Majestic "a temple of art and sacred to me."

As many of the older classic films became available on video cassette in the early 1980s, the theater switched to contemporary independent films and foreign fare. In 1986, the Majestic faced competition for bookings from the new east-side Barrymore Theatre (formerly the Eastwood), but within a year the Barrymore became a mainstream $2 budget cinema with frequent live concerts. In 1987, Landmark Theaters signed a new six-year lease with 20th Century Theaters. In 1991, the Sam Goldwyn Company acquired Heritage Entertainment Inc., parent company of Landmark Theaters, but the Majestic's art house schedule was not affected.

=== 20th Century theater (1992–1999) ===
Due to the difficulty of turning a profit on a single-screen theater in the age of multiplex cinemas, Landmark Theatres Corp. let its lease expire in September 1992. As owner of the building 20th Century Theaters sought to continue independent films at the Majestic and installed their district manager Jerry Fladen to oversee operations. The city of Madison designated the building a historic landmark in 1995, but its infamously uncomfortable seats and substandard sound did little to encourage attendance. The theater also suffered from its antiquated design, with a tiny lobby and concessions area, plus the only restrooms were in the balcony. Because the auditorium was never designed for movies, the pictures were difficult to keep in focus projected from such a steep angle. Ironically the widening popularity of independent films may have doomed the theater, with the Majestic no longer holding a monopoly on the art house films that were also shown regularly at the multi-screened Hilldale and Westgate Cinemas. As attendance declined, the union projectionists stopped working there so Fladen could save on expenses.

In March 1999, Dean Fitzgerald of 20th Century Theaters announced the closing of the Majestic on the imminent sale of the building to a buyer he would not name. When the Majestic closed with its final feature Lock, Stock and Two Smoking Barrels on March 28, 1999, it had been Wisconsin's oldest continually operating theater.

=== Doane's Majestic (2000–2002) ===
The new owner of the building was indoor soccer field developer Richard Fritz, who purchased the Majestic for $248,800. In April 2000 it was announced that local restaurateur Henry Doane would lease the theater and reopen after extensive renovations. Doane had bought the 71-year-old Orpheum Theatre (with the attached Stage Door Theater) a year earlier and installed a restaurant and bar in the lobby, making him the operator of the last three commercial movie screens in downtown Madison. Admitting publicly that he may lose money on the Majestic venture, he confessed to sentimental feelings about the theater and believed it could return to its former art house glory. Fritz and Doane spent $250,000 on a new roof, a new sound system, a larger concession stand and a first-floor restroom. Seating capacity went from 537 to 400 to provide more leg room, and padded bench seats were installed in the balcony. The theater reopened on June 30, 2000 with Hamlet starring Ethan Hawke. The Majestic became one of the venues for the growing Wisconsin Film Festival. But Doane struggled to make a profit in the face of the same competition with the Westgate and Hilldale Theaters for independent film bookings and audiences. The theater stopped showing films on September 1, 2002 as a new buyer was found who planned to turn the movie house into a nightclub.

=== Club Majestic (2003–2007) ===
After his plan to develop an entertainment complex on East Washington Avenue fell through, restaurateur Nick Schiavo purchased the Majestic from Fritz for $718,000, contingent on his ability to secure the site's first liquor license. Schiavo, whose family owned Cafe Continental across the street and had owned local restaurants and bars for generations, planned to convert the theater into a combination music club and banquet facility that retained the ability to screen films. Over $300,000 was spent installing an elevated dance floor, industrial-styled mezzanine and two bars, one of them above the stage. Flashing lights were installed in the ornate gold proscenium arch and the DJ booth was the theater's original art deco concessions stand. With a capacity of 472 making it the second largest dance club in Madison, the new Club Majestic opened in February 2003 with longtime Madison DJ Nick Nice providing the music.

During the four years of its operation, Club Majestic garnered negative headlines and criticism, beginning with complaints about its $9 all-you-can-drink specials. By 2004, the club became primarily a hip hop venue, and the weekend crowds of hundreds that spilled out into the street at closing time often resulted in fistfights and smashed windows. In 2005, there were three separate incidents of gunfire, and the next year a stabbing. Madison police responded by blocking off the street to cruising vehicles, and Schiavo (and his brother Jim) implemented ID scanners and metal detectors in addition to hiring their own armed security guards, which police later said contributed to the problem. After Schiavo declared he was not responsible for what happened in the street, neighboring businesses withdrew their support, claiming the club was making their customers feel unsafe. By 2006, Schiavo himself admitted the atmosphere was "scary," but blamed insufficient numbers of police officers in an area saturated with bars. Others in the community blamed hip hop music itself, as it was seen as leading to similar violent incidents at other Madison venues. Schiavo defended hip hop as "the most popular music around these days" and "If you say 'I don't like hip hop' you're saying 'I don't like black people.'" Despite the Schiavos announcing they planned to sell the Majestic, in September 2006 Madison police attached onerous conditions to the club's liquor license, including lowering the capacity to 200 and requiring one uniformed security guard for every thirty patrons. In a compromise with the city, the club surrendered its performing arts license which had allowed DJs and underage patrons. Live shows were discontinued by the end of the year. Asking for $1.6 million, the Schiavos accepted an offer of $1.35 million for the building in March 2007 and closed the deal three months later.

=== Gerding and Leslie's Majestic (2007–present) ===
In 2007, the Majestic was acquired by Matt Gerding of Kansas City and Scott Leslie of Chicago. Gerding had booked shows at the University of Missouri, while Leslie had done the same at the University of Iowa. Leslie had also been keyboardist and tour manager for The Push Stars. Gerding and Leslie met in Los Angeles, where Gerding worked for Creative Artists Agency. Gerding had booked shows at Midwest venues and was familiar with Madison clubs such as Luther's Blues and the High Noon Saloon. Sharing an interest in running a music venue of their own, they re-opened as the Majestic Theatre on September 29, 2007 with a concert by Mandy Moore and Ben Lee.

Since then, the Majestic has featured artists of every musical genre, local and international DJs and stand-up comedians. The theater has also hosted vaudeville and burlesque shows, political rallies, "Brew & View" film nights, live concerts on King Street as well as weddings, church services and other events. Gerding and Leslie's promoting arm, Majestic Live, has booked acts into many other Madison venues as well as outside the city.
