= Coastie (disambiguation) =

Coastie is a term used in Midwestern U.S. universities to denote students who come from outside of the region.

Coastie may also refer to:

- Coastie (bicycle), a type of fixed-gear, single-speed bicycle utilizing a Coaster Brake rear hub
- Coastal defence ship
- Coasties, an informal term for a member of the United States Coast Guard
- A member of a coastguard
- A resident of a coastline

== See also ==
- Coaster (disambiguation)
- Coast (disambiguation)
