= Put the Rifle Down =

Canadian band

Put The Rifle Down
- Origin: Toronto, Ontario, Canada
- Genres: Synthpop; Indie rock Electronic dance
- Years active: 2004–present
- Labels: Summer Lovers Unlimited; Cheap Date Records
- Members: Michael Countryman; Anthony Bruno; Jordan Bimm; Mark Cassidy

Put the Rifle Down is a Canadian electronic dance band based in Toronto, Ontario, that were signed to Montreal label Summer Lovers Unlimited. Their debut full-length, Selector, was released in 2009. The band includes Michael Countryman (a.k.a. Michael DarkAges) (vocals), Anthony Bruno (drums/percussion), Jordan Bimm (guitar), and Mark Cassidy (synthesizers). The band formed while all four members were studying at the University of Toronto in 2004. NOW magazine considers their sound similar to that of New Order.

In 2007, the band had their song "Architekt" featured on a vinyl-only compilation called Hordes Of Canada that was issued in the UK by Cheap Date Records. The release also included songs by Crystal Castles, We Are Wolves, and Duchess Says and is now out of print. Drowned in Sound described "Architekt" as "glacial downbeat-pop at its most irresistible" and wrote that Arcade Fire was "an obvious influence".

The band has played the North by Northeast music festival, the CMJ festival, Pop Montreal, and Canadian Music Week. They were invited to play the 2008 South by Southwest festival in Austin, Texas, but did not make it due to visa problems. Put the Rifle Down has remixed tracks by The Coast and by the French band The Teenagers. Thunderheist remixed Put the Rifle Down's track "My Industrial Park".

On October 20, 2011, the band released an LP titled New Dance, which is their final album to date. Michael Countryman has moved on to performing in the band TV Amerika as of 2024.

== Discography ==
- Hordes of Canada (Cheap Date Records; 2007) UK Comp, vinyl only, OUT OF PRINT.
- Selector (Summer Lovers Unlimited; 2009) LP, OUT OF PRINT.
- NRG (Independent; 2010) LP.
- New Dance (Independent; 2011) LP.
