= Bucky Badger =

Mascot of the University of Wisconsin–Madison

Bucky Badger (Buckingham U. Badger)
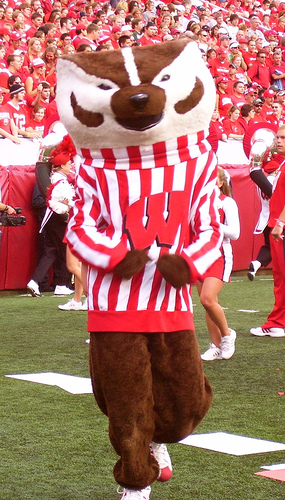
- Bucky Badger official logo (left) and Bucky Badger costumed (right)
- University: University of Wisconsin–Madison
- Conference: Big Ten
- Description: Anthropomorphic badger
- Origin of name: Winning entry in competition
- First seen: 1940
- Related mascot(s): Regdab Raccoon
- Hall of Fame: 2006

Buckingham U. "Bucky" Badger is the official mascot of the University of Wisconsin–Madison. The mascot is a badger because the state's lead miners "lived like badgers" in underground tunnels to stay warm during the winter. The mascot attends major sporting events for the Wisconsin Badgers and other events in Wisconsin.

== Origin ==
The most familiar portrayal of Bucky Badger, wearing a "W" varsity sweater with white and red stripes and strutting forward with a fierce expression, was drawn by California-based commercial artist Art Evans in 1940, and first sold from Duffy's Book Store in Madison. A popular version of Bucky sporting boxing gloves was first drawn by hometown Madison artist Thomas Spiece. An actual badger from Eau Claire was used at the first few football games that year, but proved to be too fierce to be controlled properly and was retired to the nearby Henry Vilas Zoo. After that, the school replaced the live badger with a live raccoon named Regdab ('badger' backwards). In 1948, a UW-Madison art student, Carolyn (Connie) Conrard was asked to create a papier-mâché Bucky head-piece. A UW-Madison Gymnast and cheerleader, Bill Sagal, wore the outfit at the homecoming game and a contest was started to name the mascot properly. The winning entry was Buckingham U. Badger, coming from the fight song urging the football team to "buck right through that line." A common misconception is that Bucky's middle name is Ulysses, but as stated by the Wisconsin Alumni Association, "the U. stands for U; it’s his full middle name." Bucky has been maintained over the years, even surviving a threat by the assistant attorney general, Howard Koop, who suggested that Henrietta Holstein, a loveable cow, replace Bucky.

In 2006, Bucky was inducted as a charter member of the Mascot Hall of Fame's College Division, joining YoUDee from Delaware, Sparty from the Michigan State University, and Aubie from Auburn.

== Attire and attitude ==
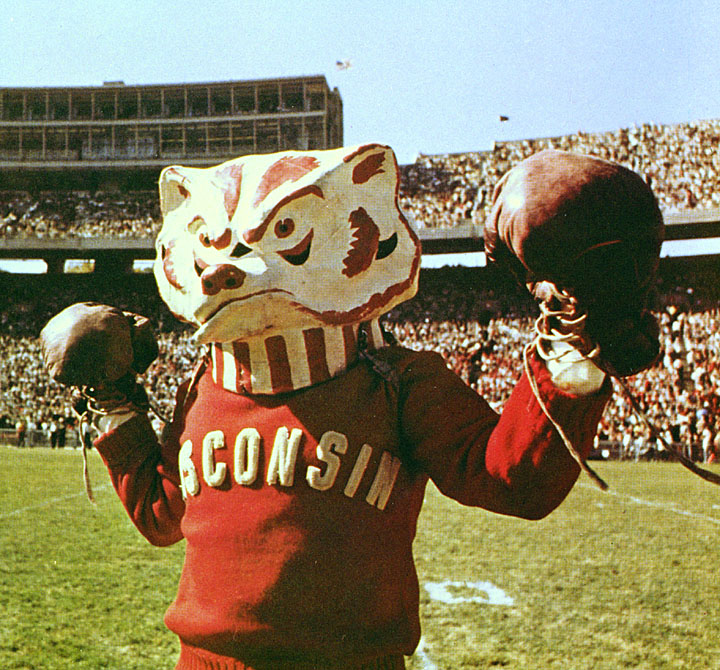
"Boxing Bucky", circa 1965

During sporting events, he is generally seen interacting with the crowd, and strutting around especially the rambunctious student section. For example, during football games Bucky often directs sections N, O, and P to dance along with the band's music or pretends to pick fights with certain students. He also has a history of playfully fighting other team's mascots like the University of Minnesota's Goldy Gopher or Purdue University's Purdue Pete. Although fighting is no longer allowed by NCAA mascots, Bucky still frequently interacts with other mascots through skits. Bucky also does push-ups to match the score after each Wisconsin touchdown, field goal, or safety. At the game versus Indiana on November 13, 2010, Bucky did 573 push-ups for the winning score of 83–20.

Billy Sagal was the first costumed Bucky Badger. The original Bucky costume was introduced at a pep rally on Friday, November 11, 1949, before the next day's Homecoming game against Iowa (Wisconsin 35, Iowa 13). A UW art student, Carolyn (Connie) Conrard designed the original chicken wire and papier-mâché head. Sagal, then head cheerleader, wore his regular cheerleader trousers and sweater and added boxing gloves.

== Logo ==
The modern Bucky Badger logo was part of a group of "comic collegiate badger mascots" created by the Anson W. Thompson Company of Los Angeles in 1940. The company was one of several that manufactured decals and other logo wear for universities. The Madison-based Brown's Book Store (no longer in business) was the first to order the pose. Other bookstores in the area ordered other poses. The UW athletic department first used the logo on the cover of the 1988 Football Facts and Centennial Sports Review.

That image of Bucky was adopted and used by many local businesses in and around Madison. In 1988 the University of Wisconsin–Madison formed a trademark licensing program to register the Bucky logo, which was opposed by local merchants. Ownership was decided in the case University Book Store v. University of Wisconsin–Madison Board of Regents. The United States Patent and Trademark Office allowed the UW to register the marks despite previous third-party use on the grounds that the public identified the Bucky Badger logo with the University of Wisconsin–Madison.

In 2003, Bucky was given an update, with simplified lines and the "motion W" on his sweater. This might have been done in part to give the university a version of Bucky that was associated with the university alone, and had never been used in any other context.

== Variations ==
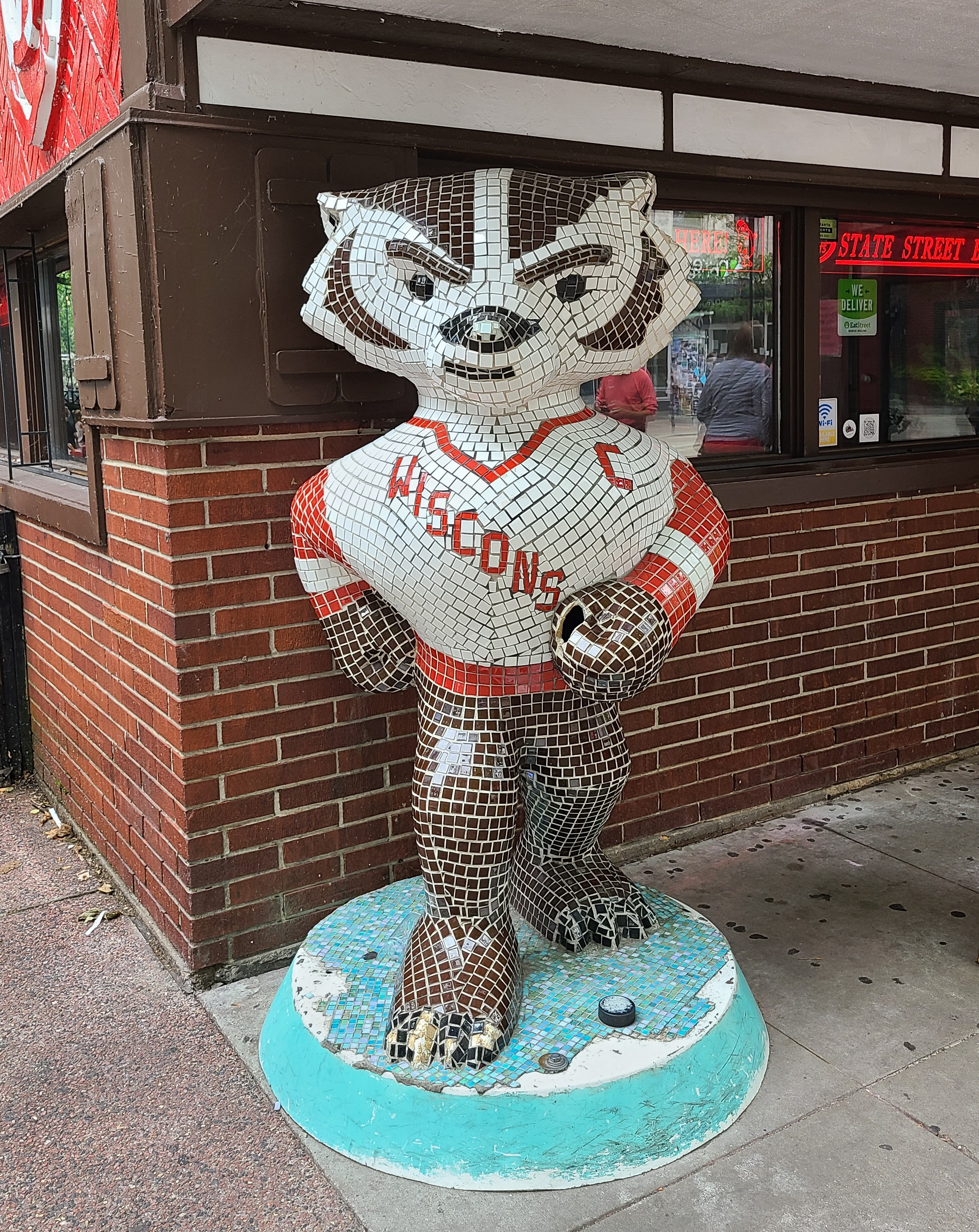
Bucky Badger statue on State Street

Academic departments and groups at UW-Madison have a rich history of modifying Bucky. Recent university guidelines, however, have banned the modification of Bucky Badger citing brand dilution despite featuring Bucky on other non-University items such as tortilla chips.

Blind Bucky is sometimes used to represent the University of Wisconsin Law School as a variation of the allegorical figure of blindfolded Lady Justice.

Two variations of "Band Bucky" are used to represent the University of Wisconsin Marching Band. One variation shows him wearing a uniform similar to the drum major's, and the other shows him wearing a normal Wisconsin Band uniform. Various instrument sections within the band have also commissioned logos that include Bucky holding their respective instruments.

Bucky with a stethoscope is occasionally used by the Medical Alumni Association.

Similarly, a design of Bucky wearing a Roman-style toga is used by the university's Classics Society (and shared with the Classics Department).

The College of Agriculture & Life Science's Short Course has a Farmer Bucky, clad in Motion W overalls and carrying a pitchfork. In addition, the Collegiate FFA has Bucky in Official Dress, including the standard FFA Jacket.

The Atmospheric & Oceanic Sciences department utilizes a design with Bucky holding a lightning bolt.

Bucky has also been known to don a laboratory coat and carry an Erlenmeyer flask in support of University of Wisconsin-Madison laboratory sciences.

Bucky also adorned the engine nacelles of the Wisconsin ANG in Madison during their tenure with the A-10 "Warthog". He was shown on both engines in all black tone, as the aircraft was in the "European one" paint at the time. This was short-lived as the unit converted to the F-16 in a short time.

== Student portrayal ==
The students (usually 7) who portray Bucky Badger are all volunteers, without scholarships or financial reimbursement, as is the system in some universities. Tryouts include tests of dancing skills, expressiveness in suit, ability to work with props, and the number of push-ups a candidate can do, as well as an interview and the ability to write and perform an original skit. The Bucky Team attends mascot training camp every year in August. They perform throughout the year, including breaks and holidays, representing the university and the state at athletic events, but also at ceremonies, parades, festivals, weddings, and even an occasional funeral.

Bucky appearances can be purchased; rates in 2007 were $250 plus $100 per hour, a "typical price" for school mascots.

== Film portrayal ==
In 2009, Bucky Badger made it to the silver screen in the documentary, Being Bucky. The film, which was created by Chicago ad-men John Fromstein and Scott Smith, both Wisconsin natives, follows the 2007–2008 Buckys: Chris, Blake, Dave, Sky, Ryan, Craig and Jeff. It was released on April 4 at the Wisconsin Film Festival and featured in theaters across the state in the following weeks. A second documentary, Bucky!, was released in 2025.

Additionally, Bucky Badger is featured prominently in a parody of the song "Teach Me How to Dougie", appropriately titled "Teach Me How to Bucky". The music video, presented by Zooniversity Music, debuted during the 2010 UW Homecoming Game at Camp Randall vs. Minnesota Golden Gophers, a 41–23 Badgers win on October 9. T-shirts displayed in the video became commercially distributed the following week at local stores such as Name of the Game Apparel and Insignia. However, despite overwhelming popularity of the video, the use of a student-athlete's portrayal in the music video at the :31 second and 1:11 mark violated NCAA compliance issues as student-athletes' likenesses were prohibited from generating the sales. Specifically, NCAA regulations stipulated that “items that include an individual student-athlete’s name, picture or likeness, other than information items, may not be sold.” In 2021, the NCAA began to allow name, image, and likeness deals.

In 2013, Bucky Badger was in the Season 2 finale episode of New Girl, "Elaine's Big Day." Bucky Badger, a live badger brought by the University of Wisconsin, gets loose in the hotel ducts where a wedding is taking place.
