= West Coaster =

West Coaster may refer to:

- a person from the West Coast of the United States
- The West Coaster (Tasmanian train), a passenger train service in Australia, 1960–1964
- The Westcoaster, a passenger train service in Victoria, Australia, 1993–2004
- Santa Monica West Coaster, a roller coaster at Pacific Park, Santa Monica, California, U.S.

== See also ==
- West (disambiguation)
- Coast (disambiguation)
- Coaster (disambiguation)
- West Coast (disambiguation)
