= Expatriate (disambiguation) =

An expatriate is a person temporarily or permanently residing in a country and culture other than that of the person's upbringing.

Expatriate may also refer to:

- Expatriate (album), a 2008 album by The Coast
- Expatriate (band), an Australian indie rock band
- Expatriates: A Novel of the Coming Collapse, novel by James Wesley Rawles, in the Patriots series
- The Expatriate (film), a 2012 Canadian-Belgian thriller film also known as Erased

== See also ==
- Expat (disambiguation)
