= Kyocera KX414 (Phantom) =

- Manufacturer: Kyocera
- Successor: Kyocera KX440/KX444
- Compatible networks: CDMA 850/1900 MHz, AMPS 850 MHz
- Dimensions: 113 mm × 48 mm × 23.1 mm (4.45 in × 1.89 in × 0.91 in)
- Weight: 100 g (3.5 oz)
- Display: 104 × 80 pixels, 65,000-color STN LCD

The KX414 is a mobile phone made by Kyocera, part of the Phantom family of phones.

The only U.S. service providers that are carrying the KX414 are U.S. Cellular, Revol Wireless, and Verizon Wireless.

Its successor is the Kyocera KX440/KX444.
