= North Coast =

North Coast or Northcoast may refer to:

== Antigua and Barbuda ==
- Major Division of North Coast, an urban area and major division in the parish of Saint John
- North Coast, Barbuda, an administrative district of Barbuda

== Australia ==
- New South Wales North Coast, a geographical basin region
- Mid North Coast an official region of New South Wales

== Canada ==
- The British Columbia Coast, primarily the communities of Prince Rupert, Terrace and Kitimat and surrounding areas
  - North Coast Regional District, a regional district of British Columbia
  - North Coast (provincial electoral district), an electoral district in British Columbia comprising the North Coast region
- Côte-Nord (North Coast), a rural region of Quebec east of Quebec City running along the north bank of the St. Lawrence River

== Egypt ==
- Northern coast of Egypt, a popular tourist resort

== Kenya ==
- The section of the Kenya coast to the north of Mombasa Island

== Scotland ==
- North Coast (North Ayrshire ward), an electoral ward in North Ayrshire

== South Africa ==
- North Coast (KwaZulu-Natal), a region located on the coastline north of Durban in the KwaZulu-Natal province

== United States ==
- Arctic Alaska, the northernmost coast of the United States
- North Coast (California), a region including Marin, Sonoma, Mendocino, Humboldt, and Del Norte counties, that is, the northern West Coast
  - North Coast AVA, an American Viticultural Area in California
  - North Coast Journal, an alternative weekly newspaper serving Humboldt County, California
  - Northcoast Marine Mammal Center, a California-based private non-profit organization
  - North Coast Brewing Company, a microbrewery in Fort Bragg, California
- The Lake Erie portion within the Niagara Frontier, especially at the west end in Ohio
  - North Coast Harbor in Cleveland
  - Northcoast PCS, a former Independence, Ohio-based prepaid mobile phone operator
  - North Coast Inland Trail, a trail in the northern part of Ohio
- North Coast Limited, an American passenger train connecting Chicago and Seattle
- New Hampshire Northcoast Corporation, a railroad operating part of the former Boston and Maine Railroad Conway Branch between Rollinsford and Ossipee
- North Coast (album)

== See also ==
- North Shore (disambiguation)
