= Shawn Eichorst =

Athletic director at the University of Wisconsin–Madison

Current position
- Title: Athletic director
- Team: Wisconsin
- Conference: Big Ten

Biographical details
- Born: Lone Rock, Wisconsin, U.S.
- Education: University of Wisconsin–Whitewater; Marquette University

Playing career
- 1987–1990: Wisconsin–Whitewater
- Position: Defensive back

Administrative career (AD unless noted)
- 1999–2003: Wisconsin–Whitewater
- 2004–2006: South Carolina (Senior Associate AD)
- 2006–2011: Wisconsin (Deputy AD)
- 2011–2012: Miami (FL)
- 2013–2017: Nebraska
- 2018–2026: Texas (Deputy AD)
- 2026–present: Wisconsin

Shawn Eichorst is an American college athletics administrator who has been the athletic director for the University of Wisconsin–Madison since July 2026. He was previously the director of athletics for the University of Miami and University of Nebraska–Lincoln.

== Early life and education ==
Eichorst was born in Lone Rock, Wisconsin. He attended University of Wisconsin–Whitewater, where he was a member of Wisconsin–Whitewater Warhawks football team, serving as a team captain and earning All-Conference honors in 1990. Following his graduation, Eichorst attended Marquette University Law School and worked as an attorney for Milwaukee law firms Borgelt, Powell, Peterson & Frauen, S.C. and Michael Best.

== Administrative career ==
In 1999, Eichorst was hired as the athletic director of the Wisconsin–Whitewater Warhawks, his alma mater. During his time, the Warhawks enjoyed tremendous success across multiple sports. After five years, Eichorst moved to become a Senior Associate Athletic Director for the South Carolina Gamecocks, overseeing the university's football and baseball programs. Eichorst moved on to become the Deputy Athletic Director for the Wisconsin Badgers, working from 2006 to 2011 under Barry Alvarez and overseeing the university's basketball program and other day-to-day operations.

=== Miami (FL) ===
On April 12, 2011, Eichorst was hired as the athletic director of the Miami Hurricanes, working under Donna Shalala, who was the fifth chancellor of the University of Wisconsin–Madison and previously hired Alvarez. Eichorst replaced Kirby Hocutt and reportedly beat out finalists Norwood Teague and Michael Kelly for the role. Weeks later, Eichorst hired then-George Mason head coach Jim Larrañaga as the university's men's basketball head coach.

=== Nebraska ===
After 18 months at Miami, Eichorst was hired as the 14th full-time athletic director of the Nebraska Cornhuskers on October 4, 2012, succeeding Tom Osborne. He officially took over after Osborne's retirement on January 2, 2013.

In 2014, Eichorst fired football head coach Bo Pellini and replaced him with Mike Riley. Eichorst stated at a press conference that Pelini hadn't won "the games that mattered the most" against top-tier opponents, opting for Riley due to his success at Oregon State. Later, on December 17, 2014, the Omaha World-Herald obtained audio of Pelini attacking Eichorst in vulgar terms while addressing his players on December 2. Pelini questioned Eichorst's integrity, calling him "a fucking lawyer who makes policies", a "total pussy" and a "total cunt". In response, Nebraska claimed that Pelini had been fired in part for "a pattern of unprofessional, disrespectful behavior" toward players, fans and Nebraska employees.

Under Riley, the Cornhuskers went 6–7 and 9–4 in 2015 and 2016, respectively. Following a 1–2 start in 2017 and a 21–17 loss to Northern Illinois, on September 21, 2017, Eichorst was fired.

After his firing, Eichorst served as the Deputy Athletic Director for the Texas Longhorns from 2018 to 2026.

=== Wisconsin ===
On July 1, 2026, Eichorst returned to Wisconsin to become the athletic director for the Badgers.

== Personal life ==
Eichorst and his wife, Kristin, have three sons: Jack, Joseph (also known as Joe) and Bennett (also known as Ben).
