= Flyover country =

American phrase for interior U.S. states

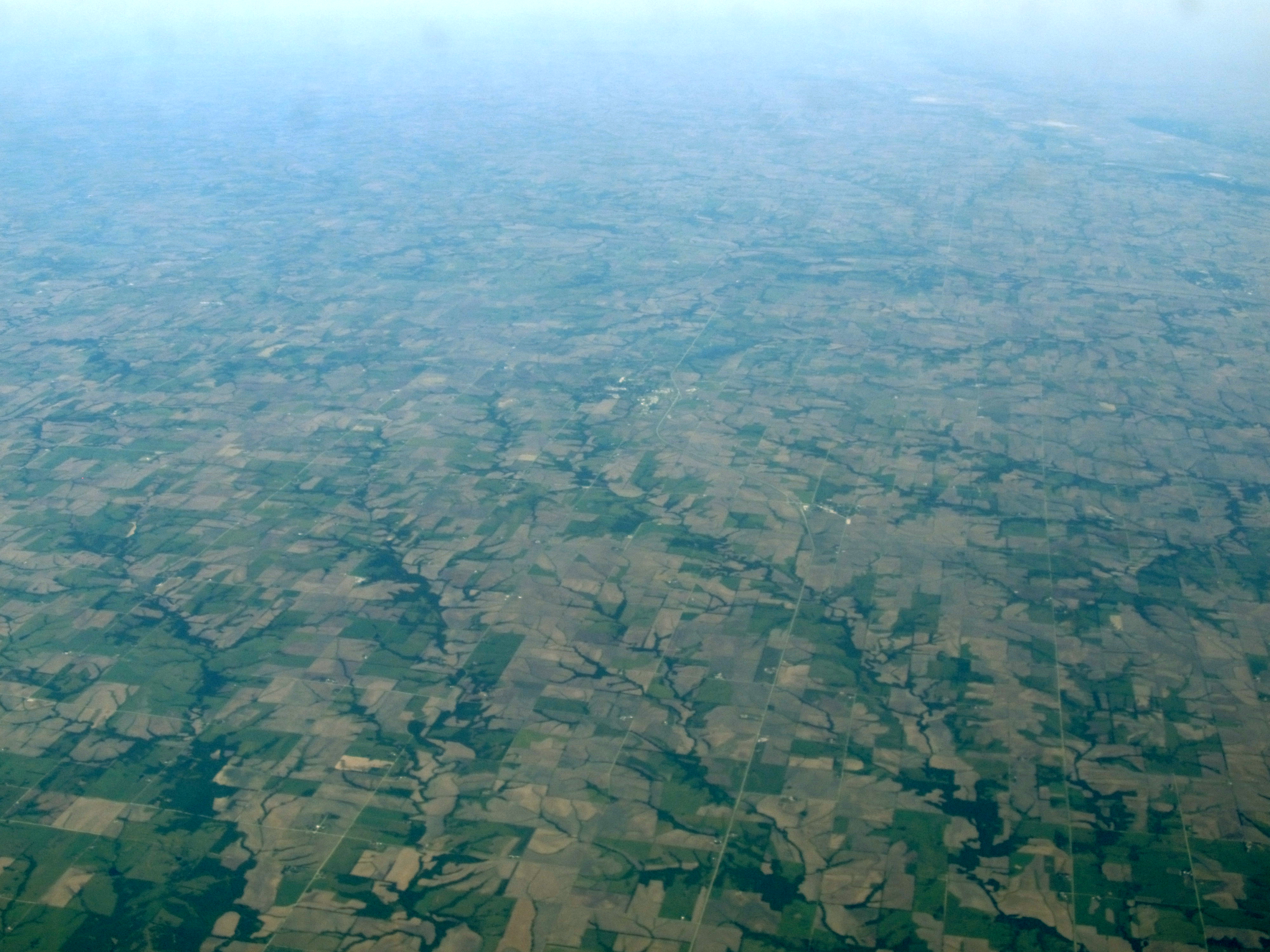
Aerial view of Kansas, the state in the center of the contiguous U.S.

Flyover country is a part of the contiguous United States between the Northeast and West Coast. The states within flyover country are flyover states.

The origins of the phrases and the attitudes of their supposed users are a source of debate in American culture; the terms are often regarded as pejoratives, but are sometimes "reclaimed" and used defensively.

== Definition ==
The terms refer to the interior regions of the country passed over during transcontinental flights, particularly flights between the nation's two most populous urban agglomerations: the Northeastern Megalopolis and Southern California. "Flyover country" thus refers to the part of the country that some Americans—especially those of urban, wealthier, white-collar status—only view by air when traveling and never actually see in person at ground level.

== See also ==
- Central United States
- Great Plains
- Heartland
- Middle America
- Midwestern United States
- Coastie, a pejorative term for people not from the Midwest, especially from the aforementioned Coasts
