= Expat (disambiguation) =

An expat is a person temporarily or permanently residing in a country and culture other than that of the person's upbringing.

Expat may also refer to:

- Expat (software), an XML parser library
- Expats (miniseries), a 2024 American drama TV series
- Expat License, a free software license

== See also ==
- Expatriate (disambiguation)
