= Coasting =

Coasting may refer to:

- Sailing with a course that follows and thus remains close to a coast and its anchorages, harbours and ports
- Coasting (vehicle), performing a natural deceleration of a motor when the power is removed
- Carrying out a part of a spaceflight without orbital maneuver
- Sledding
- Performing ovarian hyperstimulation without inducing ovulation with human chorionic gonadotropin (hCG)
- Inertial scrolling with touch interface

== Books ==
- Coasting (book), a travel book by Jonathan Raban

== Music ==
- "Coasting", song by A Band Called O
- "Coasting", song by Free All Angels from There's a Star
- "Coasting", song by Great Gable from Tracing Faces

== See also ==
- Coast (disambiguation)
