= Wisconsin Badgers =

Intercollegiate sports teams of the University of Wisconsin-Madison

- University: University of Wisconsin–Madison
- Nickname: Badgers
- NCAA: Division I (FBS)
- Conference: Big Ten (primary); Western Collegiate Hockey Association (women's ice hockey); EARC (men's rowing)
- Athletic director: Shawn Eichorst
- Location: Madison, Wisconsin
- Varsity teams: 25 (12 men’s and 13 women’s)
- Football stadium: Camp Randall Stadium
- Basketball arena: Kohl Center
- Ice hockey arena: Kohl Center (men); LaBahn Arena (women)
- Soccer stadium: McClimon Stadium
- Other venues: UW Field House
- Colors: Cardinal and white
- Mascot: Bucky Badger
- Fight song: On, Wisconsin!
- Website: uwbadgers.com

The Wisconsin Badgers are the athletic teams representing the University of Wisconsin–Madison. They compete as a member of the National Collegiate Athletic Association (NCAA) Division I level (Football Bowl Subdivision (FBS) sub-level), primarily competing in the Big Ten Conference since the 1896–97 season. The women's ice hockey team competes in the Western Collegiate Hockey Association (WCHA), while the men's crew team competes in the Eastern Association of Rowing Colleges (EARC).

The athletic director is Shawn Eichorst, who replaced Chris McIntosh after he departed for a role with the Big Ten Conference. The Badgers team colors are cardinal and white, and the team mascot is named "Buckingham U. Badger," known as "Bucky Badger." The Badgers have several major on-campus facilities, including Camp Randall Stadium, the UW Field House, and the Kohl Center.

== Team name origin ==
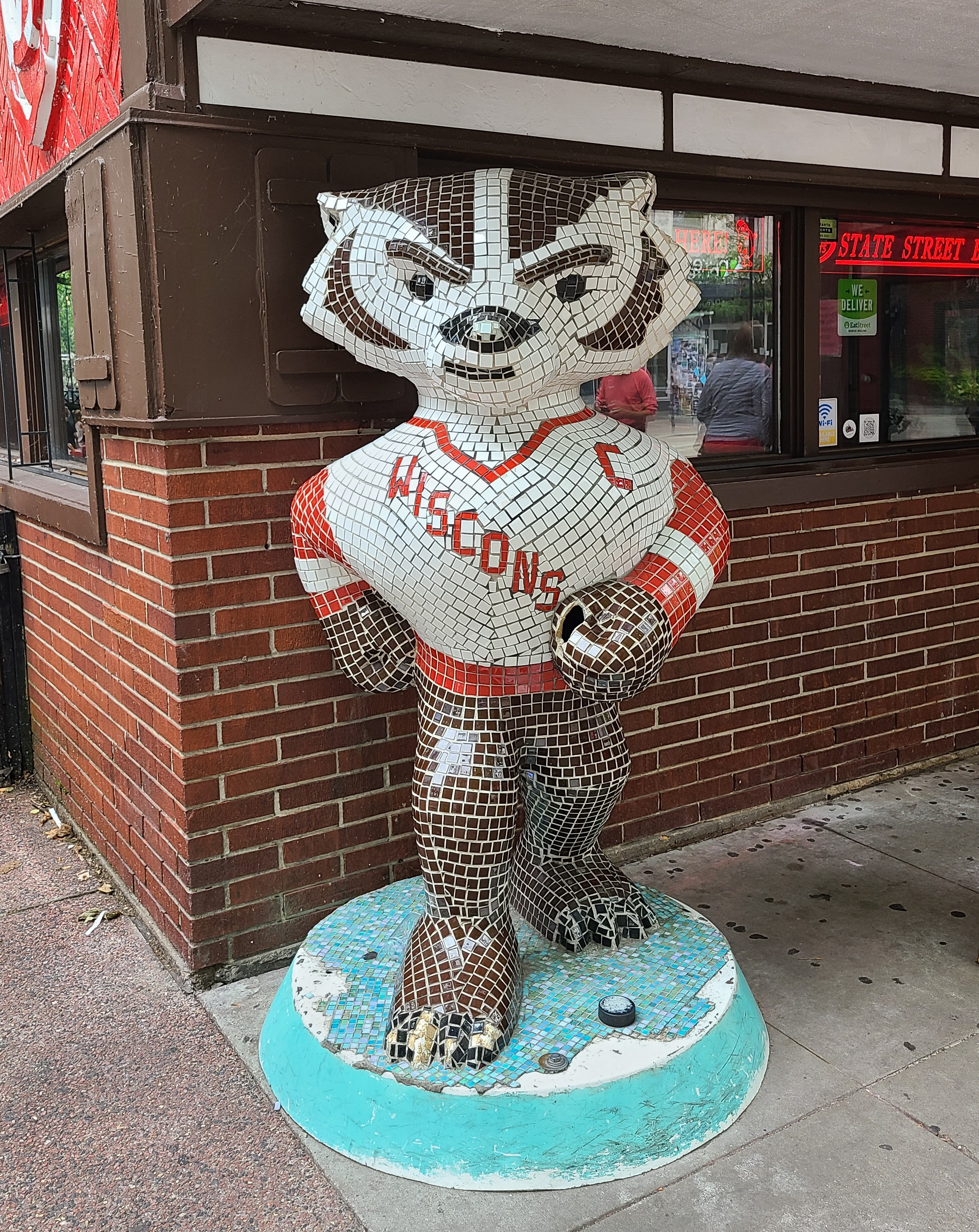
Bucky Badger statue on State Street

Wisconsin was dubbed the "Badger State" because of the lead miners who first settled there in the 1820s and 1830s. Without shelter in the winter, they had to "live like badgers" in tunnels burrowed into hillsides. The badger mascot was adopted by the University of Wisconsin in 1889.

His name, "Buckingham U. Badger", a.k.a. "Bucky Badger," was chosen in a contest in 1949. The emblem, a scowling, strutting badger wearing a cardinal-and-white striped sweater, was designed by Art Evans in 1940 and updated in 2003. A live badger from Eau Claire was used at the first few football games that year, but proved to be too fierce to be controlled and was retired to the nearby Henry Vilas Zoo. For a time, the school replaced the live badger with a live raccoon named "Regdab" ("badger" backwards).

In 2006, Bucky Badger became a charter member of the Mascot Hall of Fame's College Division. Bucky Badger has a tradition of doing the number of pushups that the football team has every time they score.

== Sports sponsored ==
Big Ten logo in Wisconsin's colors

Men's sports	Women's sports
Basketball	Basketball
Cross country	Cross country
Football	Golf
Golf	Ice hockey
Ice hockey	Rowing
Rowing	Rowing lightweight
Soccer	Soccer
Swimming and diving	Softball
Tennis	Swimming and diving
Track and field^{†}	Tennis
Wrestling	Track and field^{†}
	Volleyball
† – Track and field includes both indoor and outdoor

Wisconsin is the only Big Ten school and one of only five Power 5 schools that do not sponsor baseball, the other four being Colorado, Iowa State, SMU and Syracuse. Wisconsin previously sponsored a baseball team, but discontinued it after the 1991 season. Wisconsin is also the only Big Ten school with a varsity men's rowing program. Badger men's rowing has won 9 national championships, making it Wisconsin's most successful athletics program.

=== Men's basketball ===
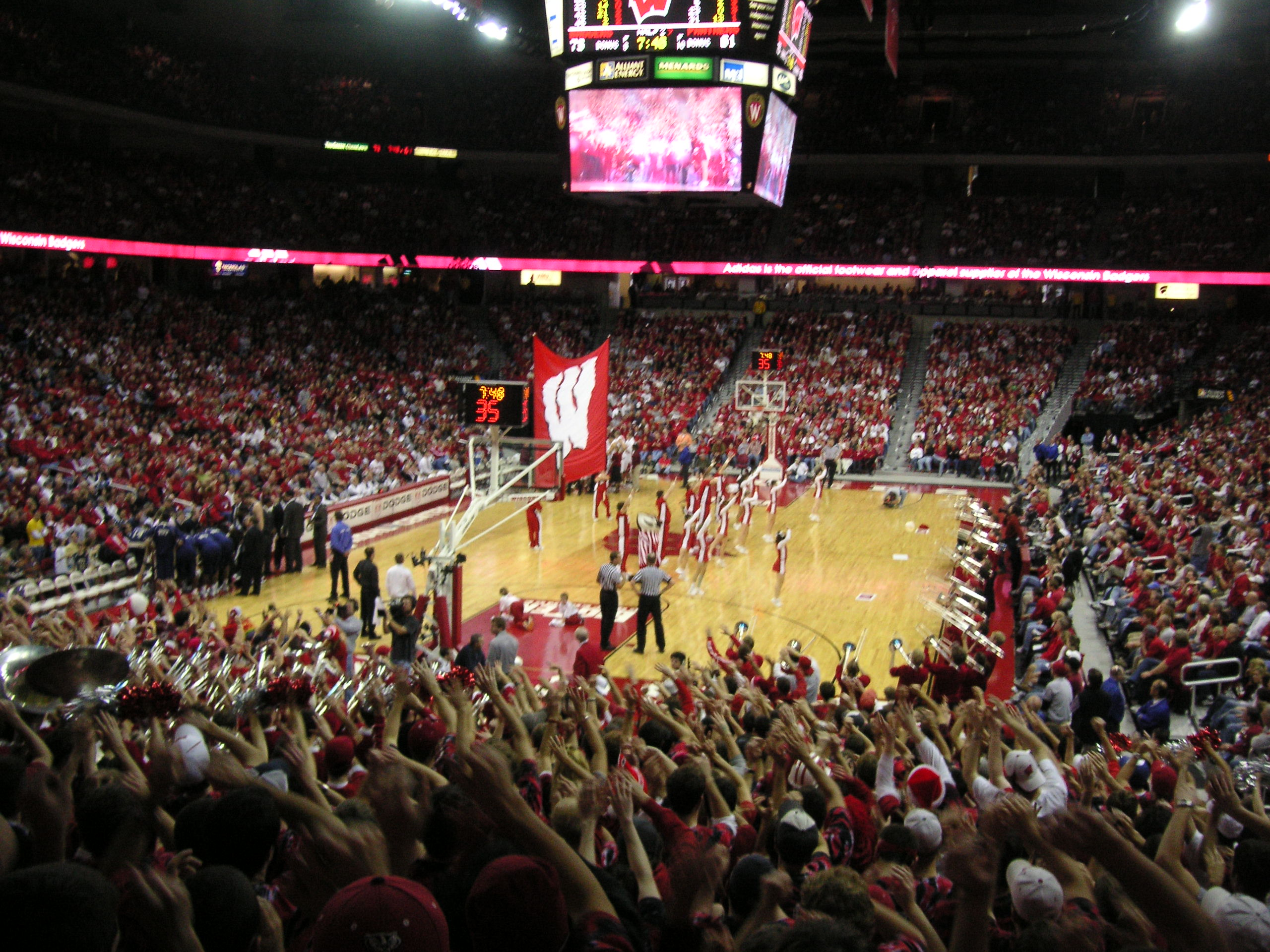
Men's basketball game at the Kohl Center in 2006

Wisconsin has made it to the NCAA Final Four four times in its history — back-to-back trips in 2014 and 2015, in 2000, and in 1941, when it won the national championship. The Badgers participated in the NCAA tournament for 19 consecutive seasons (1999–2017). Wisconsin tied for first place in the Big Ten in the 2001–02 season, along with Indiana, Illinois, and Ohio State. In 2002–03 the Badgers won the Big Ten outright, but then lost in the quarterfinals of the Big Ten tournament to Ohio State. In the NCAA Tournament, Wisconsin lost to Kentucky in the Sweet 16. In 2003–04, Wisconsin finished second in the Big Ten. The team went on to win the program's first Big Ten tournament title. However, the Badgers lost to 3rd-seeded Pittsburgh in the second round of the NCAA Tournament. In the 2004–05 season Wisconsin finished third in the Big Ten. In the 2005 NCAA Tournament, Wisconsin advanced to the Elite Eight by defeating 11th-seeded Northern Iowa, 14th-seeded Bucknell, and 10th-seeded North Carolina State. In 2005–06 the Badgers lost to Indiana in the Big Ten tournament quarterfinals, and to Arizona in the first round of the NCAA Tournament. The highlight of the season was a win over intrastate rival Marquette.

In the 2006–07 season the Badgers had victories at Marquette and at home against 2nd ranked Pittsburgh. Its lone non-conference loss was against Missouri State. On February 19, 2007, they earned their first No. 1 ranking in school history with a 26–2 record, but were defeated the next day by unranked Michigan State. Entering the Big 10 Tournament as the second seed, their first game was against Michigan State, who the Badgers defeated 70–57. In the next round against Illinois, the Badgers won 53–41 and advanced to the final to face No. 1-ranked Ohio State. The Buckeyes defeated the Badgers 66–49. In the NCAA Tournament, Wisconsin received a Number 2 seed in the Midwest bracket. The Badgers defeated Texas A&M–Corpus Christi. The second round of the tournament proved fatal for the Badgers, who lost to UNLV.

Dick Bennett is largely credited with beginning the turnaround of the program. During his six-year tenure at Wisconsin (1995–2000), the Badgers achieved a 91–68 record and had two 20-win seasons. Only twice previously had the Badgers won at least 20 games in a season, the most recent being the 1940–41 championship season. Coach Bo Ryan has been in charge since the 2001–02 season and has led the Badgers to the NCAA Tournament every year. During the 2006–07 season, he not only achieved his 500th win as a college coach but the Badgers were also ranked Number 1 in the AP Top for the first time in program history. On December 12, 2009, Ryan earned his 200th win with the Badgers (against 75 losses), defeating in-state rival Marquette. During the 2014–2015 season, the Badgers reached the National Championship game, but lost to Mike Krzyzewski's Duke squad.

Badgers currently in the NBA include Sam Dekker, Frank Kaminsky, Devin Harris, Greg Stiemsma and Jon Leuer.

=== Football ===
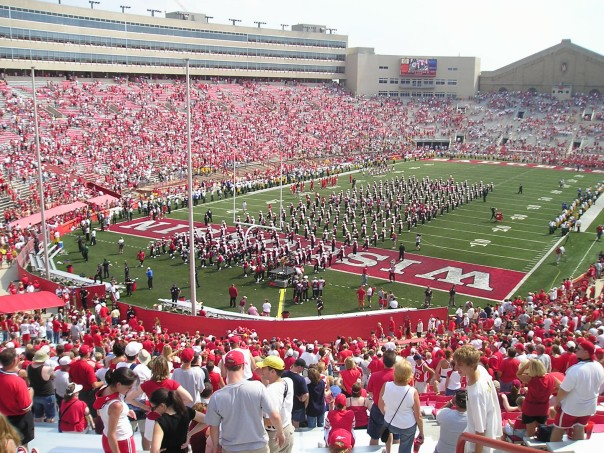
Camp Randall Stadium, home to Wisconsin football team, 2006

Wisconsin's football program has been among the most successful in the Big Ten since the early 1990s, when Barry Alvarez was hired as head coach. Under Alvarez, the Badgers won three Big Ten Championships and three Rose Bowls. In the 2005 season, Alvarez's last year as coach, the Badgers defeated Auburn 24–10, in the Capital One Bowl. In 2006, Bret Bielema took over as head coach, posting a 12–1 record and defeating Arkansas 17–14, in the Capital One Bowl. On December 5, 2012, Bielema announced his departure for Arkansas, stating, "I just felt it was time for me to try and spread my wings and fly a little bit further." Bielema was Alvarez's handpicked successor, and he coached the Badgers in their return to the Rose Bowl. The Badgers are 16–14 in bowl games, and have made 14 bowl appearance in the past 15 seasons, including a school record seven straight appearances. The Badger football program has had two Heisman Trophy winners: fullback Alan Ameche in 1954, and running back Ron Dayne in 1999. They came close in the 2011–2012 season, with their running back Montee Ball, who was a finalist but lost to Robert Griffin III (RG3). Running back Melvin Gordon was runner-up in 2014.Under Paul Chryst they have won 4 straight bowl games and 2 NY6 bowl wins in the Cotton and Orange bowls and never winning less than 8 games in a season in his 4 years.

The Wisconsin Badgers football team plays its home games at Camp Randall Stadium. Built in 1917, Camp Randall is the fourth-oldest college football stadium in the country and has a capacity of 80,321. The student section at Camp Randall is considered by many to be one of the best in all of college football. Among the stadium traditions is a well-known student celebration to the House of Pain song "Jump Around," occurring at the end of the third quarter of every home game. The students also sing songs in unison, including "Sweet Caroline" and "(Build Me Up) Buttercup". The University of Wisconsin Marching Band performs its "Fifth Quarter" after every game.

=== Ice hockey ===
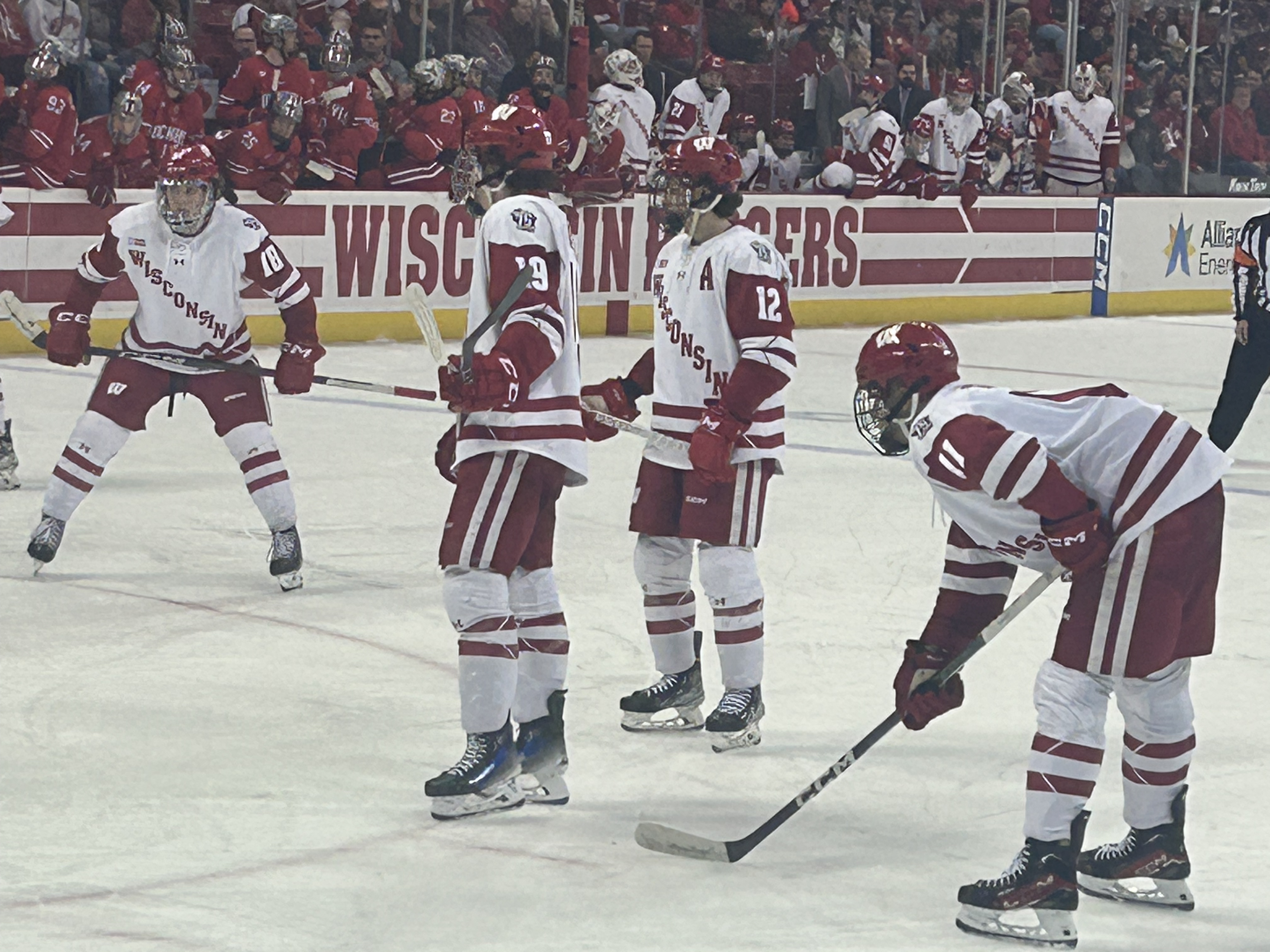
Wisconsin men's players in 2024

The Badger men won their sixth national championship in 2006, at the Bradley Center in Milwaukee, with a 2–1 victory over Boston College Eagles. The men's team had previously won the national championship in 1973, 1977, 1981, 1983, and 1990.

The Badger women won their first title in 2006, at Mariucci Arena in Minneapolis, with a 3–0 victory over the defending champion Minnesota Golden Gophers. This was the first women's hockey national championship for Wisconsin and the first time that the NCAA Women's National Championship trophy left the state of Minnesota. (Minnesota-Duluth won the trophy in 2001, 2002, and 2003; Minnesota won it in 2004 and 2005.) The victory did, however, continue the Western Collegiate Hockey Association's dominance of the women's crown. On March 18, 2007, the Badger women captured the back-to-back national championship with a 4–1 win over Minnesota-Duluth at Herb Brooks Arena, in Lake Placid, New York. The Badgers returned to the national championship game in 2008, but suffered a 4–0 loss at the hands of Minnesota-Duluth. In 2009, the Badgers became the first team in NCAA history to reach the title game in four consecutive seasons, winning their third national championship with a 5–0 victory over Mercyhurst. The Badgers went on to win their fourth national championship in 2011, defeating Boston University 4–1 at Tullio Arena in Erie, Pennsylvania.

Mike Eaves was the head coach of the men's hockey team until March 2016, while Mark Johnson coaches the women's hockey team. Both coaches were teammates on the Badgers' 1977 NCAA title team. Former Denver Pioneers head coach George Gwozdecky, the only other person besides Eaves and Johnson to win ice hockey national championships as both a player and head coach, was also a member of Wisconsin's 1977 national championship team.

The men's team plays their home games at the Kohl Center in Madison. The women's team plays their home games at LaBahn Arena. Both teams use the LaBahn Arena as a practice facility.

=== Softball ===
The Badgers softball team began play in 1996. The team has made seven NCAA Tournament appearances in 2001, 2002, 2005, 2013, 2014, 2017, and 2018. The current head coach is Yvette Healy.

=== Wrestling ===
The University of Wisconsin wrestling team was established in 1911. Through the 2018–19 season, the UW Badger wrestling team has had 18 NCAA champions, 70 Big Ten champions, 112 All-Americans, and 4 Olympians. Home dual meets and tournaments take place at the Wisconsin Fieldhouse. Barry Davis served as head coach of the program for 25 years until his retirement in 2018. Former South Dakota State University head coach Chris Bono, took over as Wisconsin's head coach at the start of the 2018–19 season.

=== Rowing ===
The University of Wisconsin–Madison has a long-standing tradition in collegiate rowing, with both men's and women's programs achieving national recognition.

Men's rowing at Wisconsin began in 1874, making it one of the oldest collegiate rowing programs in the United States. The team gained national prominence in the early 20th century and won its first Intercollegiate Rowing Association (IRA) national championship in 1951. The Badgers men's varsity eight went on to claim further IRA titles in 1959, 1966, 1973, 1974, and 2008. Wisconsin has consistently remained competitive at the national level, frequently earning invitations to the IRA Regatta.

Women's rowing was established as a club sport in the early 1970s and gained varsity status in 1974 following the passage of Title IX. The women's team has since developed into a strong national program. They have qualified for the NCAA Rowing Championships numerous times and earned top-ten finishes, including a team-best fourth-place finish in 2009. Wisconsin women's rowing has also secured Big Ten Conference championships and regularly produces All-Americans.

The program trains out of the Porter Boathouse on Lake Mendota, a state-of-the-art facility that opened in 2005, and remains a central part of the university's athletic tradition.

=== Spirit Squad ===
The University of Wisconsin–Madison Spirit Squad is composed of the university's Dance Team, Cheerleading Team, and mascot Bucky Badger. The squad supports athletic teams at events throughout the year and represents the university at national competitions and public appearances.

==== Dance Team ====
The Wisconsin Dance Team is a collegiate spirit and performance group that represents the university at athletic events, community outreach functions, and national dance competitions. The team performs at all home football games at Camp Randall Stadium and men's basketball games at the Kohl Center. Performances include jazz, pom, and hip-hop routines.

The dance team competes annually at the Universal Dance Association (UDA) College Nationals, held in Orlando, Florida. The team has regularly placed among the top ten in Division I, with notable performances in both the jazz and pom categories. In 2024, the team advanced to the semi-final round in both divisions.

== Championships ==
=== NCAA team championships ===
Wisconsin has won 34 NCAA national championships:

- Men's (22)
  - Basketball (1): 1941
  - Boxing (8): 1939 (unofficial), 1942 (unofficial), 1943 (unofficial), 1947 (unofficial), 1948, 1952, 1954, 1956
  - Cross Country (5): 1982, 1985, 1988, 2005, 2011
  - Ice Hockey (6): 1973, 1977, 1981, 1983, 1990, 2006
  - Indoor Track & Field (1): 2007
  - Soccer (1): 1995
- Women's (12)
  - Cross Country (2): 1984, 1985
  - Ice Hockey (9): 2006, 2007, 2009, 2011, 2019, 2021, 2023, 2025, 2026
  - Volleyball (1): 2021
- See also:
  - List of NCAA schools with the most NCAA Division I championships
  - Big Ten Conference NCAA national team championships

=== Other national team championships ===
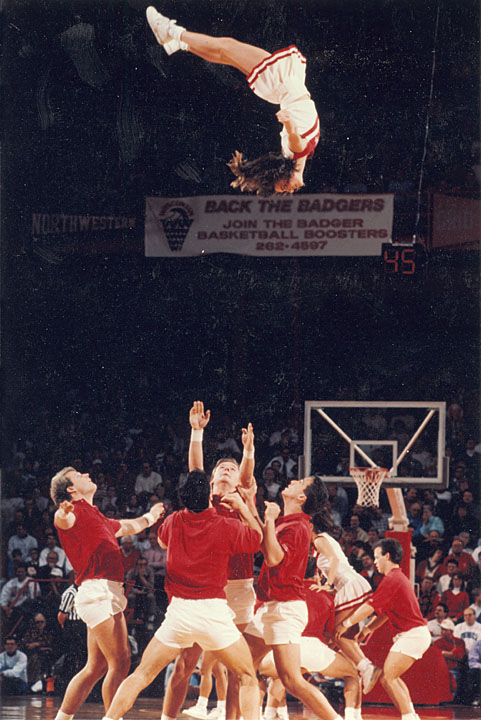
Cheerleaders at a halftime game.

Below are 22 national team titles that were not bestowed by the NCAA:

- Men's (13)
  - Basketball (3): 1912, 1914, 1916 (retroactive Helms and Premo-Porretta selections)
  - Football (1): 1942 (Helms; unclaimed)
  - Rowing (9): 1951, 1959, 1966, 1973, 1974, 1975, 1986†, 1990, 2008
- Women's (9)
  - Badminton (1): 1983
  - Indoor Track & Field (1): 1978
  - Rowing (2): 1975, 1986
  - Lightweight Rowing (5): 2004, 2005, 2006, 2008, 2009

† All men's and women's rowing titles above included winning the eights. The men's 1986 title was not an IRA championship but rather a now-defunct finals-only meet that included three rowing squads with a history of snubbing the IRAs. In 1990, Wisconsin's men's titles included both this event and the IRA eights championship.

- See also:
  - List of Big Ten Conference national championships
  - List of NCAA schools with the most Division I national championships

== Athletes of the Year ==
Year	Male athlete	Sport	Female athlete	Sport	Ref.
2013	Michael Lihrman	Men's track and field	Alex Rigsby	Women's ice hockey	
2014	Frank Kaminsky	Basketball	Ivy Martin	Swimming	
2015	Zach Ziemek	Men's track and field	Ann-Renée Desbiens	Women's ice hockey	

== Trademark dispute ==
The University of Wisconsin has been involved in disputes with a number of high schools, including Westside High School in Omaha, Nebraska, and schools in Iowa, New Jersey, North Carolina, Ohio, Texas, Virginia, and West Virginia, as well as with D-II Washburn University in Topeka, Kansas. The issue involved the use of the Badgers' athletic logo, the "motion W". As a result of the litigation, the high schools involved were required to change their logos.
