= Wisconsin Film Festival =

Annual film festival in the United States

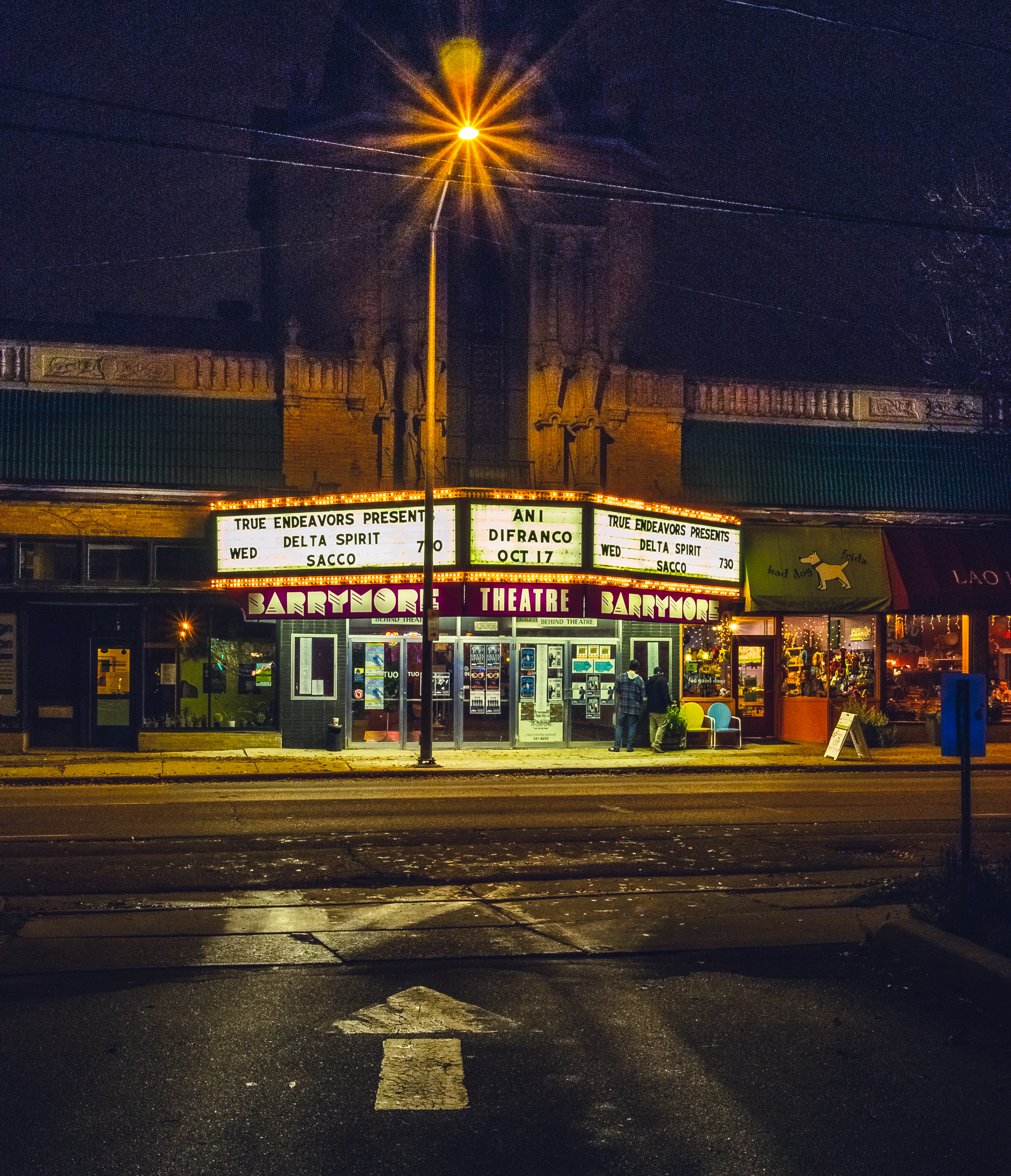
- Location: Madison, Wisconsin, U.S. Barrymore Theatre, Madison, U.S.
- Founded: April 1999; 27 years ago
- Founded by: University of Wisconsin-Madison
- Awards: Golden Badger, Audience Award
- Directors: Mike King (Artistic Director); Ben Reiser (Wisconsin's Own Programmer)
- Hosted by: University of Wisconsin-Madison
- Language: English
- Website: wifilmfest.org

The Wisconsin Film Festival is an annual film festival, founded in 1999. The festival is held every April in Madison, Wisconsin, and has over the years expanded from five days to eight days..

The Festival presents a broad range of independent American and world cinema (narrative, documentary, experimental, shorts), restorations and revivals, and locally made pictures from Wisconsin filmmakers. Presented by the University of Wisconsin–Madison's Department of Communication Arts, this is one of the largest campus-based film festivals in the United States.

In 2019 the festival reported an attendance of 29,280, with 153 films shown in 156 screenings across seven screens and five venues, supported by 178 volunteers. In recent years the festival has expanded it's footprint to include several off-campus venues on Madison's east side, including Flix Brewhouse, the Bartell Theatre and the historic Barrymore Theatre. The 2025 festival featured nearly 90 programs across eight days, with a mixed lineup of original Wisconsin made films, as well as international selections, repertory screenings, and repertory-style revivals including UW-Madison alumnus David Koepp, who introduced a special screening of his 2012 film Premium Rush.

== Awards ==
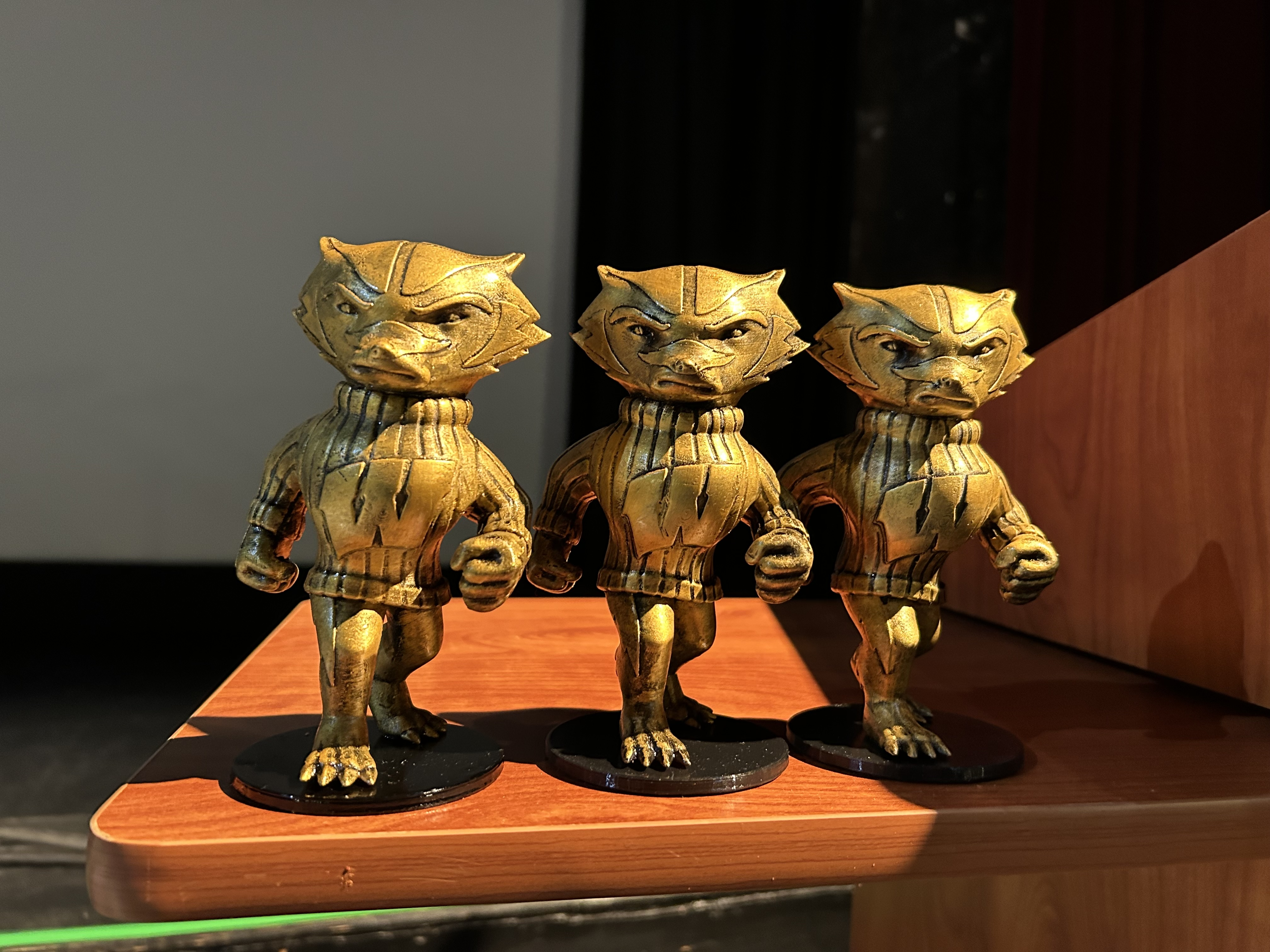
Golden Badger Award – Wisconsin Film Festival

Each year, the Wisconsin Film Festival presents an award known as a "Golden Badger" (based on the mascot of UW-Madison, Bucky Badger). The Golden Badger Awards are selected by a small jury composed of previous recipients, local film critics, and other film community members invited by the festival to judge. Only films screened as part of the WIsconsin's Own section of the festival are eligible to be considered for a Golden Badger. Additionally, the festival awards a host of Audience Choice awards, which as the name implies, are voted for by attendees.

== See also ==
- Film industry in Wisconsin
