= The Coast (EP) =

EP by The Coast
- Released: March 7, 2006 (Canada); May 29, 2007 (US)
- Recorded: Audiolab Recording Company, Toronto, Ontario, Canada
- Genre: Indie rock
- Length: 24:00
- Label: Self-released; Aporia Records
- Producer: Chris Hegge, The Coast

The Coast chronology
The Coast (2006)	Expatriate (2008)

The Coast is the debut EP from Toronto, Ontario, Canada-based indie rock group The Coast. The EP was first self-released in Canada on March 7, 2006, then released in the US by Aporia Records on May 29, 2007. The EP was produced by the band and Chris Hegge, who also provided backing vocals on "Evening's Heights." In 2004, when The Coast was known as The July 26th Movement, they released an EP titled Take a Walk Outside, featuring an early version of the song of the same name found on the self-titled EP.

The EP garnered critical acclaim in the Canadian music press. Rob Bolton of Canadian music magazine Exclaim! hailed: "The Coast are yet another example of the increasingly talented and seemingly unstoppable Canadian indie music scene."

== Track listing ==
All songs written by The Coast.

1. "All Farewells" – 3:43
2. "Circles" – 4:44
3. "Take a Walk Outside" – 3:15
4. "The Lines Are Cut" – 4:30
5. "Evening's Heights" – 2:53
6. "Harbour Lights" – 4:54

== Credits ==
- The Coast are:
  - Ian Fosbery – guitars
  - Jordan Melchiorre – drums
  - Luke Melchiorre – bass, vocals
  - Ben Spurr – vocals, guitars
- Produced by Chris Hegge and The Coast.
- Additional vocals on track 5 by Chris Hegge.
- Engineered, recorded and mixed by Chris Hegge at Audiolab Recording Company, Toronto, Ontario.
- Mastered by Ryan A. Mills at Little King Studio, Toronto, Ontario.
- Cover photography by Elyse Connery.
- Inside jacket photography by Jess Baumung.
- Design by The Coast.
- The Coast Music #COCD0000001. Aporia Records #APCD-027.
