= The Coaster =

- Type: Weekly newspaper
- Format: Tabloid
- Owner(s): Michael Booth
- Editor: Ellen Carroll
- Founded: June 1983
- Headquarters: Asbury Park, New Jersey, United States
- Circulation: 4,000
- Website: thecoaster.net

The Coaster is a weekly newspaper based in Asbury Park, New Jersey. The Coaster covers a number of Jersey Shore area communities in central Monmouth County, including: Asbury Park, Allenhurst, Avon, Bradley Beach, Deal, Interlaken, Loch Arbour, Neptune, Neptune City, Oakhurst, Ocean Grove, Ocean Township, Tinton Falls, Wanamassa, and Wayside. The paper is published every Thursday and is sold at local businesses and newsstands, as well as through subscriptions. Its layout is a tabloid format.

The Coaster was started in June 1983 by Robert F. Carroll, while he was working as an environmental reporter for the New York Daily News. Mr. Carroll began his career as a reporter for the Freehold Transcript (now called the News Transcript) and also wrote for the Asbury Park Press and The Philadelphia Inquirer. He is currently retired, but is still involved with The Coaster and lives in Asbury Park with his wife Doris, who is the paper's socialights editor.

It has a circulation of 4,000.
