= Beef (rapper) =

American journalist

Clifton Grefe (born October 12, 1989), also known by the name Beef or Beefy, is an American rapper, singer, record producer, songwriter, author, sociologist and journalist from Madison, Wisconsin.

== Career ==
Growing up in Token Creek, Wisconsin, Beef began writing poetry, performing spoken word, singing, whistling, beatboxing and dancing at a young age. He started rapping over industry tunes during his early teens.

Grefe attended University of Wisconsin–Madison in the Fall of 2008. During his time in college, he also worked for 93.1 JAMZ (WJQM) as a part-time on-air personality and producer, for The Badger Herald as a staff writer, for Wisconsin Union Theater as a marketing intern, and a bartender for several bars in downtown Madison. He graduated in the spring of 2013 with degrees in Sociology and Spanish.

Grefe received national notoriety for his debut single, "Coastie Song (What's A Coastie)." The record, although intended to be flirtatious towards coasties, offended many. Some called the song "xenophobic" and others – "anti-Semitic." Beef and producer Quincy Kwalae adopted the name Zooniversity Music, following their premiere. The group's next release, "My Biddy," was also met with questions. Rich Albertoni of The Isthmus said that some would find the love song to the lesbian chancellor "funny," while others would see it as "offensive." Zooniversity would eventually drop their debut mixtape, The Red Zebra Exhibit, on May 17, 2010.

Later that year, the group premiered their first music video "Teach Me How To Bucky" during the 2010 UW Homecoming game. The song was a remix to Cali Swag District's popular "Teach Me How to Dougie" record. Within 24 hours of the release, the song was No. 6 on YouTube for most viewed music videos. Its popularity sparked a trend and others followed with pride songs about schools, teams, cities, and states. Madison Area Music Awards named "Teach Me How To Bucky" the video of the year for 2011. After disputes within the group, Zooniversity came to an end.

Grefe dropped his first solo mixtape Chapter 1: The Sun & Moon on October 31, 2011. The artist then launched the website for Basement Made, his production and publication company, in mid-August 2012. He coined the slogan "it all started in the basement..." around this time. He followed the double-sided indie album up with The GRIME TAPE EP on April 8, 2013. Beef was nominated for song of the year for the 2014 Wisconsin Area Music Industry Awards as a featured artist on Anthony Lamarr's "Elevation."

Grefe relocated to California in early 2015 for an editorial internship at HipHopDX. After 3 months, he was offered a freelance contributor position there (#1 contributor). Shortly after, Grefe re-launched the Basement Made website and wrote the company's mission statement, expressing his desire to better represent the independent art, urban and rural culture of Wisconsin, the Midwest and the north.

From March 2015 to March 2017, the artist resided in Los Angeles, working, and gearing up to release his 27-track concept album Chapter II: Double Major, along with other music. Clifton announced that he'd be releasing the project as separate EP's that compose the full project – one every month. The first called Chapter II: The Hustle premiered on January 15, 2016. The artist then debuted his Chapter II: The Fall In a month later on February 22, 2016. The next project, called Chapter II: The Depression, was released on April 16, 2016, and Chapter II: The Bars followed on June 9, 2016. About a year later, the artist dropped the rest of the EPs. Beef released the full album on July 5, 2017.

Grefe published a critical article about Midwest Hip Hop on November 9, 2015, called Madison Hip Hop Needs Renaissance To Pop. Then another on March 24, 2016, named The Wisconsin Soul: The Best Rappers Out Of The Badger State. The artist became an author on January 20, 2017, when he published his first book through Basement Made, entitled Why Wisconsin Voted For Donald Trump: The Coastie Privilege.

Shortly after the release, Grefe returned to his hometown, where he started writing his second book and autobiography The Life of Cliff G: DOG. The artist and webmaster published his progress live to his website for several months. Beef delivered the first set of tracks for his largely freestyled, multilingual Chapter III: God album on January 31, 2019. He continued to add records to the project after the initial release date, and produced over 500 songs for the one project.

== Discography ==
=== EPs ===
Title	Album details
The Red Zebra Exhibit (with Zooniversity)	Released: May 17, 2010; Label: Self-released; Formats: digital download
The Hustle	Released: January 15, 2016; Label: Self-released; Formats: digital download
The Fall In	Released: February 22, 2016; Label: Self-released; Formats: digital download
The Depression	Released: April 16, 2016; Label: Self-released; Formats: digital download
The Bars	Released: June 9, 2016; Label: Self-released; Formats: digital download
The Fall Out	Released: July 2, 2017; Label: Self-released; Formats: digital download
The Producer	Released: July 3, 2017; Label: Self-released; Formats: digital download
The Move Out West	Released: July 3, 2017; Label: Self-released; Formats: digital download
The Home State	Released: July 5, 2017; Label: Self-released; Formats: digital download
The Remixes	Released: July 5, 2017; Label: Self-released; Formats: digital download

=== Mixtapes/Albums ===
Title	Album details
Chapter 1: The Sun & Moon	Released: October 31, 2011; Label: Self-released; Formats: digital download
The GRIME TAPE	Released: April 8, 2013; Label: Self-released; Formats: digital download
Chapter II: Double Major	Released: July 5, 2017; Label: Self-released; Formats: digital download
Chapter III: God	Released: January 31, 2019; Label: Self-released; Formats: digital download
The MAD TAPE	Released: June 4, 2020; Label: Self-released; Formats: digital download
