= Coaster (Southern Pacific Railroad train) =

Former passenger train in California, US

Overview
- Service type: Inter-city rail
- Status: Discontinued
- Locale: California
- Predecessor: Coast Line Limited
- First service: February 28, 1906
- Last service: October 2, 1949
- Successor: Starlight
- Former operator: Southern Pacific

Route
- Termini: San Francisco; Los Angeles

Technical
- Track gauge: 4 ft 8 1/2 in (1,435 mm) standard gauge

The Coaster was a passenger train of the Southern Pacific on its coast route between Los Angeles and San Francisco, California. Service began on December 6, 1901, as daylight coach trains number 1 and 2 called the Coast Line Limited. These trains were renumbered 21 and 22 on November 15, 1902, and renamed the Coaster on February 28, 1906. Service was briefly cancelled from June 9 to December 22, 1912. Service was discontinued for a decade in December, 1916. Service resumed when sleeping cars were added to trains renumbered 69 and 70 in April, 1926, and briefly renamed the Oceanshore Express. The name Coaster was again used from September 25, 1927, until the older equipment was replaced with lightweight chair cars running as Starlight trains 94 and 95 on October 2, 1949. Diesel locomotives pulled the Starlight from January 10, 1955, until it was consolidated with the Lark on July 15, 1957.
