= Coast (Scottish band) =

Scottish alternative rock band

Coast were a Scottish alternative rock band active between 1991 and 1999. The band achieved initial success with singles including "Now That You Know Me“.

== Discography ==
=== Singles ===
- Head Light, B-sides: "Soundhole" "Blue Green" 1991
- "Polly's Domain", B-side "Sleepy" 1995
- "Slugs", B-side "Shag Wild" 1995
- "Do It Now", B-side "It's Not Too Late" 1996
- "Now That You Know Me", B-side "Tender Cage 1996

=== Album ===
- Big Jet Rising 1997
