= Expatriate (album) =

Studio album by The Coast
- Released: April 1, 2008 (Canada); February 9, 2009 (UK); May 5, 2009 (US)
- Recorded: Late 2007
- Genre: Indie rock
- Length: 40:11
- Label: Aporia Records; Afternoon Records
- Producer: Chris Stringer

The Coast chronology
The Coast (EP) (2006)	Expatriate (2008)

Professional ratings
Review scores
Source	Rating
AllMusic	4/5 stars
Exclaim! Magazine	positive
Kaffeine Buzz	positive
Little Village Magazine	positive
Soundcheck Magazine	positive

Expatriate is the debut album from Toronto, Ontario, Canada-based indie rock group The Coast. The album was released in Canada on April 1, 2008, and in the UK on February 9, 2009, via Aporia Records. The album was released digitally in the US on August 19, 2008, and was released on CD on May 5, 2009, by Minneapolis-based indie record label Afternoon Records. Expatriate follows the band's critically acclaimed debut self-titled EP from 2006. The album was produced, recorded, and mixed by Chris Stringer in late 2007. "Tightrope" was the first single, released on 7" vinyl in 2008 by Magnificent Sevens, and as a promo single in the UK in early February 2009. The Coast toured the US and Canada extensively after the album's initial release.

In an interview, Ian Fosbery said: "An expatriate is a person who is not from this country and we started to feel like because we're always on the road and we're not always around, we'd come home and it's a really weird feeling, like you feel out of place."

Expatriate was released to generally positive reviews. Soundcheck magazine proclaimed the band "has just penned a gem of an indie pop album that serves as a sparkling expedition into thick, layered pop music that is equal parts Tokyo Police Club simplicity and U2 crescendos," and hailed the band's "dramatic interlacing of densely composed rock and charmingly earnest pop music."

== Track listing ==
All tracks written by The Coast.

1. "Tightrope" – 2:48
2. "Nueva York" – 3:25
3. "The Moon Is Dead" – 4:00
4. "No Secret Why" – 3:20
5. "Song for Gypsy Rose Lee" – 4:07
6. "Floodlights" – 4:23
7. "We're the Ones" – 3:22
8. "Killing Off Our Friends" – 4:23
9. "Ceremony Guns" – 3:36
10. "Play Me the Apostle" – 3:35
11. "All the Boys" – 3:12

== Singles ==
- "Tightrope" (June 24, 2008, 7" vinyl)
  - b/w: "Tightrope" (Tokyo Police Club Remix)

== Personnel ==
- Ben Spurr – vocals, guitars, keyboards
- Ian Fosbery – guitars, keyboards, vocals
- Luke Melchiorre – bass, vocals
- Jordan Melchiorre – drums
- Produced, recorded, and mixed by Chris Stringer.
- Mastered by João Carvalho at João Carvalho Mastering.
- Recorded at Lincoln County Social Club, Halla Music, and The Cereal Loft.
- Additional piano and vocals recorded at Canterbury Sound.
- Trumpet on track 9 by Ben Bowan.
- Kate Rogers – additional vocals on tracks 1, 2, 3, 4, and 8.
- Gavin Gardiner – additional vocals on tracks 1 and 2.
- Alt Altman, Kevin Corlis, Leslie Davies, and Jamie Matechuk – additional vocals on tracks 1 and 8.
- Additional guitars, keyboards, and percussion on all tracks by Chris Stringer.
- Cover art and layout design by Joel Tellier.
- Aporia Records #APCD-029.
