= Coaster (video game) =

1993 video game

- Developer: Code To Go
- Publisher: Walt Disney Computer Software
- Producer: Jim Simmons
- Programmer: Dan Dancall
- Platform: DOS
- Release: 1993
- Genre: Simulation

Coaster is a 1993 video game developed by American studio Code To Go and published by Walt Disney Computer Software for DOS.

== Gameplay ==
Coaster is a simulator which allows players to build rollercoasters. The player can ride pre-made or custom coasters and design new coasters from scratch or existing coasters. After each ride of the coaster, the player is presented with a score. The score is given based on the judgments of six evaluators. Each evaluator has a separate, distinct criterion, which determines score of the coaster. The player can fulfill criteria, leading to a higher score, by designing the coaster towards the evaluators' specific needs. The player can also look at the ride statistics by reviewing the "signature".

== Reception ==
In 1996, Computer Gaming World declared Coaster the 31st-worst computer game ever released.
