= Revol Wireless =

- Type: Private
- Industry: Communications Services
- Founded: 2005
- Defunct: January 16, 2014
- Headquarters: Independence, OH (Corporate headquarters)
- Products: Wireless using CDMA
- Parent: Cleveland Unlimited, Inc.
- Website: revol.com

Revol Wireless was a regional wireless carrier based in Independence, Ohio, United States that offered flat-rate, unlimited talk-time wireless service in some Midwest US markets. The company ceased business January 16, 2014 and sold its wireless licenses to Sprint Corporation.

== History ==
Cleveland Unlimited purchased Northcoast PCS in July 2004 from former owner Cablevision. The original Northcoast name was kept in service until 2005, when the Company relaunched with the Revol brand. The company owned mobile licenses and operated its own towers in the 1900 MHz band several midwest markets. CUI, based in Independence, Ohio, operated in the Cleveland, Ohio, market. Through its subsidiary CSM Wireless, LLC, it also owned spectrum and offered Revol wireless service in Columbus, Canton, Toledo, Sandusky, and Youngstown, Ohio, and Indianapolis, Indiana. Through a joint venture with Leap Wireless, it also owned spectrum in Columbus, Indiana; New Castle, Pennsylvania; and Portland, Oregon.

== Financial troubles and closing ==
In 2007, Revol contracted with Mobile Posse Inc. to place advertising on customers' mobile phone screens, a practice that most American wireless carriers had been reluctant to do, so as to not irritate customers. The practice was more common in Europe and Asia. Customers who downloaded the "Revol Perks" app received a one-time $10 discount on their billing statement.

In September 2011, holders of the company's formerly outstanding Senior Secured Notes assumed full ownership of the company after Revol was unable to make payments on $150 million in debt it had taken on in 2005. In November 2013, Revol announced that it had begun the process of selling its spectrum licenses to Sprint Corporation and that it intended to give its customers 30 days termination notice when the sale is complete.

On December 16, 2013, Revol notified users via text messages and a notice on its website that it would be going out of business and service would be terminated as of January 16, 2014. Users were offered a free phone and month of service if they switched to Boost Mobile at participating stores between December 18 and December 24, 2013.
