= Coastal Television Network =

Coastal Television Network (CTN) was a Tanzanian television network owned by the Africa Media Group, also owner of Channel Ten. It was the first television station to begin operation in mainland Tanzania, months ahead of the IPP-owned ITV and launched as the CNN licensee for the country.

== History ==
CTN started broadcasting at the beginning of February 1994 (March 1994 according to some sources, one source suggests it was registered on 14 February 1994, while another suggests it started broadcasting on 1 March) with its coverage area limited to Dar es Salaam, Morogoro and Zanzibar (the latter of which already had a local television service since 1974) on VHF channel 7 in a 100 km radius. CTN relayed CNN International as an official licensee, though some local programming, limited to local events, also aired.

The Daily News viewed the station as "makeshift" compared to ITV during its first few months on air. The early months were also caused by tensions with its competitors. CTN's director Al Munir Karim was arrested by threatening to kill IPP chairman Reginald Mengi and planned to blow ITV up.

Initially owned by Cablevision (Africa) Group of Companies, eventually CTN started complementing the CNN programming with the EMEA panfeed of Cartoon Network, timeshared with TNT, which was later renamed TNT, as well as MCM Africa, the English service of Deutsche Welle and a package of Hollywood titles from Columbia-Tristar. CTN was already airing movies by August 1994, one such title being Twins, but with its sex scene cut off. Its ultimate goal in 1994 was to produce its own programming and news.

In October 1999, it became a part of the newly-formed Africa Media Group, making it a sister station to Dar es Salaam Television (DTV) and Channel Ten. As of 2003, it had plans to launch a relay station at Mwanza via satellite.

It is unknown when exactly did the station shut down. The 2018 Media Ownership Monitor listed CTN as one of Africa Media Group's four stations, though this information could be outdated.
