= Northcoast PCS =

Northcoast PCS was an Independence, Ohio-based prepaid mobile phone operator owned by Cleveland Unlimited, LLC. It offered no-contract unlimited local calling for a fixed monthly price similar to Cricket Communications in Cleveland. It offered unlimited roaming in Dayton and Toledo for an additional monthly fee by a reciprocal roaming agreement with Cricket Communications signed in December 2004.

Northcoast owned a large amount of PCS licenses over the US that covered about 47 million POPs during the US government's D- E- and F-block PCS auctions. Unfortuantly to cell phone enthusiasts, only the Cleveland license was built out and provided service. At some point in its history, it sold its Canton spectrum. The rest of the licenses not used by Revol were sold to Verizon Wireless.

In 2005, Northcoast would change its name to Revol Wireless and tell its customers it was a new company. This tactic was supposed to calm down Northcoast customers and give the carrier a fresh start. Northcoast PCS and Revol both have one of the highest negative Better Business Bureau ratings in Ohio with over 31 major reports in the last 36 months alone (see source link below.)

== See also ==
- Revol Wireless, successor company to Northcoast PCS.
