= Coastie =

East/West Coasters, as described by Midwest US university students

The term coastie or coasty (more often heard and seen as the plural coasties) is a pejorative term used in Midwestern U.S. universities (especially the University of Wisconsin-Madison) to denote students who come from outside the region, mainly from the East or West Coast.

The term is thought to have been coined in the early to mid 1990s. Coasties are often confused with FIBs (Fucking Illinois Bastards), a term used to describe students from the north shore suburbs of Chicago. Zooniversity Music brought the term into the national spotlight in 2009 with their release of "Coastie Song (What's A Coastie)."

Although the most general use of the term denotes only the origin of these students, there are often implicit or explicit associations that use of the term can evoke. One is that coasties do not pay their own tuition because they come from socioeconomically privileged, and often Jewish families. Other associations include living in private residence halls and membership in a fraternity or a sorority. An additional association is indulgence in fashion.

== See also ==
- Flyover country, a pejorative term for the interior areas of the country between the aforementioned Coasts
- Left Coast, a term referring to the dominance of left-wing politics on the West Coast of the US
- Coastal elite, a pejorative term for residents of coastal states
