= South Coast =

South Coast is a name often given to coastal areas to the south of a geographical region or major metropolitan area.

== Geographical ==
=== Australia ===
- South Coast (New South Wales), the coast of New South Wales, Australia, south of Sydney
- South Coast (Queensland), the historic name of the Gold Coast, Queensland
- South Coast (South Australia), the coast stretching from west of Victor Harbor to the Murray Mouth at Goolwa
- South coast of Western Australia, from Cape Leeuwin to Eucla, Western Australia

=== Canada ===
- Ontario's South Coast, a descriptor used for marketing purposes by Norfolk County, Ontario
- South Coast, British Columbia, a subregion of the British Columbia Coast

=== India ===
- Southern part of Coastal India
  - Coromandel coast, south-eastern India
  - Malabar coast, south-western India

=== Indonesia ===
- South Coast Regency, West Sumatra

=== South Africa ===
- South Coast (KwaZulu-Natal), in the KwaZulu-Natal province
  - Southcoast Mall, a shopping centre in Shelly Beach on the KwaZulu-Natal South Coast
  - South Coast (House of Assembly of South Africa constituency), defunct electoral district

=== United States ===
- Gulf Coast of the United States, also known as the South Coast
- South Coast (California)
  - South Coast AVA, a designated American viticultural Area in Southern California
  - South Coast Plaza, a shopping mall in Costa Mesa, California
- South Coast (Massachusetts), a region of the southeastern Massachusetts coastline, from Wareham to Swansea

== Other uses ==
- South Point Hotel, Casino & Spa, formerly South Coast, a hotel and casino in Las Vegas
- South Coast (album), by Ramblin' Jack Elliott
- "South Coast", a song by The Kingston Trio from ...From the Hungry i
- "South Coast", a song by Throwing Muses from Moonlight Concessions

== See also ==
- Gulf Coast of the United States
