= Barrymore Theatre =

- Eastwood Theater, Cinema Theater
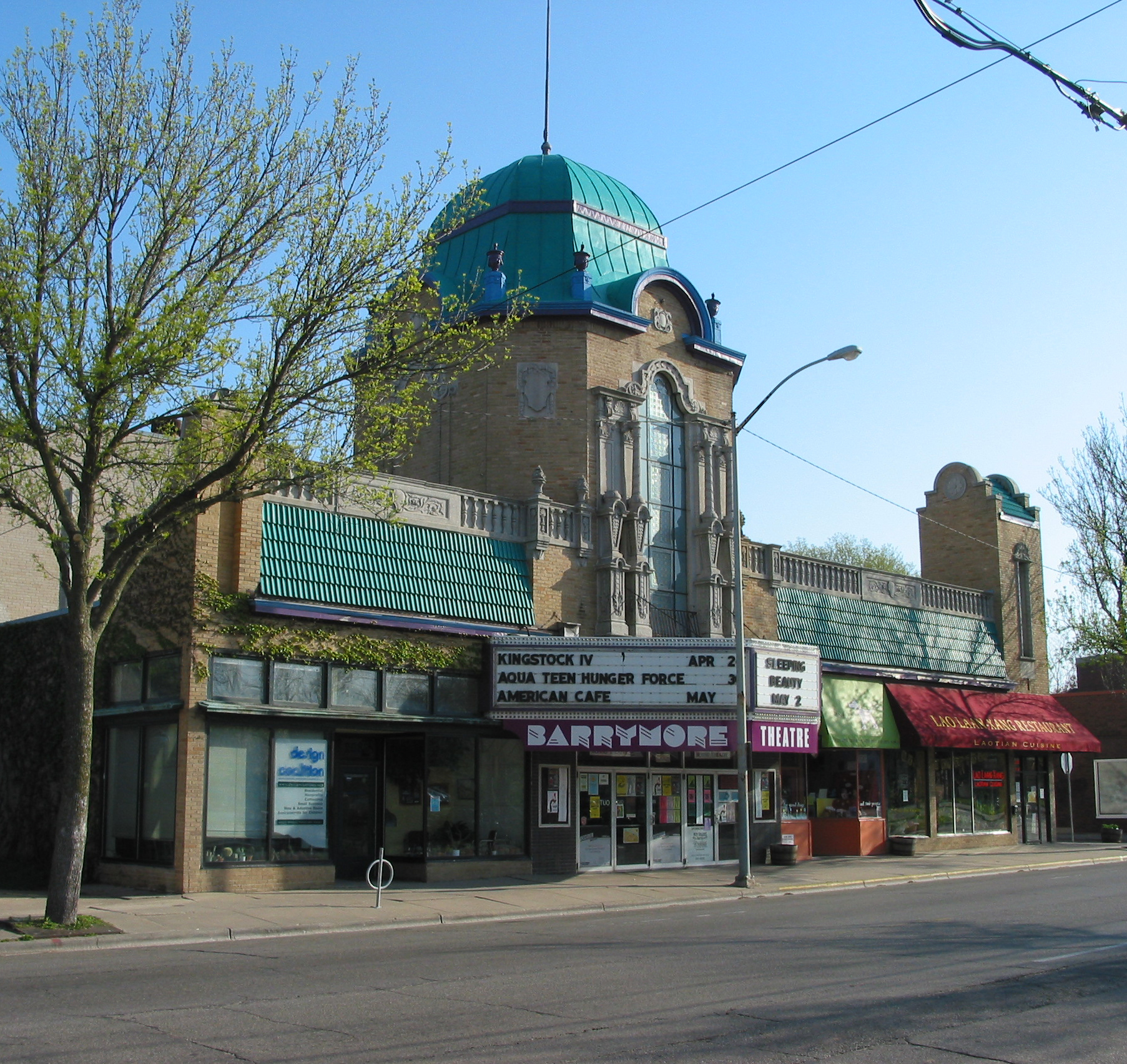
- Barrymore Theatre in 2010
- Interactive map of Barrymore Theatre
- Address: 2090 Atwood Avenue; Madison, Wisconsin; United States
- Coordinates: 43.0927°N 89.3521°W
- Owner: Schenk Atwood Revitalization Association (SARA)
- Capacity: 971
- Current use: live concert venue

Construction
- Built: 1929
- Opened: December 27, 1929
- Years active: 89
- Architects: Frederic J. Klein and H.C. Alford

Website
- barrymorelive.com

The Barrymore Theatre is a 971-capacity live music venue on the east side of Madison, Wisconsin. Originally built as the Eastwood Theater in 1929, the Barrymore was founded by Richard "Sich" Slone and Tom Peterson in 1987 in an attempt to revive Madison's declining Schenk-Atwood neighborhood. The theater has hosted almost 3,000 shows and events including rock concerts, films, plays, dance recitals, broadcasts, political rallies, children's programming, and community events. Today the Barrymore is owned by the Atwood-Barrymore Corporation with Jared Duymovic as general manager. It is an independent, community-based theater, owned by a nonprofit corporation.

== History ==
=== Eastwood Theater (1929–1967) ===
The building of a large east side theater was first announced in January 1924 after the purchase of the Gottlieb Maisch property at 2090 Atwood Avenue. The site had been the location of eastside fall festivals since 1922. The project was initiated in part by E. M. Michalson, who owned the Palace Theater on nearby Winnebago St. Promising a stage for local groups to use, the theater gained the support of members of the East Side Business Men's Association, who later formed the Eastwood Theater Company in October 1928. Capitalized at $50,000, the corporation had 125 stockholders with banker Herman J. Loftsgordon as president. Ground was broken by Loftsgordon on April 30, 1929.

Designed by architects Frederic J. Klein and H. C. Alford, the exterior octagonal dome was done in an Italian Renaissance style while the auditorium was designed in a Spanish colonial style with tile-roofed arches running along the walls. Twinkling star lights were put in the ceiling and a lighting effect projected clouds passing overhead. The theater had a capacity of 980, with 225 of those seats being in the balcony. Using local contractors, Vogel Brothers Construction saw to the installation of modern innovations in acoustics and fireproofing. The first theater in Wisconsin designed specifically for sound motion pictures, the Eastwood featured a $15,000 Western Electric Vitaphone system. The cost of the entire project neared $250,000. The first manager was A. P. Desormeaux, formerly of the downtown Strand Theater.

The Eastwood opened on Friday, December 27, 1929. At the theater's dedication Madison Mayor Albert G. Schmedeman said "This building is absolutely essential to the progress of the east side." WIBA radio organist Dave Welton performed on a Kilgen theatre organ "opus 4420," size 2/8, before the program, which featured the all-talking Mack Sennett comedy Midnight Daddies. Two nights later the Eastwood held a midnight screening on New Year's Eve. A month later they were hosting a county play competition to a packed house.

Despite the Eastwood's initial success in the wake of the stock market crash of 1929, the theater building corporation struggled with debt after the project had gone $40,000 over budget. In 1930 local builders Vogel Brothers took out a $55,000 lien against the theater, taking over the building April 1931. After the resignation of Desormeaux, the Eastwood was leased to a succession of managers over the next 15 years. Desormeaux later said matinees were out of the question for a neighborhood theater like the Eastwood, and that rent was "impossible."

The Eastwood primarily screened double features of second-run films in addition to special features and live events. In the early 1930s organ recitals were broadcast live daily over WIBA, and the appearances by country music stars popularized on Chicago's WLS radio drew crowds. There were also occasional vaudeville performances, including an appearance by the conjoined Godino Brothers in 1932. Air conditioning was installed in 1938. As World War II loomed, "four-minute men" gave short speeches between features in favor of war preparedness. In December 1943 defense workers from the nearby Ray-O-Vac and Gisholt Machinery Company plants were the first in the country to see a "War Department Report" propaganda film designed to tamp down optimism by taking a candid view of the war.

The Eastwood was sold in 1946 to Carl Lunenschloss and Walter Brucken, who owned the Avalon Theater in Platteville, WI. In 1948 the theater was remodeled and added to Standard Theaters, a Milwaukee chain that owned 25 other theaters in nine Wisconsin cities. At the same time the Eastwood became the temporary home of Trinity Lutheran Church as their Winnebago Street home was being rebuilt. Sunday, Christmas and Easter services were delivered from the Eastwood stage for over three years. The theater also experienced episodes of juvenile delinquency, with an Eastwood parking attendant being awarded "special police powers" to deal with "difficulties" in the theater's rear parking lot. Gisholt Machinery workers held union votes at the theater, and the Madison PTA sponsored many children's film series and cartoons.

In 1965 the Madison Theater Guild doubted that a civic auditorium planned downtown would be sufficient for their needs, and urged the city to buy the Eastwood Theater for $160,000 and remodel it for $100,000. The Guild later reconsidered.

=== Cinema Theater (1967–1987) ===
In 1966 Milwaukee theater chain 20th Century Theaters opened the Hilldale Theater on Madison's west side. The Hilldale was quite successful with its screenings of art house and foreign films, and the next year 20th Century sought to repeat that formula with the purchase of the Eastwood Theater in 1967, having leased it previously. Beginning in October 1967 the interior was extensively remodeled, with the octagonal tower sealed off with a drop ceiling and the auditorium gutted of its Spanish tiled porticos. The number of seats was reduced by 200 to 825. The lobby was paneled and carpeted, mod lighting fixtures were installed plus a modern vending stand. Renamed the Cinema Theater, it opened on December 20, 1967 with Madison Mayor Otto Festge in attendance. The theater debuted with an extended run of director John Huston's The Bible. The Cinema showed art house fare like 2001: A Space Odyssey and Midnight Cowboy while also trying to retain special features for children. The theater began to show more mainstream movies in the 1970s, along with second-run films cast off from 20th Century's downtown theaters. The theater also began to show pornographic movies in the early 1970s. Frequently alternating with children's features, the theater later showed X-rated movies exclusively in the early 1980s.

=== Barrymore Theatre (1987–1996) ===
By the 1980s, the Schenk-Atwood area had declined since its heyday as one of Madison's first suburban shopping areas. In the 1970s a commuter bypass was installed and shopping malls opened on the outskirts of the city. Many Schenk's Corners stores had closed, and crime was on the upswing. The Cinema Theater itself was held up in 1982.

In 1986, Richard Slone and Tom Petersen began fundraising in the community with the goal of purchasing the theater, refurbishing it, and converting it to an arthouse movie theater that would also host live music, theater productions and community events. The X-rated movie titles on the Cinema marquee had hindered any neighborhood redevelopment, and Slone and Petersen were able to find many backers who wanted to revive the area, including Trinity Lutheran Church and the CEO of Madison Kipp Corporation, Reed Coleman. Another early investor was future (now current) general manager of the Barrymore, Steve Sperling. Once the theater (plus its three attached storefronts) was bought for $150,000 and renovated for $100,000 more, the Barrymore Theatre (named after the famous acting family) opened on July 10, 1987.

As a one-screen moviehouse that competed with other theaters for Madison's sophisticated film-goers, the Barrymore began losing money immediately, and soon converted to a $2 budget cinema. As a music venue, however, it began to find its audience with a lineup of diverse acts, including rock, folk, world beat and women's music acts. In 1988 the theater acquired a license to sell beer and wine, and a new restaurant tenant opened in the theater's corner storefront the next year. Petersen having left the enterprise, Slone struggled to pay the bills while running a money-losing business. In order to meet a crucial bank payment, the theater launched a successful "Give a Buck" campaign in 1990, but the debt still remained. Yet the goal of reviving the neighborhood was starting to succeed with the opening of new restaurants and bars.

In 1992 the theater was bought by the nonprofit Schenk Atwood Revitalization Association, a group formed in 1979 as an offshoot of the East Side Businessman's Association. The new Barrymore board adopted a practice of no longer screening feature films. The theater also stopped bidding against local promoters for touring acts and instead concentrated on renting the house to others. They also hired a new general manager, Sherri Wilder, who had previously been house manager. With the 800-seat auditorium being the right size for many of the bands touring at the time, the Barrymore began to turn a profit for the first time. With the departure of Wilder in 1996, Steve Sperling was hired as general manager.
