= The Coast (band) =

Canadian indie rock band

- Origin: Toronto, Ontario, Canada
- Genres: Indie rock
- Years active: 2004–2010
- Labels: Aporia Records
- Past members: Benjamin Spurr; Ian Fosbery; Luke Melchiorre; Jordan Melchiorre

The Coast was a Canadian indie rock group, based in Toronto, Ontario. The Coast was Ben Spurr (vocals, guitar, keyboards), Ian Fosbery (guitar, keyboards, vocals), and brothers Luke Melchiorre (bass, vocals) and Jordan Melchiorre (drums).

== History ==
The band was originally named The July 26th Movement, and released an EP titled Take a Walk Outside in July 2004. The band opted to change their name to The Coast, after the Paul Simon song of the same name (found on Simon's album The Rhythm of the Saints). The band's original influences included bands such as The Verve, New Order, and The Smiths, but in recent years their interests have become more influenced by their contemporaries.

The Coast released their self-titled EP in Canada in March 2006, and in the US in May 2007. The Coast has shared the stage with the likes of Elbow, The French Kicks, Tokyo Police Club (who also provided a remix of The Coast's song "Tightrope" in 2008), Born Ruffians, Islands, The Duke Spirit, Ra Ra Riot, The Virgins, and Chairlift. The band was touted as one of the acts to watch in 2008 by Canada's national music monthly Exclaim! and Toronto's Eye Weekly. The band signed to Aporia Records in late 2007 and recorded their debut full-length album Expatriate. The album was released on April 1, 2008, in Canada, on August 19, 2008, in the US (digitally), February 2, 2009, in the UK, and May 5, 2009, on CD in the US by their new Minneapolis-based label Afternoon Records. Nationwide tours of Canada and the US followed.

In early 2009, the band did their last tour of the UK and then started their hiatus to take a break from their year and a half of touring. The Coast's guitarist, Ian Fosbery, also spent this time finishing his university degree–and their bassist, Luke Melchiorre, began work towards his Masters.

During 2009, the Coast also spent every spare moment locked away in their rehearsal space writing and working on new material. In November 2009, they once again entered the Lincoln County Social Club, the same studio in which they recorded Expatriate, with 14 new tracks–the most they've ever tried to record. The album was once again produced with long-time friend and producer Chris Stringer (We're Marching On, Ohbijou, Rush). The 9-track record, entitled Queen Cities, was released in September 2010 by Aporia. Later that year the group announced that they would be disbanding. The Coast played their final show together on December 29, 2010.

== Discography ==
=== Albums ===
- Expatriate (April 1, 2008, Aporia Records)
- Queen Cities (September 21, 2010, Aporia Records)

=== Singles & EPs ===
- The Coast (EP) (March 7, 2006, self-released/Aporia Records)
- "Tightrope" b/w "Tightrope" (Tokyo Police Club Remix) single (June 24, 2008, Magnificent Sevens Records)

== See also ==
- Music of Canada
- Canadian rock
- List of bands from Canada
- List of Canadian musicians
- Category:Canadian musical groups
