= Ohio State University Athletic Band =

American college athletic band

The Ohio State University Athletic Band
- School: Ohio State University
- Location: Columbus, Ohio
- Conference: Big Ten
- Founded: 1929 (Regimental Bands), 1947 (Activities Band), 1994 (Athletic Band), 1996 (Fall Quarter Athletic Band)
- Director: Dr. Christopher Hoch
- Assistant Director: Josh Reynolds
- Members: ~220 (varies by semester)
- Fight song: "Across the Field, Buckeye Battle Cry"
- Website: http://tbdbitl.osu.edu/athletic-band

The Ohio State University Athletic Band is a non-audition band for any student, faculty, or staff of Ohio State University with prior instrumental experience. Many students who perform in the Athletic Band also perform in the Ohio State University Marching Band. Each Athletic Band features full contemporary concert band instrumentation, including woodwinds. It performs throughout the year at various athletic and goodwill functions across campus. Members of the Athletic Band receive course credit for their band participation.

== History ==
=== Military band ===
Military training was an important part of the early curriculum at Ohio State, and a band was formed to provide music for the cadets to drill to. The first appearance of a marching band was in 1878, as a 12 piece fife and drum corps. The first marching band in 1878 was sponsored by the Military Department at OSU, and continued to perform for military functions until 1881, when a missing mouthpiece incident led to the student director's expulsion from the university, and the Military Department refusing to sponsor a program. Various student-led bands with no university faculty were formed and performed through 1896. In 1896, the Military Department decided to once again sponsor a band, hiring Gustav Bruder as their director. Under Bruder, and later Eugene J. Weigel, the band grew in size to a block of 64, and later 100 bandsmen. They also began playing and marching for most military and athletic events.

By 1929, the Marching Band, which Weigel limited to an even 100 musicians, was composed mostly of upperclass ROTC cadets. This caused many of the freshman and sophomore students to be unable to march. Weigel, in his desire to create a more well-rounded music program at the university, created two Regimental Bands to complement the Marching Band. These bands, known as the Infantry Regimental Band and the Artillery Regimental Band, helped to train new students in the marching style of the Marching Band. These bands met primarily in the Winter and Spring Quarters, and were often complemented by the upperclass members of the Marching Band, looking to continue to improve their marching and musicianship. In 1934, Weigel removed all woodwind instruments from the marching band (flutes, clarinets, saxophones, etc.) The only exception to this was during World War II. From 1943 to 1945, director William McBride allowed woodwinds, vocalists, young, old, and even citizens of the campus community to wear the uniform and perform at home football games. The Regimental Bands continued to complement the Marching Band throughout the 1940s and 1950s.

In 1952, the ROTC department, by directive of the Department of Defense, had to sever ties with the Marching Band program. This allowed the general membership of Ohio State University to try out and become members of the Marching Band. The Regimental Bands, which were combined into one Military Band, continued to perform during the Winter and Spring, and were conducted by the Band Staff of the Marching Band. Under director Charles Spohn, the Military Band became an ensemble that was highly respected. In 1970, the Military Band recorded the album Adjutant's Call. The Military Band was eventually merged with the Buckeye Scarlet and Gray bands.

=== Athletic band ===
In 1947, Jack O. Evans created the first Activities Band on campus. The Activities Band, from inception, allowed both men and women. This band performed at concerts, men's basketball games and some pep rally events across campus. In 1956, the band's name was changed to the Buckeye Band. Enrollment in the Buckeye Band was open to students who played any concert band instrument, unlike the Marching Band which was limited to brass and percussion only. In the late 1950s, with membership passing 130 members, the Buckeye Band was split into two bands: Buckeye Scarlet and Buckeye Gray. These bands were run separately from the Marching and Military Bands until 1979. In 1980, the Military band took over the performance of Basketball games from the Buckeye Bands. The Buckeye Bands became concert bands solely, taking on the names "University Band" and "Symphonic Band." The new Military Band performed at men's and women's basketball games, the spring football Game, ROTC parades, other campus events, and concerts throughout the city. The Military Band continued to also be a source of training for prospective members of the Marching Band, as well as an ensemble for veteran Marching Band members to stay in shape with. By 1980, the Military Band's uniforms were replaced for men's basketball games. The band started wearing gray slacks and white shirts with a red vest for these games. The military style uniforms continued to be used for concerts, parades, and the Spring Football Game. The Military Band met twice a week, and once the spring football game was over, the remainder of the year was typically spent teaching more advanced marching fundamentals used by the Marching Band.

As the Military Band began performing at men's and women's basketball, various different uniforms were experimented with for these athletic events, including scarlet and gray striped Waldo sweaters, jerseys, and T-shirts. The Men's Basketball Band was an auditioned band, while the bands that performed at other events were open enrollment. In 1988, the Marching Band received funds for new uniforms. Dr. Jon Woods kept the old Marching Band uniforms for use by the Military Band. These uniforms were used by the Military Band until the 1992 spring football game. After that game, it was decided to retire the military uniforms and standardize the Spring Military Band with red polo shirts and gray pants. In 1994, Dr. Jon Woods decided to retire the name "Military Band", since the band typically performed at only one ROTC event, and did not wear any type of military uniform. The program was restarted in the autumn of 1994 as the Athletic Band. The Athletic Band continued to perform at the same functions as the Military Band did during Winter and Spring Quarters.

In the autumn quarter of 1996, Dr. Jon Woods was approached by the OSU Athletic Department to form a Fall Quarter Athletic Band. This band would perform at women's volleyball games during the autumn and then perform at pre-season men's basketball and ice hockey games. The first Volleyball Band at OSU premiered with 14 students, one of whom was the conductor. The band continued to experiment with various uniforms, including track suits, T-shirts, and polos. As enrollment increased, the Athletic Band would be split into evenly orchestrated smaller bands, which rehearsed together and occasionally performed as a full ensemble. In the early 21st century, with declining enrollment, the Winter Athletic Band ended auditions for the Men's Basketball Band, and rather split up the total enrollment of the band into smaller bands of relatively equal instrumentation. In 2006, the Band Staff launched what it called the "Total Band Program". This program emphasized the importance of the Athletic Band alongside the Marching Band. The Marching Band would host an event every spring known as Junior & Senior Night, which invited high school students to tour the Marching Band facilities and perform with the Marching Band in a concert at the end of the day. High school students would be given a tour in small groups by Squad Leaders and other members of the Marching Band. This event was opened to Athletic Band in 2006, and Junior & Senior Night was opened to all students who played any band instrument. Students who play woodwinds would be given tours and information by section leaders of their respective sections in Athletic Band. The Band Staff also decided to remove Fall, Winter, and Spring, from the Athletic Band name, allowing for one continuous band through the year. A new logo, a crest of similar design to the Marching Band crest, was commissioned, and embroidered on new polo shirts. These efforts by the Band Staff have helped to bolster enrollment in the fall quarter, as well as continue to provide for a very robust winter and spring quarter band.

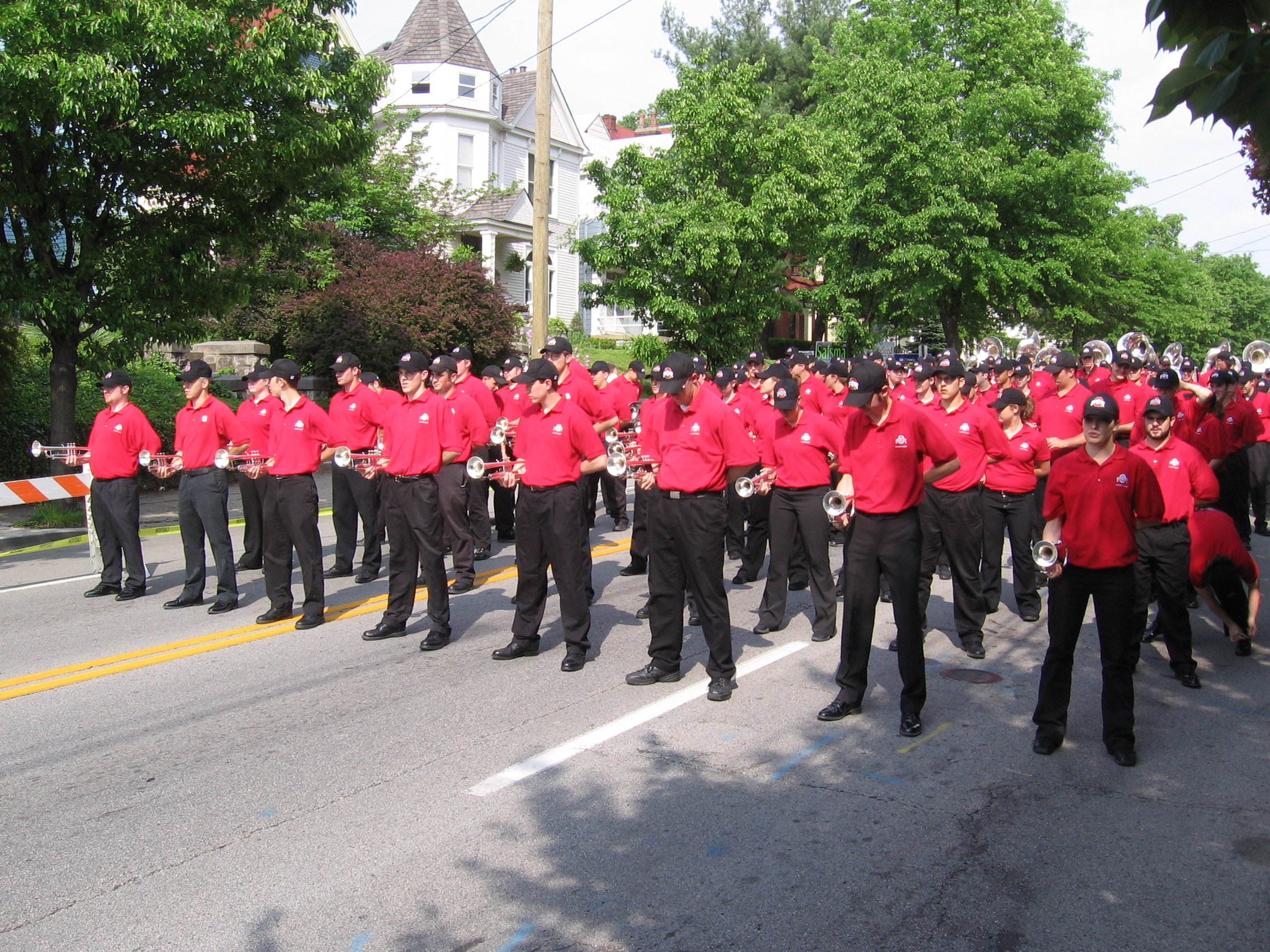
The 2006 Spring Athletic Band marching in the Kentucky Derby Parade.

Beginning in 2011, the athletic department requested that the Men's Basketball Band did not total more than 57 musicians, to maximize the number of seats for spectators. This arrangement made the Band Staff determine in the fall of 2012 that the Men's Basketball Band should once again be an audition band, to allow for the best musicians to perform at those games.

In 2012, Ohio State transitioned from quarters to semesters, allowing for only Fall and Spring Bands. The Fall Band began rehearsing twice a week (Fall Band used to rehearse once a week only), and with more emphasis on musicianship, memorization, and choreography, the Athletic Band program has continued to evolve into a highly energetic program that complements the Marching Band throughout the year. The Athletic Band performs at men's and women's basketball, men's and women's volleyball, men's and women's ice hockey, men's soccer, wrestling, the spring football game, an ROTC Pass-In-Review, as well as an annual concert on campus. Typically the Fall Band program numbers around 200 musicians, with the Spring Band often totaling more than 300.

The school fight songs—"Buckeye Battle Cry" and "Fight the Team Across the Field"—were first performed by the Marching Band in the early 20th century. Other traditional songs performed by the band are the 1960s pop hit "Hang on Sloopy" and the famous "We Don't Give a Damn for the Whole State of Michigan", which was popularized by James Thurber in the Broadway production of The Male Animal. Several other popular charts include Al Jarreau's "Boogie Down", the Michael Stanley Band's "My Town", Royal Crown Revue's "Hey, Pachuco!" and recent hits such as Adele's "Rolling in the Deep" and Bruno Mars' "Locked Out of Heaven". The Athletic Band performs music of many different styles and genres, which allows for a variety of music to be played at performances, and also allows expansion of the musicianship of the performers in the ensemble.

== Composition ==
Every September, the Marching Band holds tryouts. Roughly 400 or more people try out for the Marching Band's 228 positions. As such, a significant number of musicians are cut. The Band Staff offers all of those cut the opportunity to return to the Band Center the following week to play through various School Songs and popular music pieces. Many students who have committed to moving in early, as well as Columbus-local students, return for these pre school year rehearsals. Marching Band candidates make up a significant proportion of the brass and percussion sections of the Athletic Band. Many students who do not make the Marching Band their first or second year improve their marching and musicianship via the Athletic Band and subsequently make the Marching Band. Many students who tried out for the Marching Band and subsequently join Athletic Band find the atmosphere more to their preference, and stay with Athletic Band. Other students, including most woodwind players, join Athletic Band because of the atmosphere, schedule, and performance opportunities.

The Athletic Band is a non-audition band, meaning any student with previous music experience is allowed to join. In sections such as the Trumpets and Trombones, part placement hearings are held. These do not deny a person the ability to perform, however, it will denote which part they play for that Semester, such as Trumpet 1, 2, or 3, or Trombone 1, 2, or 3. These hearings consist of scales, range exercises, and reading the School Songs. Marching Band members who also play in Athletic Band will often play the same instrument in both, though exceptions have happened in the past. Because of this, some instruments read music that would normally be out of range, such as the E♭ Cornet, which often plays Alto Saxophone parts an octave higher. Members of the Athletic Band who have not previously been in the Marching Band are eligible to play E♭ Cornet, Flugelhorn, and Bass Trombone on an individual basis. Typically, Flugelhorns play the 3rd trumpet part, while Bass Trombones may play either specifically written for Bass Trombone, or the lowest trombone part.

The band consists of the following instrumentation:

- E♭ Cornets
- B♭ Trumpets
- B♭ Flugelhorns
- F Mellophones
- B♭ Trombones
- B♭ Bass Trombones
- B♭ Baritones
- B♭ Sousaphones
- C Piccolos
- C Flutes
- B♭ Clarinets
- E♭ Alto Saxophones
- B♭ Tenor Saxophones (occasionally)
- E♭ Baritone Saxophones (occasionally)
- Snare Drums
- Tenor Drums
- Bass Drums
- Cymbals
- Bass Guitar

On occasion, other instruments may show up playing on parts in their natural range. Some instruments that have been in Athletic Band include Oboes, Bassoons, concert Tubas, and Marching Brass not normally associated with the Marching Band. For Spring Athletic Band, the band is broken down into a block band for the field performances at the Spring Football Game. The instrumentation of the Spring Band is not modified to fit the block, rather the block is modified to accommodate the number of musicians.

For purposes of band quality, and because of a limited number of seats at various athletic events, the band is divided as evenly as possible into two larger bands called Scarlet and Gray, which each compose of one half of the band, as well as numerous other bands, labeled A, B, and C (sometimes even D, E, F, etc.), which are all divided as evenly as possible. The smallest bands typically perform at Women's Basketball and Volleyball Games, so the greatest number of tickets can be available for the numerous fans.

The Athletic Band is unique in that there is no limit to the number of Semesters one may spend in the program. The Marching Band only allows for 5 years and completions of the course curriculum, unless there are extenuating circumstances. A student may petition for a sixth year, but unless a year could not be completed for reasons beyond their control: i.e. death in the family, military service, etc. it is rare and almost impossible to be granted a sixth year. Athletic Band has a credit maximum as well. The Band Staff does not limit Athletic Band members to the credit maximum though. Many students choose to take Athletic Band as an audited course (receiving credit hours but no grade), or as an Independent Study course under one of the Band Staff. As such, some students through the years have accumulated 20+ quarters and semesters of seniority in the program (the average four year college student would spend 12 quarters or 8 semesters in the program). Because of the nature of the program, it is also open to PSEOP students (high school juniors and seniors taking college courses on campus), graduate and doctorate level students, the Office of Continuing Education's Senior Program (persons 60+ years of age who qualify for free non-credit courses at OSU), as well as OSU Faculty and Staff. Some musicians who regularly perform with the band have 25 or more academic terms of seniority.

The purpose of seniority within the Athletic Band is to select members for tournament trips. NCAA rules set the limit of musicians at any tournament game at 30: 29 musicians plus a director. All of the instruments are represented except bass guitar, electric guitar, crash cymbals, and tenor drums. Out of the rest of the Athletic Band, those with the highest seniority per section are invited to play for the Women's Basketball tournament, directed by Dr. Chris Hoch. Those who do not make that group are invited to perform for the Men's Hockey tournament, directed by one of the graduate assistants. Seniority also assists in picking section leaders, primarily for Spring Band, when the Athletic Band performs a full pre-game and halftime show. Often one member of Athletic Band will be the "head" squad leader and a member with less seniority, but performs with both the Marching and Athletic Bands, will be "assistant" squad leader, helping mainly with marching and attendance.

=== Student staff ===
As well as the 200–300 marching and playing members of the band, there are 14 additional student staff members who do not march. The student staff is responsible for the day-to-day happenings on the student level of the band. There are two head staff members who oversee the student staff. These staff members also work for the Marching Band during the Fall. The 14-member student staff consists of:

- Head secretary, two assistant secretaries and one librarian/secretary
- Head manager, who oversees two uniform managers, one seamstress, two instrument managers, two record fund managers, and two A/V technicians.

All staff members wear the Athletic Band uniform and work throughout the entire school year in the band offices. The student staff is in charge of holding director ladders for stability during field performances. Extra staff members not holding ladders stand along the sidelines to scan the field for wayward hats, mouthpieces, or tuning slides that may fall off during a performance.

=== Section Leaders/Athletic Band Advisory Council (ABAC) Representatives ===
Originally started in 2019 Autumn Semester. ABAC contains members selected from each section to represent their respective section. These members are the section leaders. There is at least one member at large who is not a section leader, but regardless has a position on ABAC.

== Traditions ==
Each fall, the Athletic Band is invited to perform at the Homecoming Skull Session with the Marching Band. This showcases the many talented musicians that make up both the Marching and Athletic Bands. The Athletic Band arrives at St. John Arena well before the Marching Band, and plays several pieces for the fans in attendance. Typically, an Ohio high school marching band is also present for these Skull Sessions, and the Athletic Band trades off performances with this high school band. Performances of School Songs and associated traditions show off the common bonds that both bands share, while the diverse selection of music that the Athletic Band plays shows off the differences from the Marching Band. While the Marching Band is required to memorize all show and stand music, and the Athletic Band is not, the Athletic Band will typically play a far greater range of musical genres during an event than the Marching Band does at a typical football game.

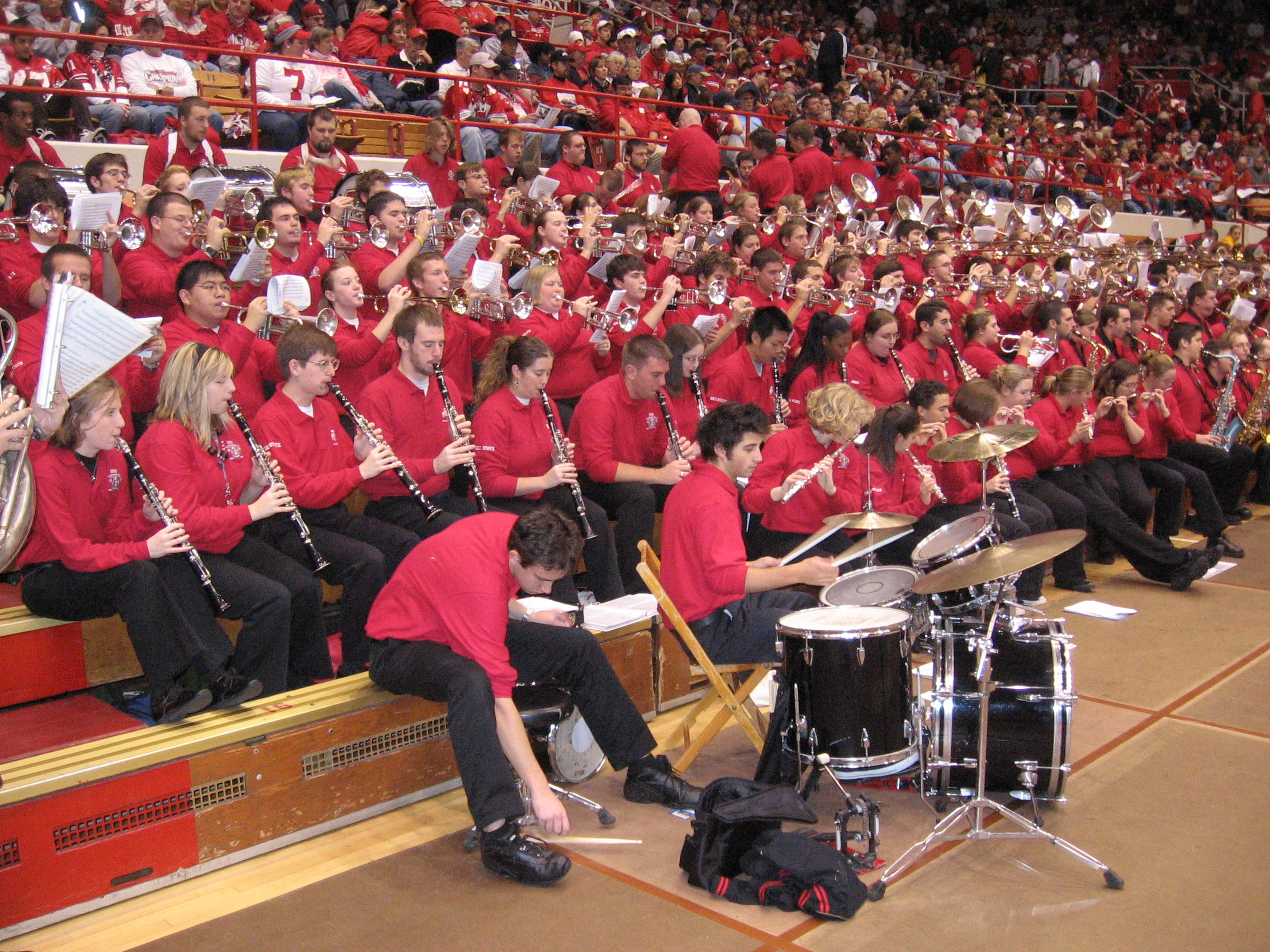
The 2006 Fall Athletic Band performs at the Homecoming Marching Band Skull Session. The varied instrumentation of the Athletic Band is seen clearly.

=== Script On Ice ===
Script Ohio was first performed by The Ohio State University Marching Band on October 24, 1936, at the Ohio State versus University of Pittsburgh football game. According to The Ohio State University Library, a similar floating formation was first performed during the 1932 season by the University of Michigan Marching band; however, it was a set-piece, instead of being formed in a follow-the-leader style drill.

The Script Ohio is the most identifiable trademark associated The Ohio State University Marching and Athletic Bands. It was devised by band director Eugene J. Weigel, who based the looped "Ohio" script design on the marquee sign of the Loew's Ohio Theatre in downtown Columbus.

In the early 2000s (decade), the Athletic Band directing staff, as well as the Athletic Department, realized the wild popularity of the Script Ohio. Having been performed at professional football games, a World Series game, and on the deck of the USS Enterprise, the Athletic Dept wanted to bring this longstanding tradition to new audiences, and asked the Band Staff if it would be possible to create a Script Ohio on an ice rink. The directing staff decided to try it, and an instant hit was created. Members of the Athletic Band put on ice cleats strapped march on the ice between periods of Men's Hockey games, typically a Friday night OSU vs. Michigan or Michigan State hockey game. Because of the dangers of marching on ice, the Script on Ice was highly modified from the Marching Band's counterpart. The full Athletic Band, led by one of the Marching Band's Drum Majors, marches out onto the ice through the visiting team tunnel, at a tempo much slower than the Marching Band's 180 beats per minute. The band turns and faces the home and visitor sides of the arena, playing Buckeye Battle Cry. After a drum roll-off, the band begins playing a shortened version of Le Regiment de Sambre et Meuse. Every 32 counts, a section of the block band breaks formation and marches into the shape of the letters in the trademark Script Ohio.

The Script on Ice is completed with the traditional dotting of the "i." Traditionally, the "Ice Dot" is reserved for Sousaphone players who have never been in the Sousaphone section of the Marching Band. The rules for an Ice Dot are somewhat relaxed compared to the Marching Band rules. In the Marching Band, dotting the i is an honor reserved only to fourth and fifth year members of the Sousaphone section. Because of this, all fourth years are guaranteed one dot, but quite often they may do multiple dots their fourth and fifth years. In Athletic Band, the Ice Dot eligibility is based on seniority. Once a student dots the ice, they are no longer eligible to dot. This routinely allows for students who may only be in their second or third year of Athletic Band to have an Ice Dot. The Ice Dot tradition varies on the abilities of the individual Sousaphone player: some Sousaphone players attempt to strut, some do the traditional bow, most play the solo during the sung portion of Buckeye Battle Cry, however, all Ice Dotters are led to the place of honor by the Drum Major.

After the completion of Script on Ice, the band stands in place and performs a short version of Hang On, Sloopy! and then plays the traditional marching cadence of both the Marching and Athletic Bands, and marches off the ice.

As the title of this section suggests, the Athletic Band does not stop at performing Script Ohio at hockey games. Script Ohio's have been performed at many other events, including in the bottom of the unfilled, Olympic size swimming pool at Ohio State's McCorkle Aquatic Pavilion prior to opening. In 2007, Athletics asked if the band would be willing to perform a Script Ohio on the Basketball court at the OSU vs. Wisconsin Men's Basketball game. Because of the limitations of the court, not as many students could participate, but it was wildly popular, and has been a tradition performed at both Men's and Women's Basketball games.

In 2012, the Athletic Band performed Script on Ice at the OSU vs. Michigan hockey game held at Progressive Field in Cleveland.

=== St. John Pep Rally ===
Before the Spring Football Game, the Athletic Band performs a concert of their pre-game and halftime music on the grassy knoll outside of St. John Arena. This pep rally is not only designed to pump up fans of Ohio State Athletics, it also functions as a last-minute music rehearsal for the Athletic Band, much in the same fashion that the Skull Session operates for football games and the Marching Band. In 2008, Athletics started adding a Men's Lacrosse game before the Spring Game as a chance to break an NCAA attendance record. While there are not too many opportunities for a band to perform during a lacrosse game, the directors decided to split the band in half. Half of the band would perform a Pep Rally during the first half of the lacrosse game, and the other half during the second half of the game. Because of the decision to add a lacrosse game directly before the Spring Game, it was decided to add a pre-game and halftime show to the lacrosse game as well. The first lacrosse game played at Ohio Stadium to include a pre-game and halftime show was in 2008 when OSU hosted the U.S. Air Force Academy.

=== Spring Football Game ===
The Spring Football Game has been an Ohio State tradition for many years. This pits the football team against itself as a type of public practice, which also gets fans pumped up for the upcoming football season. Since the days of the Military Band, there has been a band to perform a halftime show for the fans. Every year, students studying Marching Band Technique at OSU are given the chance to help write the drill for the pre-game and halftime shows performed by the Athletic Band. Students are often given the chance to arrange music for the halftime show as well. Since 2008, the Athletic Band has performed their pre-game and halftime shows twice: one time each for the lacrosse game, and one time each for the football game immediately following. Both the pre-game and halftime shows require full music memorization, which is checked by section leaders and directing staff. Drill charts for the Athletic Band often are extensively modified on-the-fly since performer numbers are not set. One Spring may have 250 people, and the following year may have 350. Often the drill is simpler than that of the Marching Band, allowing for the fact the rehearsal schedule is only twice a week, as opposed to the Marching Band, which rehearses daily. Musical selections have included Latin, Broadway, Heavy Metal, Big Band, etc. The Athletic Band's show music is as varied as the Marching Band's.

=== Cedar Point and Spring Trips ===
Each year, the Athletic Band is the featured guest of Cedar Point Amusement Park in Sandusky, Ohio. The Athletic Band performs the opening ceremonies for the first day of the regular season at the amusement park. They are then invited to enjoy the park for a few hours before another mid-day performance, and then the remainder of the afternoon for fun and entertainment. In past years, the band has performed at Cleveland Indians games, the West Virginia Strawberry Festival in Buckhannon, WV, the Indianapolis 500 Parade, and the Kentucky Derby Parade. These performances are typically in the spring, when the Marching Band is no longer rehearsing, leaving the Athletic Band as ambassadors of the university around Ohio and neighboring states.

=== "The Hockey Song" by Jughead ===
During every Ohio State men's hockey home game, the song "The Hockey Song" by Jughead (not to be confused with the more well-known song of the same name by Stompin' Tom Connors), is played during the Second Intermission, and members of the band do a traditional dance to the song. The song tells the story of a Canadian man who goes to various places around the world and is always asked the same two questions: "Where are you from?" to which the first-person narrator responds, "Yeah I'm from Canada." and, "If you're from Canada, do you play Hockey?" after which the narrator starts listing various types of hockey.
