= Jon Waters =

American marching band director

Jonathan N. Waters (born June 7, 1976) is an American marching band director. He is the Assistant Teaching Professor of Athletic Bands and Music Education at Bowling Green State University where he serves as Head Director of the Falcon Marching Band. Previously, he was Assistant Professor of Music Education and Director of Bands at Heidelberg University, Ohio. He previously taught at Ohio State University (OSU) where he served as Director of Marching and Athletic Bands. He was fired from OSU in 2014 after an investigation found that he failed to address a sexualized culture within the band. Some alumni of the marching band have disputed these claims. Waters sued OSU for defamation; the lawsuit was later dismissed.

== Biography ==
=== Early years ===
Waters was born in Toledo, Ohio in 1976 and moved to Elmore, Ohio in 1984. He was a guitar and saxophone player in eighth grade, when he saw The Ohio State University Marching Band on television with his father, and decided he would one day dot the "i" in the Script Ohio. His middle school music teacher told him that if he wanted to be in the Ohio State Band he needed to choose another instrument because there were no saxophones in the band. He then switched from saxophone to sousaphone. Upon entering Ohio State in fall 1994 with a plan to become a lawyer, he tried out for the Marching Band, but was cut during tryouts. He earned a spot the following year. In 1996, he switched his major to music. He went on to dot the "i" on November 21, 1998 at the home game against Michigan. Waters was a band member through 1999. In 2000, he received a bachelor's degree in music education.

=== Ohio State ===
In 2000, Waters began his professional career as a band director, staying on with The Ohio State University Marching Band as a graduate assistant. In 2002 he was hired as an assistant director. Upon the retirement of director Jon Woods in September 2011, Waters was given the role of interim director. On 10 October 2012, executive dean and vice provost of the College of Arts and Sciences Joseph Steinmetz, announced his promotion to director.

On October 6, 2012 at the home game vs. Nebraska, Waters' band performed a video game tribute show featuring use of animations, including a horse which galloped down the field and then reared up on its hindquarters, as well as the Tetris and Pac-Man video games. This show received national attention, with a YouTube video achieving four million views by the following Monday. In 2013 the band began using iPads to reduce paper usage and to design and execute more complex shows. Waters and his staff created shows with extensive animation, including a Michael Jackson show which animated Mr. Jackson moonwalking and doing "the splits", and the Hollywood Blockbuster show with animations of Superman saving a falling building, Harry Potter winning a Quidditch match, a dinosaur eating a Michigan football player, and an epic battle at sea between two sailing ships.

The band and Waters received national attention for these shows, and Waters was interviewed by a long list of national news outlets, including Good Morning America, The Today Show, CNN, and USA Today. In May 2014 he delivered a TEDx talk on "Tradition thru Innovation".

=== Dismissal controversy ===
On July 24, 2014, Ohio State president Michael V. Drake announced that, following an investigation of the marching band culture, Waters had been dismissed, alleging that the marching band had fostered a highly sexualized culture that promoted sexual harassment. Waters was fired on the basis that he "knew or should have known" about the alleged problems within the band but failed to address them.

Subsequently, several problems were found in the investigation report that was used as cause to fire Waters. Several witnesses stepped forward and claimed that their testimony had been used out of context, and that they disagreed with the conclusions of the investigation. The former Title IX coordinator for Ohio State alleged that she was prevented by her superior from doing her job effectively with respect to the marching band, however a third-party investigator determined that there was insufficient evidence to support this claim.

On September 11, 2014, the Department of Education announced that it had agreed to conclude a four-year investigation of Ohio State ahead of schedule due to its handling of the Jon Waters case. The following day the marching band alumni organization released its own investigation report into the circumstances around Waters' firing, alleging many problems with the original investigation, and suggesting that Waters was sacrificed to prove Title IX compliance to the Department of Education.

Waters sued for reinstatement later in September, accusing the university, President Drake, and a provost of discriminating against him by disciplining him differently than a female employee and denying him due process. Ohio State responded with a press release, now claiming that Waters had concealed the culture, and "took it upon himself to take corrective action". On October 23, Ohio State filed a response to this lawsuit, renewing its claims of a sexualized culture, and offering additional evidence of that culture. The filing also emphasized claims that Waters misled investigators regarding the degree of problems in the band.

=== Heidelberg University ===
He was Assistant Professor of Music Education and Director of Bands at Heidelberg University, Ohio from 2016 until 2022.

=== Bowling Green State University ===
Since September 2022, Waters has served as the director of the Falcon Marching Band at Bowling Green State University. Under his leadership, the program has reached its largest size in history, boasting over 600 members in 2026. Making the Falcon Marching Band one of the largest collegiate marching bands in FBS College Football.
