= Ohio State University Marching Band =

American university marching brass band

The Ohio State University Marching Band
- School: Ohio State University
- Location: Columbus, Ohio
- Conference: Big Ten
- Founded: 1878
- Director: Christopher Hoch
- Associate Director: Philip Day
- Assistant Director: Josh Reynolds
- Members: 228 (192 pregame marchers, 195 halftime marchers, 36 alternate members)
- Practice field: Lincoln Tower Field
- Fight song: "Across the Field", "Buckeye Battle Cry"

Uniform
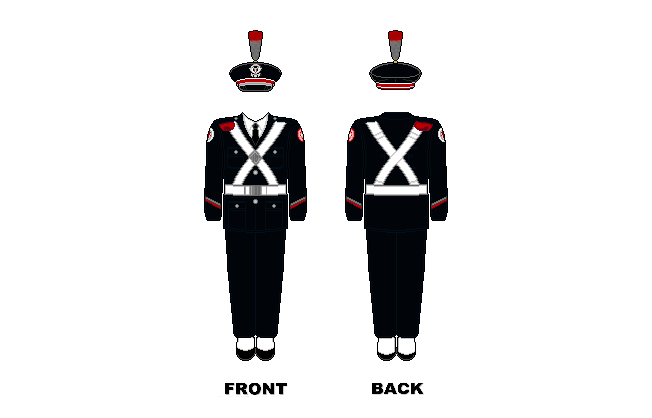
- Website: https://tbdbitl.osu.edu/

The Ohio State University Marching Band (OSUMB) is a university marching band named for and a part of Ohio State University. The band, nicknamed The Best Damn Band in the Land (TBDBITL) (pronounced /təˈbɪtəl/), performs at football games and other events during the fall semester. It is one of the few collegiate all-brass and percussion bands in the country, and sometimes deemed the largest of its type in the world.

== History ==
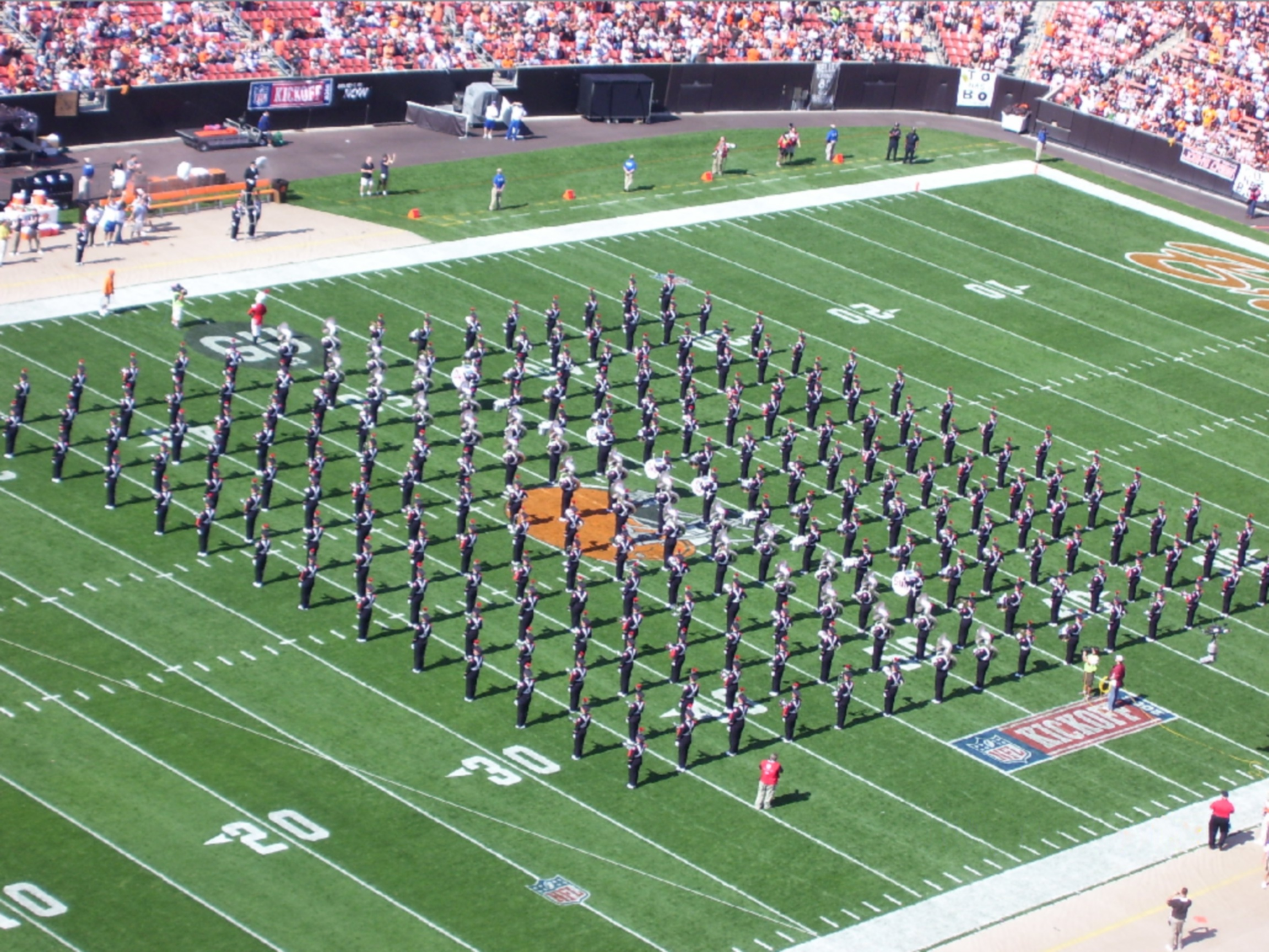
The 2008 Ohio State marching band is seen performing before the Cleveland Browns season opening game of the 2008 season.

The band was initially founded in 1878 as a student-led fife and drum corps that provided music for the university ROTC program. In 1896, university officials hired Gustav Bruder as the first band director. Under Bruder's leadership, the band grew in size, and, after merging with the short-lived Varsity Band in 1920, introduced its first "modern" drum major, Edwin "Tubby" Essington. Essington introduced a style of showmanship to the position that had not been seen previously, a style which is emulated today.

In 1928, the band introduced the Ramp Entrance, which survives virtually unchanged today. That same year, Eugene J. Weigel became band director. During his tenure, Weigel introduced many of the hallmarks of the OSUMB, including floating and animated formations, the uniforms, and Script Ohio. Weigel also enlarged the band from 100 to its longtime standard of 120 members in 1930 and introduced the distinctive all-brass and percussion instrumentation of the ensemble in 1934.

In 1952, the band split from the ROTC and came under the auspices of the School of Music. As a result, the band began to experiment with more modern styles of music, eventually leading to the introduction of the band's arrangement of "Hang On, Sloopy" in 1965. In 1957, director Jack Evans moved the band's pregame rehearsal to the newly built St. John Arena. Over time, this pregame rehearsal evolved into the traditional Skull Session that occurs before each home game.

Also during this period, Charles Spohn introduced the annual Alumni Reunion, which was first held in 1966 and continues to this day.

Paul Droste became band director in 1970 and began to expand the band for the first time in over 40 years in 1972. After the passing of Title IX legislation in 1973, women joined the band for the first time. The band would further expand to 225 members shortly thereafter.

Jon Woods began his tenure as director in 1984. Under his leadership, the band was awarded the Sudler Trophy. In 2001, the band moved from its longtime rehearsal hall inside Ohio Stadium to the newly built Steinbrenner Band Center.

In the 2010s, the band added three percussion spots, coming to its current size of 228.

=== World War Two Years: low enrollment forces compromises ===
The Pearl Harbor attack followed OSU’s 1941 football season. Though the number of enlisted military on campus would grow, civilian enrollment soon declined. Some 8259 men were enrolled for fall 1941; by fall 1942 it was 7605 men, and only 6567 men for winter (January-March) 1943.

The band was still at full strength for fall 1942, but enrollment was steadily declining, from 1940-41’s 14,056 to spring 1943’s 7,255. The band's most compromised season was 1943; it could not maintain its traditional size or all-brass instrumentation. A few days before its 25 September 1943 season opener, the student newspaper reported that “To date only 60 men have appeared for rehearsals and there is a possibility that women may have to be added. Present plans are for a singing-marching chorus to supplement the less than 20 instrumentalists expected.” New director Willam B. McBride considered 120 members a 'must,' explaining that ‘All our formations are built on a 12-by-10 pattern. If we don’t get 120 men, then we’ll have to take 120 women’—though the band was then “under the wing of the military department and to use either an all-girl band or a mixed band would mean loss of military status.” Also, before 1943’s first game, the Ohio State Lantern announced the band’s plans: “there is a possibility that women may have to be added. Present plans all for a singing-marching chorus to supplement the less than 120 instrumentalists expected.”

The Lima (OH) News likewise noted that “Present plans, initiated by Prof. Eugene J. Weigel, music department chairman and former band director call for a marching-singing group, with vocalists used to supplement the less-than-120 instrumentalists who are expected to show up. The all-brass band, set up by Weigel in 1934--the first in the country--is ‘out’…[according to] McBride…with woodwinds cordially invited to attend.” The band did not appear at the 25 September opener: “Never before has an Ohio State band been absent from a game after the beginning of classes….Filling in at the last moment and doing the job very capably was the all-soldier band made up of members from the ASTP unit stationed on campus.”

The 1943 band's debut was at the 2 October game on campus: “Ohio state’s no longer all-brass Marching Band”…. which for the first time in nine years will use woodwinds in addition to brass instruments, will be the same high-stepping outfit as always, Professor McBride added….A new feature this year will be a twenty-voice chorus which will supplement the band.” Only 100 men took the field for that performance, but the student newspaper remained supportive: “Although the all-male aggregation boasted only 100 members, including a marching group, the performance was of the same outstanding caliber as those of the 120-piece organization of past years.”

The band’s 1944 season—apparently without woodwinds—began with an undersized complement: “Cyril Costoff…drum major…to head the 100-piece band. ‘We expect to have the full 120-piece band for the [21 October] game, [Concert Band director John C.] Worley added.” In mid-October, director McBride “asked for 15 to 50 more volunteers, both instrument players and marchers, to strut their stuff at the halves,” Indeed, for the 21 October game against the Great Lakes Navy team, the band fielded 120 men, and for 1945, following the war’s end, the band had no problem marching 120 instrumentalists.

=== 2014 investigation ===
The band made national headlines in the summer of 2014 following the release of an internal investigation into the band's culture and reported incidents of hazing. On July 22, 2014, Ohio State University released an investigation report titled "Complaint against Jonathan Waters, Director of the OSU Marching Band." In the report, the university's Office of Compliance and Integrity found that the band's "culture facilitated acts of sexual harassment" and that then-director Jon Waters knew or reasonably should have known about this culture."

On July 24, 2014, following a two-month investigation into complaints of a "sexualized" culture amongst band members, Waters was fired by the university. Waters later denied the report's characterizations of the band and of his actions.

A second investigation was led by former Ohio attorney general Betty Montgomery. The task force report, released on November 18, 2014, identified a number of issues within the band, making 37 recommendations for changes, but also criticized Ohio State University for decades of lax oversight and inadequate resources for enforcing compliance. The task force final report included results of a survey of 278 then current and recent former band members (see Appendix D). The survey seemed to contradict many of the university's claims about Mr. Waters and the band.

=== New era ===
Following Waters' firing, Ohio State alumnus Christopher Hoch was promoted from interim director to director of marching and athletic bands. Under Hoch's leadership, the band performed at the 2015 NFL International Series game between the Jacksonville Jaguars and the Buffalo Bills at Wembley Stadium, the 2018 Macy's Thanksgiving Day Parade, and the 2019, 2022, and 2025 Rose Bowls.

In March 2026, the band traveled to Ireland to perform in the St. Patrick's Day Parade in Dublin, Ireland, along with additional performances and appearances throughout the country. On October 10, 2026, the band celebrated the 90th anniversary of Script Ohio.

=== Directors ===
Name	Years
Gustav Bruder	1896–1928
Eugene J. Weigel	1929–1938
Manley R. Whitcomb	1939–43, 1946–51
William B. McBride	1943–45
Jack Oliver Evans	1952–1963
Charles L. Spohn	1964–69
Paul Edwin Droste	1970–83
Jon R. Woods	1984–2011
Jonathan Waters	2012–2014
Christopher Hoch	2015–present

=== Associate Directors ===
Name	Years
Jack O. Evans	1950-1951
Charles Spohn	1962-1963
Jon R. Woods	1974-1983
Christopher Hoch	2013-2014
Phillip Day	2015-Present

=== Assistant Directors ===
Name	Years
Milford Landis	1921-1923
Elvin Donaldson	1923-1932
Manley R. Whitcomb	1936-1938
Clare Grundman	1937-1940
Donald E. McGinnis	1941, 1946
John C. Worley	1942-1944
Justin Gray	1945
Jack O. Evans	1947-1949
Forrest Stoll	1948-1955
Charles Spohn	1951-1963
Richard Suddendorf	1956-1957
Fred Dart	1963-1965
Paul Droste	1966-1968
Donald Hower	1969
James Jones	1969
Charles Temple	1972-1973
Willie Sullivan	1974-1985
Paul F. Doerksen	1994
John Fuller	1995
Matthew Sexton	1996-1997
Erica Neidlinger	1998-1999
Jonathan Waters	2002-2011
Christopher Hoch	2012
Michael Smith	2014-2022
Josh Reynolds	2023-Present

=== Percussion Instructors ===
Name	Years
James Moore	1981-2004
Gary Hodges	2005-2010
Aaron Bell	2011-2013
Mark Reynolds	2014-Present

== Instrumentation ==
The Ohio State University Marching Band consists of 228 student musicians, with an all-brass and percussion instrumentation based on the tradition of British brass bands (other than the tenor drums). The pregame block seen at each home game consists of 192 members, with the remaining 36 as alternates. An additional bass drum, pair of cymbals, and tenor drum join the block for the halftime performance. The band has no auxiliary groups connected with it unlike most bands.

Tryouts for the band are held in August each year, with all newcoming and returning candidates assessed on their musical and marching abilities.

The block is divided into rows, which are each assigned a letter: A, B, C, E, F, H, I, J, K, L, M, Q, R, S, T, or X. The rows are paired in sister rows as follows: A-X, B-T, C-S, E-R, F-Q, H-M, I-J, K-L. Each row in the 192 block band contains the following:

- A Row: 7 Trumpets, 5 E♭ Cornets
- B Row: 12 Trumpets
- C Row: 12 Flugelhorns
- E Row: 12 Mellophones
- F Row: 9 Trombones, 3 Bass Trombones
- H Row: 12 Baritones
- I Row: 12 Snare Drums
- J Row: 4 Bass drums (two 26", two 30"), 4 Cymbals, 4 Tenors (Sextets)
- K Row: 12 Sousaphones
- L Row: 12 Sousaphones
- M Row: 12 Baritones
- Q Row: 9 Trombones, 3 Bass Trombones
- R Row: 12 Mellophones
- S Row: 6 Flugelhorns and 6 Trumpets
- T Row: 12 Trumpets
- X Row: 7 Trumpets, 5 E♭ Cornets

Each row, with the exception of J Row, has two non-marching members known as alternates. Alternates, though not marching, often have the responsibility of handling props or other equipment. Additionally, alternates must challenge for a spot in the block each week. These challenges, overseen by the squad leaders, evaluate both the challenger and challengee on music and marching to determine the best composition for the upcoming show.

=== Previously used instruments ===
The Marching Band has used instruments from the following manufacturers in past years.

Brass:

- E♭Cornets - Getzen Capri, York
- B♭Cornets and Trumpets - Yamaha Xeno,
- B♭Flugelhorns - Getzen Capri, Yamaha, Couesnon
- E♭Alto Horns - Yamaha, Holton, Couesnon, H.N. White/King
- F Mellophones - Getzen
- B♭Tromboniums and Tenor Horns - Conn, King
- B♭Trombones - King, Bach, Reynolds
- B♭Baritones/Euphoniums - King, Conn (Double belled Euphoniums were also common)
- Sousaphones (E♭and B♭) - Conn, King

Percussion:

- Snares - Mapex, Pearl, Yamaha, Ludwig, Gretsch (various models have had wood or aluminum shells)
- Tenors - Mapex, Pearl, Yamaha, Ludwig (Ludwig created the first set of canvas strapped tenor duos for the band, whereas trios and quads were worn with standard shoulder harnesses)
- Basses - Mapex, Pearl, Yamaha, Ludwig, Gretsch
- Cymbals - Sabian, Paiste

=== Squad leaders ===
Each row of the band has one Squad Leader, and one Assistant Squad Leader, with exception of J row which has two Assistants. Squad leaders are selected by the directing staff based on 1) a vote from the members of their rows, and 2) an interview with the director(s) and a representative of the administrative staff. Squad leaders are in charge of their rows and report to the directing staff. Specific duties delegated to squad leaders include assisting the directing staff in conducting marching drills and evaluating candidates during tryout week, assisting with weekly challenges and music checks, assisting with uniform inspections, facilitating inter-row communication, and providing on-the-field and off-the-field leadership to the members of their rows.

== Uniforms ==
=== Early years ===
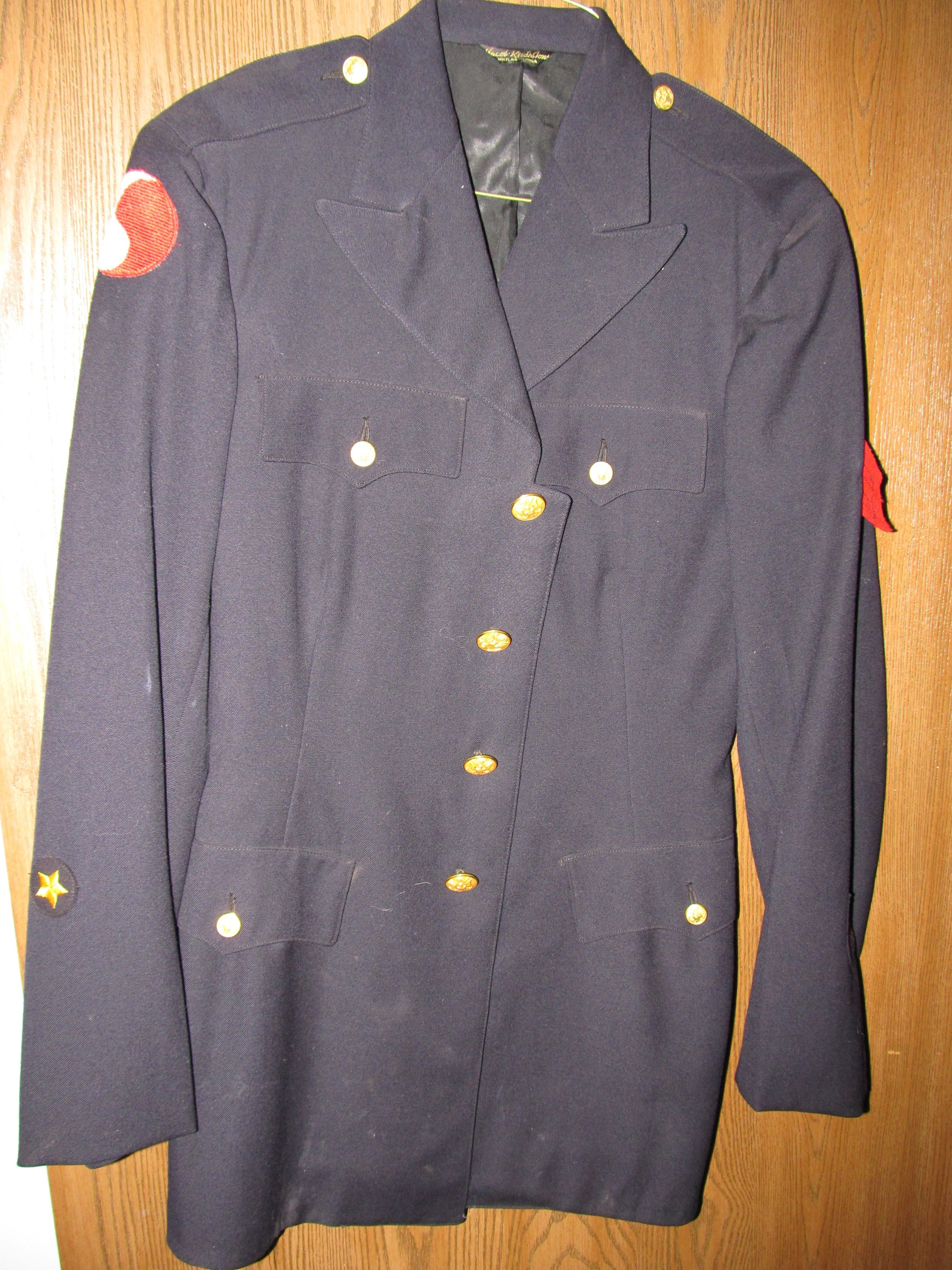
A 1930s or early 1940s Ohio State University ROTC uniform. The red and gray shoulder sleeve insignia and ROTC Honor School Award star are visible in this photograph.

The current OSUMB uniform is very different from the earliest uniforms. The earliest band uniforms were military in style and were pieced together from U.S. military uniforms with pieces dating back to even the Civil War era. High collar jackets were the first solidified design for the band uniform. The first hats worn by the band were Pershing style military visor caps with military “peace” eagles as the hat emblem and red and gray “powder puff” plumes, so called because of the very fine, almost down-like feathers with which they were constructed. OSU also experimented with gray wool bucket hats that looked similar to a kepi or shako with a plume.

As a Land-Grant school, Ohio State was required to provide military training as part of its core curriculum. Prior to World War II, each college ran its ROTC program as an independent organization with National guidelines. Each college designed its own uniforms and insignia to promote esprit de corps. Once an ROTC cadet graduated and received a military commission, then the new officer would wear the uniform of his or her respective branch. After World War II, ROTC programs were modified, ending college-specific uniforms for non-military colleges, and allowing cadets to wear the uniform of their chosen branch.

OSU ROTC's shoulder insignia was a red and gray circle. This was worn on the right shoulder. On the right sleeve, a five pointed star signifying OSU was the recipient of the ROTC Honor School award was worn. Near the cuff of the left sleeve, a shield patch with U.S. R.O.T.C embroidered on it was worn. If the cadet had attained a rank in ROTC, they wore their rank insignia on each sleeve. The color of rank chevrons and the ROTC shield patch were determined by the military division in which the cadet was looking to commission. For example, an Artillery cadet would wear a black shield with scarlet lettering and black chevrons on a scarlet background, while an Infantry cadet would wear a black shield with teal lettering and black chevrons on a teal background. The hat took on a more modern look as well, looking more like the modern military style visor hat. ROTC chin straps and uniform buttons were gold colored. The peace eagle remained, but an addition was made to the eagles, an extra banner that arced above the E. Pluribus Unum banner from the eagle’s beak. This banner simply read “OHIO,” earning the OSUMB’s peace eagles the nickname “Eagle Ohio.” These early Eagle Ohios were made in gold colored metal to match the buttons and chin strap of the uniform jacket and hat. The regular uniform of an OSU ROTC cadet included a navy blue service coat, a light blue dress shirt, black tie, navy blue pants, white cotton spats, black dress shoes, and a white canvas belt with a gold buckle.

This uniform was standard for all branches of ROTC. Since the OSUMB was under control of the ROTC department for much of its early existence, the band uniform was simply the ROTC uniform with more additions, such as plumes, gloves, and West-point style Cadet cross belts. The red and gray plumes took on more of an upright style that is still seen today. Kappa Kappa Psi, the national honorary band fraternity, designed a special recognition bar for wear on band uniforms by brothers during these early days of college bands. This recognition bar is the same size and shape as a military ribbon. The bar is blue and white, separated along a diagonal axis, with the Greek letters K K Ψ along this diagonal. The letters are gold. This bar was to be worn on uniforms in the same manner as military ribbons, and the OSUMB allowed all KKY brothers to wear this bar.

=== 1950s–1980s ===
In 1952, the OSUMB formally ended ties with the ROTC department. Around the same time, the Lily Ames Co., the last supplier of OSU-specific ROTC uniforms, closed its doors. OSU bought the remaining uniforms from Lily Ames. The band had custom patches sewn on to the jacket shoulders. Rank insignia was also removed from the band uniforms. The right shoulder held a gray circular patch with a red Buckeye leaf and around the edge of the patch read: The Ohio State University Buckeyes. The left shoulder patch was a miniature of The Ohio State University seal. The patch was red with the edge reading: The Ohio State University -Columbus-. During this time, Tau Beta Sigma, the national honorary band sorority, became active in the OSUMB as well, even though women were not permitted to be in the band on the field. At this point, all of the sisters of the sorority were given unique uniforms. The sisters wore the same jacket, shirt, and tie as the band members. The sisters wore long military-style dress skirts, hose, and female style military dress shoes. The sisters wore their ΤΒΣ recognition bar (identical to the fraternity version) on their uniforms. Women could fulfill roles with the band as secretaries and librarians, but were not permitted to march.

During the 1960s and 1970s, these uniforms became outdated. The Fechheimer Bros. of Cincinnati created some uniforms for OSU. These uniforms were the same navy blue as the previous uniforms, except the buttons were changed to silver. At this time the chin straps and Eagle Ohio were also changed to silver. The plumes took on the modern red and gray appearance and were constructed of tough turkey feathers. The spats were changed from cloth to vinyl during this time as well. The shoulder patches changed design and size. The uniforms changed very little from the 1970s until 1988, except for things like hat manufacturer, a short period in which a large metal diamond Ohio replaced the Eagle Ohio, and the use of aluminum hat bands instead of the silver adjustable type. After the directorship of Charles Spohn, the Kappa Kappa Psi and Tau Beta Sigma recognition bars were no longer authorized for wear on the OSUMB uniform. During the expansion years in the 1970s, many uniforms dating back to the 1940s had to be dug out of storage and updated with the current patch designs of the band. To a careful and up-close observer, one would notice significant differences in the cut and style of the uniforms being worn. Even hats were not standardized. The only common thread among the uniforms was the color, which even began to fade on older uniforms. It was common practice for band members to use black marker to fix frayed parts of the uniform which exposed white cotton lining. These uniforms also had to be used by the Military band, and were falling apart. Pieces were sourced as needed from manufacturers such as Ostwald, Bayly, Frechheimer, and DeMoulin Brothers. The Fechheimer Corporation began producing a police uniform in the 1980s that matched the design of the Marching Band uniforms. These eventually became the standard replacement uniform coat until 1989, when Dr. Woods commissioned a new uniform style.

=== 1988 remodel ===
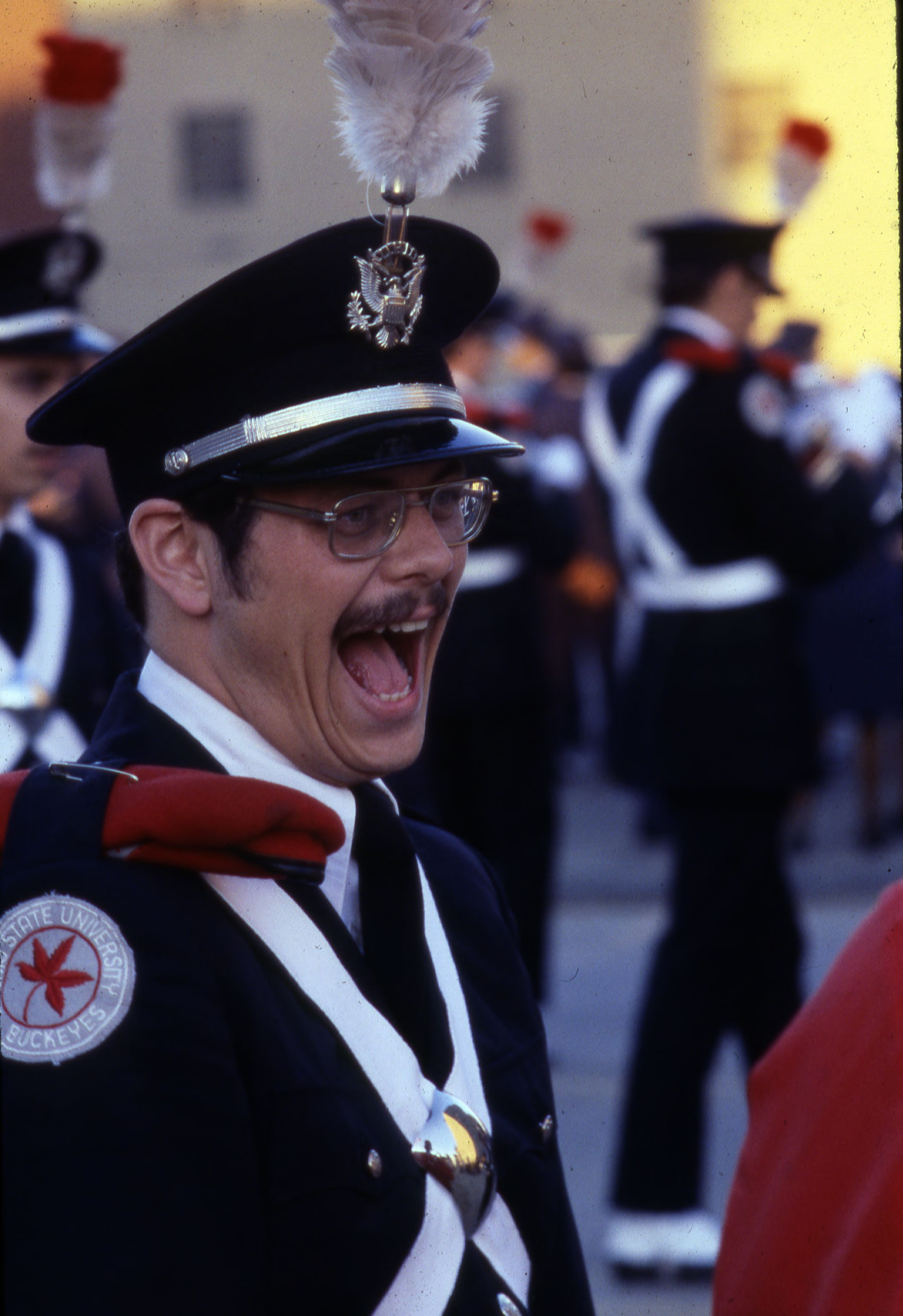

In 1988, Dr. Jon Woods commissioned the biggest changes to the OSUMB uniform. The Fechheimer Bros. also constructed these uniforms. Everything visible was changed to some extent. These uniforms debuted for the homecoming game against Purdue in 1988.

=== 2006 changes ===
From 1989 until 2005, it was common practice for the Marching Band to only purchase a few new uniforms each season to replace badly worn, damaged, or lost pieces. The Fruhauf Company made these small batches of uniforms. In 2005, a benefactor to the OSUMB donated a significant amount of money to buy new uniforms for the entire band. The benefactor wanted to uniform the entire band and not just have the money used for replacement uniforms. Dr. Jon Woods decided that additional small changes would help to give the band a new, fresh look for the 2006 season. The minimal changes include updated sleeve stripes (new stripes consist of one red and one gray stripe) to minimize the wearing out that the old stripes suffered, uniform patch alignment, and a slit placed underneath the left breast pocket flap for the snare drums to attach their drums through (the common practice through band history was to cut a hole underneath the pocket flap to allow the attachment clip to pass through the uniform).

=== 2013 changes ===
In 2013, the band received a substantial boost in funding, which allowed the band to supply more uniform parts free of charge that were previously purchased by band students. The band also purchased new cold weather overcoats that could be worn in the stands during a game. Previous cold weather coats included black wool, collared jackets from Holloway and Liz Claiborne. In 2013, the band has switched to double breasted wool overcoats which are similar to the U.S. Army's Class A overcoat. This coat features six Great Seal of Ohio buttons, and has large pockets to keep band members' hands warm while not playing their instrument. The band also changed the vinyl spats. Previously worn spats had white elastic straps, which were a custom ordered product. Due to shortages in marching band spats across the United States, the band opted to wear standard white vinyl spats which have a black elastic strap.

=== 2025 changes ===
In 2025, the band debuted a new set of uniforms for the first time since 2006. The uniform design remained the exact same, however the uniforms are now made with synthetic materials rather than the previous wool uniforms. The uniforms incorporated modern materials designed to improve performer comfort, flexibility, and durability. The new uniforms were funded through support from Ohio State President Walter “Ted” Carter Jr., the Office of the President, Senior Vice President for Student Life Melissa Shivers, and the Office of Student Life.

=== Drum Major uniform ===
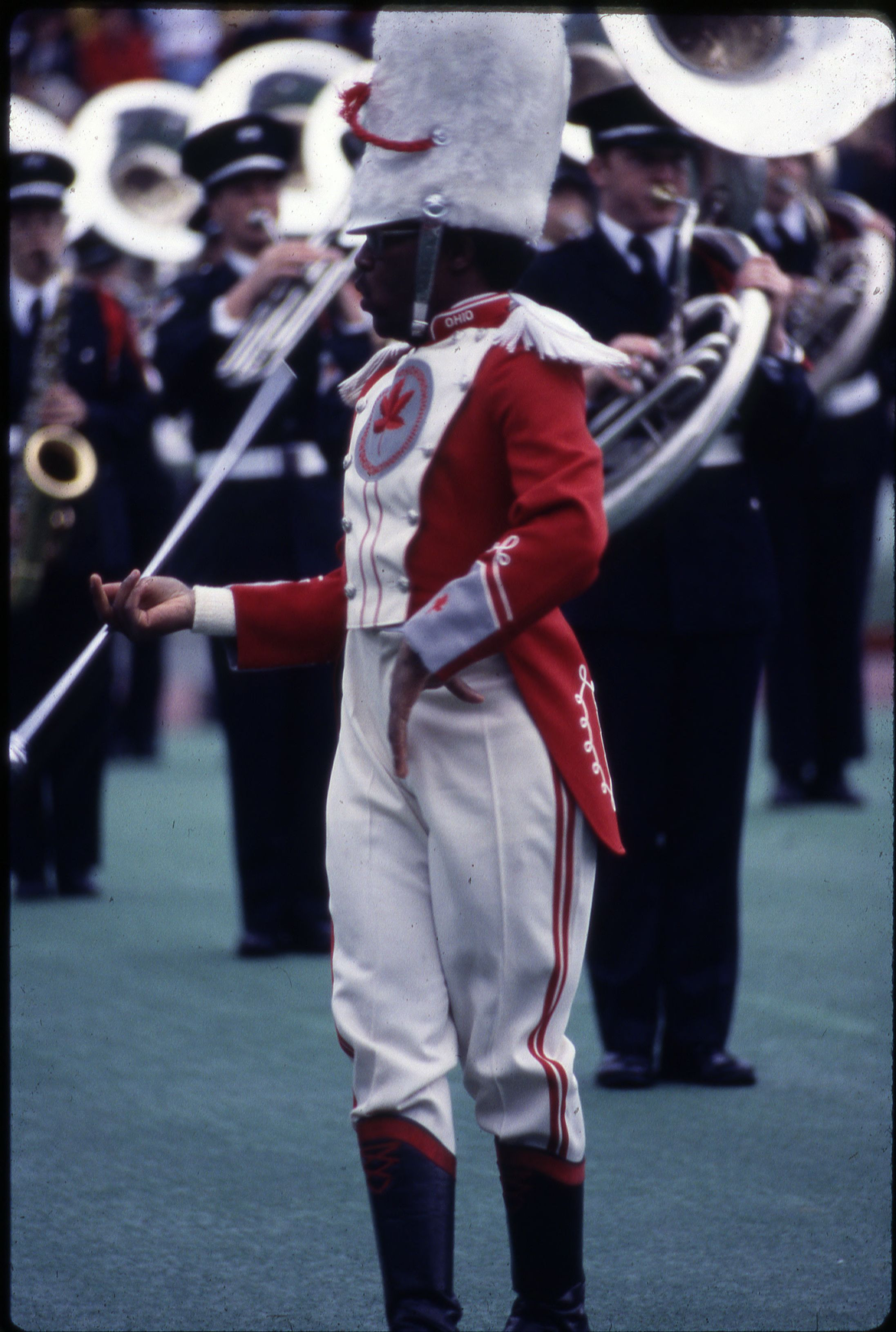
Dwight Hudson, OSU Drum Major (1977-1979)

The drum major’s uniform has gone through countless changes since “Tubby” Essington’s uniform in the early days of the band. Every drum major uniform of the band is custom-tailored. Shortly after drum major tryouts in the spring, the Fruhauf Uniform company sends a representative to take exact measurements of the drum major and assistant drum major. At this point, the drum major is free to take artistic license on the style of their uniform. They can choose to model their uniform on a style consistent since the 1950s, with minor changes or they may choose to make more striking changes, which require approval of the directing staff. Most drum majors only choose small modifications, such as wearing of tassels on the tall fur hat or the set up of any cords worn adorning the hat. The modern drum major uniform, chosen by most drum majors without significant altering, has its roots in the 1950s.

=== Director uniforms ===
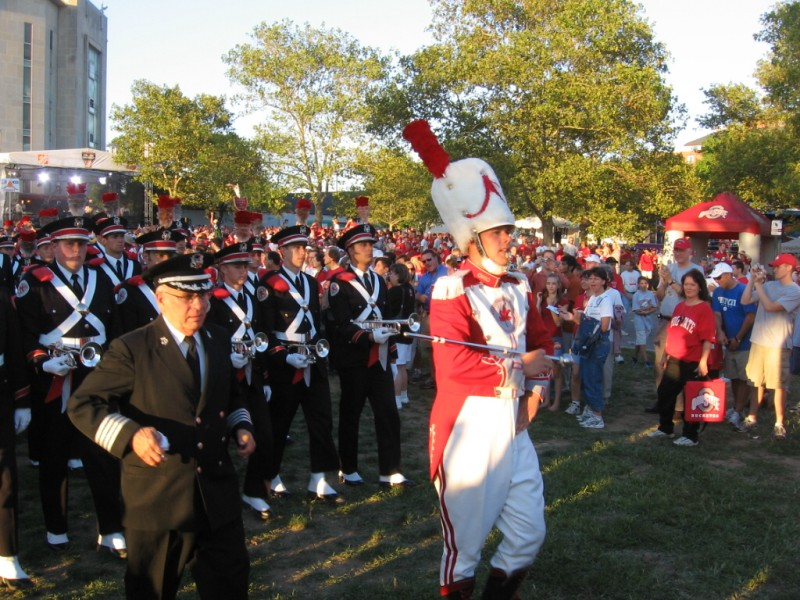
The OSUMB marches to Ohio Stadium after Skull Session. Seen in detail are the drum major uniform and the director's uniform. The four sleeve stripes and "scrambled eggs" visor shown that Jon Woods is the director of the band.

The directing staff has worn uniforms of differing style to the marching band since its inception. The uniforms took on a style similar to the U.S. Navy’s double-breasted dress jacket in the 1940s and 1950s. Directing staff had two thin golden stripes running around the circumference of the cuff area of the sleeves, similar to the U.S. Navy’s ranking system stripes. Directing staff also wore two lapel lyre-shaped insignia. These were gold along with all of the buttons on the uniforms. The directors wore the same hat as the marching band minus the plume.

Director uniforms have come in various levels of decoration, some being very basic, others having plenty of designs and embroidery. Directing staff started using a sleeve stripe ranking system under Jack Evans, but pictures from Evans' and Charlie Spohn's directorships show that there wasn't a clearly defined pattern for the stripes. Eventually, Dr. Paul Droste introduced the sleeve rank structure used today. His uniform had three stripes denoting him as director, and the Associate director, Jon Woods, had two stripes. The current sleeve stripe scheme is: 4 stripes for Director, 3 stripes for Associate Director, 2 stripes for Assistant Director and 1 stripe for Graduate Assistant Director.

Droste also was the first to use a military style hat with the “scrambled eggs” acorns and leaves visor. Other directors had used various styles of band hats with varying levels of ornamentation. Woods, Waters and Hoch have continued the scrambled eggs tradition with their uniform hats.

Other members of the band staff such as School of Music staff who conduct (including Dr. Mikkelson and Dr. Jones during their term of interim leadership) and Marching Band staff who do not conduct wear gray blazer jackets with the OSUMB crest embroidered on the left pocket, white dress shirt with an OSUMB red tie (or any red styled tie), black dress pants and shoes.

=== Blazer Uniform ===
Prior to the 1960s, the band wore a modified version of the full uniform on away trips. The modified uniform was also worn when the band was in concert. This consisted of the band hat without plume and a white waist belt was worn instead of cross belts. The band also wore a red citation cord on the left shoulder. As more away trips were taken, the band found it necessary to create a separate travel uniform which allowed the regular uniform to stay clean and pressed. Band students wear a black blazer with a embroidered OSUMB crest on the left brest pocket, white dress shirt, red OSUMB tie, gray pants, and black shoes. Band students often collect pins at various trips they attend, which they then wear on the Blazer uniform.

=== Gray Day Uniform ===
The Gray Day Uniform has been seen in photos as early as the 1960s. The purpose of the Gray Uniform is to give the band staff an idea of what the band looks like in formations while dressed alike. This allows for last minute modifications to drill without making the band wear full uniform. The Gray Uniform consists of a gray T-shirt and gray shorts. The band hat with plume is worn with this uniform.

== Drum major ==
The band has been led by a drum major since its inception. In 1920, Edwin "Tubby" Essington became drum major and became known for his distinctive style. In a 1963 Columbus Dispatch article, Jim Cummings recounted that "Essington almost literally turned the Windy City upside down, as he strutted through the downtown streets ahead of State's Band" after a 1921 game against the University of Chicago on the road. Essington's style has formed the basis for every OSUMB drum major since.

Today, the band is led by a head drum major and an assistant drum major, with tryouts usually occurring near the end of the spring semester.

Over the years, drum major has become one of the most competitive positions in the band. In 1979, the band formed a drum major training squad, known as D-Row, to assist in the proper formation of potential drum majors. This group, numbering between one and seven students, work as understudies to the drum major during the marching season. Once an individual has been a member of D-Row for one marching season, they are eligible to try out for drum major. There is a maximum of two years on D-Row membership.

=== "Modern era" drum majors (since 1920) ===
- Edwin 'Tubby' Essington (1920-22)
- Augustus Hall (1923-25)
- Robert Hines (1926-27)
- William Knepper (1928-30)
- Wilbert Pettegrew (1931)
- James McCreary (1932-33)
- William Casey (1934-35)
- Wesley Leas (1936-37)
- Myron McKelvey (1938)
- Dick Jones (1939-40)
- Edward Maundrell (1941)
- Gerald Johnston (1942)
- Robert Gulcher (1943)
- Cyril Costoff (1944)
- Joseph Myers (1945)
- Beverly Moseley (1946)
- Devon Kesling (1947-48)
- Johnny Criss (1949)
- Dale York (1950)
- Jim Spencer (1951)
- Jim Bodman (1952-53)
- George Souder (1954-55)
- Richard Marsh (1956)
- Larry Cory (1957-58)
- Lenny Hart (1959-60)
- Terry Burton (1961)
- Ben Kline (1962)
- Bob "Link" Harper (1963-64)
- Mitch Breece (1965-66)
- Kirby Wyatt (1967)
- Jack Swinehart (1968)
- Wayne Long (1969-70)
- Paul Zubrod (1971)
- Barry Kopetz (1972-73)
- Richard Gammage (1974-75)
- Doug Secrist (1976)
- Dwight Hudson (1977-79)
- Oliver McGee (1980)
- Shelley Graf (1981)
- Bruce Hart (1982-83)
- Andy Marks (1984)
- Greg Eyer (1985-86)
- Rich Parks (1987-88)
- Dale Wagner (1989-90)
- Lee Sartore (1991)
- Brian Berendts (1992-93)
- Karl Neudorfer (1994-95)
- Cory Thompson (1996-97)
- Scott Sommer (1998)
- Matt Bally (1999-2000)
- Adam Prescott (2001-02)
- Kathryn Mitchell (2003)
- Eric Sommer (2004)
- Alex Neffenger (2005)
- Stewart Kitchen (2006-07)
- Josh Halter (2008-09)
- Jason Stuckert (2010-11)
- Kyle West (2012-13)
- David Pettit (2014)
- Nathan MacMaster (2015)
- John LaVange (2016-17)
- Morgan Davis (2018-19)
- Konner Barr (2018-19)
- Brayden Deemer (2020)
- Austin Bowman (2021-22)
- Clayton Callender (2023-24)
- Joshua Ford (2025)
- Ben Fox (2026)

== Traditions ==
=== Script Ohio and dotting the "i" ===
First performed by the OSUMB in 1936, Script Ohio is one of the signatures of the Ohio State University Marching Band. The band begins in a "Block O" formation. Then, to the tune of "Le Regiment de Sambre et Meuse", the drum major leads a "peeling-off" movement that snakes across the field, forming the letters "OHIO" in cursive. At the climax of this drill maneuver, the drum major leads a sousaphone player to stand as the dot of the "i." Dotting the "i" is considered a high honor, and the privilege is generally bestowed on a senior sousaphone player.

There are three versions of Script Ohio: single Script, which is most common, and double Script. The double Script features all marching members of the band, including alternates, and is made up of condensed versions of the single Script that are performed to both sides of the field. The west side (home side) of the double script is led by the head drum major, while the east side (away side) is led by the assistant drum major. Performances of the double Script are usually reserved for away or bowl games. The third version, quadruple Script, is performed once a year with the Alumni Band during halftime of the band Alumni game.

==== Honorary "i"-dotters ====
On rare occasions, non-band members have been invited to dot the "i". Woody Hayes, Bob Hope, Jack Nicklaus, James "Buster" Douglas, OSU presidents Novice Fawcett, Gordon Gee and their wives, composer Richard Heine, former OSUMB member and director Paul Droste, retired OSU ticket director Robert Ries, John Glenn and his wife Annie Glenn, The Limited Brands founder, chairman, and CEO Leslie Wexner (an OSU alumnus), and former football coach Earle Bruce are among the select few non-band members invited to perform the tradition. The fourth- or fifth-year sousaphone player selected to dot the "i" for that specific game must give up their spot in order for an honorary member to dot the "i".

On November 19, 2011, Jon Woods, the marching band's director for the previous 28 years, dotted the "i" in his final home game directing the band, becoming the only non-band member to dot the "i" during a game where the OSUMB performed Script Ohio twice. The first Script Ohio of that game in its traditional pregame spot featured senior sousaphone player Jonathan Lampley dotting the "i". Woods dotted the "i" in a special second performance of Script Ohio during halftime.

Although not the famous Script Ohio formation, John Glenn and his wife Annie Glenn returned to Ohio Stadium on September 22, 2012, to dot the "i" in the word America during a NASA-themed halftime show paying tribute to Glenn's NASA accomplishments and time as an Ohio senator.

===== List of honorees =====
- Bob Hope, 1978, comedian
- Woody Hayes, 1983, former football coach
- James "Buster" Douglas, 1990, professional boxer
- Jack Nicklaus, 2006, professional golfer
- John and Annie Glenn, 2009, public servants and advocates
- Jon R. Woods, 2011, former band director
- Earle Bruce, 2016, former football coach
- Anthony Violi, 2018, 100-year-old alumnus
- Archie Griffin, 2024, two-time Heisman Trophy winner and former Ohio State Alumni Association President

=== Diamond Ohio ===
The Diamond Ohio logo, which is created by superimposing the I over the center of the H, and making the O's into pointed triangles, was first created by the OSUMB in the late 1930s. The band continues to use this formation today at every home football game as the team entrance tunnel. The Ohio University Marching 110 has also used the Diamond Ohio logo since 1966 when director Gene Thrailkill designed a pregame set modeled after the Ohio State University Marching Band to give the newly reformed Marching 110 a symbol. Photographs show former OSUMB director Manley Whitcomb (1939-1942, 1946-1951) charting this formation on a table lined with field markings, and other photographs depict the band in performance of the Diamond Ohio as far back as 1939. Today, the formation is used as the team runs through the tunnel onto the field.

=== Skull Session ===
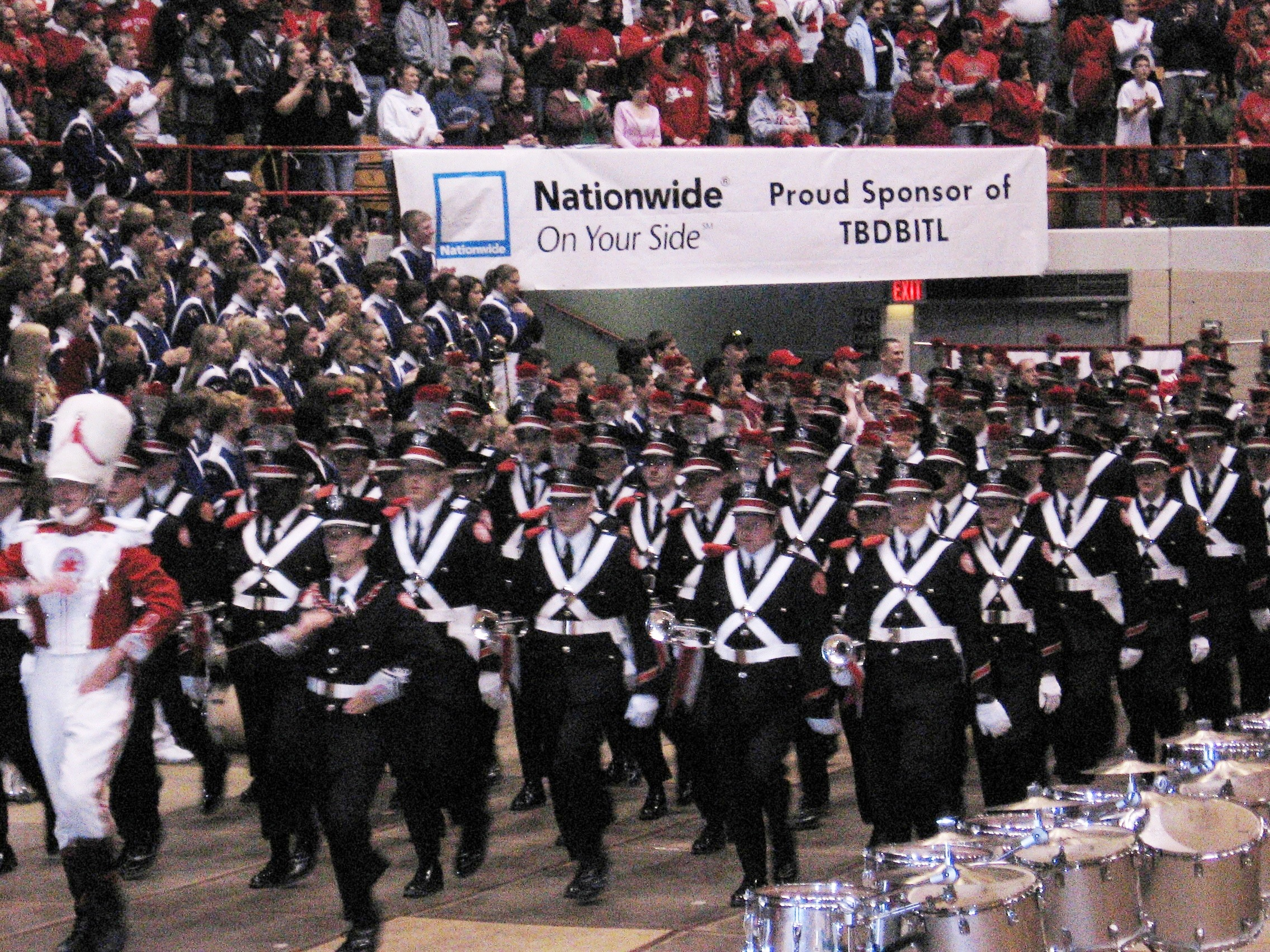
The OSUMB arrives in St. John Arena for the Skull Session. The detail of the Drum Major and Assistant Drum Major uniforms can be seen.

The first Skull Session held at St. John Arena was in 1957. Prior to this, Skull Session was nothing more than a final run through of the music on the morning of the game. Originally, these were closed rehearsals that the band eventually opened up to friends and family members. Each week, more and more people showed up to hear the band rehearse that the director, Jack Evans, decided to move the rehearsal to St. John Arena across the street. Today, upwards of 14,000 people pack St. John Arena every home game to see the band and football team. Many of these people do not even have tickets to the game, yet travel hours just for a chance to see and hear the band.

During the Skull Session, fans are treated to a variety of activities. Each week the band's "cheer groups" perform a song to go along with the football team's opponent of the week. The cheer groups are selected from their respective sections: E-Fours, Trumpet Cheers (the oldest Cheer Group), Flugelhorn Cheers, Trombone Cheers, Horn Cheers, Baritone Cheers, Stadium Brass (an instrument from every part of the band except percussion), Percussion Cheers, and the Tuba-Fours. At some point after these performances, the football team enters to the sounds of James Swearingen's "Fanfare for a New Era" and Across the Field Immediately after their entrance a pre-selected senior football player speaks to the band and fans in St. John Arena followed by the head coach. The team then exits to the sounds of "Hang On, Sloopy!"

Upon the football team's exit, the band commences with the traditions associated with the Skull Session. This includes performance of "(Fight the Team) Across the Field" first softly and slowly, and on the repeat of the chorus, at the well-known tempo and dynamics. The band is also known for performing "Eternal Father, Strong to Save", otherwise known as "The Navy Hymn", to formally begin every Skull Session concert. This is used to warm up the ensemble while also recognizing veterans in attendance and honoring the ensemble’s military band past. If a visiting band is in attendance, they will perform their pre-game and halftime show, followed by the OSUMB's performance of pre-game and halftime.

There is often a visiting Ohio high school band that will play before the Skull Session, as well as a feature during the Skull Session. The OSU Athletic Band also performs at a Skull Session once per season, trading off with the guest high school band. The Athletic Band is run by the same band staff as the marching band, and often has many students who perform in both. Starting in 2021, Skull Session is livestreamed on YouTube.

=== Ramp entrance & Pregame ===
The ramp entrance is one of the most highly regarded traditions among band members, and is infamous for being very physically demanding. The ramp entrance starts with around 19:45 remaining on the countdown clock. A short video is shown on the scoreboard prior to the band emerging from the ramp tunnel. At the end of this video, Diamond Ohio appears on the screen. This is the cue for the percussion section to start down the ramp.

The percussion section is the first to march down the ramp, and onto the field; not to cadences, rather, silently, at a precise tempo of 180 beats per minute (bpm), and the snare drums perform a unique arm swing. A series of elaborately timed flanking maneuvers called the "power V" leads JI Row into their file in the block.

The "Ramp" cadence is then played exactly 17 times in a row, also at 180 bpm, as the other rows in the band file down the ramp, onto the field, and into their positions. Once a row is placed, the members mark time until all rows are into position.

As the final two rows, T and X file in, their squad leaders nod to the two sousaphone (KL Row) squad leaders, who then sound a loud blast on their whistles. The entire band responds to this call with a deafening yell of "Whistle!" After the last Ramp cadence, the entire band shouts "Fight!", a roll-off is played, and the entire band (except JI Row) performs a conversion step maneuver, and a horns-up.

The band proceeds to play the intro of "Buckeye Battle Cry" while marking time. This is followed by the verse, while the band goes into what is referred to as a "half-time step" (mark time); one step per every two beats. During the verse, a member's leg lift (completion of a full chair step) is crucial for a clean and precise look. Also, during the verse, KL Row performs a special horn flash in which they tilt their bells slightly back, and swing their entire upper body, including their horn, to the tempo of their step. The KL row horn flash is based on the horn swing that OSUMB sousaphones did while marching until the 1970s.

After the completion of the verse, the band proceeds to march southward down the field to two choruses of Buckeye Battle Cry. The band then executes a "halt, kick, down", followed by a "step-forward about-face." Following this The Star-Spangled Banner is performed, which is typically conducted by the visiting band's director, or a staff member of the OSU School of Music. At this point, the Drum Major runs back through the band, blowing a short whistle to the lead snare drummer, who initiates a roll-off to begin the rest of the pregame show, which includes playing the visiting team's fight song, Script Ohio, Carmen Ohio. The pregame performance concludes with a Diamond Ohio tunnel formation for the team to run through.

=== Back bend ===
During the introduction and verse of "Buckeye Battle Cry", the drum major enters the stadium running down the ramp, then struts through the band and comes to the front of the ranks where they execute a back bend, forming their body into the shape of an O. After a dramatic pause, the drum major's plume - or on special occasions, such as before the annual rivalry game against Michigan, the entire top of the drum major's hat - touches the turf, just before the band begins to play two choruses of "Buckeye Battle Cry" while marching toward the south end zone. The drum major reaches the end zone and tosses the baton over the goal post as the band finishes the downfield march.

=== Neutron Man ===
Orlas King (1942-2004), also known as the Neutron Man, would burst into original dances whenever the band played the Pointer Sisters' "Neutron Dance".

== Filmography ==
Year	Title	Notes
1996	My Fellow Americans	In the movie, Senator Russell Kramer (Jack Lemmon), a Republican from Ohio, wins the election for President of the United States. A pep band, made of mostly squad leaders, was asked to perform for the celebration scenes. The band can be seen for several seconds during the opening credits.
2006	The Pride of the Buckeyes	A documentary produced by WOSU Public Media which follows the Marching Band through the 2005 season. The program starts with scenes from Summer Sessions and Tryouts, and continues through the season, culminating with scenes from the 2006 Fiesta Bowl, and 2006 Drum Major tryouts.
2006	The Daily Show with Jon Stewart: Midwest Midterm Midtacular	Jon Stewart recorded a special episode of The Daily Show on the Ohio State campus, featuring a student-focused theater audience for the episode. The marching band recorded an arrangement of the show's theme song and performed a drill set of the show's logo. The music and drill were featured as the closing credits of this episode.
2020	TBDBITL 141	This documentary goes behind the scenes of the 141st season of the band (the 2018 season).

== Discography ==
Year	Title	Director
1958	Ohio State: Volume 1	Jack O. Evans
1960	Ohio State: Volume 2	Jack O. Evans
1963	Ohio State: Volume 3	Jack O. Evans
1965	Saturday Afternoon at Columbus	Charles L. Spohn
1966	Stadium Favorites	Charles L. Spohn
1968	Buckeye Battle Cry!	Charles L. Spohn
1970	California Here We Come!	Paul E. Droste
1973	Across the Field	Paul E. Droste
1975	Stars, Stripes 'N Brass	Paul E. Droste
1977	Buckeye Bandstand	Paul E. Droste
1978	Hats Off to Heine!	Paul E. Droste
1978	Ohio State Plays Ed Montgomery	Paul E. Droste
1980	Foot Tappers	Paul E. Droste
1982	Brass Roots	Paul E. Droste
1984	The Pride of the Buckeyes	Jon R. Woods
1986	Script Ohio	Jon R. Woods
1988	Strike up the Band	Jon R. Woods
1990	Buckeye Brass	Jon R. Woods
1992	Hang On Sloopy	Jon R. Woods
1994	Chimes and Change	Jon R. Woods
1996	Hey! Buckeyes!	Jon R. Woods
1998	Buckeye Blockbusters!	Jon R. Woods
2000	A Touch of Brass	Jon R. Woods
2002	New Era	Jon R. Woods
2003	Road to the National Championship	Jon R. Woods
2005	The Pride of the Buckeyes Volume II	Jon R. Woods
2007	I Wanna Go Back	Jon R. Woods
2009	Hang On Sloopy Volume II	Jon R. Woods
2011	Buckeye Nation	Jon R. Woods
2013	Buckeye Battle Bangers	Jon R. Woods
2013	Time & Change	Jon Waters
2016	Road to the National Championship Volume II	Christopher Hoch
2020	Marching Across Buckeye Nation	Christopher Hoch

== Accolades ==
The Ohio State University Marching Band has been honored with The Sudler Trophy for outstanding college band, and in 1988 was featured in a multi-page article in USA Today.

The band has also performed in seven Inaugural Parades. The band represented the State of Ohio during the inaugurations of Herbert Hoover, Richard Nixon (1969 and 1973), George H. W. Bush, George W. Bush (2001 and 2005), and Barack Obama (2009).

In 2006, the Marching Band was featured during a taping of The Daily Show With Jon Stewart. Stewart brought his program to Columbus to spotlight Ohio's 2006 gubernatorial race. The band performed an arrangement of the show's theme music, and was featured during the closing segment known as the "Moment of Zen".

During the October 6, 2012 football game between the University of Nebraska–Lincoln and Ohio State, the band performed a tribute to video games, containing music from games such as Pokémon, Super Mario Bros., Halo, Tetris, Pac-Man and The Legend of Zelda. During the performance, the band executed formations based on these video games, including a falling set of Tetris blocks, and an animated galloping figure of Epona. A fan's recording of the performance posted to YouTube the next day soon became a viral video, spread in part through video game fans that were directed to the video. The band's interim director at the time, Jon Waters, had planned for the performance based on the national broadcast of the night game, and that the video game theme would resonate with the college students that had grown up with the games. With the widespread attention to the performance, the school promoted Waters from interim to permanent band director.

For the Homecoming game on October 19, 2012 against the University of Iowa, the band performed a tribute to Michael Jackson, featuring the OSU Gospel Voices choir for "Man in the Mirror". During the show, band members performed individual moonwalks, and also created an image of Michael Jackson performing a Moonwalk across the field, complete with sequined glove. This tribute has been seen on YouTube by over 8 million people, and was featured on many television programs and newspapers. The performance even attracted the attention of Katherine Jackson, Michael's mother. She was quoted as being very thankful and gracious for the band's performance of Michael's music.

With four days of preparation, the band performed a movie-themed halftime show at the October 26, 2012 game against Pennsylvania State University. This performance featured music from Superman, Harry Potter, Jurassic Park, and Pirates of the Caribbean. Formations performed included an imageof Superman righting and steadying a collapsing building, and Harry Potter on a broomstick chasing a Snitch during a game of Quidditch. To date, the performance has been viewed by over 21 million people on YouTube.

The 2014 marching band season was difficult for band members and staff alike, with an interim directing staff and the national spotlight being turned on the program in a negative light due to the release of a report by the University claiming a "sexualized" culture. The band took to the field in Baltimore for the season opener against the United States Naval Academy. This condensed show featured much more traditional military-band style symmetrical drill that emphasized precision. The band also created an image of soldiers marching with a Civil War regimental flag. The band also played the Navy service song and formed a floating anchor, a formation first performed by the OSUMB in 1934, also at a game versus the Naval Academy in Baltimore. This show ended with a double Script Ohio. The show was well received by fans from both schools and was featured in national headlines for being the first performance of the band since the termination of their director.

For the first home game of 2014, the band performed a tribute to classic television shows titled "TV Land, Too!", with music from Dragnet, The Simpsons, The Addams Family, M*A*S*H, I Dream of Jeannie, The Office, Game of Thrones, Hawaii Five-O, The Brady Bunch, and The Lone Ranger. Drill selections included Bart Simpson on a skateboard, Thing waving to the audience, a helicopter blowing up a Michigan Block M, a costumed Jeannie appearing from her magic bottle, costumed Brady Bunch characters in their trademark squares, a fire-breathing dragon, and the Lone Ranger's horse Silver galloping across the field. The show instantly went viral, drawing praise from TV Land and actor Tom Hanks.

The second home game featured the annual Alumni Reunion. The largest turnout of band alumni to date prompted the band staff to feature both bands on the field for a substantial portion of the show. The show theme was D-Day, celebrating the 70th anniversary of the U.S. invasion of Normandy. Selections included "This is My Country", "American Patrol", a medley of military service songs, and "America the Beautiful". The band formed an animation of the famous image of a sailor kissing a woman in New York City upon returning home from the war, an army tank, ship anchor, the planting of the American flag on Iwo Jima, a classic twin engine bomber aircraft, and a coast guard boat. The nearly 800 band alumni framed the current band during most of their formations. This show also received national acclaim, particularly for its proximity to the anniversary of the September 11, 2001 terrorist attacks.

Later that year, the band would perform at the first College Football Playoff National Championship, with Ohio State defeating Oregon 42-20.

In 2018, the band represented the state of Ohio in the Macy's Thanksgiving Day Parade.

The band has also appeared in the Rose Parade and at the Rose Bowl Game 16 times, with its most recent appearance in 2025.
