= Script Ohio =

Musical drill from Ohio State University

- Status: Active
- Genre: Musical performance
- Country: United States
- Inaugurated: October 10, 1936

Script Ohio is a musical drill performed by the Ohio State University Marching Band during pregame celebrations at Ohio State University American football games. The first instance of a standing script Ohio formation on the field was made by the University of Michigan. The intricate moving and marching formation that is seen today, however, was created by The Ohio State University Marching Band. It has been credited as the earliest example of "moving script writing" by a marching band and has been variously described as "one of college football's most iconic, longstanding traditions" and among "the most impressive examples of American folk art in existence". The maneuver is performed to the Robert Planquette march "Le Régiment de Sambre et Meuse".

== Maneuver ==
An inverted view of Script Ohio performed in 2015

The entire Script Ohio performance takes approximately 3.5 minutes to execute and, traditionally, is the second drill performed in the Ohio State University Marching Band's pregame show. The Ohio State University Marching Band has described the drill:

The band first forms a triple-Block O formation, then slowly unwinds to form the famous letters while playing Robert Planquette's "Le Régiment de Sambre et Meuse". The drum major leads the outside O into a peel-off movement around the curves of the script, with every musician in continual motion. Slowly the three blocks unfold into a long singular line which loops around, creating the OSUMB's trademark.

With approximately 20 measures to go in the song, the drum major and a fourth- or fifth-year sousaphone player high-five each other. At the 15-measure mark, following the complete formation of the word "Ohio", the drum major and sousaphone player high-kick or "strut" off from the main ranks of the band to the top of the letter "i". The drum major points to the top of the "i", and the sousaphone player stops there, thereby "dotting" it. Before playing a solo (if a solo is to be played), the strut ends with a 24-count "hats off bow". Under normal execution when done by the entire band, this bow has a set of verbal commands to be screamed while executing it, namely "[halt], kick, down-2, hats-2, off-2-3-4, down-2-3-4, up-2-3-4, on-2, down-2, O-HI-O". This climax of the i-dotting drill, though, is usually performed on-count to one side of the stadium (facing up away from the script) and more slowly/artistically to the other side of the stadium (facing down towards the script). The band then marks time in position while singing "Buckeye Battle Cry" to the accompaniment of the lone sousaphone player who has "dotted the i".

The "i" being "dotted" before a 2016 game against the University of Nebraska

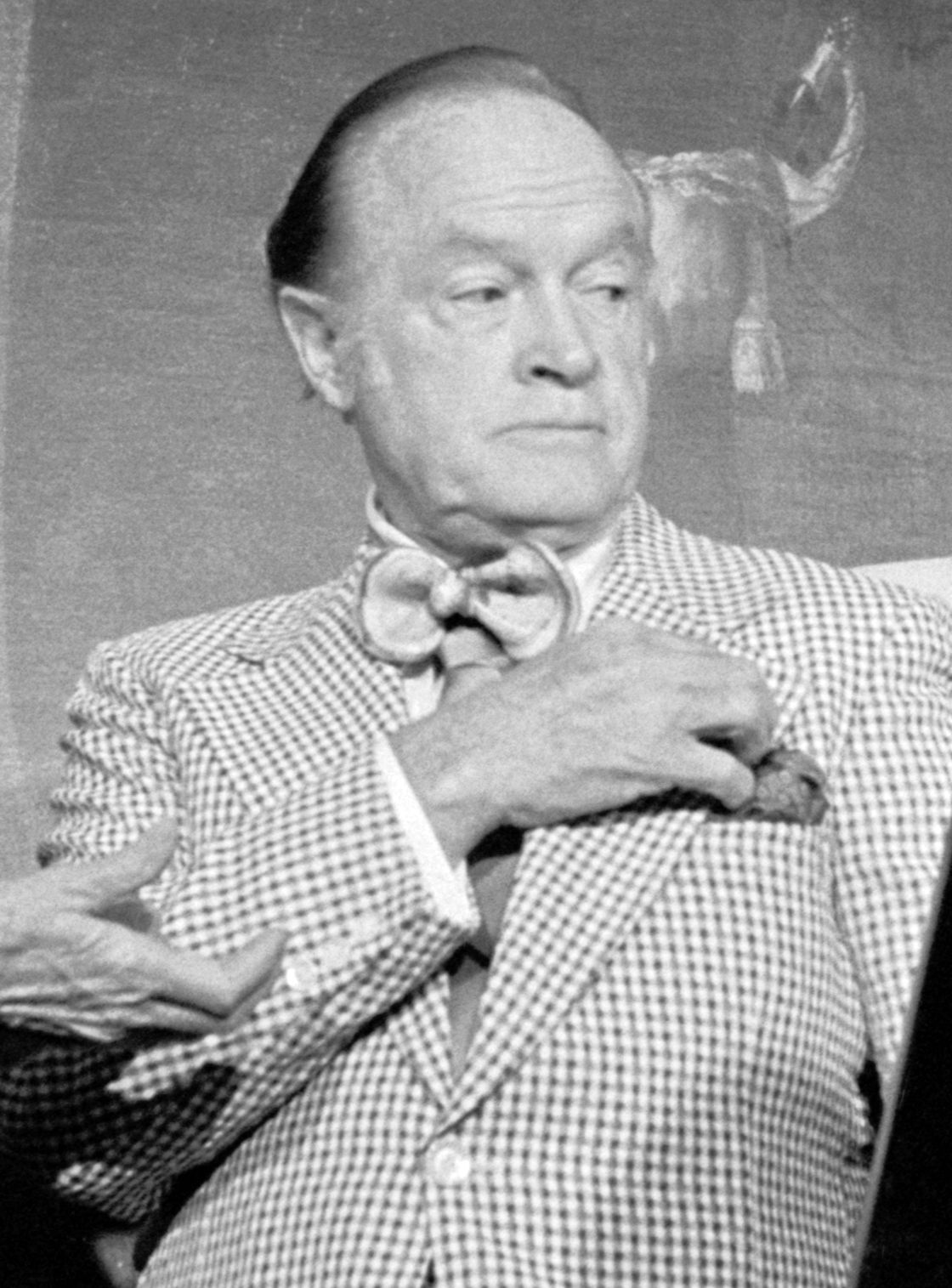
Bob Hope (pictured) was an honorary "i dotter".

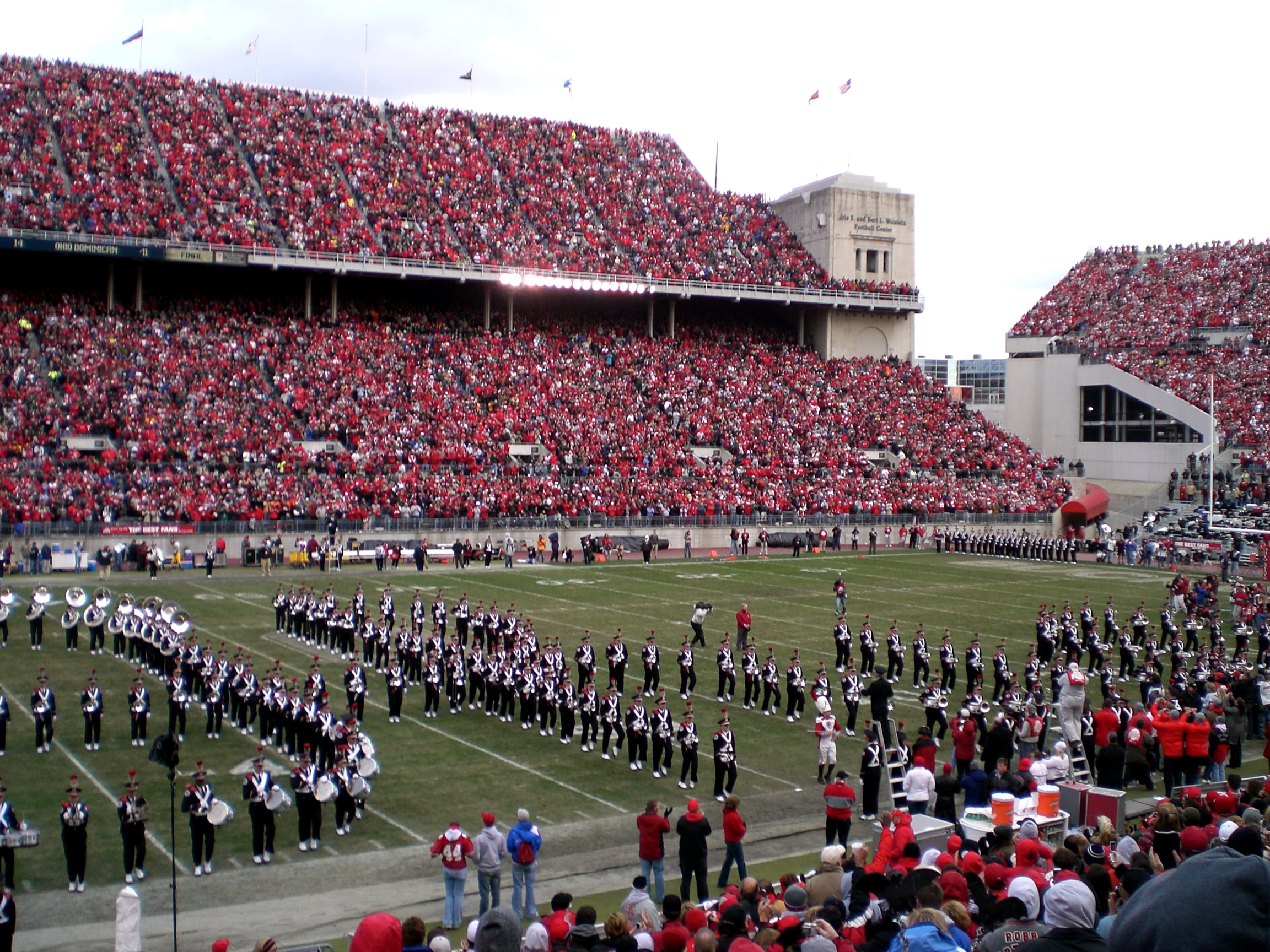
Jack Nicklaus is pictured here in 2006 serving as an honorary "i dotter".

== History ==
=== Origins ===
An "Ohio" formation in cursive script was first performed by the University of Michigan Marching Band during a 1932 football game between that school and Ohio State University. This version, however, saw the band move directly into the word as opposed to maneuvering in a floating formation as would later become associated with Script Ohio.

On October 10, 1936, the Ohio State University Marching Band first performed the Script Ohio maneuver during a game at Ohio Stadium between Ohio State University and the University of Pittsburgh.

Eugene Weigel, the band's director, charted the formation and was reportedly influenced by the design of the word "Ohio" in the marquee of the Loew's Ohio Theatre in Columbus, Ohio. During this time position charts had yet to be developed to guide marching band maneuvers and the band's drum major led the band through the formation as a practical necessity, rather than for ceremonial effect as would be the case later.

Though the tradition of "dotting the i" would later be assigned to sousaphone players, the first person to "dot the i" was John W. Brungart, a trumpet player from Coshocton, Ohio. In a 2025 ESPN interview, current band director Christopher Hoch noted that the first dotter was "an afterthought", adding,

It was an E-flat cornet player -- the smallest instrument in the band. The next time they did the Script Ohio, the band director at the time decided, 'We need something that's a little bit more visible, a little bit more flashy.' So, they went from the smallest instrument in the band to the largest instrument. You can clearly see that giant sousaphone bell every time the i dotter struts to the top of the i now.

The year following its introduction, the Associated Press credited Script Ohio as the first instance of a marching band executing moving script writing and Weigel reported receiving almost daily inquiries from directors of other marching band asking "how to devise letter tricks". By 1939 "Script Ohio" had become the band's "most popular formation".

=== Later history ===
At a 1966 game against Texas Christian University a "dual" Script Ohio was first performed by combining the personnel of both the Ohio State University Marching Band and Ohio State's alumni band to form two of the formations on-field simultaneously, with one facing either side of the stadium. Four Script Ohios were simultaneously performed for the first time in 1977 at a game against the University of Miami.

In 2015, Mike Hudoba—then a doctoral candidate at the Ohio State University College of Engineering—formed DNA strands into Script Ohio as a demonstration of a newly discovered technique developed by Ohio State scientists to recreate DNA bonds into specific shapes as a method of delivering medicine to specific cells in the human body. The DNA Script Ohio, which took more than two years to create, was subsequently inducted into Guinness World Records as the "smallest logo ever made".

A unique milestone in the tradition of "dotting the I" took place during the band's performance at halftime of the Buckeyes' 2025 game against Minnesota. Sydney Reeves became the first child of two people who had dotted the I to also do so.

=== Honorary "i-dotters" ===
Serving as an honorary "i dotter" has been called by former Michigan coach Jim Harbaugh "the most beloved honor an Ohio State man or woman may receive". Former Ohio State football coach Earle Bruce's appearance as an honorary "i dotter" was included in his obituary. Other honorary "i dotters" include Buster Douglas, Bob Hope, Jack Nicklaus, Gordon Gee, and Woody Hayes.

== Trademark ==
A graphic representation of Script Ohio is used as one of several branding devices by Ohio State University. The university registered a trademark on this device and has previously sued companies infringing on it through the production of unlicensed clothing and apparel. The university has also trademarked the phrase "Script Ohio".

== Reception ==
Described as a "famous" drill by USA Today and the Washington Post, Script Ohio was named "one of college football's most iconic, longstanding traditions" by Sports Illustrated, while Columbus Dispatch sports columnist Bob Hunter has remarked that he had "never spoken with a fan who had just attended his first Ohio State football game who didn't mention it as a highlight, if not the highlight of his day". Writing in Rolling Stone in 2016, John B. Thompson called Script Ohio "one of the most impressive examples of American folk art in existence".
