= Le Régiment de Sambre et Meuse =

1870 march composed by Robert Planquette

- March by Robert Planquette
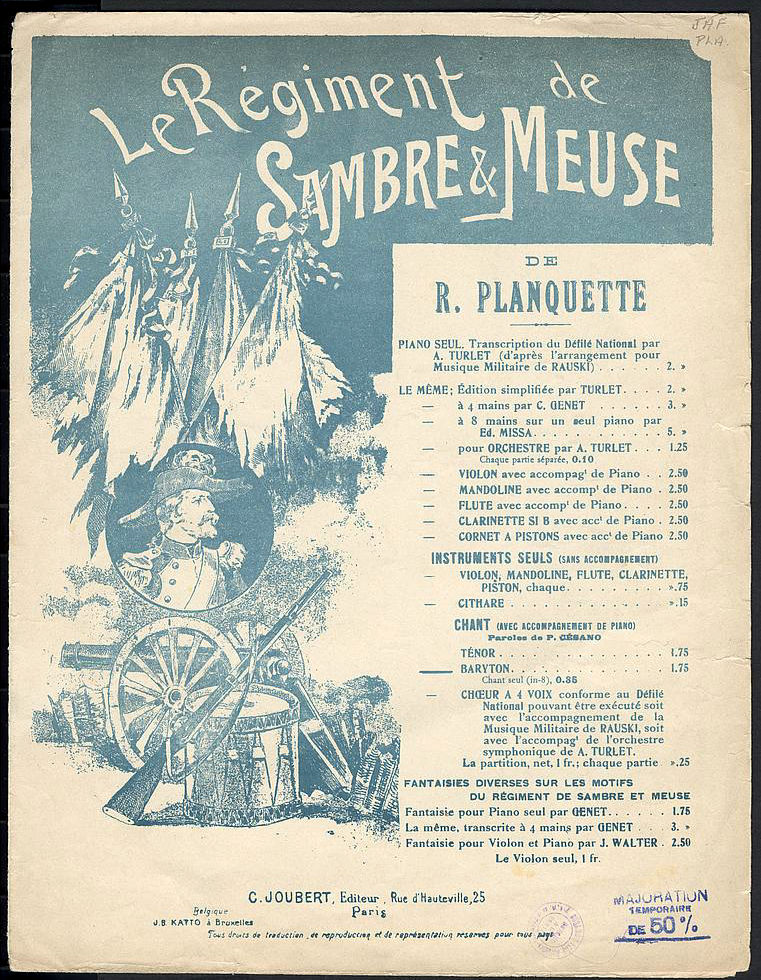
- Sheet music cover
- English: "The Regiment of the Sambre and Meuse"
- Text: by Paul Cezano
- Language: French

Premiere
- Date: March 3, 1870
- Location: Paris
- Performers: Lucien Fugère

"Le Régiment de Sambre et Meuse" (English: "Sambre-et-Meuse Regiment") is a French poem by Paul Cézano set to music by Robert Planquette and arranged and expanded into a military march by Joseph-François Rauski.

== Background ==
Cezano penned the lyrics to "Le Régiment de Sambre et Meuse" following the French defeat in the Franco-Prussian War, Planquette setting them to music shortly thereafter. Cezano was one of a number of French artists of the period who sought to reconcile the defeat of France with memories of its historic victories, with the song describing the achievement of human immortality through heroic death.

"Le Régiment de Sambre et Meuse" performed by the Ohio State University Marching Band before a 2016 American football game against Nebraska, followed by the singing of Buckeye Battle Cry.

1905 recording of "Le Régiment de Sambre et Meuse" sung by Pierre d'Assy

It was first publicly performed by the baritone Lucien Fugère in a Paris cabaret on 3 March 1870. Quickly finding favor as a popular song, it became a part of the music curriculum in schools during the French Third Republic, and was used at other important moments in French history during the late 19th and early 20th centuries. It was performed to accompany Alfred Dreyfus' degradation ceremony of 1895 and, during the First World War, to accompany the execution of traitors, though it later fell out of favor.

In 1879, a French army chef de musique Rauski changed Cézano's original melody into a pas redoublé and made significant additions. (Note: In a letter to the editor of the la Petite Gironde, Rauski claimed that, "...sur 179 mesures que compte le pas redoublé, 118 ont été composées et orchestrées par moi." ("...out of 179 measures that make up the pas redoublé, 118 were composed and orchestrated by me.")) This march became internationally popular in the late 19th and early 20th centuries and Rauski was widely assumed to have been the original composer. In the United States, the march is sometimes called the "French National Defilé March" (Note: "French National Defilé March" was originally a subtitle of American printings of the march.) and misattributed to French composer Arthur Turlet (who had composed a piano and orchestra arrangement of the piece).

=== Use outside France ===
Since 1936, The Ohio State University Marching Band in the United States has performed "Le Régiment de Sambre et Meuse" as part of its pregame show during the Script Ohio formation. It is also a staple of the repertoire of the West Point Band, where it is known by the name "French National Defilé".

"Le Régiment de Sambre et Meuse" is often used for marches of the Belgian military schools in Brussels (KMS) and Sint-Truiden (KSOO) because of the historic link of this song with Belgium. In the most southern part of the Netherlands, the march is played often because of the historic link of this region with Belgium. We can also notify the use of this music in Marches of Entre-Sambre-et-Meuse.

"Le Régiment de Sambre et Meuse" is also used for the marchpast piece of the 1st Infantry Regiment Grenadiers Platoon of Chilean Army and the Air Force Academy of Bolivia. It is used as a marching song during the training of cadets and aspiring officers of the Brazilian Military Police in some states. The march is also used in the Mexican Naval Academy (Heroica Escuela Naval Militar) for drill instructions and parades on special visits. It was the regimental march of the Royal 22nd Regiment of the Canadian Army until 1939.

=== Use in fiction ===
In Robert Heinlein's Starship Troopers, the character Sergeant Zim leads his soldiers in the singing of "oldies ... like Le Régiment de Sambre et Meuse and Caissons".

== Lyrics ==
French	English
1er couplet: Tous ces fiers enfants de la Gaule Allaient sans trêve et sans repos Avec leur fusil sur l'épaule Courage au cœur et sac au dos La gloire était leur nourriture Ils étaient sans pain, sans souliers La nuit, ils couchaient sur la dure Avec leur sac pour oreiller Refrain: Le régiment de Sambre et Meuse Marchait toujours au cri de "Liberté" Cherchant la route glorieuse Qui l'a conduit à l'immortalité 2e couplet: Pour nous battre, ils étaient cent mille Et à leur tête, ils avaient des rois. Le général, vieillard débile, Faiblit pour la première fois, Voyant certaine la défaite, Il réunit tous ses soldats. Puis il fit battre la retraite Mais eux ne l'écoutèrent pas. Refrain: Le régiment de Sambre et Meuse Marchait toujours au cri de "Liberté" Cherchant la route glorieuse Qui l'a conduit à l'immortalité 3e couplet: Le choc fut semblable à la foudre Ce fut un combat de géants Ivres de gloire, ivres de poudre, Pour mourir, ils serraient les rangs Le régiment, sous la mitraille Était assailli de partout Pourtant, la vivante muraille Impassible, tenait debout Refrain: Le régiment de Sambre et Meuse Marchait toujours au cri de "Liberté" Cherchant la route glorieuse Qui l'a conduit à l'immortalité 4e couplet: Le nombre eut raison du courage Un soldat restait le dernier Il se défendit avec rage Mais bientôt fut fait prisonnier En voyant ce héros farouche L'ennemi pleura sur son sort Le héros prit une cartouche Jura puis se donna la mort Refrain: Le Régiment de Sambre et Meuse Reçut la mort au cri de «Liberté» Mais son histoire glorieuse Lui donne droit à l'immortalité.	1st verse: All these proud children of Gaul Marched without respite or ease With their rifles on their shoulders Courage in their hearts and packs on their backs Glory was their nourishment With neither bread nor shoes They slept on the hard ground With their packs beneath their heads. Chorus: The regiment of "Sambre et Meuse" Always marched to the call of freedom Seeking the path of glory That led them to immortality 2nd verse: To fight us, there were a hundred thousand, And at their head, they had kings. The general, a feeble old man, Faltered for the first time, Seeing defeat as certain, He gathered all his soldiers. Then he ordered the retreat, But they did not listen to him. Chorus: The regiment of "Sambre et Meuse" Always marched to the call of freedom Seeking the path of glory That led it to immortality 3rd verse: The clash was like lightning, It was a battle of giants. Drunken with glory, drunk with powder, To die, they tightened the ranks. The regiment, under the gunfire, Was attacked from every side. Yet, the living wall, Impassive, stood tall. Chorus: The regiment of "Sambre et Meuse" Always marched to the call of freedom Seeking the path of glory That led it to immortality 4th verse: The number prevailed over courage, One soldier remained the last. He defended himself with rage, But soon he was taken captive. Seeing this fierce hero, The enemy wept for his fate. The hero took a cartridge, Swore, and then took his own life. Chorus: The Regiment of Sambre and Meuse Received death with the cry of 'Liberty' But its glorious history Grants it the right to immortality.
