= Buckeye Battle Cry =

Fight song of the Ohio State Buckeyes

"Buckeye Battle Cry", composed by vaudeville performer and songwriter Frank Crumit, is one of two fight songs of the Ohio State Buckeyes, with the other being "(Fight The Team) Across the Field". Every football game in Ohio Stadium begins with Ramp entrance by The Ohio State University Marching Band, performed to "Buckeye Battle Cry". The tradition of Script Ohio ends with the singing of one chorus of the fight song by band members. The song is also played after every Buckeye score.

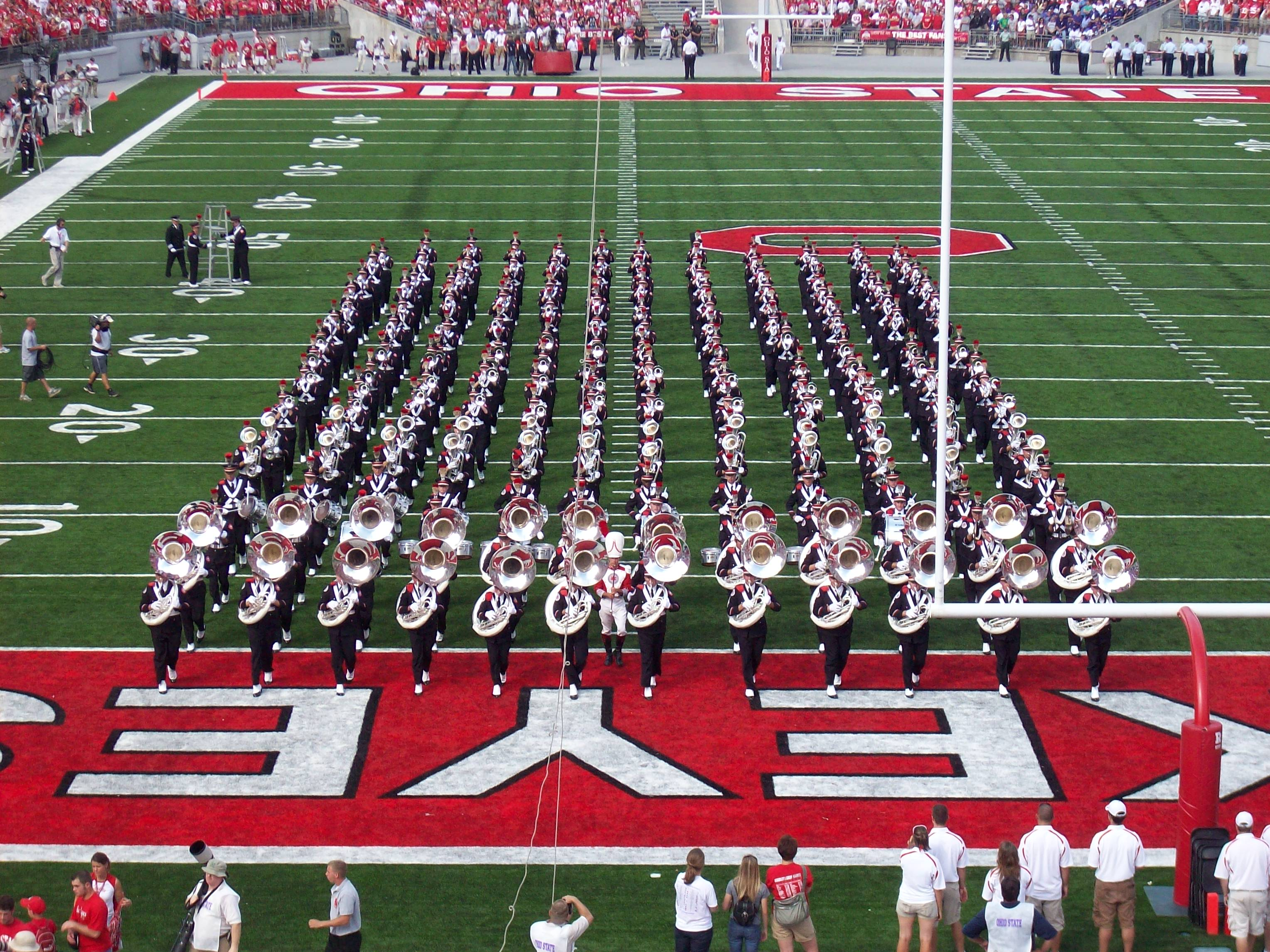
The Ohio State University Marching Band

Planning for the construction of Ohio Stadium resulted in a contest in 1919 to create new school fight songs. Frank Crumit, an alumnus of Ohio University but a Buckeye fan, wrote "Buckeye Battle Cry" and submitted it to the contest.

Some older versions of the lyrics show not COME ON OHIO!, but rather O-HI-O. While some fans sing O-HI-O (complete with arm motions), the former is more common. The Ohio State University Marching Band sings "Come On Ohio" in their rendition. The Marching Band ramp entrance consists of the verse, followed by two repetitions of the chorus.

== Lyrics ==
In old Ohio there's a team
That's known throughout the land
Eleven warriors brave and bold
Whose fame will ever stand

And when that ball goes over,
Our cheers will reach the sky
Ohio Field will hear again
The Buckeye Battle Cry!

Chorus:

Drive, drive on down that field
Men of the Scarlet and Gray
Don't let them through that line
We've got to win this game today

COME ON OHIO!

Smash through to victory
We cheer you as we go
Our honor defend
We will fight to the end

For O-HI-O!

== Sources ==
- OSU Fight Songs
- Songs of Ohio State University
