= Across the Field =

Fight song of Ohio State University

"(Fight The Team) Across the Field" is the older of two fight songs of Ohio State University, with the newer one being "Buckeye Battle Cry". Although the lyrics reference football heroics and was composed by the football team's varsity manager, William A. Dougherty, Jr., the song is used by Buckeye teams of all sports. The song first appeared before the October 16, 1915, game against Illinois.
