= List of Big Ten Conference national championships =

The list of Big Ten national championships includes championships won by teams from the Big Ten Conference and former member Chicago. Including football champions listed in the official NCAA Records book, Big Ten teams have compiled 303 NCAA and Football Bowl Subdivision national championships (as of January 9, 2024) during their years of membership. Prior to NCAA sponsorship of women's sports, Big Ten teams, as members of the AIAW, also won 6 undisputed national championships in 1976–82. Notably, in the 2021–22 academic year, Big Ten members won four titles: (1) Northwestern won the NCAA field hockey championship. It is the first for Northwestern in field hockey and the first for the Big Ten since 2001 when Michigan won the title; (2) Wisconsin won the NCAA women's volleyball championship marking the first title for the Badgers in the sport. Wisconsin becomes the third Big Ten school to win in women's volleyball, joining Penn State and Nebraska. It also is the first for the conference since Nebraska won the title in 2017; (3) Penn State won the wrestling championship continuing the Big Ten's championship streak since 2007. Penn State has won nine of the last eleven men's wrestling titles and tenth overall and (4) Ohio State won the NCAA women's ice hockey championship for the first time in the school's history and only the second NCAA women's sport where the Buckeyes have won a title, joining women's rowing. The title continues the streak of a Big Ten team winning the women's ice hockey title as Wisconsin won the prior two championships.

Listed below are all championship teams of NCAA-sponsored events, as well as the titles won in football, which has a Division I championship not sanctioned by the NCAA. The main list in Sections 2, 3 and 4 includes championships won by Chicago when it was a member but does not credit a Big Ten NCAA championship to current Big Ten member schools before they joined the conference. These prior titles are separately indicated.

- Michigan State joined in 1950 and competed in the conference for the first time in 1953.
- Penn State joined in 1990 and competed in the conference for the first time in 1991.
- Nebraska joined in 2011.
- Rutgers and Maryland joined in 2014. Johns Hopkins joined in 2014 for men's lacrosse and began play in spring 2015.
- Oregon, UCLA, USC, and Washington joined the conference in 2025.

== Teams ==
Institution	Location	Founded	Joined conference	Nickname	Varsity teams	NCAA championships as a conference member only (updated March 25, 2024)†
University of California, Los Angeles	Los Angeles, California	1919	2025	Bruins	25	1
University of Illinois	Urbana–Champaign, Illinois	1867	1896	Fighting Illini	21	22 (4 in football)
Indiana University	Bloomington, Indiana	1820	1899 (Athletics 1900)	Hoosiers	24	24
University of Iowa	Iowa City, Iowa	1847	1899 (Athletics 1900)	Hawkeyes	24	28 (3 in football)
University of Maryland	College Park, Maryland	1856	2014	Terrapins	20	6
University of Michigan	Ann Arbor, Michigan	1817	1896 (Inactive 1907–1916)	Wolverines	27	51 (14 in football)
Michigan State University	East Lansing, Michigan	1858	1950 (Athletics 1953)	Spartans	25	18 (2 in football)
University of Minnesota	Minneapolis–Saint Paul, Minnesota	1851	1896	Golden Gophers	25	26 (7 in football)
University of Nebraska	Lincoln, Nebraska	1869	2011	Cornhuskers	21	4
Northwestern University	Evanston, Illinois	1851	1896	Wildcats	19	13
Ohio State University	Columbus, Ohio	1870	1912	Buckeyes	36	42 (10 in football)
University of Oregon	Eugene, Oregon	1872	2025	Ducks	18	1
Pennsylvania State University	University Park, Pennsylvania	1855	1990 (Athletics 1991)	Nittany Lions and Lady Lions	30	36
Purdue University	West Lafayette, Indiana	1869	1896	Purdue Boilermakers	18	4 (1 in football)
Rutgers University	New Brunswick–Piscataway, New Jersey	1766	2014	Scarlet Knights	27	0
University of Southern California	Los Angeles, California	1880	2025	Trojans	23	2
University of Washington	Seattle, Washington	1861	2025	Huskies	22	1
University of Wisconsin	Madison, Wisconsin	1848	1896	Badgers	23	35 (1 in football)
Associate Members	Location	Founded	Joined Conference	Nickname	Current Varsity Teams	NCAA Championships as a member†
Johns Hopkins University	Baltimore, Maryland	1876	2014	Blue Jays	2 Big Ten (22 others)	0
University of Notre Dame	Notre Dame, Indiana	1842	2017	Fighting Irish	1 Big Ten (22 others)	0
Former Member	Location	Founded	Joined Conference	Nickname	Current Varsity Teams	NCAA Championships as a member†
University of Chicago	Chicago, Illinois	1890	1896	Maroons	19	3 (2 in football)

† Includes football national championships by Big Ten members starting in 1901, as listed in the official NCAA Football Bowl Subdivision Records book

=== Most recent NCAA championship ===
Team	Academic Year	Sport
Illinois	2011–12	Men's Gymnastics
Indiana	2025–26	Football
Iowa	2020–21	Men's Wrestling
Maryland	2021–22	Men's Lacrosse
Michigan	2025–26	Men's Basketball
Michigan State	2014–15	Women's Cross Country
Minnesota	2015–16	Women's Ice Hockey
Nebraska	2020–21	Women's Bowling
Northwestern	2025–26	Women's Lacrosse
Ohio State	2024–25	Football
Oregon	2024–25	Women's Indoor Track
Penn State	2025–26	Men's Wrestling
Purdue	2009–10	Women's Golf
Rutgers	1948–49	Men's Fencing (tie)
UCLA*	2025–26	Beach volleyball
USC	2025–26	Women’s Water Polo
Washington	2025–26	Men's Soccer
Wisconsin	2025–26	Women's Ice Hockey

* Most recent NCAA championship won by a member of the conference

== Fall NCAA sports ==
=== Men's cross country (12) ===
Prior to joining the Big Ten, Michigan State won four and Penn State won three NCAA titles in men's cross country. (7 NCAA before Big Ten)

Year	School
1938	Indiana
1940	Indiana
1942	Indiana†
1955	Michigan State
1956	Michigan State
1958	Michigan State
1959	Michigan State
1982	Wisconsin
1985	Wisconsin
1988	Wisconsin
2005	Wisconsin
2011	Wisconsin

† Co-champion with Penn State

=== Women's cross country (3) ===
Year	School
1984	Wisconsin
1985	Wisconsin
2014	Michigan State

=== Field hockey (5) ===
Prior to joining the Big Ten, Maryland won 8 NCAA titles and Penn State won 2 AIAW national titles in Field Hockey. (8 NCAA before Big Ten)

Year	School
1986	Iowa
2001	Michigan
2021	Northwestern
2024	Northwestern
2025	Northwestern

=== Football (46) ===
The Division I (FBS) football championship is not officially bestowed by the NCAA; however, the Big Ten teams among the champions and co-champions listed in its official NCAA Football Bowl Subdivision Records book are shown below. Prior to joining the Big Ten, Nebraska won 3 football national titles and 2 co-titles, Penn State won 2 national titles, Maryland won one national title, and Michigan State won one championship (1952, the year before it began Big Ten competition). The NCAA was formed in 1906 to address violent injuries in the sport.

Year	National Champion(s)†
1901	Michigan & 2 others
1902	Michigan & 1 other
1903	Michigan & 1 other
1904	Michigan, Minnesota & 1 other
1905	Chicago & 1 other
1913	Chicago & 2 others
1914	Illinois & 2 others
1918	Michigan & 1 other
1919	Illinois & 4 others
1921	Iowa & 5 others
1922	Iowa & 4 others
1923	Illinois, Michigan & 2 others
1925	Michigan & 2 others
1926	Michigan & 4 others
1927	Illinois & 4 others
1931	Purdue & 2 others
1932	Michigan & 2 others
1933	Michigan, Ohio State & 2 others
1934	Minnesota & 1 other
1935	Minnesota & 4 others
1936	Minnesota & 2 others
1940	Minnesota & 2 others
1941	Minnesota & 2 others
1942	Ohio State, Wisconsin & 1 other
1944	Ohio State & 1 other
1947	Michigan & 1 other
1948	Michigan
1954	Ohio State & 1 other
1957	Ohio State & 1 other
1958	Iowa & 1 other
1960	Minnesota & 1 other
1961	Ohio State & 1 other
1965	Michigan State & 1 other
1966	Michigan State & 1 other
1968	Ohio State
1970	Ohio State & 2 others
1997	Michigan & 1 other
2002	Ohio State
2014	Ohio State
2023	Michigan
2024	Ohio State
2025	Indiana

† As listed in official NCAA Football Bowl Subdivision Records. For 1950 to present, includes only recognized consensus selections (AP, UP-UPI-USAT, FWAA, NFF)

=== Men's soccer (13) ===
Prior to joining the Big Ten, Maryland won 3 NCAA titles in Men's Soccer (1968 [tie], 2005, 2008) and Penn State won 6 national titles awarded by the ISFA in the era before NCAA championships.

Year	School
1967	Michigan State†
1968	Michigan State‡
1982	Indiana
1983	Indiana
1988	Indiana
1995	Wisconsin
1998	Indiana
1999	Indiana
2003	Indiana
2004	Indiana
2012	Indiana
2018	Maryland
2025	Washington

† Co-champion with Saint Louis (game called because of weather)

‡ Co-champion with Maryland (game ended in tie)

=== Women's soccer (1) ===
Year	School
2015	Penn State

=== Women's volleyball (11) ===
Prior to joining the Big Ten, Nebraska won 3 NCAA titles in women's volleyball. (3 NCAA before Big Ten)

Year	School
1999	Penn State
2007	Penn State
2008	Penn State
2009	Penn State
2010	Penn State
2013	Penn State
2014	Penn State
2015	Nebraska
2017	Nebraska
2021	Wisconsin
2024	Penn State

== Winter NCAA sports ==
=== Men's basketball (11) ===
Prior to joining the Big Ten, Maryland won 1 NCAA title in men's basketball (2002). (1 NCAA before Big Ten)

The NCAA championship tournament began in 1939.

Year	School
1902	Minnesota†
1907	Chicago†
1908	Chicago†
1909	Chicago†
1912	Wisconsin†
1914	Wisconsin†
1915	Illinois†
1916	Wisconsin†
1919	Minnesota†
1931	Northwestern†
1932	Purdue†
1940	Indiana
1941	Wisconsin
1953	Indiana
1960	Ohio State
1976	Indiana
1979	Michigan State
1981	Indiana
1987	Indiana
1989	Michigan
2000	Michigan State
2026	Michigan

† Selected by Helms Athletic Foundation, formed in 1936, who compiled a retroactive list of college basketball champions in 1942 for the previous 41 years. In 12 of those years, a Big Ten team was selected: 1902, 1907–09, 1912, 1914–16, 1919, 1931–32, 1941. Chicago's 1908 national title was won in a championship series against the University of Pennsylvania.

=== Women's basketball (2) ===
Prior to joining the Big Ten, Rutgers won 1 AIAW championship (1982), and Maryland won 1 NCAA title in women's basketball (2006). (1 NCAA before Big Ten)

Year	School
1999	Purdue
2026	UCLA

=== Men's gymnastics (25) ===
Prior to joining the Big Ten, Penn State won 9 NCAA titles in men's gymnastics, and Nebraska won 8 NCAA titles. (17 NCAA before Big Ten)

Year	School
1938	Chicago
1939	Illinois
1940	Illinois
1941	Illinois
1942	Illinois
1950	Illinois
1955	Illinois
1956	Illinois
1958	Illinois & Michigan State
1963	Michigan
1969	Iowa
1970	Michigan
1984	Ohio State
1989	Illinois
1996	Ohio State
1999	Michigan
2000	Penn State
2001	Ohio State
2004	Penn State
2007	Penn State
2010	Michigan
2012	Illinois
2013	Michigan
2014	Michigan
2025	Michigan

Trampoline (2)

Until 1969, trampoline was one of the events that comprised the NCAA men's gymnastics championships. At that time, the event was removed in order to conform to the international gymnastics itinerary. The NCAA continued to bestow a national title in trampoline for two years.

Year	School
1969	Michigan
1970	Michigan

=== Women's gymnastics (1) ===
Prior to joining the Big Ten, and prior to the NCAA sponsored championship, Penn State won 2 AIAW national championships.

Year	School
2021	Michigan

=== Men's ice hockey (23) ===
Men's ice hockey became an official Big Ten sport in the 2013–14 season.

Year	School
1948	Michigan
1951	Michigan
1952	Michigan
1953	Michigan
1955	Michigan
1956	Michigan
1964	Michigan
1966	Michigan State
1973	Wisconsin
1974	Minnesota
1976	Minnesota
1977	Wisconsin
1979	Minnesota
1981	Wisconsin
1983	Wisconsin
1986	Michigan State
1990	Wisconsin
1996	Michigan
1998	Michigan
2002	Minnesota
2003	Minnesota
2006	Wisconsin
2007	Michigan State

=== Men's swimming and diving (29) ===
Year	School
1924	Northwestern†
1927	Michigan†
1928	Michigan†
1929	Northwestern†
1930	Northwestern†
1931	Michigan†
1932	Michigan†
1933	Northwestern†
1934	Michigan†
1935	Michigan†
1936	Michigan†
1937	Michigan
1938	Michigan
1939	Michigan
1940	Michigan
1941	Michigan
1943	Ohio State
1945	Ohio State
1946	Ohio State
1947	Ohio State
1948	Michigan
1949	Ohio State
1950	Ohio State
1952	Ohio State
1954	Ohio State
1955	Ohio State
1956	Ohio State
1957	Michigan
1958	Michigan
1959	Michigan
1961	Michigan
1962	Ohio State
1968	Indiana
1969	Indiana
1970	Indiana
1971	Indiana
1972	Indiana
1973	Indiana
1995	Michigan
2013	Michigan

† From inception in 1924 through 1936, NCAA team swimming championships were unofficial because team points were not officially awarded. Team champions were nevertheless proclaimed in the newspapers of the time.

=== Men's indoor track & field (2) ===
Year	School
2007	Wisconsin
2025	USC

=== Women's indoor track & field (1) ===
Prior to joining the Big Ten, Nebraska in 1982–1984 won 1 AIAW and 2 NCAA indoor women's track and field titles. (2 NCAA before Big Ten)

Year	School
2025	Oregon

=== Men's wrestling (43) ===
Prior to joining the Big Ten, Penn State won one NCAA title in men's wrestling. (1 NCAA before Big Ten)

Year	School
1932	Indiana^{†}
1967	Michigan State
1975	Iowa
1976	Iowa
1978	Iowa
1979	Iowa
1980	Iowa
1981	Iowa
1982	Iowa
1983	Iowa
1984	Iowa
1985	Iowa
1986	Iowa
1991	Iowa
1992	Iowa
1993	Iowa
1995	Iowa
1996	Iowa
1997	Iowa
1998	Iowa
1999	Iowa
2000	Iowa
2001	Minnesota
2002	Minnesota
2007	Minnesota
2008	Iowa
2009	Iowa
2010	Iowa
2011	Penn State
2012	Penn State
2013	Penn State
2014	Penn State
2015	Ohio State
2016	Penn State
2017	Penn State
2018	Penn State
2019	Penn State
2021	Iowa
2022	Penn State
2023	Penn State
2024	Penn State
2025	Penn State
2026	Penn State

† In 1928 and from 1931 to 1933, an NCAA team championship was not awarded because team scoring was unofficial.

== Spring NCAA sports ==
=== Baseball (6) ===
Year	School
1953	Michigan
1956	Minnesota
1960	Minnesota
1962	Michigan
1964	Minnesota
1966	Ohio State

=== Men's golf (4) ===
Prior to the NCAA sponsored championship, Michigan won 2 national titles.

Year	School
1934	Michigan°
1935	Michigan°
1945	Ohio State
1961	Purdue
1979	Ohio State
2002	Minnesota

° NIGA national champion

=== Women's golf (2) ===
Year	School
2010	Purdue
2025	Northwestern

=== Men's lacrosse (2) ===
Men's lacrosse became an official Big Ten sport in the 2015 season.

Prior to joining the Big Ten as a men's lacrosse affiliate, Johns Hopkins won 35 national titles in the era before the NCAA organized men's lacrosse championships, plus nine NCAA titles. Maryland has nine pre-NCAA national titles and two NCAA titles. (11 NCAA before Big Ten)

The NCAA did not organize national championships in men's lacrosse until the 1971 season. Before that time, other bodies awarded national titles based on regular season records, most notably the United States Intercollegiate Lacrosse Association. Rutgers shared two national titles, in 1928 and 1955 (a Division II co-championship).

Year	School
2017	Maryland
2022	Maryland

=== Women's lacrosse (12) ===
Women's lacrosse became an official Big Ten sport in the 2015 season.

Prior to joining the Big Ten, Maryland won 11 NCAA titles and Penn State won 2 NCAA titles in women's lacrosse. (13 NCAA before Big Ten)

Prior to the NCAA sponsored championship, Penn State won 3 national titles and Maryland won 1 AIAW national title.

Year	School
2005	Northwestern
2006	Northwestern
2007	Northwestern
2008	Northwestern
2009	Northwestern
2011	Northwestern
2012	Northwestern
2015	Maryland
2017	Maryland
2019	Maryland
2023	Northwestern
2026	Northwestern

=== Women's rowing (3) ===
Prior to the NCAA sponsored championship, Wisconsin won 5 national titles.

Year	School
1975	Wisconsin†
1976	Wisconsin†
1977	Wisconsin†
1978	Wisconsin†
1986	Wisconsin†
2013	Ohio State
2014	Ohio State
2015	Ohio State

† NWRA College Eights Champion

=== Softball (1) ===
Prior to the NCAA sponsored championship, Michigan State won 1 national title.

Year	School
1976	Michigan State†
2005	Michigan

† AIAW National Champion

=== Men's tennis (2) ===
Year	School
1957	Michigan
2003	Illinois

=== Women's tennis (0) ===
At the same time that the first NCAA Division I women's tennis championship was held (attracting the top-ranked teams), the AIAW conducted its last tennis championship, which was won by Indiana.

Year	School
1982	Indiana†

† AIAW National Champion

=== Men's outdoor track & field (10) ===
Year	School
1921	Illinois
1923	Michigan
1927	Illinois†
1929	Ohio State
1932	Indiana
1944	Illinois
1946	Illinois
1947	Illinois
1948	Minnesota
2025	USC

† From 1925 through 1927, the NCAA team championship was unofficial because team points were not officially scored.

== National championships in sports not sponsored by the Big Ten ==
In addition to the national championship titles won in Big Ten sponsored sports, some Big Ten schools participate in official varsity sports not offered by the NCAA (e.g., men's rowing, synchronized swimming) as well as other NCAA sports for which no Big Ten championship is contested. These include bowling, fencing, women's ice hockey, rifle, men's volleyball, and men's and women's water polo, as well as men's ice hockey before the 2013–14 school year plus men's and women's lacrosse before the 2014–15 school year. The following are Big Ten teams' national championships won in other sports (number in parentheses indicates NCAA titles won by Big Ten schools during their years of membership):

=== Boxing (10) ===
Penn State won 1 NCAA title in boxing before the NCAA discontinued the sport. (1 NCAA before Big Ten)

Year	School
1939	Wisconsin†
1942	Wisconsin†
1943	Wisconsin†
1947	Wisconsin†
1948	Wisconsin
1951	Michigan State
1952	Wisconsin
1954	Wisconsin
1955	Michigan State
1956	Wisconsin

† Before 1948, NCAA team boxing championships were unofficial because team points were not officially awarded. However, national publications at the time proclaimed the annual team champions, and the NCAA Record Books still count them as titles won for that year.

=== Women's bowling (3) ===
Prior to beginning athletic competition in the Big Ten, Nebraska won 5 WIBC/USBC titles, Penn State won 1 WIBC/USBC title, and Nebraska won 3 NCAA titles in bowling. (3 NCAA before Big Ten)

Year	School
2013	Nebraska
2015	Nebraska
2021	Nebraska

=== Co-ed fencing (14) ===
Prior to beginning athletic competition in the Big Ten, Penn State won 2 NCAA titles in co-ed fencing. (2 NCAA before Big Ten)

Year	School
1995	Penn State
1996	Penn State
1997	Penn State
1998	Penn State
1999	Penn State
2000	Penn State
2002	Penn State
2004	Ohio State
2007	Penn State
2008	Ohio State
2009	Penn State
2010	Penn State
2012	Ohio State
2014	Penn State

=== Men's fencing (4) ===
Prior to joining the Big Ten, Rutgers won 1 NCAA co-championship in men's fencing. (1 NCAA before Big Ten)

Year	School
1941	Northwestern§
1942	Ohio State§
1956	Illinois
1958	Illinois

§ Prior to 1947, the Intercollegiate Fencing Association championship, held since 1894, was premiere. NYU won the 3-weapon title both of these years.

=== Women's fencing (0) ===
Prior to joining the Big Ten, Penn State won 1 NCAA title in women's fencing. (1 NCAA before Big Ten)

Prior to the NCAA sponsored championship, Penn State won 2 AIAW national championships.

=== Women's ice hockey (18) ===
Prior to the NCAA sponsored championship, Minnesota won 1 national title.

Year	School
2000	Minnesota†
2004	Minnesota
2005	Minnesota
2006	Wisconsin
2007	Wisconsin
2009	Wisconsin
2011	Wisconsin
2012	Minnesota
2013	Minnesota
2015	Minnesota
2016	Minnesota
2019	Wisconsin
2021	Wisconsin
2022	Ohio State
2023	Wisconsin
2024	Ohio State
2025	Wisconsin
2026	Wisconsin

† AWCHA National Champion (prior to NCAA sponsored championships)

=== Rifle (0) ===
Big Ten teams have not won an NCAA rifle championship since inception in 1980.

Year	School†
1911	Iowa
1918	Iowa
1929	Iowa
1933	Minnesota
1940	Iowa
1941	Minnesota
1946	Iowa

† NRA National Champion (prior to NCAA sponsored championships). Prior to joining the Big Ten, Maryland won 5 NRA national championships (4 men, 1 women), and Michigan State won 3 (men).

=== Men's rowing (0) ===
The NCAA has never offered a men's rowing championship.

Year	School†
1951	Wisconsin
1959	Wisconsin
1966	Wisconsin
1973	Wisconsin
1974	Wisconsin
1975	Wisconsin
1990	Wisconsin
2008	Wisconsin
2025	Washington

† Intercollegiate Rowing Association Varsity Eights Champion

=== Synchronized swimming (0) ===
The NCAA has never offered a synchronized swimming championship. However, the AIAW (women's predecessor to the NCAA) did.

Year	School†
1977	Ohio State
1978	Ohio State
1979	Ohio State
1980	Ohio State and 1 other
1982	Ohio State

† AIAW national champion

From 1983 through 2004, Ohio State won 19 of the 22 national championships sponsored by United States Synchronized Swimming. Ohio State also won championships from 2009 through 2012, and in 2015, 2017, 2018, 2019, 2022, and 2023.

=== Men's volleyball (5) ===
Year	School
1994	Penn State
2008	Penn State
2011	Ohio State
2016	Ohio State
2017	Ohio State

== See also ==
- List of NCAA schools with the most NCAA Division I championships
- List of NCAA schools with the most Division I national championships
- AIAW national championships
- List of NCAA schools with the most AIAW Division I national championships
