= Ohio State Buckeyes =

Intercollegiate sports teams of Ohio State University

- University: Ohio State University
- Nickname: Buckeyes
- NCAA: Division I (FBS)
- Conference: Big Ten (primary); WCHA (women's ice hockey); MIVA (men's volleyball); CCFC (fencing); Patriot Rifle Conference (rifle)
- Athletic director: Ross Bjork
- Location: Columbus, Ohio
- Varsity teams: 33 (15 men's, 16 women's, 2 co-ed)
- Football stadium: Ohio Stadium
- Basketball arena: Value City Arena
- Baseball stadium: Bill Davis Stadium
- Other venues: Covelli Center; Jesse Owens Memorial Stadium; The Ohio State University Ice Rink; St. John Arena
- Colors: Scarlet and gray
- Mascot: Brutus Buckeye
- Fight song: Buckeye Battle Cry
- Website: ohiostatebuckeyes.com
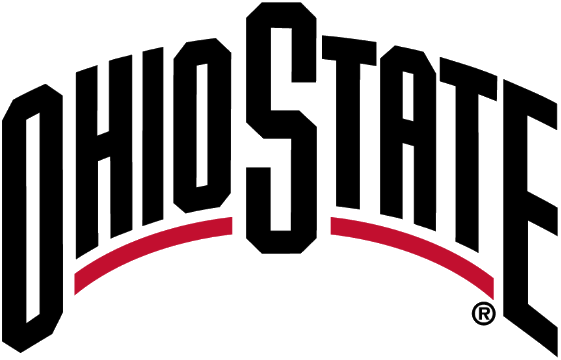

Big Ten logo in Ohio State's colors

The Ohio State Buckeyes are the intercollegiate athletic teams that represent Ohio State University, located in Columbus, Ohio. The athletic programs are named after the colloquial term for people from the state of Ohio and after the state tree, the Ohio buckeye. The Buckeyes participate in the National Collegiate Athletic Association's (NCAA) Division I and the Big Ten Conference in most sports. The Ohio State women's ice hockey team competes in the Western Collegiate Hockey Association (WCHA). The school colors are scarlet and gray. The university's mascot is Brutus Buckeye. "THE" is the official trademark of the Ohio State University merchandise. Led by its football program, the Buckeyes have the largest overall sports endowment of any campus in North America.

Ohio State is one of only seven universities to have won an NCAA national championship in baseball and men's basketball, and be recognized as a national champion in football. Ohio State has also won national championships in women's ice hockey, men's swimming & diving, men's outdoor track & field, men's volleyball, men's golf, men's gymnastics, men's fencing, women's rowing, co-ed fencing, co-ed and women's pistol, artistic swimming, and wrestling. Since the inception of the Athletic Director's Cup, Ohio State has finished in the top 25 each year, including top 6 finishes in three of the last five years. During the 2005–06 school year Ohio State became the first Big Ten team to win conference championships in football, men's basketball and women's basketball in the same season. This feat repeated in the 2006–07 season, which also included a February 25, 2007 men's basketball game which saw the Buckeyes defeat the Wisconsin Badgers in the Big Ten's first basketball game between the number one and number two ranked squads in the nation.

Some of the sports figures who were student athletes at Ohio State include Jesse Owens, "The Buckeye Bullet" (track and field); John Havlicek, Jerry Lucas, and Katie Smith (basketball); Frank Howard (baseball); Jack Nicklaus (golf); Archie Griffin (football running back, the only two-time Heisman Trophy winner); and Chic Harley (three-time All-American football running back). Hall of Fame coaches at Ohio State have included Paul Brown and Woody Hayes (football), Fred Taylor (men's basketball). Notable sports figures in Ohio State history may be inducted into the Ohio State Varsity O Hall of Fame.

The department was the center of the Ohio State University abuse scandal, where Dr. Richard Strauss, a team doctor for several of the Buckeyes athletic teams, sexually abused OSU athletes and students which amounted to 1,430 instances of fondling and 47 rapes per the University's findings. The events were documented in the film Surviving Ohio State.

== Sports sponsored ==
Men's sports	Women's sports
Baseball	Basketball
Basketball	Cross country
Cross country	Fencing
Fencing	Field hockey
Football	Golf
Golf	Gymnastics
Gymnastics	Ice hockey
Ice hockey	Lacrosse
Lacrosse	Rowing
Soccer	Soccer
Swimming and diving	Softball
Tennis	Swimming and diving
Track and field^{1}	Artistic swimming
Volleyball	Tennis
Wrestling	Track and field^{1}
	Volleyball
Co-ed sports
Pistol — Rifle
^{1} – includes both indoor and outdoor

=== Baseball ===
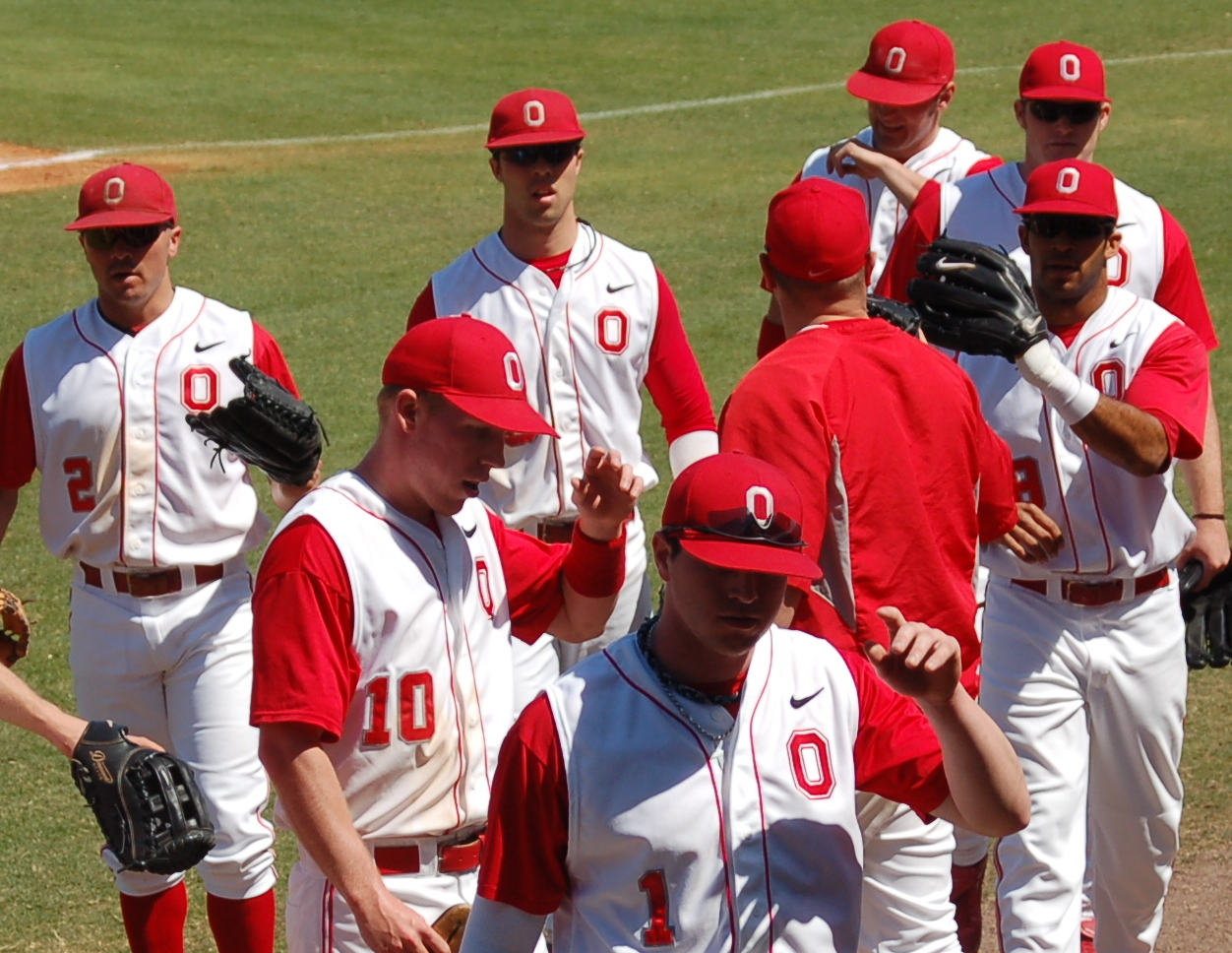
Buckeyes baseball players before a 2009 game

Ohio State has played baseball since 1881, winning a national championship in 1966 along with 16 Big Ten regular-season titles and eight Big Ten tournament titles. The Buckeyes baseball team was the first Ohio State sports team. The team is currently coached by Greg Beals and play their home games at Bill Davis Stadium, which opened in 1997. Going into the 2008 season the Buckeyes all-time record is 2228–1427–38. Notable alumni include Frank Howard, Nick Swisher and two-time All-American Steve Arlin.

=== Men's basketball ===
The Ohio State men's basketball team has played in 10 NCAA Final Fours, winning the championship in 1960, when they were led by Basketball Hall of Famers Jerry Lucas, John Havlicek, and Bob Knight off the bench. A Buckeye has been named first team All-American 23 times, including five two-time All-Americans and one three-time All-American. Between 1960 and 1964, Ohio State won five consecutive Big Ten championships, an achievement that has yet to be matched.

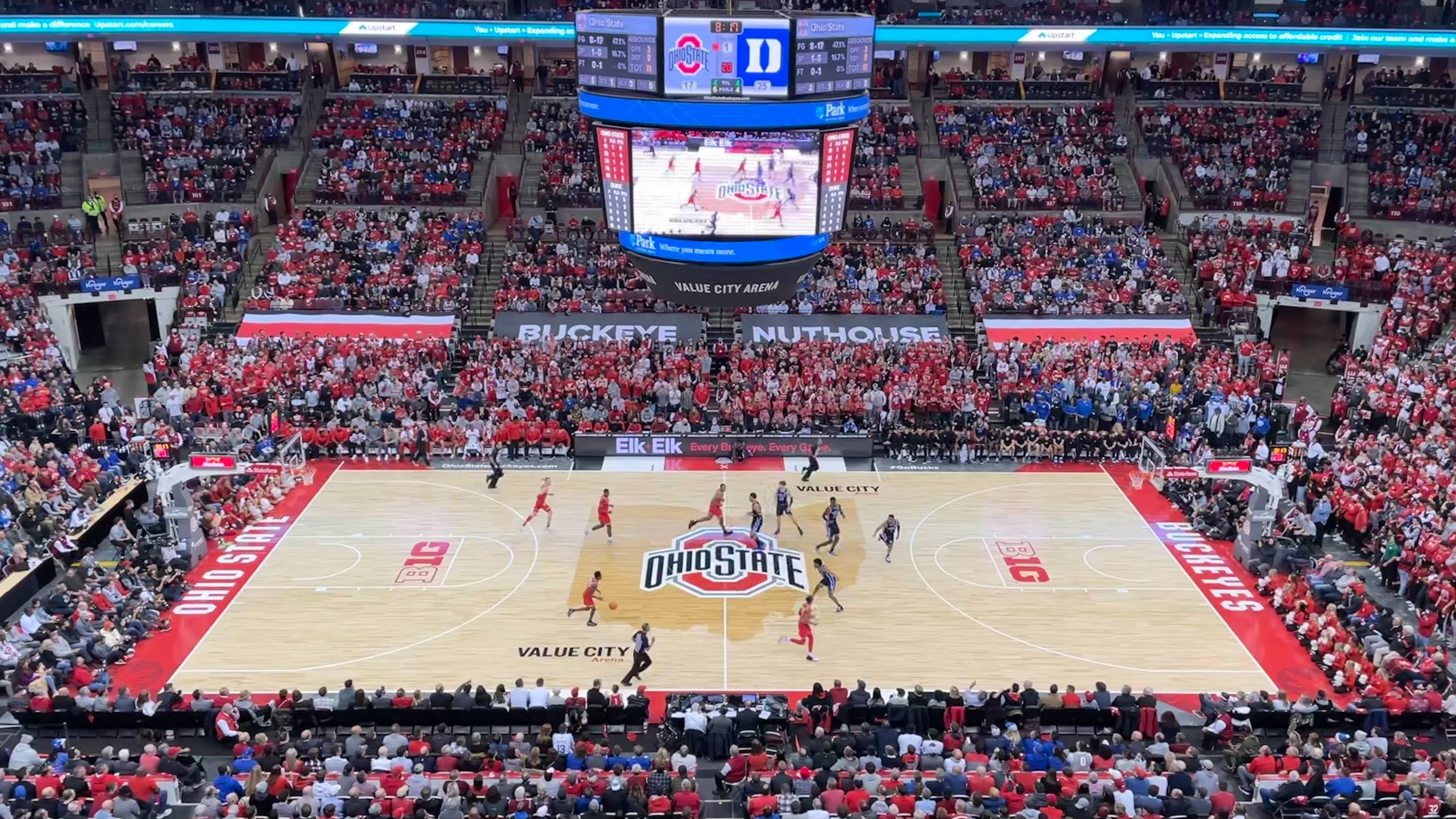
Ohio State Men's basketball game at Value City Arena in the Jerome Schottenstein Center

In 2004, Ohio State fired men's basketball coach Jim O'Brien for recruiting violations and self-imposed a one-year penalty, including a ban on post-season play and reduction of scholarships. In light of these University self-imposed penalties, the NCAA Division I Committee on infractions merely placed Ohio State on three years probation for the violations, and gave heavier penalties to Coach O'Brien and a former assistant coach. The lightness of this judgment was seen as encouragement for schools to be proactive in responding to violations. Nevertheless, O'Brien successfully sued Ohio State for improper termination. Thad Matta took over O'Brien's spot in 2004. Ohio State recruited such talents as Greg Oden, and Mike Conley Jr. to start the 2006–2007 year. The Buckeyes finished the season with a 27–3 record; won the Big Ten tournament, and earned a number 1 seed for the NCAA tournament. After a very close game with state rival Xavier, and a thrilling 20 point come from behind victory against the Tennessee Volunteers, the Buckeyes managed to hold off Georgetown Hoyas 67–60 to reach the Championship Game for the first time since 1962, which they lost to defending NCAA champions Florida Gators, 84–75. Following years saw continued success for the Buckeyes. They won the Big Ten Championship in both the 2009–2010 and 2010–2011 season, and reached the Final Four in 2011–2012 before losing to Kansas. The Buckeyes reached the Elite Eight in 2012–2013, losing to Wichita State. 2013–2014 and 2014–2015 both saw early exits from the NCAA tournament.

=== Women's basketball ===
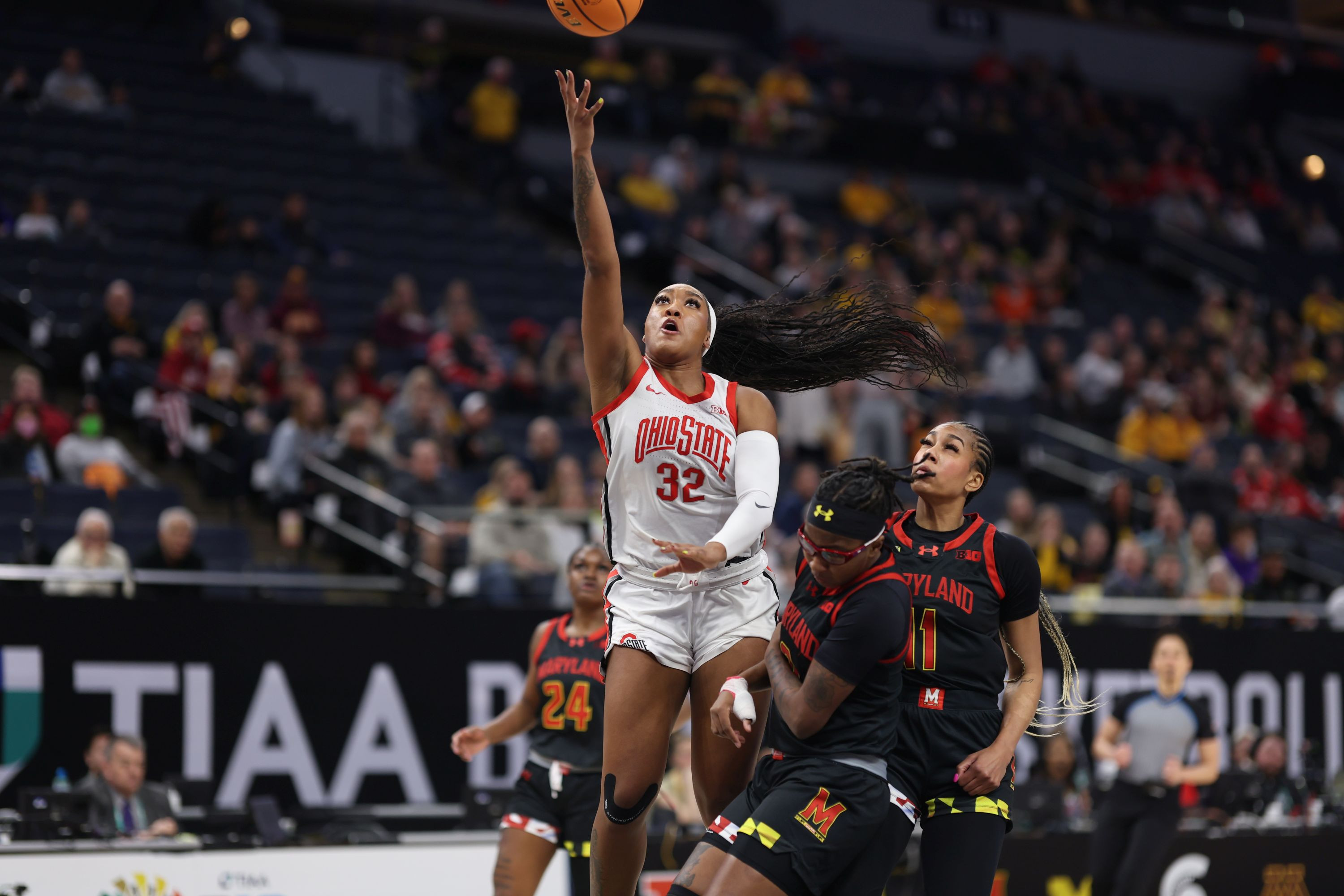
Ohio State (in white) v Maryland in March 2024

Currently coached by Kevin McGuff, the Ohio State women's basketball team plays its home games in the Value City Arena, which they moved into in 1998. Prior to 1998, they played at St. John Arena. They have won 10 Big Ten titles, which is the most in the conference and have 14 appearances in the NCAA tournament, the most recent being in 2016.

In 1993 they lost to the Texas Tech Lady Raiders 84–82 for the NCAA championship, while they captured the NIT championship in 2001, beating the New Mexico Lobos 62–61. Notable alumni include former All-Americans Katie Smith and Jessica Davenport.

=== Fencing ===
Ohio State won its first title in 1942, when the NCAA had only men's fencing. Ohio State won the NCAA championships in fencing in both men's and women's fencing, combined, in 2004, 2008 and 2012. Israeli Boaz Ellis won the NCAA title in men's foil in 2004, 2005 and 2006 for Ohio State, the first NCAA foil fencer to win three individual NCAA titles since 1963.

In April 2022, the NCAA Division I Committee on Infractions panel, upon the conclusion of an investigation, found that the fencing team's head coach Vladimir Nazlymov had violated NCAA head coach responsibility rules, and was guilty of aggravated level I violations. Further, he violated ethical conduct rules, by ignoring several requests that had been made to him to cooperate with the NCAA investigation. The panel found that:

"The head fencing coach violated fundamental, well-known bylaws. Worse, the head fencing coach received relevant education on the exact areas of the violations as they were occurring, but continued to commit the same violations and, in some circumstances, concealed them from compliance staff."

The NCAA said Nazlymov arranged, provided, or directed other coaches to give more than $6,000 in recruiting inducements to three fencers. Two of the prospects also received free meals and free private lessons from Nazylmov, which allowed OSU coaches to observe the fencers, and constituted impermissible tryouts, and received other inducements. It also found that under Nazlymov's direction, in addition 18 student fencers also received impermissible benefits worth over $8,000, resulting in them competing while ineligible.

The Ohio State fencing team was placed on four years of probation for NCAA violations committed between 2015 and 2019. In addition, the OSU athletic department was fined, and the OSU fencing program budget was reduced by 3%. The fencing program scholarship program was reduced by 10% for the 2022–23 academic year. Team wins and championships, and individual records for affected fencers, were vacated, including the 2016 and 2017 second-place finishes and a 2018 third-place finish in the NCAAs for the fencing team, and Midwest Fencing Conference championships in 2016, 2017, and 2018.

=== Football ===
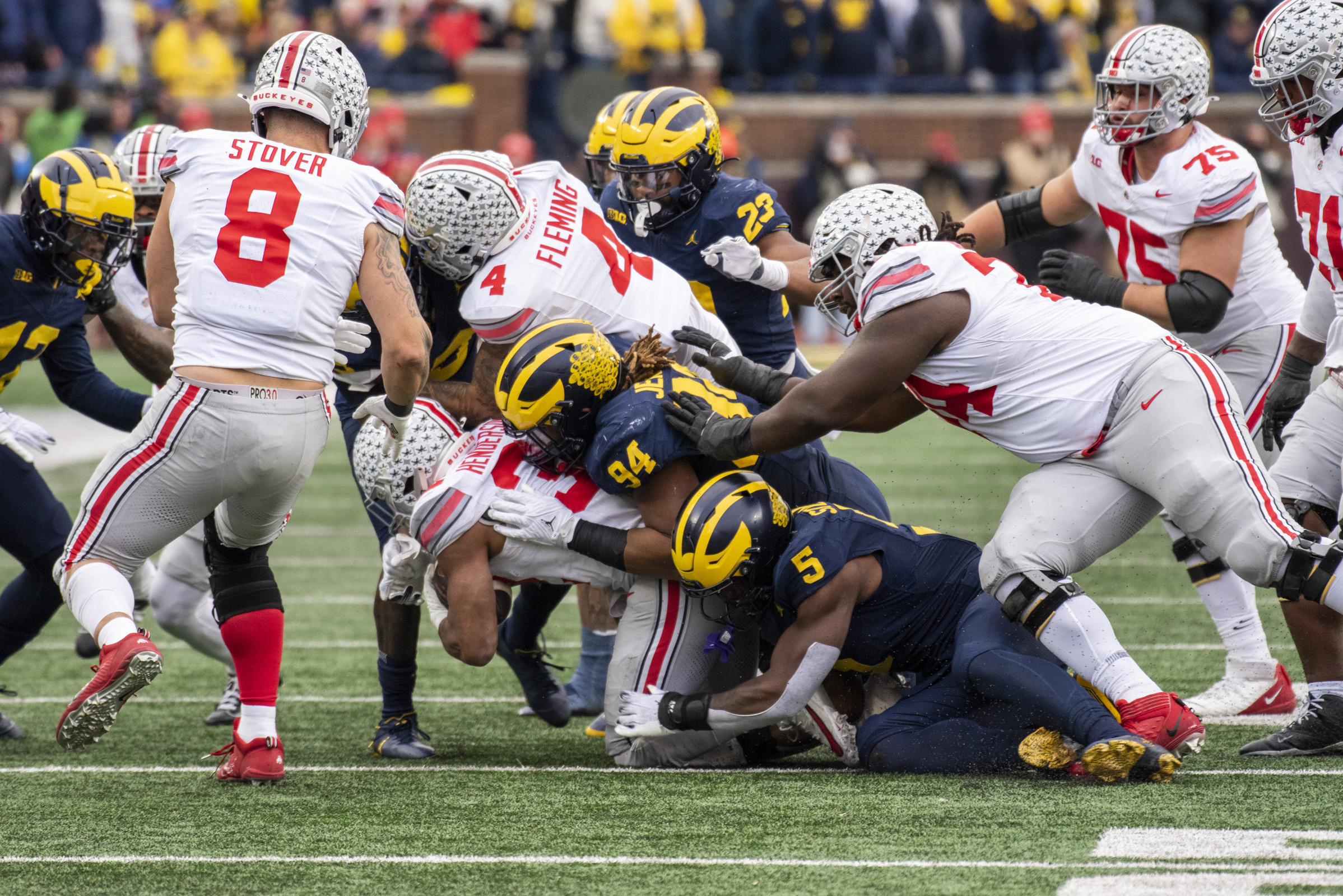
Ohio State v Michigan game in 2023

The Buckeyes are recognized by the university and NCAA as having won nine national championships, including seven from the major wire-service selectors: AP Poll and/or Coaches' Poll. The program has also captured 41 conference championships (2 OAC and 39 Big Ten), 10 division championships, and has compiled 10 undefeated seasons, including six perfect seasons (no losses or ties). Seven players have received the Heisman Trophy (second all-time), with the program holding the distinction of having the only two-time winner (Archie Griffin) of the award.

- 9× National Champions: 1942, 1954, 1957, 1961, 1968, 1970, 2002, 2014, 2024
  - 39× Big Ten Champions: 1916, 1917, 1920, 1935, 1939, 1942, 1944, 1949, 1954, 1955, 1957, 1961, 1968–1970, 1972–1977, 1979, 1981, 1984, 1986, 1993, 1996, 1998, 2002, 2005–2009, 2010 (vacated), 2014, 2017–2020
    - 2× Leaders Division champions: 2012, 2013
    - 8× East Division champions: 2014–2021
  - 2× OAC Champions: 1906, 1912

=== Golf ===
Ohio State's two golf courses, the Scarlet and the Gray, were completed in 1938. The Scarlet was designed by architect Alister MacKenzie, who designed the Masters course at Augusta National. However, his original design was not implemented fully, and the greens were the only part of the course that truly resembled his designs. Golf magazines annually rate the Scarlet Course as one of the top collegiate courses in the nation. The Scarlet recently underwent a $4.2 million renovation under the supervision of Jack Nicklaus. Ohio State has won the NCAA Division I Men's Golf Championships in 1945 and 1979. Five times, Buckeye men have won the NCAA golf individual championship: John Lorms in 1945, Tom Nieporte in 1951, Robert Jones in 1956, Jack Nicklaus in 1961 and Clark Burroughs in 1985. They have won 23 Big Ten Conference championships. In 1952, Mary Ann Villega won the women's individual intercollegiate golf championship on her home course (an event conducted by the Division of Girls' and Women's Sports (DGWS)—which later evolved into the current NCAA women's golf championship). Ohio State was host to the first eight women's individual national title tournaments.

=== Men's gymnastics ===
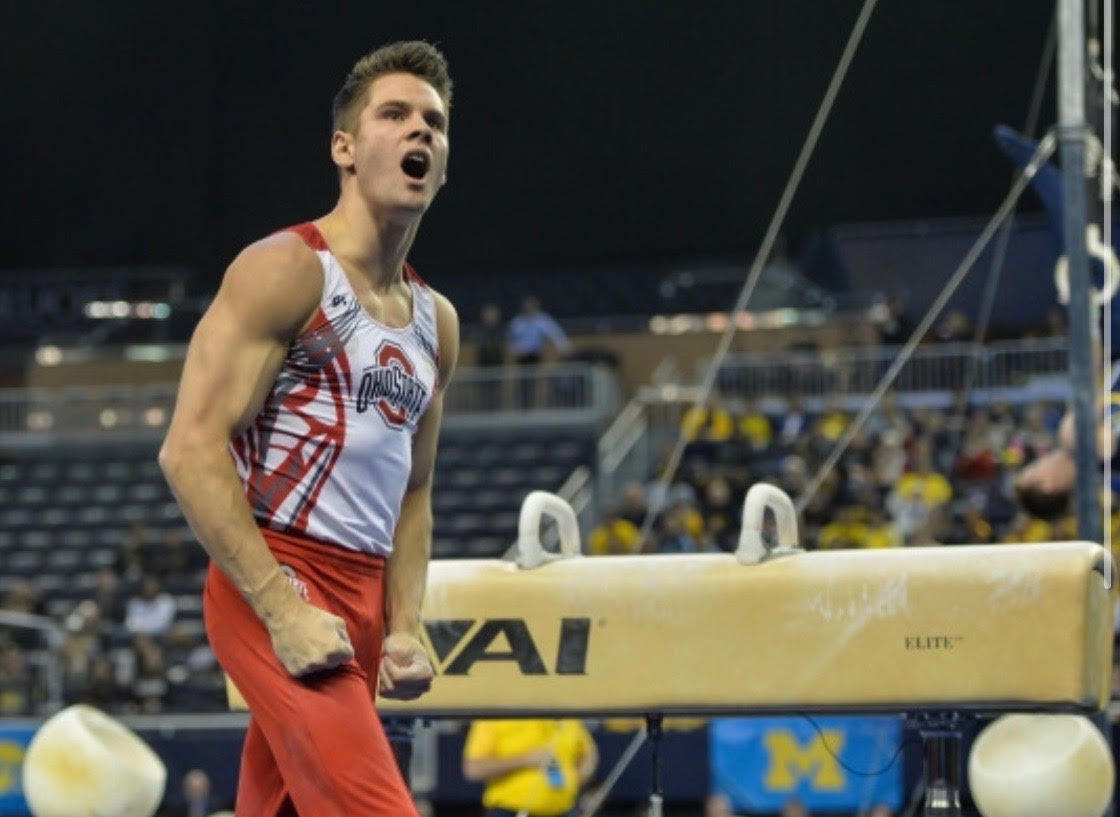
Alec Yoder in 2018

The Ohio State gymnastics team has won three national titles and fifteen Big Ten titles, and has produced 5 Nissen Award winners (The Heisman Trophy of Men's Gymnastics). The team is currently coached by Rustam Sharipov. The Buckeyes have all their competitions at the Covelli Center in Columbus, Ohio.

Some of the more notable Buckeye alumni include Don Perry, the first OSU All-American in the sport (Trampoline – 1954 – 4th place), brothers Seth and Noah Riskin – co-national champions (Parallel Bars – 1985 – 1st place), and Mike Racanelli – Ohio State's first Nissen winner in 1990. Racanelli also went on to win Gymnastic's first Ohio State Male Athlete of the Year Award that same year, given out annually to the athlete who displays the best performance in his sport (regardless of grade).

Following later in Racanelli's footsteps were other Nissen winners Kip Simons (1994), Blaine Wilson (1997) and Jamie Natalie (2001). Blaine Wilson (1995, 1996, 1997) and Jamie Natalie (2000, 2001) also went on to win Ohio State Male Athlete of the Year. Raj Bhavsar was the only other Men's Gymnast to win Ohio State Athlete of the Year which he accomplished in 2002.

On the Olympic and World Championship stage, OSU Men's Gymnastics is well represented, by gymnasts and coaches. The Olympian list includes: Miles Avery (asst coach 1996, 2000, 2004, 2008), Peter Kormann (Athlete in 1976, Head Coach 1996, 2000), Raj Bhavsar (2004, 2008), Jamie Natalie (2000), Gil Pinto (1988), Kip Simons (1994), Blaine Wilson (1996, 2000, 2004) and Alec Yoder (2020).

Two gymnasts who trained at the Ohio State facilities under coach Miles Avery, but were not NCAA Athletes due to eligibility rules, were Paul and Morgan Hamm – twin brothers from Wisconsin. Paul later went on to win the first ever Olympic gold medal in the Men's Gymnastics All-Around competition for the United States.

In 2011, Senior co-captain, Brandon Wynn, won his second national championship on rings. Brandon Wynn, Ty Echard, Kris Done and Jeff Treleaven earned All-America honors. In all, the seven All-America honors tie the second-best single-season performance in program history and are the most laurels since the 2005 campaign.

=== Ice hockey ===
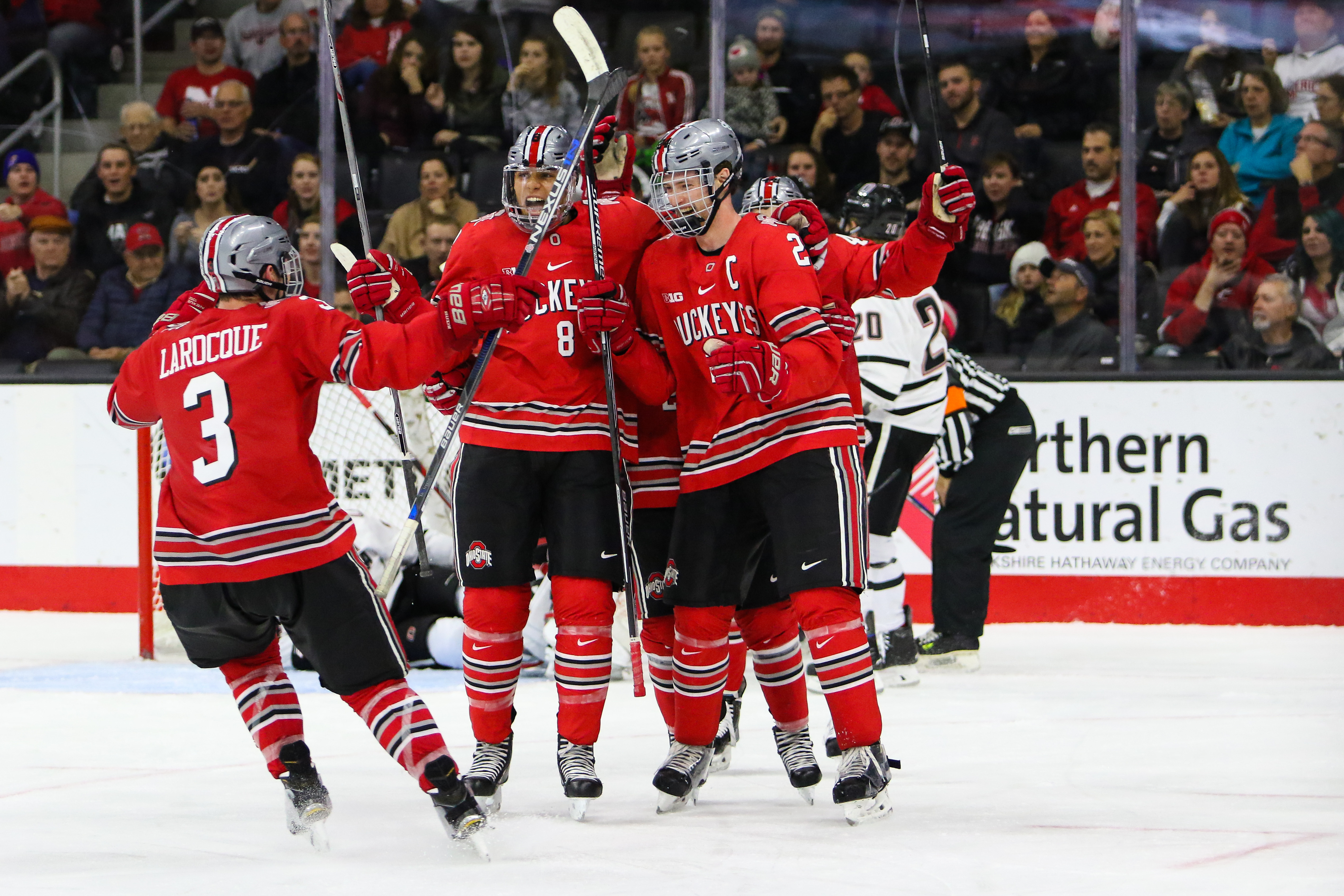
Buckeyes men's ice hockey players celebrate a goal during a game in 2015.

The Ohio State men's ice hockey team was established in 1961 and played at the Ohio State Ice Rink until 1999, when they moved into Value City Arena. The Buckeyes competed in the Central Collegiate Hockey Association (CCHA) through the 2012–2013 season. After Penn State added men's ice hockey as a Division I sport in 2012, the Big Ten had enough teams to sponsor its own hockey conference and began play in the 2013–2014 season.

The Buckeyes won one conference championship in 1972, the first year of the CCHA, and won the conference tournament in 1974 and 2004. The Buckeyes have made it to the NCAA tournament in 1997, 1998, 1999, 2003, 2004, 2005, and 2009, and went to the semi-finals in 1998. In 2006, they retired Paul Pooley's #22, the only number to be retired by the hockey program to date.

The Ohio State women's ice hockey team was started in 1999 and competes in the Western Collegiate Hockey Association (WCHA). The Buckeyes have three NCAA postseason appearances, 2018, 2020, and 2022. In their first, the Buckeyes made it to the Frozen Four before being beaten by the Clarkson Golden Knights. They received an autobid to the tournament in 2020 after winning the conference tournament for the first time before COVID-19 cancelled the NCAA tournament. In the 2022 Frozen Four, the Buckeyes defeated the Yale Bulldogs to advance to their first national championship. In the national championship, the Buckeyes defeated the Minnesota-Duluth Bulldogs by a score of 3–2 to win their first ever national championship. Notable Buckeye alumni include Olympians Emma Laaksonen, Tessa Bonhomme, and Lisa Chesson.

=== Rifle ===
In June, 2013, Ohio State became a charter member of the Patriot Rifle Conference. It was also announced that the Buckeyes will host the inaugural PRC championship meet on February 8 & 9, 2014. The rifle team has made four team and multiple individual appearances at the NCAA Rifle Championship, with their highest finish being third place in 1991.

=== Softball ===
The Buckeye softball team has appeared in one Women's College World Series in 1982. They shared the 1990 Big Ten regular season title and won the 2007 season title outright along with the 2007 Big Ten Conference softball tournament.

=== Artistic swimming ===
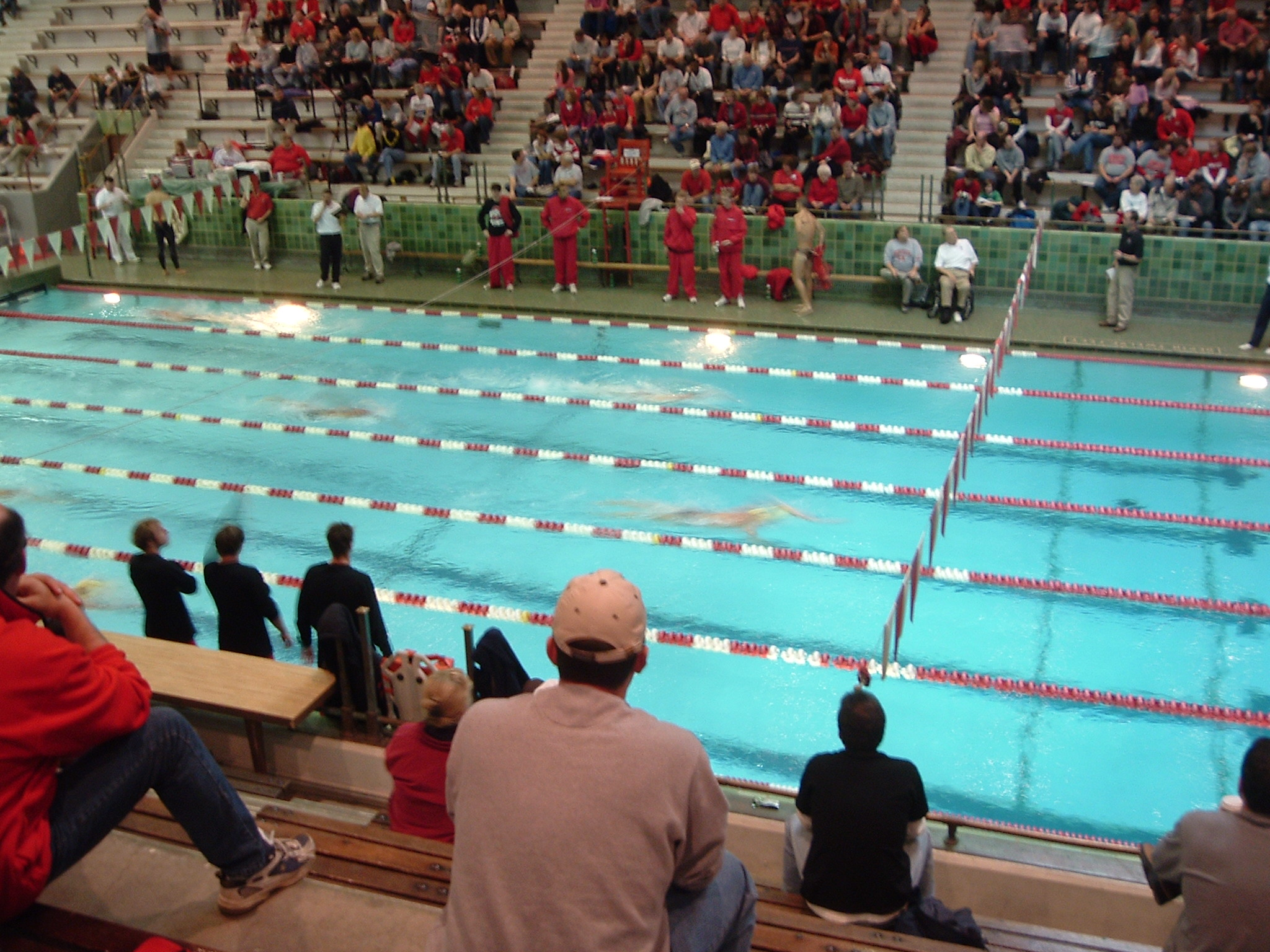
Ohio State pool

Ohio State artistic swimming has won 32 collegiate team championships between 1977, the first year of the collegiate national championships, and 2019. Head coach Mary Jo Ruggieri led the team to 17 wins between 1977 and 1995, and Linda Lichter-Witter added at least seven more since 1996. Ohio State also has taken at least 61 individual honors in that span, including 11 by Karen and Sarah Josephson. Head Coach Holly Vargo-Brown led the team to their 32nd total championship in 2019, the most of any Ohio State varsity sport.

=== Tennis ===
The Men's and Women's Varsity Tennis teams have shown success both individually and as a team. Both the men's and women's teams share the outdoor tennis facility, the Stickney Tennis Center, dedicated in 1993. When the weather takes them indoors, both teams play at the Varsity Tennis Center, which was recently completed in November 2007. The outdoor facility has 12 courts and the indoor has six courts and are both located in Columbus, Ohio.

Men's Tennis – 23 Big Ten Championships – 1915 (co-champions), 1943, 1991, 2001, 2006–2019, 2021–2025 NCAA Men's Tennis Tournament Team Appearances (since 1977) – 2000, 2001, 2002, 2003, 2004, 2005, 2006, 2007, 2008, 2009, 2010, 2011, 2012, 2013 The Men's tennis team has 23 NCAA Singles Appearances, 11 NCAA Doubles Appearances and eight All-Americans.

Women's Tennis – Big Ten Championships – 1974–1979 – Note: The Big Ten officially began sponsoring championships for women with the 1981–82 season. Since then, Ohio State has yet to win a Big Ten Championship. Ohio State recently won their first Big Ten Championship in school history in 2016, after defeating Michigan in the finals. NCAA Women's Tennis Tournament Team Appearances – 1996, 1999, 2000, 2001, 2002, 2003, 2004, 2008, 2009. The Women have five NCAA Singles Appearances, four NCAA Doubles Appearances and two All-Americans.

=== Wrestling ===
Ohio State wrestling was established at the university in 1921. Formerly the coach of Hofstra University for 11 years, the current Head Coach of the team is Tom Ryan. He has been coaching Ohio State since the 2006–2007 wrestling season. His coaching ability led the Buckeye Wrestling team to 3 Big Ten titles, an NCAA title in 2015 and 5 NCAA runners-up finishes. The team has a practice facility named The Jennings Center and competes on campus in Covelli Arena. Two-time NCAA wrestling champion Jeffrey Jaggers, or commonly referred to as J Jaggers, made a seamless transition from student-athlete to coach in 2009–10 as the volunteer assistant coach. Mark Coleman was a former Buckeye wrestler and a 1988 Big Ten Conference Champion & NCAA Champion Wrestler (190 lbs). Coleman a silver medalist in the 1991 FILA Wrestling World Championships, went on to become the first ever UFC Heavyweight Champion, and is a UFC Hall of Fame member.

In 2015, Ohio State won its first national championship, after coming close in 2008 and 2009. It broke Penn State's streak of four consecutive team titles, but extended the Big Ten's national championship run to nine with the help of 4-time NCAA champion Logan Stieber.

2015 Ohio State wrestler Kyle Snyder becomes youngest World Champion in United States Wrestling History. On Friday September 11 Kyle won five matches including a dramatic ending in the gold medal round at 97 kg/213 lbs. Trailing 4–3 with less than a minute remaining, Snyder got a takedown against returning World champion Abdusalam Gadisov of Russia and ultimately prevailed by criteria with the score tied at 5–5. "It is amazing hearing the USA chants, especially on a day like today – September 11," said Snyder. "It's important to come out here and represent your country to the best of your ability."

Ohio State University Buckeye Wrestling Team Accomplishments include:

- Most Wins – 20 (1990, 1992, and 2002)
- 1st-place finishes in the Big Ten Conference 1923, 1951, 2015 (shared with Iowa), 2017, 2018

NCAA Championships: 2015

- Consecutive Wins – 15 (2001 and 2002)
- Most Big Ten Wins – 7 (7–1 in 2009–10 and 2008–09); (7–0 in 1991–92) and (7–2 in 1980–81)
- Most All-Americans in a Season – 8 (2018) Nathan Tomasello, Luke Pletcher, Joey Mckenna, Micah Jordan, Bo Jordan, Myles Martin, Kollin Moore, Kyle Snyder
- Most Freshman All-Americans in a Season – 3 (2012) Hunter Stieber, Logan Stieber and Cam Tessari

== Track and Field ==
The Buckeyes' track team is also famous for being the first Buckeye team in any sport to win a national title, at the 1929 NCAA Division I Outdoor Track and Field Championships.

Mal Whitfield was the 1948 and 1952 Olympic Gold Medalist in the 800 Meters.

== Olympians ==
Ohio State has produced over two hundred Olympic athletes, most notably Jesse Owens who won four Olympic gold medals at the 1936 Berlin Olympics and is one of the greatest Olympians in history. In all, 48 Ohio State athletes have combined for a total of 77 Olympic medals which includes 33 gold, 28 silver and 16 bronze medals.

In the most recent 2026 Winter Olympic Games five current and seven former Ohio State women's hockey players participated on five of the 10 women's ice hockey teams at the Olympics.

== Club sports ==
College club sports in the United States are any sports offered at a university or college in the United States that compete competitively with other universities, or colleges, but are not regulated by the National Collegiate Athletic Association (NCAA) or National Association of Intercollegiate Athletics (NAIA), and do not have varsity status. In some cases, club sports have junior varsity status. Oftentimes, students who play club sports later move on to play the same sport at the varsity level, or vice versa. Collegiate club sports can exist at schools that do have teams that are part of the NCAA or NAIA. Many times, club sports are student-run and receive little financial aid from the school. An estimated 2 million student-athletes compete in club sports.

Typically, most sports offered at universities and offered in youth leagues are also available as a collegiate club sport. However, the variety of sports offered is often related to the size of the school. Collegiate club sports offer college athletes the ability to play at a competitive level, but without the time commitment generally required for a sport governed by the NCAA. The tryout procedure for club sports varies from school to school and from sport to sport.

=== Basketball ===
Collegiate Club Basketball is associated with the National Intramural and Recreational Sports Association, with regional qualifying and a national tournament every year. The head coach of the Ohio State Men's Club Basketball team is Eddie Days, who played for Ohio State Buckeyes men's basketball from 2009 to 2011. Ohio State Men's Club Basketball has won three national championships (2016, 2018, 2019).

In 2016, Ohio State defeated James Madison University in the national championship to win their first title. The Most Valuable Player of the tournament was Ohio State's Ryan Murray, who played college basketball at Centre College before transferring to Ohio State. In 2018, Ohio State defeated Harvard University in the national championship and the Most Valuable Player was Ohio State's Nick Moschetti, who played college basketball at Purdue University Fort Wayne before transferring to Ohio State. In 2019, Ohio State defeated The University of Houston in the national championship to win back-to-back titles, and their third national championship in four years. The Most Valuable Player of the 2019 Tournament was Ohio State's Evan Grootenhuis.

The 2020 Club Basketball season was cut short due to the COVID-19 pandemic. Ohio State was named league champion for the season, despite a majority of games not being played. No national champion was crowned.

=== Football ===
The Ohio State Club Football team, founded in 2009, gives Ohio State students without athletic scholarships the opportunity to play full-contact, 11-on-11 football with largely NCAA rules. Although not affiliated with the NCAA program, multiple former players such as Chris Booker, De'Shawn White, Eli Goins and others have gone on to walk-on to the NCAA team. The Ohio State Club Football program joined the National Club Football Association in 2012 and has won three NCFA national championships, going back-to-back in 2019 and 2021 (no games played in 2020 due to the COVID-19 pandemic) and winning again in 2024. The Buckeyes are one of just two programs to repeat as national champions (Coppin State 2012-2013) and the only program to boast three national championships.

In addition to their three national titles, the Buckeyes have won five conference titles (2019, 2021–2024) and two division titles (2018, 2019) all under current Head Coach, James Grega Jr. Ohio State has also had 109 players named to NCFA All-American teams since its inception, including quarterback Kellyn Gerenstein, who won the league's Offensive MVP award in 2019 and 2022 and the NCFA national championship game MVP Award in 2021. Gerenstein is the only player in NCFA history to win national league MVP honors twice.

=== Rugby ===
Founded in 1966, Ohio State's Rugby Football Club plays college rugby in Division 1-A in the Big Ten Universities conference against traditional Big 10 rivals such as Michigan. The Buckeyes are led by head coach Ron Bowers, who played rugby as a Buckeye, earning All-American honors in 1991. The Buckeyes best performances were in the 1990 and 1991 seasons, when they finished third in the nation in both seasons.

More recently, Ohio State has appeared in the Collegiate Rugby Championship, a tournament broadcast live on NBC, finishing 7th in 2010 and 14th in 2011. The Buckeyes were led in those two tournaments by Nate Ebner, who was named to the competition's All Tournament Team in 2010 and 2011, before entering the 2012 NFL draft and signing with the New England Patriots. The Buckeyes finished the 2010–11 season ranked 23rd in the country. Ohio State finished third at the 2012 Big Ten 7s, missing out on qualification to the 2012 USA Rugby Sevens Collegiate National Championships.

=== Tennis ===
The Ohio State club tennis team competes in the national USTA Tennis on Campus league and won the national championship in 2018, defeating the University of North Carolina.

=== Water Polo ===
Collegiate club water polo operates under the Collegiate Water Polo Association, with the United States split into 18 divisions based partly on geography and partly on conventional conferences across other collegiate sports. The Ohio State's Men's Water Polo club competes in the Big Ten division with other Big Ten teams such as Michigan St and Michigan. The Buckeyes competed in the CWPA National Collegiate Club Championship in 2013 (6th), 2014(5th), 2017(6th) and 2018(7th). The current head coaches of the men's team are Larry and AP.

== Championships ==
=== NCAA team championships ===
Ohio State has won 32 NCAA team national chamionships.

- Men's (24)
  - Baseball (1): 1966
  - Basketball (1): 1960
  - Fencing (1): 1942
  - Golf (2): 1945, 1979
  - Gymnastics (3): 1985, 1996, 2001
  - Outdoor Track & Field (1): 1929
  - Swimming (11): 1943, 1945, 1946, 1947, 1949, 1950, 1952, 1954, 1955, 1956, 1962
  - Volleyball (3): 2011, 2016, 2017
  - Wrestling (1): 2015
- Women's (5)
  - Rowing (3): 2013, 2014, 2015
  - Ice Hockey (2): 2022, 2024
- Co-ed (3)
  - Fencing (3): 2004, 2008, 2012
- See also:
  - List of NCAA schools with the most NCAA Division I championships
  - Big Ten Conference NCAA national team championships

=== Other national team championships ===
Below are 62 national team titles that were not bestowed by the NCAA (including sports it has never sponsored):

- Men's:
  - Football (9): 1942, 1954, 1957, 1961, 1968, 1970, 2002, 2014, 2024
- Women's:
  - Synchronized swimming (34): 1977, 1978, 1979, 1980, 1982, 1983, 1985, 1986, 1987, 1988, 1989, 1990, 1991, 1992, 1993, 1994, 1995, 1996, 1997, 2000, 2001, 2002, 2003, 2004, 2009, 2010, 2011, 2012, 2015, 2017, 2018, 2019, 2022, 2023
  - Pistol (8): 2000, 2003, 2004, 2009, 2017, 2021, 2022, 2023
- Co-ed:
  - Pistol (11): 2000, 2014, 2015, 2016, 2018, 2021, 2022, 2023, 2024, 2025, 2026
- See also:
  - List of Big Ten Conference national championships
  - List of NCAA schools with the most Division I national championships
  - List of NCAA schools with the most AIAW Division I national championships

== Big Ten regular-season championships ==
=== Men's ===
- Football: 1916, 1917, 1920, 1935, 1939, 1942, 1944, 1949, 1954, 1955, 1957, 1961, 1968, 1969, 1970, 1972, 1973, 1974, 1975, 1976, 1977, 1979, 1981, 1984, 1986, 1993, 1996, 1998, 2002, 2005, 2006, 2007, 2008, 2009, 2010 (vacated), 2014, 2017, 2018, 2019, 2020
- Basketball: 1925, 1933, 1939, 1944, 1946, 1950, 1960, 1961, 1962, 1963, 1964, 1968, 1971, 1991, 1992, 2000 (vacated), 2002 (vacated), 2006, 2007, 2010, 2011, 2012
- Baseball: 1917, 1924, 1943, 1951, 1955, 1965, 1966, 1967, 1991, 1993, 1994, 1995, 1999, 2001, 2009, 2016
- Golf: 1928, 1945, 1951, 1954, 1961, 1966, 1976, 1977, 1978, 1979, 1980, 1982, 1983, 1984, 1985, 1986, 1987, 1989, 1990, 1995, 1996, 1997, 2004
- Hockey: (CCHA): 1972, 2004 (Big Ten): 2019
- Gymnastics: 1983, 1985, 1987, 1993, 1994, 1996, 1997, 2001, 2002, 2005, 2006, 2007, 2016, 2017
- Indoor Track: 1942, 1948, 1949, 1950, 1993, 2018
- Outdoor Track: 1942, 1948, 1992, 1993, 2018, 2022
- Soccer: 2000, 2007, 2009, 2015, 2024
- Swimming: 1938, 1943, 1946, 1947, 1949, 1950, 1951, 1952, 1953, 1954, 1955, 1956, 2010
- Tennis: 1915, 1943, 1991, 2001, 2006, 2007, 2008, 2009, 2010, 2011, 2012, 2013, 2014, 2015, 2016, 2017, 2018, 2019, 2021, 2022, 2023, 2024, 2025, 2026
- Volleyball (MIVA): 1969, 1972, 1975, 1976, 1977, 1978, 1981, 1982, 1983, 1986, 1987, 1993, 1995, 1996, 1997, 1998, 1999, 2000, 2004, 2007, 2008, 2009, 2010, 2011, 2012, 2016, 2017, 2018, 2023
- Fencing: 1926, 1927, 1949, 1969, 1970, 1977, (MFC): 2003, 2004, 2005, 2006, 2007, 2008, 2009, 2014, 2015, 2016, 2017, 2018, 2019, 2020, (CCFC): 2021, 2022, 2023, 2024, 2025, 2026
- Wrestling: 1923, 1951, 2015, 2017, 2018
- Cross Country: 1923
- Lacrosse: (GWLL) 1986, 1988, 1999, 2003, 2004, 2008 (ECAC) 2014 (Big Ten) 2025, 2026
- Rifle: (WIRC) 1948, 1950, 1952, 1958, 1960, 1962, 1967, 1970, 1971, 1972, 1974, 1975, 1976, 1977, 1979, 1981, 1982, 1984, 1985, 1986, 1987, 1992, 1998, 1999, 2000, 2001, 2002, 2003, 2008, 2010, 2011, 2012, 2013

=== Women's ===
- Basketball: 1983, 1984, 1985, 1986, 1987, 1989, 1993, 2005, 2006, 2007, 2008, 2009, 2010, 2017 (vacated), 2018 (vacated), 2022, 2024
- Field Hockey: 2001, 2006, 2010
- Golf: 1983, 1984, 1985, 1988, 1993, 1997, 1999, 2002, 2003, 2004, 2005, 2014, 2015, 2016, 2019
- Gymnastics: 1983, 1984, 1985, 1986, 1987
- Rowing: 2002, 2006, 2011, 2013, 2014, 2015, 2016, 2017, 2018, 2022
- Soccer: 2010, 2017, 2026
- Softball: 1990, 2007
- Tennis: 2016, 2017, 2021, 2022, 2026
- Indoor Track: 2011, 2015, 2019, 2020
- Outdoor Track: 2011, 2012, 2019, 2021, 2022
- Swimming: 1982, 1983, 1984, 1985, 1986, 2020, 2021, 2022, 2023, 2025
- Volleyball: 1989, 1991, 1994
- Ice Hockey: (WCHA) 2023, 2024, 2026

== Media ==
On April 2, 2009, Ohio State signed a 10-year media-rights agreement with IMG College (now a part of Learfield IMG College) and RadiOhio (former owner of the school's radio network flagship WBNS/WBNS-FM in Columbus, and now a part of Tegna Inc.), worth nearly $128 million, the largest such agreement in college sports.

== The Ohio State University Marching Band ==
The Ohio State University Marching Band (nicknamed "The Best Damn Band In The Land") is currently under direction of Dr. Christopher Hoch. This all brass band has 228 members, and was first formed in 1878. The band has traditions including a field march that forms a "Script Ohio", during which, a senior sousaphone player gets to "dot the i" in the word Ohio.

== School colors ==
The Ohio State school colors of scarlet and gray were chosen by a committee of three students (Curtis C. Howard, Harwood R. Pool, and Alice Townshend) prior to the school's first graduation ceremony in 1878. The committee's original recommendation was to be orange and black. The committee soon discovered that Princeton already used the colors, however, and changed their recommendation. For this reason some references claim that Ohio State's original school colors were orange and black. This claim is not quite accurate, in that the committee never filed the original report with that recommendation.

== Pageantry ==
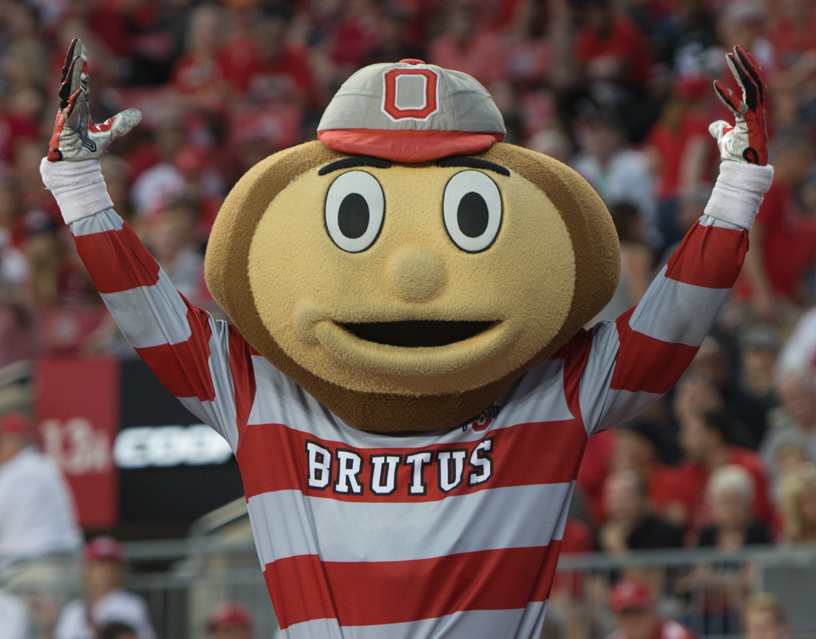
Brutus Buckeye, Ohio State's mascot

Team colors: Scarlet and Gray
Outfitter: Nike J. America
Fight songs: Across the Field, Buckeye Battle Cry
Often played songs: Hang on Sloopy, Le Regiment
Alma mater: Carmen Ohio
Nicknames: Buckeyes (officially adopted in 1950), The Bucks, The Silver Bullets
Mascot: Brutus Buckeye
Rivalries: Michigan Wolverines, Illinois Fighting Illini, Penn State Nittany Lions, Ohio Wesleyan Battling Bishops (former)
Marching band: The Ohio State University Marching Band, known as TBDBITL, or The Best Damn Band In The Land. Famous for "Script Ohio" and the "Ramp Entrance". The dotting of the "i" in "Script Ohio" by a sousaphone (tuba) player who high-kicks out and does a giant bow to the crowd was voted the #1 greatest sports tradition ever, in Athlon Sports, ESPN, and Sports Illustrated.
Radio network: Ohio State Sports Network – Flagships WBNS AM 1460 (ESPN Columbus) and WBNS FM (97.1 The Fan)
Announcers: Paul Keels (Play By Play); Jim Lachey (Color (football)), Ron Stokes (Color (basketball))
