= List of NCAA schools with the most NCAA Division I championships =

Listed below are the colleges or universities with the most National Collegiate Athletic Association (NCAA) Division I-sanctioned team championships, individual championships, and combined team and individual championships, as documented by information published on official NCAA websites. Excluded from this list are all national championships earned outside the scope of NCAA competition, including Division I FBS football titles, women's AIAW championships, men's rowing, equestrian titles, and retroactive Helms title nominations.

== NCAA Division I team championships ==
Totals for the 40 schools as of July 1, 2026, come from a summary of championships published by the NCAA and NCAA published gymnastics history, with subsequent results as of July 1, 2026, obtained via NCAA.org, which provides updates throughout the year. For details on championships, click on a school's nickname and then open up its championships section.

| Institution | Undergraduate enrollment | Total | Men's | Women's | Co-ed† | Nickname | Primary conference | Rank |
|---|---|---|---|---|---|---|---|---|
| Stanford University | 7,083 | 140 | 72 (Note: The NCAA started sponsoring the intercollegiate golf championship in 1939, but it retained the titles from the 41 championships previously conferred by the National Intercollegiate Golf Association in its records. Of these pre-NCAA titles, Yale, Princeton, Michigan and Stanford won 20, 11, 2 and 1, respectively.) | 68 | 0 | Cardinal | Atlantic Coast Conference | 1 |
| University of California, Los Angeles | 31,002 | 127 (Note: Arkansas' 2004 and 2005 men's outdoor track and field championships, LSU's 2012 women's outdoor track and field championship, and UCLA's 1995 softball championship were all vacated by the NCAA Committee on Infractions and are not included in the schools' totals.) | 80 | 47 | 0 | Bruins | Big Ten Conference | 2 |
| University of Southern California | 21,000 | 116 | 87 | 29 | 0 | Trojans | Big Ten Conference | 3 |
| University of Texas at Austin | 40,916 | 62 | 28 | 34 | 0 | Longhorns | Southeastern Conference | 4 |
| Pennsylvania State University | 48,535 | 57 | 32 | 12 | 13 | Nittany Lions | Big Ten Conference | 5 |
| Oklahoma State University | 20,024 | 55 | 55 | 0 | 0 | Cowboys | Big 12 Conference | 6 |
| University of Arkansas | 22,283 | 54 | 45 | 9 | 0 | Razorbacks | Southeastern Conference | 7 |
| University of North Carolina | 18,415 | 52 | 13 | 39 | 0 | Tar Heels | Atlantic Coast Conference | 8 |
| Louisiana State University | 26,159 | 48 | 21 | 27 | 0 | Tigers | Southeastern Conference | 9 |
| University of Florida | 34,881 | 44 | 24 | 20 | 0 | Gators | Southeastern Conference | 10 |
| University of California, Berkeley | 27,496 | 43 | 34 | 9 | 0 | Golden Bears | Atlantic Coast Conference | 11 |
| University of Michigan | 28,395 | 41 | 38 | 3 | 0 | Wolverines | Big Ten Conference | 12 |
| University of Oklahoma | 24,562 | 40 | 24 | 16 | 0 | Sooners | Southeastern Conference | 13 |
| University of Virginia | 15,669 | 37 | 24 | 13 | 0 | Cavaliers | Atlantic Coast Conference | 14 |
| University of Denver | 5,758 | 36 | 26 | 0 | 10 | Pioneers | Summit League (West Coast Conference in 2026) | 15 |
| University of Georgia | 26,882 | 35 | 10 | 25 | 0 | Bulldogs | Southeastern Conference | 16 |
| University of Oregon | 20,552 | 35 | 20 | 15 | 0 | Ducks | Big Ten Conference | 16 |
| University of Wisconsin | 29,302 | 34 | 22 | 12 | 0 | Badgers | Big Ten Conference | 18 |
| Ohio State University | 44,741 | 32 | 24 | 5 | 3 | Buckeyes | Big Ten Conference | 19 |
| University of Maryland | 27,443 | 32 | 9 | 23 | 0 | Terrapins | Big Ten Conference | 19 |
| Yale University | 5,453 | 29 | 27 | 2 | 0 | Bulldogs | Ivy League | 21 |
| University of Colorado | 26,426 | 28 | 16 | 3 | 9 | Buffaloes | Big 12 Conference | 22 |
| University of Notre Dame | 8,448 | 27 | 10 | 7 | 10 | Fighting Irish | Atlantic Coast Conference | 23 |
| University of Utah | 23,909 | 27 | 2 | 9 | 16 | Utes | Big 12 Conference | 23 |
| University of Iowa | 22,354 | 26 | 25 | 1 | 0 | Hawkeyes | Big Ten Conference | 25 |
| Arizona State University | 50,246 | 25 | 12 | 13 | 0 | Sun Devils | Big 12 Conference | 26 |
| University of Connecticut (UConn) | 18,395 | 25 | 8 | 17 | 0 | Huskies | Big East Conference | 26 |
| Indiana University | 32,752 | 24 | 24 | 0 | 0 | Hoosiers | Big Ten Conference | 28 |
| Princeton University | 5,391 | 24 | 19 | 4 | 1 | Tigers | Ivy League | 28 |
| West Virginia University | 22,563 | 22 | 1 | 0 | 21 | Mountaineers | Big 12 Conference | 30 |
| Villanova University | 6,394 | 21 | 12 | 9 | 0 | Wildcats | Big East Conference | 31 |
| University of Nebraska | 20,182 | 21 | 8 | 13 | 0 | Cornhuskers | Big Ten Conference | 31 |
| University of Texas at El Paso | 25,151 | 21 | 21 | 0 | 0 | Miners | Conference USA (Mountain West Conference in 2026) | 31 |
| Michigan State University | 39,143 | 20 | 19 | 1 | 0 | Spartans | Big Ten Conference | 34 |
| University of Arizona | 31,670 | 19 | 7 | 12 | 0 | Wildcats | Big 12 Conference | 35 |
| University of Minnesota | 30,511 | 19 | 13 | 6 | 0 | Golden Gophers | Big Ten Conference | 35 |
| University of Illinois | 32,878 | 18 | 18 | 0 | 0 | Fighting Illini | Big Ten Conference | 37 |
| University of Houston | 34,830 | 17 | 17 | 0 | 0 | Cougars | Big 12 Conference | 38 |
| Duke University | 6,485 | 17 | 9 | 8 | 0 | Blue Devils | Atlantic Coast Conference | 38 |
| University of Tennessee | 21,451 | 17 | 7 | 10 | 0 | Volunteers | Southeastern Conference | 38 |

† Co-ed sports include fencing (from 1990 to 2025), rifle, and skiing (since 1983). Fencing championships before 1990 and after 2025, as well as skiing championships before 1983, were awarded as men's or women's championships and are counted here as such.

== Combined NCAA Division I Team and Individual Championships ==
The following table lists the top twelve NCAA schools with the most combined NCAA Division I Team and Individual Championships.

| Institution | Location | Est. | Type | Undergraduate enrollment | Nickname | Total team titles | Total individual titles | Total combined titles | Primary conference |
|---|---|---|---|---|---|---|---|---|---|
| Stanford University | Stanford, CA | 1891 | Private | 7,083 | Cardinal | 140 (Note: See Note (a) in the table "NCAA Division I Team Championships", above.) | 565 | 704 | Atlantic Coast Conference |
| University of Southern California | Los Angeles, CA | 1880 | Private | 21,000 | Trojans | 116 | 422 | 537 | Big Ten Conference |
| University of Texas at Austin | Austin, TX | 1883 | Public | 49,696 | Longhorns | 60 | 403 | 461 | Southeastern Conference |
| University of California, Los Angeles | Los Angeles, CA | 1919 | Public | 31,002 | Bruins | 127 | 279 | 404 | Big Ten Conference |
| University of Florida | Gainesville, FL | 1853 | Public | 34,881 | Gators | 44 | 348 | 390 | Southeastern Conference |
| University of Michigan | Ann Arbor, MI | 1817 | Public | 26,083 | Wolverines | 41 | 326 | 365 | Big Ten Conference |
| University of California, Berkeley | Berkeley, CA | 1868 | Public | 33,078 | Golden Bears | 43 | 274 | 317 | Atlantic Coast Conference |
| Ohio State University | Columbus, OH | 1870 | Public | 44,201 | Buckeyes | 32 | 275 | 307 | Big Ten Conference |
| Louisiana State University | Baton Rouge, LA | 1860 | Public | 32,666 | Tigers | 48 | 234 | 281 | Southeastern Conference |
| University of Georgia | Athens, GA | 1785 | Public | 30,166 | Bulldogs | 34 | 229 | 260 | Southeastern Conference |
| Pennsylvania State University | University Park, PA | 1855 | Public | 73,250 | Nittany Lions | 57 | 186 | 242 | Big Ten Conference |
| Oklahoma State University | Stillwater, OK | 1890 | Public | 23,307 | Cowboys | 55 | 182 | 234 | Big 12 Conference |

== See also ==
- List of NCAA schools with the most Division I national championships
- List of NCAA schools with the most AIAW Division I national championships
- NACDA Directors' Cup
