= List of NCAA schools with the most Division I national championships =

This is a list of U.S. universities and colleges that have won the most team sport national championships (more than 15) that have been bestowed for the highest level of collegiate athletic competition, be that at either the varsity or club level, as determined by the governing organization of each sport.

== Scope of the list ==
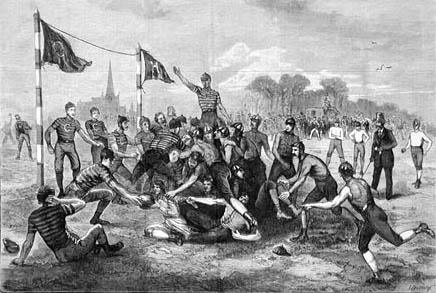
Intercollegiate competition predates NCAA regulation, beginning in 1852 when crews from Harvard and Yale raced each other at a rowing meet. This 19th-century print depicts a football game between Columbia and Harvard.

While many collegiate sports championships in the United States are now sponsored by the NCAA, historically this was not the case, and many championships were organized for decades without NCAA sponsorship. This list includes both (i) NCAA championships and (ii) titles won in competitions organized by bodies other than the NCAA.

The column in the list below that sets forth NCAA championships includes (but is not limited to) all non-football titles won at the highest level organized by the NCAA (Division I/Collegiate), as of July 1, 2025, for sports years through that date and with updated results for subsequent sports year(s). (In accordance with the NCAA's own records, this column includes certain "unofficial" NCAA championships won during years the NCAA did not calculate winning team scores – boxing from 1932 through 1947, track and field from 1925 to 1927, and wrestling in 1928 and 1931–1933.) It also includes the short-lived trampoline titles in 1969–1970. Other championships are set forth in other columns. For example, women's sports were solely organized by the AIAW rather than the NCAA prior to the 1981–1982 year of dual championships, and these titles are included in their own separate column. Notably, the championship in the highest level of NCAA football (FBS) to date is still not sponsored by the NCAA, nor has the oldest organized intercollegiate competition, men's rowing, ever been subject to NCAA control (included in the "Other Team Titles" column).

=== "Other team titles" column ===
The "Other team titles" column includes championships won by schools in one of the 27 sports that are (or were) sponsored by the NCAA or AIAW, during years competitive championships were organized by other bodies. These 27 sports are: women's badminton; baseball; basketball; women's bowling; boxing; cross country; fencing; field hockey; golf; gymnastics; ice hockey; lacrosse; indoor rifle; outdoor rifle; women's rowing; skiing; soccer; softball; swimming; women's synchronized swimming; tennis; indoor track; outdoor track; men's trampoline; volleyball; women's beach volleyball, water polo; and wrestling. Finally, the "Other team titles" column also includes championships won in three other sports: men's rowing (1871–present), which has voluntarily remained outside NCAA sponsorship, and two NCAA "emerging sports" that organize championships, women's equestrian (2002–present) and women's rugby (1991–present).

As more specifically detailed on the table of sports, below, the "Other team titles" column includes: (i) historic non-NCAA tournament titles compiled here, (ii) non-AIAW women's championships listed here, (iii) overall ("dual discipline") women's equestrian championships, (iv) gold medal lacrosse teams listed here and Wingate lacrosse championships, (v) pre-NCAA golf championships (NCAA started sponsoring the golf championship in 1939; the previous 41 championships conferred by the National Intercollegiate Golf Association are in the "Other" column); (vi) pre-NCAA swimming championships; (vii) ISFA soccer championships; and (viii) USA Rugby Women’s Division 1A championships.

It does not include Helms Athletic Foundation or Premo-Porretta Power Poll selections for men's basketball, which were awarded retroactively.

== Most collegiate team national championships ==
Institution	Location	Founded	Type	Nickname	NCAA team titles	Claimed football titles	AIAW team titles	Other team titles (Note: As detailed on the table of sports, below, the "Other team titles" column includes all 27 sports that are or were at one time sponsored by the NCAA or AIAW, plus men's rowing championships (RAAC and IRA), overall women's equestrian championships, and women’s rugby championships.)	Total team titles	Primary conference
Stanford University	Stanford, California	1891	Private	Cardinal	139 (Note: The NCAA started sponsoring the intercollegiate golf championship in 1939, but it retained the titles from the 41 championships previously conferred by the National Intercollegiate Golf Association in its records. Of these pre-NCAA titles, Yale, Princeton, Harvard, Michigan, Dartmouth and Stanford won 20, 11, 6, 2, 1 and 1, respectively. These titles are counted in the "Other team titles" column.)	2	2	17	160	Atlantic Coast Conference
UCLA	Los Angeles, California	1919	Public	Bruins	127 (Note: The NCAA Committee on Infractions has vacated the following championships, which are not included in the schools' totals: Arkansas' 2004 and 2005 men's outdoor track and field championships, LSU's 2012 women's outdoor track and field championship, UCLA's 1995 softball championship, Syracuse's 1990 men's lacrosse championship, and Florida State's 2007 men's outdoor track and field championship.)	1	8	11	147	Big Ten Conference
USC	Los Angeles, California	1880	Private	Trojans	116	11	6	5	138	Big Ten Conference
Pennsylvania State University	University Park, Pennsylvania	1855	Public	Nittany Lions	57	2	6	36	101	Big Ten Conference
Yale University	New Haven, Connecticut	1701	Private	Bulldogs	9	27	1	51	88	Ivy League
Cornell University	Ithaca, New York	1865	Private	Big Red	6	5	0	70	81	Ivy League
Ohio State University	Columbus, Ohio	1870	Public	Buckeyes	32	9	5	29	75	Big Ten Conference
Navy	Annapolis, Maryland	1845	Public	Midshipmen	5	1	0	68 (Note: Navy's 68 other titles are: 4x boxing (1925, 26, 28, 31); 14x men's fencing (foils: 1901, 05, 07, 10, 15–17, 20–22; 3-weapon: 1924, 25, 39, 43); men's gymnastics (1925); 12x men's rifle (1924–26, 30, 31, 34, 35, 37, 39, 48, 67, 69); men's outdoor rifle (1921); 17x men's lacrosse (1928, 29, 38, 43, 45, 46, 49, 54, 60–67, 70); 2x men's swimming, unofficial NCAA (1925, 26); men's soccer (1932); 16x men's rowing (1921, 22, 25, 31, 38, 47, 52, 60, 63, 65, 82–84, 90, 93, 95).)	74	Patriot League
Princeton University	Princeton, New Jersey	1746	Private	Tigers	14	28	0	31	73	Ivy League
University of Texas	Austin, Texas	1883	Public	Longhorns	63	4	4	1	72	Southeastern Conference
University of California, Berkeley	Berkeley, California	1868	Public	Golden Bears	43	5	0	15	63	Atlantic Coast Conference
University of Michigan	Ann Arbor, Michigan	1817	Public	Wolverines	39	12	0	9	60	Big Ten Conference
University of Washington	Seattle, Washington	1861	Public	Huskies	9	2	1	46 (Note: Washington's 46 other titles are: 30x men's rowing (1923, 24, 26, 33, 36, 37, 40, 41, 48, 50, 53, 59, 64, 70, 2007–15, 17-19, 21, 24–26); 6x women's rowing (1981, 83–85, 87, 88); 2x men's rifle (telegraphic: 1925, 32); 5x women's rifle (1923-25, 33, 34); 3x men's skiing (1940-42).)	58	Big Ten Conference
Arizona State University	Phoenix metropolitan area	1885	Public	Sun Devils	25	0	12	20	57	Big 12 Conference
Oklahoma State University	Stillwater, Oklahoma	1890	Public	Cowboys	55	1	0	1	57	Big 12 Conference
University of Wisconsin	Madison, Wisconsin	1848	Public	Badgers	34	0	1	22	57	Big Ten Conference
Penn	Philadelphia	1740	Private	Quakers	4	7	0	43	54	Ivy League
University of Arkansas	Fayetteville, Arkansas	1871	Public	Razorbacks	54	1	0	0	55	Southeastern Conference
University of North Carolina	Chapel Hill, North Carolina	1789	Public	Tar Heels	52	0	1	0	53	Atlantic Coast Conference
LSU	Baton Rouge, Louisiana	1860	Public	Tigers	48	4	0	1	53	Southeastern Conference
Harvard University	Cambridge, Massachusetts	1636	Private	Crimson	5	7	0	39	51	Ivy League
University of Florida	Gainesville, Florida	1853	Public	Gators	44	3	2	0	49	Southeastern Conference
University of Maryland	College Park, Maryland	1856	Public	Terrapins	32	1	1	14	48	Big Ten Conference
University of Georgia	Athens, Georgia	1785	Public	Bulldogs	35	4	0	8	47	Southeastern Conference
University of Oklahoma	Norman, Oklahoma	1890	Public	Sooners	40	7	0	0	47	Southeastern Conference
Columbia University	New York City	1754	Private	Lions	16	2	0	22	40	Ivy League
University of Virginia	Charlottesville, Virginia	1819	Public	Cavaliers	37	0	1	2	40	Atlantic Coast Conference
University of Denver	Denver, Colorado	1864	Private	Pioneers	36	0	0 (Note: Denver's 1982 gymnastics championship at the AIAW Division II level is not included in its Total column because it was not won at the highest level of competition (Division I).)	3	39	Summit League (West Coast Conference in 2026)
University of Iowa	Iowa City, Iowa	1847	Public	Hawkeyes	26	5	0	8	39	Big Ten Conference
University of Notre Dame	South Bend, Indiana	1842	Private	Fighting Irish	27	11	0	0	38	Atlantic Coast Conference
Michigan State University	East Lansing, Michigan	1855	Public	Spartans	20	6	1	10	37	Big Ten Conference
NYU	New York City	1831	Private	Violets	12	0	0	25	37	University Athletic Association
University of Oregon	Eugene, Oregon	1876	Public	Ducks	35	0	0	0	35	Big Ten Conference
University of Nebraska–Lincoln	Lincoln, Nebraska	1869	Public	Cornhuskers	21	5	1	6	33	Big Ten Conference
University of Utah	Salt Lake City, Utah	1850	Public	Utes	27	0	3 (Note: Utah's 1981 cross-country championship at the AIAW Division II level is not included in its Total column because it was not won at the highest level of competition (Division I).)	3	33	Big 12 Conference
University of Colorado	Boulder, Colorado	1876	Public	Buffaloes	28	1	1	1	31	Big 12 Conference
Army	West Point, New York	1802	Public	Black Knights	2	3	0	25	30	Patriot League
University of Minnesota	Minneapolis and Saint Paul, Minnesota	1851	Public	Golden Gophers	19	7	0	4	30	Big Ten Conference
University of Alabama	Tuscaloosa, Alabama	1831	Public	Crimson Tide	10	18	0	0	28	Southeastern Conference
University of Connecticut	Storrs, Connecticut	1881	Public	Huskies	25	0	0	2	27	Big East Conference
Villanova University	Villanova, Pennsylvania	1842	Private	Wildcats	21	0	0	6	27	Big East Conference
West Virginia University	Morgantown, West Virginia	1867	Public	Mountaineers	22	0	0	5	27	Big 12 Conference
Syracuse University	Syracuse, New York	1870	Private	Orange	16	1	0	9	26	Atlantic Coast Conference
Indiana University	Bloomington, Indiana	1820	Public	Hoosiers	24	1	1	0	26	Big Ten Conference
Tennessee State University	Nashville, Tennessee	1912	Public	Lady Tigers	0	0	0	24	24	Ohio Valley Conference
University of Illinois	Champaign, Illinois	1867	Public	Fighting Illini	18	5	0	1	24	Big Ten Conference
University of Tennessee	Knoxville, Tennessee	1794	Public	Volunteers	17	6	1	0	24	Southeastern Conference
Texas A&M University	College Station, Texas	1876	Public	Aggies	17	3	1	3	24	Southeastern Conference
Johns Hopkins University	Baltimore, Maryland	1876	Private	Blue Jays	9	0	0	14	23	Big Ten Conference, lacrosse only
Auburn University	Auburn, Alabama	1856	Public	Tigers	16	9	0	6	31	Southeastern Conference
University of Arizona	Tucson, Arizona	1885	Public	Wildcats	19	0	2	1	22	Big 12 Conference
University of Texas at El Paso	El Paso, Texas	1914	Public	Miners	21	0	0	0	21	Conference USA (Mountain West Conference in 2026)
Florida State University	Tallahassee, Florida	1851	Public	Seminoles	12	3	3	3	21	Atlantic Coast Conference
Dartmouth College	Hanover, New Hampshire	1769	Private	Big Green	3	1	1	14	19	Ivy League
Iowa State University	Ames, Iowa	1858	Public	Cyclones	13	0	6	0	19	Big 12 Conference
Tuskegee University (Note: Although not currently an NCAA Division I school, Tuskegee University won all 18 of its national championships at the highest level of competition in the United States, prior to establishment of collegiate divisions.)	Tuskegee, Alabama	1881	Private	Tigerettes	0	0	0	18	18	Southern Intercollegiate Athletic Conference
University of Houston	Houston, Texas	1927	Public	Cougars	17	0	0	0	17	Big 12 Conference
Duke University	Durham, North Carolina	1838	Private	Blue Devils	17	0	0	0	17	Atlantic Coast Conference
San José State University	San Jose California	1857	Public	Spartans	10	0	0	7	17	Mountain West Conference
Northwestern University	Evanston, Illinois	1851	Private	Wildcats	14	0	0	4	18	Big Ten Conference
University of Miami	Coral Gables, Florida	1925	Private	Hurricanes	5	5	5	1	16	Atlantic Coast Conference

== Table of sports ==
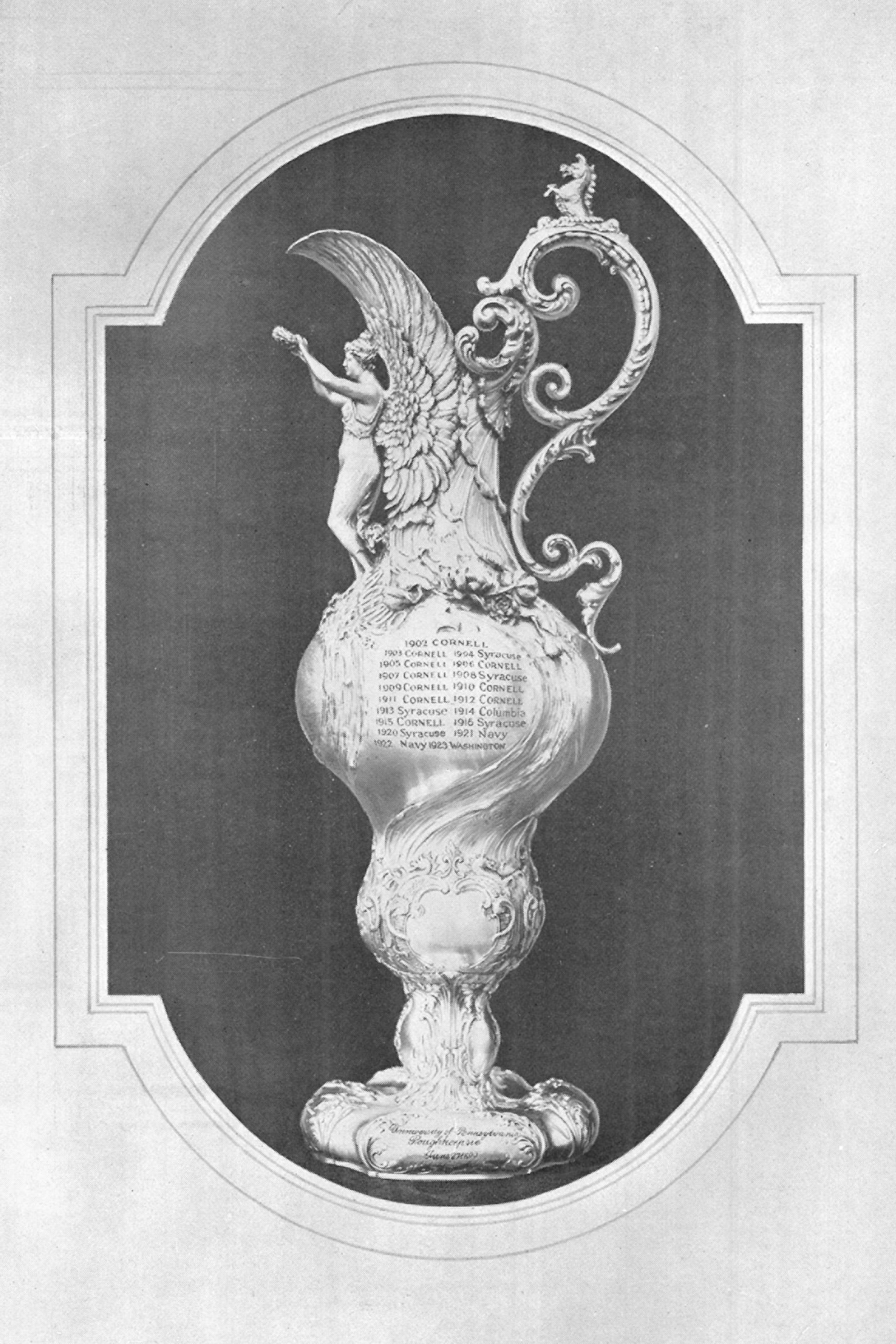
Varsity Challenge Cup, men's varsity heavyweight eight championship trophy of the Intercollegiate Rowing Association.

Sport	Current NCAA DI championship sport	Years sponsored by NCAA	Years sponsored by AIAW	Titles included in "Other" column
Badminton (W)	✗	—	1973–82	1970–72, 1983–93
Baseball	✓	1947–present	—	1893
Basketball (M)	✓	1939–present	—	1904–38 (various tourney winners); 1939–50 NIT champs
Basketball (W)	✓	1982–present	1972–82	1969–71
Bowling (W)	✓	2004–present	—	1975–2003
Boxing	✗	1932–1960 (Note: The first year of NCAA sponsorship of the boxing championship was 1932. Before 1948, NCAA team boxing championships were unofficial because team points were not officially awarded.)	—	1924–31
Cross country (M)	✓	1938–present	—	1899–1937
Cross country (W)	✓	1982–present	1975–81	—
Equestrian (W)	✗	—	—	2002–present
Fencing (M)	✓ (Note: A single coed team fencing championship was contested from 1990 to 2025.)	1941–42, 1947–present	—	1894–1943
Fencing (W)	✓	1982–present	1980–82	1929–79
Field hockey	✓	1981–present	1975–81	—
Football, FBS	✗	—	—	N/A: football has its own separate column
Golf (M)	✓	1939–present	—	1897–1938
Golf (W)	✓	1982–present	1972–82	1970–71
Gymnastics (M)	✓	1938–present	—	1900–02, 1917, 1925, 1944 (AAU)
Gymnastics (W)	✓	1982–present	1973–82	1969–72
Ice hockey (M)	✓	1948–present	—	1940, 1942 (AAU)
Ice hockey (W)	✓	2001–present	—	1998–2000
Lacrosse (M)	✓	1971–present	—	1881, 1912, 1921, 1926–31, 1936–70
Lacrosse (W)	✓	1982–present	1981–82	1978–80
Rifle (co-ed)	✓	1980–present	—	1905–79
Rowing (M)	✗	—	—	1871–present (overall points since 1952)
Rowing (W)	✓	1997–present	1982	1973, 1975, 1980–81, 1983–96
Rugby (W)	✗	—	—	1991–present
Skiing (M)	✓ co-ed since 1983	1954–present	—	1921–53 (various)
Skiing (W)	✓ co-ed since 1983	1983–present	1977–82	—
Soccer (M)	✓	1959–present	—	1908–35, 1946–48, 1952–58 (ISFA champs); 1949–51 Soccer Bowl champs
Soccer (W)	✓	1982–present	1981	1980
Softball	✓	1982–present	1973–82 (also slowpitch 1981–82)	1969–72
Swimming (M)	✓	1924–present (Note: The first year of NCAA sponsorship of the swimming championship was 1924. Before 1937, NCAA team swimming championships were unofficial because team points were not officially awarded.)	—	—
Swimming (W)	✓	1982–present	1973–82	1968–72
Synchronized swimming (W)	✗	—	1977–82	1983–present
Tennis (M)	✓	1946–present	—	1929–31 indoor
Tennis (W)	✓	1982–present	1977–82	1968–76
Track, indoor (M)	✓	1965–present	—	1918, 1923–64
Track, indoor (W)	✓	1983–present	1978–82	1941–79 (AAU)
Track, outdoor (M)	✓	1921–present	—	1876–1920
Track, outdoor (W)	✓	1982–present	1972–82	1923–26, 1937–67 (AAU), 1969–71 (DGWS)
Trampoline (M)	✗	1969–70	—	—
Volleyball (M)	✓	1970–present	—	1949–1969
Volleyball (W)	✓	1981–present	1972–81	1969–71
Volleyball, beach (W)	✓	2016–present	—	2007–10, 2012–15
Water polo (M)	✓	1969–present	—	1913, 1968
Water polo (W)	✓	2001–present	—	1984–2000
Wrestling (M)	✓	1928–present	—	1921
Wrestling (W)	✓	2026–present		2020–2025

== See also ==
- List of NCAA schools with the most NCAA Division I championships
- List of NCAA schools with the most AIAW Division I national championships
- List of college athletics championship game outcomes
- Mythical national championship
- Helms Athletic Foundation
