= List of NCAA schools with the most AIAW Division I national championships =

Listed below are the colleges and universities with the most AIAW top-level sanctioned team championships. Before the NCAA began sponsoring women's collegiate sports, the AIAW operated as a national organizing body, conducted tournaments, and awarded national championships for women's sports from 1972 to 1982. Its predecessor within the same overall organization was the Division for Girls' and Women's Sports (DGWS), which sponsored competition and conducted team championships in eight sports from the 1967–68 year through the winter of the 1971–72 year, at which time the AIAW came into being. The table below includes AIAW and DGWS championships won both before and after the existence of divisions. Results are included for the Large College Division, which was later renamed Division I.

== AIAW Division I team championships ==
The schools on this list currently compete in NCAA Division I except where noted.

Institution	Location	Founded	Type	Nickname	Total AIAW DI^{†} titles
Arizona State University	Phoenix metropolitan area	1885	Public	Sun Devils	18
University of California, Los Angeles	Los Angeles, California	1919	Public	Bruins	10
West Chester University*	West Chester, Pennsylvania	1871	Public	Golden Rams	6
University of Miami	Coral Gables, Florida	1925	Public	Hurricanes	6
University of Southern California	Los Angeles, California	1880	Private	Trojans	6
Pennsylvania State University	University Park, Pennsylvania	1855	Public	Nittany Lions	6
Iowa State University	Ames, Iowa	1858	Public	Cyclones	5
Ohio State University	Columbus, Ohio	1870	Public	Buckeyes	5 ^{§}
Long Beach State University	Long Beach, California	1949	Public	49ers	5
Texas Woman's University*	Denton, Texas	1901	Public	Pioneers	4
University of Texas	Austin, Texas	1883	Public	Longhorns	4
Delta State University*	Cleveland, Mississippi	1924	Public	Lady Statesmen	3
Florida State University	Tallahassee, Florida	1851	Public	Seminoles	3
Immaculata University^{‡}	Malvern, Pennsylvania	1920	Private	Mighty Macs	3
California State University, Northridge	Northridge, Los Angeles, California	1958	Public	Matadors	3
Springfield College^{‡}	Springfield, Massachusetts	1885	Private	Pride	3
Southern Illinois University	Carbondale, Illinois	1869	Public	Salukis	3
Utah State University	Logan, Utah	1888	Public	Aggies	3

13 schools with two titles each: Arizona ^{§}, Cal State Fullerton, Clarion State, Florida, Middlebury, North Carolina State, Old Dominion, Pasadena City College, Prairie View A&M, Stanford, Sul Ross State, Tulsa, Utah.
30 schools with one title each: Cal State Hayward, Colorado, Dartmouth, Furman, Hawaii, Illinois, Indiana, Louisiana Tech, Maryland, Massachusetts, Michigan State, Mississippi State College for Women, Nebraska, North Carolina, North Carolina Greensboro, Northern Illinois, Northern Iowa, Omaha, Rollins, Rutgers, Southern Methodist, Southwest Missouri State, Temple, Tennessee, Texas A&M, Texas El Paso, Vermont, Virginia, Washington, Yale.
^{†} No divisions (most sports) in 1967–1979 (includes DGWS). Large College Division (5 sports only) in 1974 (varies)–1979. Division I in 1979–1982
* Now competes in NCAA Division II.
^{‡} Now competes in NCAA Division III.
^{§} Includes a tie for the 1980 synchronized swimming title.
Note: John F. Kennedy College won the first three softball national championships in 1969–71. The school closed in 1975.

== Sports with AIAW/DGWS team championships by year ==
Year	Badminton	Basketball	Cross country	Fencing	Field hockey	Golf	Gymnastics	Lacrosse	Rowing	Skiing	Soccer	Softball	Slow-pitch softball	Swimming & diving	Synchronized swimming	Tennis	Track & field (indoor)	Track & field (outdoor)	Volleyball	Total
1967–68	✗	✗	✗	✗	✗	✗	✗	✗	✗	✗	✗	✗	✗	✓	✗	✗	✗	✗	✗	1
1968–69	✗	✓	✗	✗	✗	✗	✓	✗	✗	✗	✗	✓	✗	✓	✗	✗	✗	✓	✗	5
1969–70	✓	✓	✗	✗	✗	✓	✓	✗	✗	✗	✗	✓	✗	✓	✗	✗	✗	✓	✓	8
1970–71	✓	✓	✗	✗	✗	✓	✓	✗	✗	✗	✗	✓	✗	✓	✗	✗	✗	✓	✓	8
1971–72	✓	✓	✗	✗	✗	✓	✓	✗	✗	✗	✗	✓	✗	✓	✗	✗	✗	✓	✓	8
1972–73	✓	✓	✗	✗	✗	✓	✓	✗	✗	✗	✗	✓	✗	✓	✗	✗	✗	✓	✓	8
1973–74	✓	✓	✗	✗	✗	✓	✓	✗	✗	✗	✗	✓	✗	✓	✗	✗	✗	✓	✓	8
1974–75	✓	✓	✗	✗	✗	✓	✓	✗	✗	✗	✗	✓	✗	✓	✗	✗	✗	✓	✓	8
1975–76	✓	✓	✓	✗	✓	✓	✓	✗	✗	✗	✗	✓	✗	✓	✗	✗	✗	✓	✓	10
1976–77	✓	✓	✓	✗	✓	✓	✓	✗	✗	✓	✗	✓	✗	✓	✓	✓	✗	✓	✓	13
1977–78	✓	✓	✓	✗	✓	✓	✓	✗	✗	✓	✗	✓	✗	✓	✓	✓	✗	✓	✓	13
1978–79	✓	✓	✓	✗	✓	✓	✓	✗	✗	✓	✗	✓	✗	✓	✓	✓	✗	✓	✓	13
1979–80	✓	✓	✓	✓	✓	✓	✓	✗	✗	✓	✗	✓	✗	✓	✓	✓	✓	✓	✓	15
1980–81	✓	✓	✓	✓	✓	✓	✓	✓	✗	✓	✗	✓	✓	✓	✓	✓	✓	✓	✓	17
1981–82	✓	✓	✓	✓	✓	✓	✓	✓	✓	✓	✓	✓	✓	✓	✓	✓	✓	✓	✓	19
Totals	13	14	7	3	7	13	14	2	1	6	1	14	2	15	6	6	3	14	13	154

== See also ==
- List of NCAA schools with the most Division I national championships
- List of NCAA schools with the most NCAA Division I championships
