= United States Football League on the radio =

== Local coverage ==
=== 1983 ===
Team	Play-by-play	Analyst(s)	Flagship station
Arizona	Ray Scott	John Moynihan	KOY-AM
Birmingham	Jim Fyffe	Herb Winches and Dick James	WAPI
Boston	Gil Santos	Gino Cappelletti	WBZ-AM
Chicago	Bill Berg	Doug Buffone	WCFL
Denver	Mike Nolan	Irv Brown and Ben Martin	KLZ-AM
Los Angeles	Tom Kelly	Rich Marotta	KNX-AM
Michigan	Bob Sherman	Dan Follis	WXYZ-AM
New Jersey	Charley Steiner	Dave Herman and Robert Casciola	WOR-AM
Oakland	Joe Starkey	Lee Grosscup and Bob Murphy	KGO-AM
Philadelphia	Harry Donahue	Vince Papale	WFIL-AM
Tampa Bay	Gene Deckerhoff	Vic Prinzi	WFLA-AM
Washington	Johnny Holliday		WMAL

=== 1984 ===
Team	Play-by-play	Analyst(s)	Flagship station
Arizona	Ray Scott	Bob Buck	KOY
Birmingham	Jim Fyffe	Herb Winches and Dick James	WAPI
Chicago	Duane Dow	Jim Grabowski	WAIT
Denver	Mike Nolan	Ben Martin	KLZ
Houston	John Greer	Ed Biles and Bob Fiscella	KRBE-FM
Jacksonville	Larry Munson	Glenn Fisher	WIVY-FM
Los Angeles	Tom Kelly	Kermit Alexander	KLAC
Memphis	Rick Weaver; John Ward	Gary Wyant and Mike Lawhead	WHBQ
Michigan	Bob Sherman	Dan Follis	WXYZ
New Jersey	Charley Steiner	Dave Herman and Robert Casciola	WOR
New Orleans			WNOE-FM
Oakland	Joe Starkey	Bob Lee and Bob Murphy	KGO
Oklahoma	Jerry Webber	Jack Nixon	KRMG
Philadelphia	Harry Donahue	Vince Papale	WSNI
Pittsburgh	Sam Nover	Jack Ham	WAMO-FM
San Antonio	Jay Howard	Bill Mercer	WOAI
Tampa Bay	Gene Deckerhoff	Vic Prinzi	WFLA
Washington	Johnny Holliday		WMAL

=== 1985 ===
Team	Play-by-play	Analyst(s)	Flagship station
Arizona	Gary Bender	John Moynihan	KJJJ-FM
Baltimore	Scott Garceau	Tom Matte and Bob Bartel	WCAO
Birmingham	Jim Fyffe	Herb Winches and Dick James	WAPI
Denver	Mike Nolan	Irv Brown	KLZ
Houston	John Greer	Ed Biles and Bob Fiscella	KRBE-FM
Jacksonville	Larry Munson	Mel Arthur	WIVY
Los Angeles	Tom Kelly	Rich Marotta	KNX
Memphis	Rick Weaver; John Ward	Dave Woloshin; Paul Hartlage	WHBQ
New Jersey	Charley Steiner	Dave Herman and Robert Casciola	WMCA
Oakland	Joe Starkey	Lee Grosscup	KGO
Orlando	David Steele	Tom Korun and Sam Behr	WKIS
Portland	Ray Scott	Greg Barton	KEX
San Antonio	Jay Howard	Bill Mercer	WOAI
Tampa Bay	Gene Deckerhoff	Vic Prinzi	WFLA

== National coverage ==
On December 9, 1982, the USFL and ABC Radio Networks jointly announced that ABC would do 39 national broadcasts of USFL games, including two playoff games and the league's championship game. ABC agreed to cover two games per week during regular season.

For the Saturday night package in 1983, Shelby Whitefield, Ron Menchine and Steve Grad for the commentators. Other announcers for ABC Radio's USFL coverage included:

- Bob Buck (play-by-play)
- Dick Butkus (color commentary)
- Don Chevrier (play-by-play, beginning in 1984)
- Johnny Holliday (play-by-play, beginning in 1984)
- Paul Hornung (color commentary)
- Marv Levy (color commentary)
- Dan Lovett (color commentary)
- Fred Manfra (play-by-play)
- Craig Morton (color commentary)

For the playoff semi finals in 1984, Johnny Holliday and Paul Hornung called Los Angeles/Arizona game on Saturday while Fred Manfra and Dan Lovett called the Birmingham/Philadelphia game. Meanwhile, the championship game the following week (Philadelphia/Arizona) was called by Fred Manfra and Paul Hornung.

== Sources ==
- 1983
- 1984
- 1985
- USFL Local Announcers
