= Vic Prinzi =

American football player and announcer (1936–1998)

Victor C. Prinzi (April 28, 1936 - January 14, 1998) was a professional American football player for the New York Giants and the Denver Broncos and did color commentary with Gene Deckerhoff for FSU football games. He was also a friend and former college football (starting quarterback and defensive back) teammate of Burt Reynolds at Florida State University, after whom a character in The Cannonball Run was named. Vic Prinzi died four-month's after being diagnosed with lung cancer on January 14, 1998, at his home in Tampa, Florida.

== See also ==
- United States Football League on the radio
