= Bramblett =

Bramblett is a surname. Notable people with the surname include:

- Earl Bramblett (1942−2003), American mass murderer
- Ernest K. Bramblett (1901−1966), American politician
- Randall Bramblett (born 1948), American musician and singer-songwriter
- Rod Bramblett (1965–2019), American sportscaster
