= 2025 Tampa Bay Buccaneers season =

50th season in franchise history

- Owner: The Glazer family
- General manager: Jason Licht
- Head coach: Todd Bowles
- Home stadium: Raymond James Stadium

Results
- Record: 8–9
- Division place: 2nd NFC South
- Playoffs: Did not qualify
- Pro Bowlers: OT Tristan Wirfs; FS Antoine Winfield Jr.

Uniform
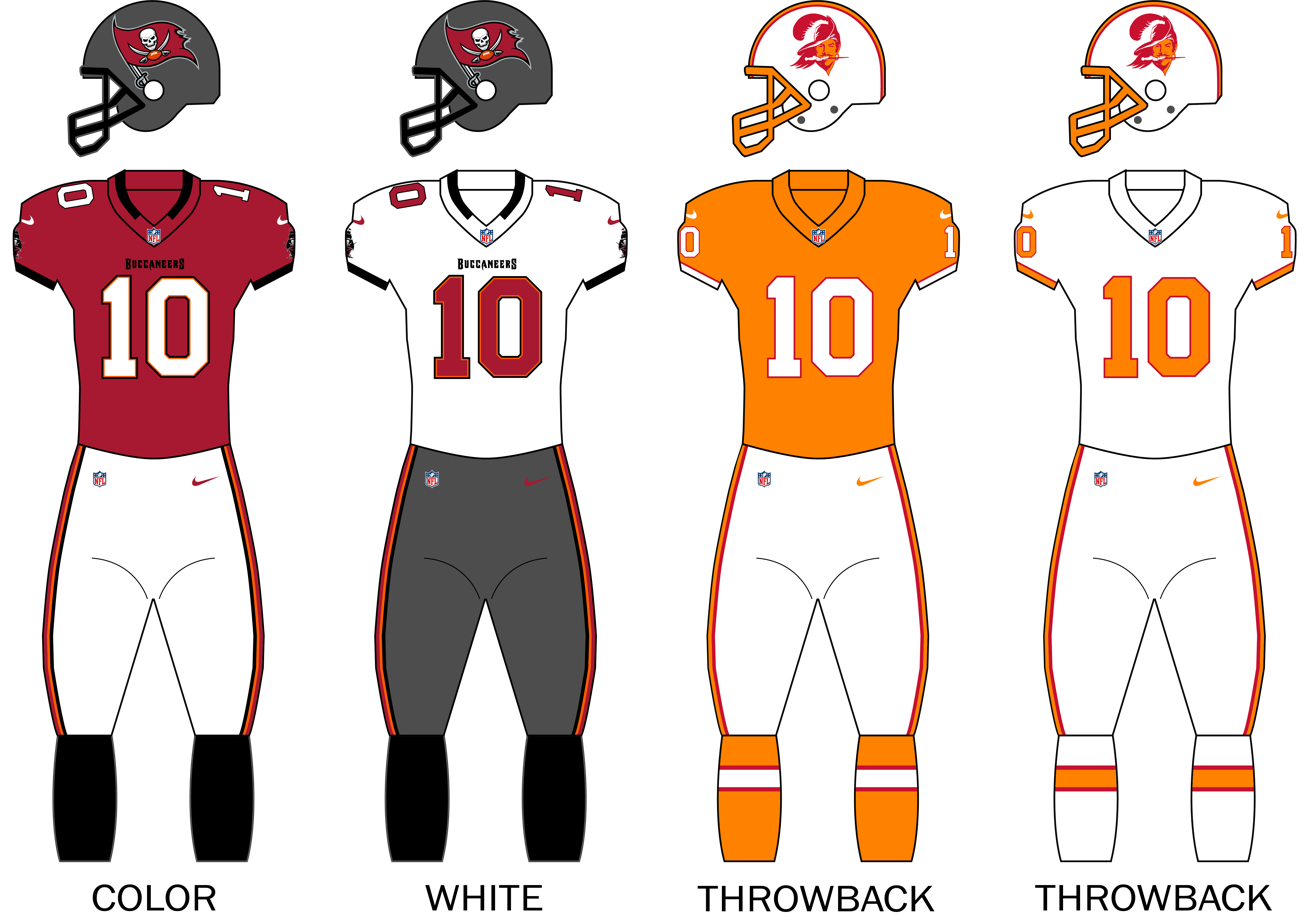

The 2025 season was the Tampa Bay Buccaneers' 50th in the National Football League (NFL), their 12th under the leadership of general manager Jason Licht, their 28th playing their home games at Raymond James Stadium and their fourth under head coach Todd Bowles. They entered the season as four-time defending NFC South champions. This was the Buccaneers' fourth straight season with a new offensive coordinator, as their previous one, Liam Coen, was hired by the Jacksonville Jaguars to be their head coach. While the Buccaneers raced out to a promising 6–2 start which was their best start since 2021, a number of key injuries, defensive breakdowns, ineffective coaching, and a decline in quarterback Baker Mayfield's performance caused the Buccaneers to lose seven out of their next eight games after their bye week and dropping their record to 7–9. This late-season collapse caused the Buccaneers to fail to improve or match their 10–7 record from 2024 after a Week 16 loss to the Carolina Panthers and they suffered their first losing season since 2022 after a loss to the Miami Dolphins the following week. Despite defeating the Panthers in Week 18 to finish the regular season at 8–9, the Buccaneers were eliminated from playoff contention the following day when the Atlanta Falcons defeated the New Orleans Saints, missing the playoffs for the first time since 2019. Atlanta's win forced a three-way tie that gave Carolina the division based on head-to-head advantage.

It also was the third time in franchise history they missed the playoffs after losing in the wild card round at home in the NFL playoffs the previous season (2006 and 2008).

The Buccaneers wore their orange "Creamsicle" throwback uniforms and "Bucco Bruce" helmets in prime time against Atlanta in Week 15. The Falcons also wore their throwback uniforms as the away team. To celebrate the franchise's 50th season, Tampa Bay debuted a second throwback uniform in Week 3 against the Jets. This white-on-white combination replicates their 1976 regular season uniforms, consisting of white trousers and white jerseys with orange numerals outlined in red. Tampa Bay wore them again at Seattle in Week 5. The Seahawks, also celebrating their 50th season, wore their throwbacks for the game, and the Buccaneers followed suit as the road team. The ′76 uniforms were widely praised, and the Bucs won two out of the three games in which they were used.

The season began with the team's first 3–0 start since 2005 and first 5–1 start since 2021. Tampa Bay became the first team in NFL history to win their first four games with game-winning scores in the final minute, and the first team with four wins by 3 or fewer points in their first five games. Injuries took a toll on the team, as Mike Evans (hamstring and broken clavicle) missed nine games, and snapped his streak of 11 consecutive seasons with 1,000 receiving yards. Bucky Irving, Chris Godwin, Jalen McMillan, and Baker Mayfield all piled up injuries, through Mayfield managed to start all 17 games. Mayfield's injuries were later disclosed to be more extensive, and included a sprained MCL, a sprained PCL, biceps contusion, a left shoulder injury, a knee injury, and an illness. At the conclusion of the regular season, head coach Todd Bowles was considered by some experts to be on the "hot seat", however, he was ultimately retained. Several assistant coaches were fired including first year Offensive coordinator Josh Grizzard, Thomas McGaughey, Thad Lewis, Kevin Ross and Charlie Strong. In addition, 87-year old Tom Moore, whose coaching career in college and NFL totaled 65 years (including 47 seasons in the NFL; the last seven with the Bucs) announced his retirement.

This would also be the final season for longtime wide receiver Mike Evans, as he was subsequently released in free agency and signed with the San Francisco 49ers.

The Tampa Bay Buccaneers drew an average home attendance of 67,202, the 20th-highest of all NFL teams.

== Draft ==
2025 Tampa Bay Buccaneers draft selections
Round	Selection	Player	Position	College	Notes
1	19	Emeka Egbuka	WR	Ohio State	
2	53	Benjamin Morrison	CB	Notre Dame	
3	84	Jacob Parrish	CB	Kansas State	
4	121	David Walker	OLB	Central Arkansas	
5	157	Elijah Roberts	DE	SMU	
6	196	Traded to the Detroit Lions (Note: The Buccaneers traded a sixth-round selection (196th overall), a 2024 sixth-round selection and CB Carlton Davis to the Detroit Lions in exchange for a 2024 third-round selection (92nd overall).)			
7	235	Tez Johnson	WR	Oregon	

Draft trades

2025 Tampa Bay Buccaneers undrafted free agents
Name	Position	College	Ref.
Connor Bazelak	QB	Bowling Green	
John Bullock	LB	Nebraska	
Ben Chukwuma	OT	Georgia State	
Ryan Coe	K	California	
Garrett Greene	WR	West Virginia	
Nash Hutmacher	DT	Nebraska	
Anthony Landphere	TE	Memphis	
Jake Majors	C	Texas	
Roman Parodie	CB	Ohio	
Warren Peeples Jr.	OLB	Southeastern Louisiana	
J. J. Roberts	S	Marshall	
Shilo Sanders	S	Colorado	
Ben Scott	G	Nebraska	
Desmond Watson	DT	Florida	
Josh Williams	RB	LSU	
Nick Jackson	LB	Iowa	
Dvon J-Thomas	DL	Penn State	

== Staff ==
2025 Tampa Bay Buccaneers staff
Front office: Co-owner/co-chairman – Bryan Glazer; Co-owner/co-chairman – Edward Glazer; Co-owner/co-chairman – Joel Glazer; Co-owner/president – Darcie Glazer Kassewitz; Co-owner – Avram Glazer; Co-owner – Kevin Glazer; General manager – Jason Licht; Senior director of football operations – Shelton Quarles; Assistant general manager – Mike Greenberg; Assistant general manager – Rob McCartney; Vice president of player personnel – Mike Biehl; Senior personnel executive – Byron Kiefer; Vice president of player engagement – Duke Preston; Vice president of football research – Jacqueline Davidson; Senior advisor to the general manager – Bruce Arians; Director of player personnel – Shane Scannell; Assistant director of pro scouting – Sean Conley; Assistant director of pro scouting – Donovan Cotton; Director of college scouting – Tony Hardie; Director of football research - Zach Beistline; Head coaches: Head coach – Todd Bowles; Offensive coaches: Offensive coordinator – Josh Grizzard; Pass game coordinator – Kefense Hynson; Quarterbacks – Thad Lewis; Running backs – Skip Peete; Wide receivers – Bryan McClendon; Tight ends – Justin Peelle; Assistant tight ends – Jeff Kastl; Run game coordinator/offensive line – Kevin Carberry; Offensive line – Brian Picucci; Senior offensive assistant – Tom Moore	Defensive coaches: Pass game coordinator – George Edwards; Defensive line – Charlie Strong; Run game coordinator/outside linebackers – Larry Foote; Inside linebackers - Mike Caldwell; Cornerbacks – Kevin Ross; Safeties – Nick Rapone; Assistant secondary – Tim Atkins; Assistant secondary – Rashad Johnson; Defensive quality control – Joey Fitzgerald; Special teams coaches: Special teams coordinator – Thomas McGaughey; Defensive/special teams assistant – Keith Tandy; Senior manager of coaching operations – Sarah Evans; Strength and conditioning: Head strength and conditioning – Anthony Piroli; Assistant strength and conditioning – Cory Bichey; Assistant strength and conditioning – Chad Wade; Assistant strength and conditioning – DeAndre Ward Sr; Director of rehabilitation/performance – Maral Javadifar

== Final roster ==
2025 Tampa Bay Buccaneers roster
Quarterbacks (QB): 16 Connor Bazelak; 10 Teddy Bridgewater; 6 Baker Mayfield; Running backs (RB): 7 Bucky Irving; 44 Sean Tucker; 1 Rachaad White; Wide receivers (WR): 2 Emeka Egbuka; 13 Mike Evans; 14 Chris Godwin; 19 Kameron Johnson; 15 Tez Johnson; 11 Jalen McMillan; 17 Sterling Shepard; Tight ends (TE): 82 Devin Culp; 87 Payne Durham; 88 Cade Otton	Offensive linemen (OL): 62 Graham Barton C; 70 Ben Chukwuma LT; 65 Dan Feeney G; 67 Luke Goedeke RT; 72 Luke Haggard RT; 77 Charlie Heck RT; 60 Michael Jordan LG; 79 Elijah Klein RG; 78 Tristan Wirfs LT; Defensive linemen (DL): 96 Greg Gaines NT; 90 Logan Hall DE; 94 Calijah Kancey DE; 95 Elijah Roberts DE; 92 Elijah Simmons NT; 50 Vita Vea NT	Linebackers (LB): 43 Chris Braswell OLB; 54 Lavonte David ILB; 8 SirVocea Dennis ILB; 0 YaYa Diaby OLB; 45 Deion Jones ILB; 98 Anthony Nelson OLB; 5 Haason Reddick OLB; 3 Anthony Walker Jr. ILB; 58 Markees Watts OLB; Defensive backs (DB): 35 Jamel Dean CB; 48 J. T. Gray S; 32 Josh Hayes CB; 29 Christian Izien SS; 21 Benjamin Morrison CB; 25 Jacob Parrish CB; 23 Tykee Smith SS; 22 Kindle Vildor CB; 31 Antoine Winfield Jr. FS; 38 Rashad Wisdom FS; Special teams (ST): 86 Evan Deckers LS; 9 Riley Dixon P; 4 Chase McLaughlin K	Practice squad: 39 Marcus Banks S; 52 C. J. Brewer DE; 97 Adam Gotsis DE; 85 Garrett Greene WR; 34 Bryce Hall CB; 89 Dennis Houston WR; 64 Nash Hutmacher NT; 53 Nick Jackson ILB; 93 Jayson Jones NT (PS/I); 59 Mohamed Kamara OLB; 74 Tyler McLellan RT (PS/I); 71 Lorenz Metz LT (IPP); 91 Jason Pierre-Paul OLB; 66 Ben Scott C; 84 Tanner Taula TE; 56 Benton Whitley OLB; 28 Damarion Williams CB; 18 Josh Williams RB; 49 Owen Wright RB; Reserve: 68 Ben Bredeson LG (IR); 41 Ko Kieft TE (IR); 69 Cody Mauch RG (IR); 27 Zyon McCollum CB (IR); 36 J. J. Roberts S (IR); 80 Jaden Smith WR (IR); 51 David Walker OLB (IR); Rookies in italics 53 active, 7 reserve, 17 practice squad (2 exempt)

== Preseason ==
The Buccaneers' preseason opponents and schedule were announced in May, in conjunction with the release of the regular season schedule.

Week	Date	Opponent	Result	Record	Venue	Recap
1	August 9	Tennessee Titans	W 29–7	1–0	Raymond James Stadium	Recap
2	August 16	at Pittsburgh Steelers	W 17–14	2–0	Acrisure Stadium	Recap
3	August 23	Buffalo Bills	L 19–23	2–1	Raymond James Stadium	Recap

== Regular season ==
=== Schedule ===
Week	Date	Opponent	Result	Record	Venue	Recap
1	September 7	at **Atlanta Falcons**	**W** 23–20	1–0	Mercedes-Benz Stadium	Recap
2	September 15	at Houston Texans	**W** 20–19	2–0	NRG Stadium	Recap
3	September 21	New York Jets	**W** 29–27	3–0	Raymond James Stadium	Recap
4	September 28	Philadelphia Eagles	**L** 25–31	3–1	Raymond James Stadium	Recap
5	October 5	at Seattle Seahawks	**W** 38–35	4–1	Lumen Field	Recap
6	October 12	San Francisco 49ers	**W** 30–19	5–1	Raymond James Stadium	Recap
7	October 20	at Detroit Lions	**L** 9–24	5–2	Ford Field	Recap
8	October 26	at **New Orleans Saints**	**W** 23–3	6–2	Caesars Superdome	Recap
9	Bye					
10	November 9	New England Patriots	**L** 23–28	6–3	Raymond James Stadium	Recap
11	November 16	at Buffalo Bills	**L** 32–44	6–4	Highmark Stadium	Recap
12	November 23	at Los Angeles Rams	**L** 7–34	6–5	SoFi Stadium	Recap
13	November 30	Arizona Cardinals	**W** 20–17	7–5	Raymond James Stadium	Recap
14	December 7	**New Orleans Saints**	**L** 20–24	7–6	Raymond James Stadium	Recap
15	December 11	**Atlanta Falcons**	**L** 28–29	7–7	Raymond James Stadium	Recap
16	December 21	at **Carolina Panthers**	**L** 20–23	7–8	Bank of America Stadium	Recap
17	December 28	at Miami Dolphins	**L** 17–20	7–9	Hard Rock Stadium	Recap
18	January 3	**Carolina Panthers**	**W** 16–14	8–9	Raymond James Stadium	Recap

Note: Intra-division opponents are in bold text.

=== Game summaries ===
==== Week 1: at Atlanta Falcons ====
Week 1: Tampa Bay Buccaneers at Atlanta Falcons – Game summary

Quarter	1	2	3	4	Total
**Buccaneers**	0	10	7	6	**23**
Falcons	7	3	3	7	**20**

at Mercedes-Benz Stadium, Atlanta, Georgia

- Date: September 7
- Game time: 1:00 p.m. EDT
- Game weather: None (retractable roof closed)
- Game attendance: 71,610
- Referee: Land Clark
- TV announcers (Fox): Kenny Albert, Jonathan Vilma and Megan Olivi
- Recap, Game Book

Game information

**First quarter**

- ATL – Bijan Robinson 50-yard pass from Michael Penix Jr. (Younghoe Koo kick), 13:14. Falcons 7–0. **Drive: 3 plays, 65 yards, 1:46.**

**Second quarter**

- TB – Chase McLaughlin 48-yard field goal, 10:17. Falcons 7–3. **Drive: 16 plays, 61 yards, 8:07.**
- TB – Emeka Egbuka 30-yard pass from Baker Mayfield (Chase McLaughlin kick), 6:53. Buccaneers 10–7. **Drive: 5 plays, 52 yards, 2:04.**
- ATL – Younghoe Koo 41-yard field goal, 0:53. Tied 10–10. **Drive: 13 plays, 48 yards, 6:00.**

**Third quarter**

- TB – Bucky Irving 9-yard pass from Baker Mayfield (Chase McLaughlin kick), 7:26. Buccaneers 17–10. **Drive: 5 plays, 32 yards, 2:13.**
- ATL – Younghoe Koo 36-yard field goal, 0:20. Buccaneers 17–13. **Drive: 11 plays, 53 yards, 7:06.**

**Fourth quarter**

- ATL – Michael Penix Jr. 4-yard run (Younghoe Koo kick), 2:17. Falcons 20–17. **Drive: 18 plays, 91 yards, 8:46.**
- TB – Emeka Egbuka 25-yard pass from Baker Mayfield (kick failed, hit left upright), 0:59. Buccaneers 23–20. **Drive: 5 plays, 63 yards, 1:18.**

**Top passers**

- TB – Baker Mayfield – 17/32, 167 yards, 3 TD
- ATL – Michael Penix Jr. – 27/42, 298 yards, TD

**Top rushers**

- TB – Baker Mayfield – 5 rushes, 39 yards
- ATL – Tyler Allgeier – 10 rushes, 24 yards

**Top receivers**

- TB – Emeka Egbuka – 4 receptions, 67 yards, 2 TD
- ATL – Bijan Robinson – 6 receptions, 100 yards, TD

Tampa Bay opened their 50th season at division rival Atlanta. Rookie wide receiver Emeka Egbuka caught two touchdown passes in his NFL debut, including the go-ahead score with 59 seconds left in regulation. Quarterback Baker Mayfield threw for 167 yards and three touchdowns, as the Buccaneers snapped a two-game losing streak against the Falcons. It was Tampa Bay's franchise record-extending fifth consecutive win on opening day.

Tampa Bay clung to a 17–13 lead in the fourth quarter. Michael Penix Jr. drove the Falcons 91 yards in 18 plays, consuming almost nine minutes. On a 4th-and-goal at the 4-yard line, Penix scrambled up the middle, and Calijah Kancey grabbed him by the ankles. But Penix was able to break the plane by mere inches for the touchdown before his knee hit the ground. Atlanta went ahead 20–17 with 2:17 left. Mayfield swiftly drove the Buccaneers down to the field and re-took the lead 23–20. After he connected to Egbuka for a 25-yard touchdown catch, however, Chase McLaughlin's extra point attempt hit the left upright, and fell no good. Trailing by only 3 in the final minute, Penix drove the Falcons to the Tampa Bay 26-yard line. Younghoe Koo lined up for a field goal attempt with 6 seconds remaining to potentially tie the game and force overtime. Koo's kick sailed wide right and Tampa Bay held on for the victory.

The Buccaneers were the only team in the NFC South to win on opening week, giving them sole possession of first place in their division. It was later confirmed that Egbuka was only the second player since the merger to score a game-winning touchdown in the final minute of regulation or overtime in his first NFL game.

==== Week 2: at Houston Texans ====
Week 2: Tampa Bay Buccaneers at Houston Texans – Game summary

Quarter	1	2	3	4	Total
**Buccaneers**	7	7	0	6	**20**
Texans	10	0	0	9	**19**

at NRG Stadium, Houston, Texas

- Date: September 15
- Game time: 7:00 p.m. EDT/6:00 p.m. CDT
- Game weather: None (retractable roof closed)
- Game attendance: 71,580
- Referee: Shawn Hochuli
- TV announcers (ESPN/ABC): Joe Buck, Troy Aikman, Lisa Salters and Laura Rutledge
- Recap, Game Book

Game information

**First quarter**

- HOU – Nico Collins 29-yard pass from C. J. Stroud (Ka'imi Fairbairn kick), 11:58. Texans 7–0. **Drive: 6 plays, 64 yards, 3:07.**
- TB – Ryan Miller 20-yard pass from Baker Mayfield (Chase McLaughlin kick), 7:12. Tied 7–7. **Drive: 9 plays, 65 yards, 4:41.**
- HOU – Ka'imi Fairbairn 35-yard field goal, 3:25. Texans 10–7. **Drive: 7 plays, 49 yards, 3:47.**

**Second quarter**

- TB – Emeka Egbuka 15-yard pass from Baker Mayfield (Chase McLaughlin kick), 9:41. Buccaneers 14–10. **Drive: 14 plays, 77 yards, 8:44.**

**Third quarter**

- No scoring plays

**Fourth quarter**

- HOU – Ka'imi Fairbairn 53-yard field goal, 5:22. Buccaneers 14–13. **Drive: 4 plays, 0 yards, 0:54.**
- HOU – Nick Chubb 25-yard run (pass failed), 2:10. Texans 19–14. **Drive: 2 plays, 26 yards, 0:50.**
- TB – Rachaad White 2-yard run (pass failed), 0:06. Buccaneers 20–19. **Drive: 11 plays, 80 yards, 2:04.**

**Top passers**

- TB – Baker Mayfield – 25/38, 215 yards, 2 TD
- HOU – C. J. Stroud – 13/24, 207 yards, TD

**Top rushers**

- TB – Bucky Irving – 17 rushes, 71 yards
- HOU – Nick Chubb – 12 rushes, 43 yards, TD

**Top receivers**

- TB – Mike Evans – 5 receptions, 56 yards
- HOU – Nico Collins – 3 receptions, 52 yards, TD

Tampa Bay faced the Texans on Monday Night Football. Rachaad White's 2-yard touchdown run with 6 seconds left gave the Buccaneers a 20–19 victory. Tampa Bay started 2–0 for a franchise-record fifth straight season, won in Week 2 for the ninth consecutive season, and recorded their first-ever win in Houston, dating back to the days of the Houston Oilers. The Buccaneers snapped a six-game losing streak in regular season primetime games. It was their first Monday night victory since the 2023 Wild Card round, and their first road victory on Monday night since 2020.

Baker Mayfield threw two touchdown passes in the first half, building a 14–10 halftime lead. The game turned into a defensive battle, however, as their next seven possessions came up empty. A string of miscues in the second half kept Houston in the game. Chase McLaughlin missed a field goal (hit the upright), Mayfield suffered a fumble (recovered by the Bucs), Riley Dixon had a punt blocked, and the special teams gave a up a big punt return by Jaylin Noel. With 2:10 left in regulation, Nick Chubb scored a 25-yard touchdown run, and Houston took a 19–14 lead.

With all three timeouts plus the two-minute warning, Baker Mayfield drove the Buccaneers down the field for the winning score. With 1:24 to go, facing 4th-and-10 at their own 32-yard line, Mayfield avoided a sack, escaped the pocket, and scrambled 15 yards for a first down. Bucky Irving, who led the team in rushing yards, then caught a short pass and avoided multiple tackles for a 22-yard gain. After quick completions to Irving, Mike Evans, and Cade Otton, Tampa Bay was looking at a 2nd-and-goal at the 2-yard line with 9 seconds on the clock. White's 2-yard run up the middle was the game-winner.

Tampa Bay became the first team to win back-to-back road games with go-ahead touchdowns in the final minute since the 1999 Miami Dolphins. Additionally, Mayfield became the first quarterback since Brett Favre in 1999 to lead game-winning touchdown drives in the final 2:30 of back-to-back games. The Buccaneers joined the 1979 Browns and 1988 49ers as the only teams in NFL history to win the first two games of the season on the road by 3 or fewer points.

==== Week 3: vs. New York Jets ====
Week 3: New York Jets at Tampa Bay Buccaneers – Game summary

Quarter	1	2	3	4	Total
Jets	3	3	0	21	**27**
**Buccaneers**	3	17	3	6	**29**

at Raymond James Stadium, Tampa, Florida

- Date: September 21
- Game time: 1:00 p.m. EDT
- Game weather: Cloudy, 88 °F (31 °C)
- Game attendance: 62,872
- Referee: Adrian Hill
- TV announcers (Fox): Kenny Albert, Jonathan Vilma and Megan Olivi
- Recap, Game Book

Game information

**First quarter**

- NYJ – Nick Folk 38-yard field goal, 8:51. Jets 3–0. **Drive: 11 plays, 51 yards, 6:09.**
- TB – Chase McLaughlin 54-yard field goal, 2:20. Tied 3–3. **Drive: 9 plays, 33 yards, 6:31.**

**Second quarter**

- NYJ – Nick Folk 42-yard field goal, 14:01. Jets 6–3. **Drive: 6 plays, 39 yards, 3:19.**
- TB – Mike Evans 5-yard pass from Baker Mayfield (Chase McLaughlin kick), 11:15. Buccaneers 10–6. **Drive: 7 plays, 77 yards, 2:46.**
- TB – Chase McLaughlin 33-yard field goal, 1:43. Buccaneers 13–6. **Drive: 5 plays, 18 yards, 1:09.**
- TB – Jamel Dean 55-yard interception return (Chase McLaughlin kick), 0:17. Buccaneers 20–6.

**Third quarter**

- TB – Chase McLaughlin 28-yard field goal, 5:51. Buccaneers 23–6. **Drive: 16 plays, 67 yards, 9:09.**

**Fourth quarter**

- NYJ – Garrett Wilson 11-yard pass from Tyrod Taylor (Nick Folk kick), 10:12. Buccaneers 23–13. **Drive: 10 plays, 80 yards, 3:54.**
- TB – Chase McLaughlin 55-yard field goal, 6:13. Buccaneers 26–13. **Drive: 8 plays, 36 yards, 3:59.**
- NYJ – Allen Lazard 4-yard pass from Tyrod Taylor (Nick Folk kick), 3:40. Buccaneers 26–20. **Drive: 11 plays, 73 yards, 2:33.**
- NYJ – Will McDonald IV 50-yard blocked kick return (Nick Folk kick), 1:49. Jets 27–26. **Drive: 6 plays, 40 yards, 1:51.**
- TB – Chase McLaughlin 36-yard field goal, 0:00. Buccaneers 29–27. **Drive: 7 plays, 48 yards, 1:49.**

**Top passers**

- NYJ – Tyrod Taylor – 26/36, 197 yards, 2 TD, INT
- TB – Baker Mayfield – 19/29, 233 yards, TD

**Top rushers**

- NYJ – Tyrod Taylor – 8 rushes, 48 yards
- TB – Bucky Irving – 25 rushes, 66 yards

**Top receivers**

- NYJ – Garrett Wilson – 10 receptions, 84 yards, TD
- TB – Emeka Egbuka – 6 receptions, 85 yards

Tampa Bay faced the Jets in their home opener. As part of their 50th season celebration, the Buccaneers wore their special 1976 throwback uniforms. After jumping out to a 23–6 lead, the Buccaneers needed a last-second score to pull off the victory. Chase McLaughlin kicked a 36-yard field goal as time expired to lift the Buccaneers over the Jets by the score of 29–27. Tampa Bay improved to 3–0 for the first time since 2005.

With Luke Goedeke, Tristan Wirfs, and others out, the offensive line saw several shifts and substitutions. The O-line struggled early on. In the first quarter alone, Tampa Bay was flagged for five Holding calls. Eventually the offense settled, and the score was tied 3–3 to start the second quarter.

Baker Mayfield threw a 5-yard touchdown pass to Mike Evans, and Tampa Bay took the lead 10–6 early in the second quarter. With 29 second left in the half, the Jets were at their own 45-yard line, looking to move into field goal range. Tyrod Taylor was under pressure from Jacob Parrish, and his pass attempt to Garrett Wilson was intercepted by Jamel Dean. Tightroping down the sideline, Dean ran it back 55 yards for a touchdown, and the Buccaneers led 20–6 at halftime.

Trailing 23–6, the Jets rallied with two Tyrod Taylor touchdown passes in the fourth quarter. With the score now 26–20, Tampa Bay drove to the Jets 25-yard line at the two-minute warning. Chase McLaughlin lined up for a 43-yard field goal attempt, which would have put Tampa Bay up by 9 points. The kick was blocked by Will McDonald IV who recovered it himself and ran it back 50 yards for a go-ahead touchdown. Trailing 27–26 with 1:41 to go, Mayfield drove the Buccaneers 48 yards in 7 plays. At the Jets 18-yard line with 3 seconds left, McLaughlin's field goal attempt was good this time, and Tampa Bay survived with a last-second win.

The win snapped a five-game losing streak for the Buccaneers in their throwback uniforms. It was their first win in "Creamsicle" style throwback uniforms and "Bucco Bruce" helmets since 2009. Tampa Bay also became the first team in NFL history to win the first three games of the season with game-winning scores in the final minute of all three games.

==== Week 4: vs. Philadelphia Eagles ====
Week 4: Philadelphia Eagles at Tampa Bay Buccaneers – Game summary

Quarter	1	2	3	4	Total
**Eagles**	14	10	7	0	**31**
Buccaneers	3	3	14	5	**25**

at Raymond James Stadium, Tampa, Florida

- Date: September 28
- Game time: 1:00 p.m. EDT
- Game weather: Cloudy, 88 °F (31 °C)
- Game attendance: 64,122
- Referee: Alan Eck
- TV announcers (Fox): Kevin Burkhardt, Tom Brady, Erin Andrews and Tom Rinaldi
- Recap, Game Book

Game information

**First quarter**

- PHI – Sydney Brown 35-yard blocked punt return (Jake Elliott kick), 12:51. Eagles 7–0. **Drive: 5 plays, 28 yards, 2:09.**
- PHI – Dallas Goedert 2-yard pass from Jalen Hurts (Jake Elliott kick), 7:08. Eagles 14–0. **Drive: 8 plays, 73 yards, 4:14.**
- TB – Chase McLaughlin 42-yard field goal, 0:00. Eagles 14–3. **Drive: 12 plays, 49 yards, 7:08.**

**Second quarter**

- PHI – Dallas Goedert 5-yard pass from Jalen Hurts (Jake Elliott kick), 6:10. Eagles 21–3. **Drive: 6 plays, 67 yards, 3:34.**
- PHI – Jake Elliott 39-yard field goal, 0:58. Eagles 24–3. **Drive: 12 plays, 54 yards, 4:02.**
- TB – Chase McLaughlin 65-yard field goal, 0:00. Eagles 24–6. **Drive: 6 plays, 30 yards, 0:58.**

**Third quarter**

- TB – Emeka Egbuka 77-yard pass from Baker Mayfield (Chase McLaughlin kick), 9:51. Eagles 24–13. **Drive: 1 play, 77 yards, 0:13.**
- PHI – Saquon Barkley 6-yard run (Jake Elliott kick), 3:51. Eagles 31–13. **Drive: 6 plays, 25 yards, 3:28.**
- TB – Bucky Irving 72-yard pass from Baker Mayfield (Chase McLaughlin kick), 2:10. Eagles 31–20. **Drive: 4 plays, 86 yards, 1:41.**

**Fourth quarter**

- TB – Chase McLaughlin 58-yard field goal, 12:16. Eagles 31–23. **Drive: 6 plays, 29 yards, 2:36.**
- TB – Braden Mann tackled in the end zone by Kaevon Merriweather for a safety, 0:00. Eagles 31–25.

**Top passers**

- PHI – Jalen Hurts – 15/24, 130 yards, 2 TD
- TB – Baker Mayfield – 22/40, 289 yards, 2 TD, INT

**Top rushers**

- PHI – Jalen Hurts – 9 rushes, 62 yards
- TB – Bucky Irving – 15 rushes, 63 yards

**Top receivers**

- PHI – Dallas Goedert – 4 receptions, 37 yards, 2 TD
- TB – Bucky Irving – 5 receptions, 102 yards, TD

Tampa Bay faced the defending Super Bowl champion Eagles in a matchup of 3–0 teams. The Eagles jumped out to a 24–3 lead in the first half, then held on for a 31–25 victory. Tampa Bay slipped to 3–1, but remained in first place in the NFC South. Chris Godwin and Tristan Wirfs returned to the lineup, but Mike Evans was out due to a hamstring injury.

Philadelphia got on the board early, with a blocked punt returned for a touchdown. Jalen Hurts threw two touchdown passes as the Eagles dominated the first half. The Tampa Bay offense sputtered, with only 99 first-half yards and just 6 points. Chase McLaughlin gave the Buccaneers a spark, kicking a 65-yard field goal as time expired in the half. It was an NFL record for the longest field goal kicked outdoors, and the second-longest field goal in NFL history.

The Tampa Bay defense dominated the Eagles in the second half. Hurts was held to zero pass completions, and the Eagles offense had −1 net yard in the second half. The Buccaneers rallied with explosive plays on offense, but came up just short, with two costly turnovers thwarting the comeback.

Emeka Egbuka's 77-yard touchdown pass was followed by a 72-yard Bucky Irving touchdown. Trailing 31–23 with 7:57 left in regulation, Baker Mayfield drove the Buccaneers to the Philadelphia 11-yard line. On 1st-and-10 from the 11, Mayfield was under pressure, scrambling to his right. His pass was intercepted at the goal line by Jihaad Campbell. Tampa Bay would get the ball back one last time, but ended up turning the over on downs. Philadelphia ran the clock down, took an intentional safety as time expired, and held on to win 31–25.

==== Week 5: at Seattle Seahawks ====
Week 5: Tampa Bay Buccaneers at Seattle Seahawks – Game summary

Quarter	1	2	3	4	Total
**Buccaneers**	3	10	15	10	**38**
Seahawks	0	7	14	14	**35**

at Lumen Field, Seattle, Washington

- Date: October 5
- Game time: 4:05 p.m. EDT/1:05 p.m. PDT
- Game weather: Sunny, 61 °F (16 °C)
- Game attendance: 68,804
- Referee: Craig Wrolstad
- TV announcers (CBS): Kevin Harlan, Trent Green and Melanie Collins
- Recap, Game Book

Game information

**First quarter**

- TB – Chase McLaughlin 30-yard field goal, 7:57. Buccaneers 3–0. **Drive: 11 plays, 68 yards, 7:03.**

**Second quarter**

- TB – Chase McLaughlin 36-yard field goal, 14:08. Buccaneers 6–0. **Drive: 10 plays, 48 yards, 4:57.**
- TB – Rachaad White 7-yard run (Chase McLaughlin kick), 2:09. Buccaneers 13–0. **Drive: 7 plays, 59 yards, 4:15.**
- SEA – Jaxon Smith-Njigba 6-yard pass from Sam Darnold (Jason Myers kick), 0:06. Buccaneers 13–7. **Drive: 10 plays, 54 yards, 2:03.**

**Third quarter**

- SEA – Zach Charbonnet 5-yard run (Jason Myers kick), 13:01. Seahawks 14–13. **Drive: 10 plays, 54 yards, 2:03.**
- TB – Emeka Egbuka 20-yard pass from Baker Mayfield (Baker Mayfield–Emeka Egbuka pass), 7:52. Buccaneers 21–14. **Drive: 9 plays, 77 yards, 5:09.**
- SEA – AJ Barner 2-yard pass from Sam Darnold (Jason Myers kick), 4:12. Tied 21–21. **Drive: 6 plays, 80 yards, 3:40.**
- TB – Rachaad White 1-yard run (Chase McLaughlin kick), 0:19. Buccaneers 28–21. **Drive: 6 plays, 75 yards, 3:53.**

**Fourth quarter**

- SEA – AJ Barner 6-yard pass from Sam Darnold (Jason Myers kick), 9:48. Tied 28–28. **Drive: 10 plays, 51 yards, 5:31.**
- SEA – Tory Horton 21-yard pass from Sam Darnold (Jason Myers kick), 3:18. Seahawks 35–28. **Drive: 8 plays, 99 yards, 4:02.**
- TB – Sterling Shepard 11-yard pass from Baker Mayfield (Chase McLaughlin kick), 1:08. Tied 35–35. **Drive: 5 plays, 70 yards, 2:10.**
- TB – Chase McLaughlin 39-yard field goal, 0:00. Buccaneers 38–35. **Drive: 5 plays, 14 yards, 0:53.**

**Top passers**

- TB – Baker Mayfield – 29/33, 379 yards, 2 TD
- SEA – Sam Darnold – 28/34, 341 yards, 4 TD, INT

**Top rushers**

- TB – Rachaad White – 14 rushes, 41 yards, 2 TD
- SEA – Kenneth Walker III – 10 rushes, 86 yards

**Top receivers**

- TB – Emeka Egbuka – 7 receptions, 163 yards, TD
- SEA – Jaxon Smith-Njigba – 8 receptions, 132 yards, TD

Tampa Bay visited Seattle in Week 5. With both clubs celebrating their respective 50th seasons, both teams wore throwback uniforms. Tampa Bay wore their 1976 "Creamsicle" uniforms and Bucco Bruce helmets for the second time in three weeks. Quarterback Baker Mayfield threw for 379 yards, two touchdown passes, and a two-point conversion pass, as the Buccaneers defeated the Seahawks in a shootout. The game was described as one of the best games of the season thus far. Mayfield and Seattle quarterback Sam Darnold were the 1st and 3rd pick, respectively, of the 2018 NFL draft. After parting from their original teams, the two briefly played together at Carolina in 2022, and were experiencing career resurgence with their new clubs.

With Mike Evans still out, and Bucky Irving also inactive, rookie wide receiver Emeka Egbuka stood out on offense, with 163 yards receiving, one touchdown catch, and a two-point conversion catch. Egbuka became the first player in NFL history with 25+ receptions, 400+ yards receiving, and 5 or more touchdown receptions in his first five career games. Late in the third quarter, on a 3rd-and-13, Egbuka hauled in a 57-yard bomb all the way down to the Seattle 2-yard line, which set up a Rachaad White touchdown run.

Seattle and Tampa Bay traded touchdowns on seven consecutive drives at one point. The score was tied 28–28 with 7:28 left in the fourth quarter. Riley Dixon pinned Seattle back at their own 1-yard line, but Sam Darnold drove the Seahawks 99 yards in eight plays. Seattle took the lead with a Tory Horton touchdown catch with 4:02 remaining. Mayfield made quick work, however, driving Tampa Bay 70 yards in five plays, capping the drive off with an 11-yard touchdown pass to Sterling Shepard with 1:08 to go.

With the score tied 35–35, Seattle took over at their own 23 with 1:03 left in regulation. Cooper Kupp snagged a 9-yard catch on first down, setting up a 2nd-and-1 at the 32-yard line. Darnold was then under heavy pressure by Antoine Winfield Jr., and his pass ricocheted off of the helmet of Logan Hall. Lavonte David intercepted the pass at the Seattle 35-yard line. With a few handoffs to Rachaad White, Tampa Bay was able to run the clock down. Chase McLaughlin, who had been listed as ill prior to the game, kicked a 39-yard field goal as time expired, and the Buccaneers won 38–35.

Mayfield set a mark as the first quarterback to have 375 passing yards and fewer than 5 incompletions in a regular season game. Tampa Bay also became the first team whose first four wins came by game-winning scores in the final minute, and the first team with four wins by 3 or fewer points in their first five games.

==== Week 6: vs. San Francisco 49ers ====
Week 6: San Francisco 49ers at Tampa Bay Buccaneers – Game summary

Quarter	1	2	3	4	Total
49ers	3	13	3	0	**19**
**Buccaneers**	7	13	7	3	**30**

at Raymond James Stadium, Tampa, Florida

- Date: October 12
- Game time: 4:25 p.m. EDT
- Game weather: Clear, 82 °F (28 °C)
- Game attendance: 62,411
- Referee: Carl Cheffers
- TV announcers (CBS): Jim Nantz, Tony Romo and Tracy Wolfson
- Recap, Game Book

Game information

**First quarter**

- TB – Rachaad White 2-yard run (Chase McLaughlin kick), 9:54. Buccaneers 7–0. **Drive: 2 plays, 12 yards, 0:43.**
- SF – Eddy Pineiro 52-yard field goal, 7:54. Buccaneers 7–3. **Drive: 5 plays, 36 yards, 2:00.**

**Second quarter**

- SF – Christian McCaffrey 1-yard run (Eddy Piñeiro kick), 10:18. 49ers 10–7. **Drive: 10 plays, 84 yards, 4:44.**
- TB – Sean Tucker 9-yard run (Chase McLaughlin kick), 5:10. Buccaneers 14–10. **Drive: 8 plays, 68 yards, 5:08.**
- SF – Eddy Pineiro 54-yard field goal, 2:05. Buccaneers 14–13. **Drive: 7 plays, 27 yards, 3:05.**
- TB – Kameron Johnson 34-yard pass from Baker Mayfield (run failed), 0:44. Buccaneers 20–13. **Drive: 5 plays, 72 yards, 1:21.**
- SF – Eddy Pineiro 42-yard field goal, 0:02. Buccaneers 20–16. **Drive: 6 plays, 47 yards, 0:42.**

**Third quarter**

- SF – Eddy Pineiro 29-yard field goal, 7:27. Buccaneers 20–19. **Drive: 14 plays, 65 yards, 7:33.**
- TB – Tez Johnson 45-yard pass from Baker Mayfield (Chase McLaughlin kick), 2:40. Buccaneers 27–19. **Drive: 8 plays, 66 yards, 4:47.**

**Fourth quarter**

- TB – Chase McLaughlin 45-yard field goal, 1:55. Buccaneers 30–19. **Drive: 8 plays, 38 yards, 3:48.**

**Top passers**

- SF – Mac Jones – 27/39, 347 yards, 2 INT
- TB – Baker Mayfield – 17/23, 256 yards, 2 TD

**Top rushers**

- SF – Christian McCaffrey – 17 rushes, 54 yards, TD
- TB – Rachaad White – 17 rushes, 65 yards, TD

**Top receivers**

- SF – Kendrick Bourne – 5 receptions, 142 yards
- TB – Kameron Johnson – 4 receptions, 64 yards, TD

Quarterback Baker Mayfield threw for 256 yards and two touchdown passes as Tampa Bay defeated San Francisco 30–19. With key offensive weapons Mike Evans, Chris Godwin, and Bucky Irving out, and Emeka Egbuka leaving the game early with a hamstring injury, Mayfield depended upon the 5th–8th wide receivers on the depth chart. The Buccaneers defense sacked Mac Jones six times and forced two interceptions. The Buccaneers improved to 5–1 on the season, their best start since 2021.

Early in the first quarter, Tampa Bay struck first, as Kindle Vildor intercepted an off-target pass from Mac Jones. Two plays later, Tampa Bay was in the endzone with a 2-yard touchdown run by Rachaad White. Leading 14–13 in the final minute of the first half, Mayfield lofted a pass to a wide open Kameron Johnson, who ran the rest of the way untouched for a 34-yard touchdown. Tampa Bay led 20–16 at halftime.

A pair of spectacular plays by Baker Mayfield in the third quarter broke the game wide open for Tampa Bay. After a 10-yard Holding penalty, the Buccaneers were facing a 3rd-and-14 at their own 41-yard line. In a shotgun formation with a seven-step drop, Mayfield had to duck to avoid two defenders. He slipped out of a potential sack, and scrambled upfield. He then eluded as many as four 49ers defenders, and escaped for a 14-yard gain. He was able to stretch the ball over the line to gain and achieved a first down. Two plays later, Mayfield found rookie Tez Johnson downfield for a diving, fingertip grab and a 45-yard touchdown pass. It was Johnson's first career touchdown reception, and Tampa Bay stretched their lead to 27–19.

With 5:47 left in the fourth quarter, Jamel Dean intercepted Mac Jones at the 14-yard line. It was the second interception thrown by Jones, and it snuffed out any chance of a 49ers rally. Chase McLaughlin tacked on a field goal to make it a two-score lead, and Tampa Bay would go on to win. Unlike their first four wins (which were all by three points or fewer), this was Tampa Bay's first multi-score win since Week 18 of 2024.

==== Week 7: at Detroit Lions ====
Week 7: Tampa Bay Buccaneers at Detroit Lions – Game summary

Quarter	1	2	3	4	Total
Buccaneers	0	3	6	0	**9**
**Lions**	7	7	7	3	**24**

at Ford Field, Detroit, Michigan

- Date: October 20
- Game time: 7:00 p.m. EDT
- Game weather: None (indoor stadium)
- Game attendance: 64,656
- Referee: John Hussey
- TV announcers (ESPN/ABC): Joe Buck, Troy Aikman, Lisa Salters and Laura Rutledge
- Recap, Game Book

Game information

**First quarter**

- DET – Amon-Ra St. Brown 27-yard pass from Jared Goff (Jake Bates kick), 11:59. Lions 7–0. **Drive: 6 plays, 69 yards, 3:01.**

**Second quarter**

- DET – Jahmyr Gibbs 78-yard run (Jake Bates kick), 5:51. Lions 14–0. **Drive: 4 plays, 87 yards, 1:44.**
- TB – Chase McLaughlin 53-yard field goal, 0:00. Lions 14–3. **Drive: 3 plays, 22 yards, 0:21.**

**Third quarter**

- TB – Tez Johnson 22-yard pass from Baker Mayfield (pass failed), 8:49. Lions 14–9. **Drive: 11 plays, 67 yards, 6:11.**
- DET – Jahmyr Gibbs 5-yard run (Jake Bates kick), 4:39. Lions 21–9. **Drive: 7 plays, 73 yards, 4:10.**

**Fourth quarter**

- DET – Jake Bates 58-yard field goal, 10:18. Lions 24–9. **Drive: 4 plays, 0 yards, 1:13.**

**Top passers**

- TB – Baker Mayfield – 28/50, 228 yards, TD, INT
- DET – Jared Goff – 20/29, 241 yards, TD, INT

**Top rushers**

- TB – Rachaad White – 10 rushes, 38 yards
- DET – Jahmyr Gibbs – 17 rushes, 138 yards, 2 TD

**Top receivers**

- TB – Cade Otton – 7 receptions, 65 yards
- DET – Amon-Ra St. Brown – 6 receptions, 86 yards, TD

Tampa Bay traveled to Detroit on Monday Night Football. The Lions defeated the Buccaneers 24–9 behind two touchdowns by Jahmyr Gibbs. The Buccaneers offense struggled, with only 41 yards on the ground, while quarterback Baker Mayfield managed 228 yards and only one touchdown pass. Mike Evans returned to the starting lineup after missing three games with a hamstring injury. However, in the second quarter, Evans suffered a broken collarbone, which would sideline him until Week 15.

==== Week 8: at New Orleans Saints ====
Week 8: Tampa Bay Buccaneers at New Orleans Saints – Game summary

Quarter	1	2	3	4	Total
**Buccaneers**	0	7	10	6	**23**
Saints	0	3	0	0	**3**

at Caesars Superdome, New Orleans, Louisiana

- Date: October 26
- Game time: 4:05 p.m. EDT/3:05 p.m. CDT
- Game weather: None (indoor stadium)
- Game attendance: 70,038
- Referee: Ron Torbert
- TV announcers (Fox): Kenny Albert, Jonathan Vilma and Megan Olivi
- Recap, Game Book

Game information

**First quarter**

- No scoring plays

**Second quarter**

- TB – Anthony Nelson 3-yard interception return (Chase McLaughlin kick), 6:41. Buccaneers 7–0.
- NO – Blake Grupe 48-yard field goal, 0:01. Buccaneers 7–3. **Drive: 6 plays, 15 yards, 0:46.**

**Third quarter**

- TB – Sean Tucker 1-yard run (Chase McLaughlin kick), 10:08. Buccaneers 14–3. **Drive: 10 plays, 73 yards, 4:52.**
- TB – Chase McLaughlin 55-yard field goal, 4:02. Buccaneers 17–3. **Drive: 7 plays, 18 yards, 4:17.**

**Fourth quarter**

- TB – Chase McLaughlin 52-yard field goal, 14:03. Buccaneers 20–3. **Drive: 7 plays, 16 yards, 2:25.**
- TB – Chase McLaughlin 54-yard field goal, 9:26. Buccaneers 23–3. **Drive: 4 plays, 8 yards, 2:18.**

**Top passers**

- TB – Baker Mayfield – 15/24, 152 yards
- NO – Spencer Rattler – 15/21, 136 yards, INT

**Top rushers**

- TB – Sean Tucker – 12 rushes, 42 yards, TD
- NO – Alvin Kamara – 6 rushes, 21 yards

**Top receivers**

- TB – Tez Johnson – 5 receptions, 43 yards
- NO – Rashid Shaheed – 9 receptions, 75 yards

Tampa Bay traveled to division rival New Orleans. Before the game started, Mayfield made comments earlier in the week that suggested the Saints play dirty. The Buccaneers defeated the Saints 23–3 in a mostly defensive battle. Playing without Bucky Irving, Mike Evans, Chris Godwin, Jalen McMillan and others, and with quarterback Baker Mayfield nursing a knee injury, the Buccaneers offense was only average. The defense and special teams units, however, excelled, with Anthony Nelson the standout player for the day. Nelson had 4 tackles, 2 sacks, a forced fumble, and an interception returned for a touchdown. The Buccaneers improved to 6–2 and took a two-game lead in the NFC South as they entered their bye week.

Spencer Rattler started at quarterback for the Saints. On the first drive of the game, Rattler was sacked and fumbled. Though Tampa Bay was not able to score points off of the turnover, the field position battle set Tampa Bay up for a lengthy drive on their next possession. A 17-play, 81-yard drive saw the Buccaneers advance to inside the New Orleans 1-yard line. However, a stiff goal line stand by the Saints resulted in no points. Three plays later, however, the Buccaneers got on the board after all. Rattler rolled out to his right, and his pass was tipped and intercepted by Anthony Nelson at the 3-yard line. He muscled his way into the endzone, and Tampa Bay was up 7–0.

With 1:48 to go in the first half, Rattler completed a pass to Rashid Shaheed; the ball was caught at the 44-yard line, but fumbled at the 47. Antoine Winfield Jr. scooped it up and ran it back for an apparent Tampa Bay touchdown, however, the score was called back over an inadvertent whistle. Tampa Bay retained possession, but lost it on a Baker Mayfield sack with 57 seconds left. New Orleans managed a field goal, and the score was 7–3 at halftime.

Tampa Bay came out in the second half, and put up a 10-play, 73-yard drive, capped off by a touchdown run by Sean Tucker. For the second time, Tampa Bay went for it on a 4th-and-goal inside the 1, this time it was successful. The Buccaneers would tack on three Chase McLaughlin field goals, and put the game out of reach. Rattler was eventually benched for Tyler Shough, who did not fare much better. Tampa Bay won their third straight overall against the Saints, and fourth straight road game in the series (a franchise best). It marked their sixth head-to-head win in the past seven meetings.

==== Week 10: vs. New England Patriots ====
Week 10: New England Patriots at Tampa Bay Buccaneers – Game summary

Quarter	1	2	3	4	Total
**Patriots**	7	7	7	7	**28**
Buccaneers	7	3	6	7	**23**

at Raymond James Stadium, Tampa, Florida

- Date: November 9
- Game time: 1:00 p.m. EST
- Game weather: Cloudy, 82 °F (28 °C)
- Game attendance: 65,492
- Referee: Alex Kemp
- TV announcers (CBS): Jim Nantz, Tony Romo and Tracy Wolfson
- Recap, Game Book

Game information

**First quarter**

- TB – Emeka Egbuka 21-yard pass from Baker Mayfield (Chase McLaughlin kick), 11:23. Buccaneers 7–0. **Drive: 6 plays, 65 yards, 3:37.**
- NE – Kyle Williams 72-yard pass from Drake Maye (Andres Borregales kick), 0:00. Tied 7–7. **Drive: 1 play, 72 yards, 0:11.**

**Second quarter**

- TB – Chase McLaughlin 36-yard field goal, 7:16. Buccaneers 10–7. **Drive: 8 plays, 57 yards, 4:25.**
- NE – Stefon Diggs 1-yard pass from Drake Maye (Andres Borregales kick), 0:00. Patriots 14–10. **Drive: 14 plays, 78 yards, 7:16.**

**Third quarter**

- NE – TreVeyon Henderson 55-yard run (Andres Borregales kick), 14:12. Patriots 21–10. **Drive: 2 plays, 65 yards, 0:48.**
- TB – Tez Johnson 10-yard pass from Baker Mayfield (run failed), 4:12. Patriots 21–16. **Drive: 11 plays, 92 yards, 5:50.**

**Fourth quarter**

- NE – TreVeyon Henderson 69-yard run (Andres Borregales kick), 1:31. Patriots 28–16. **Drive: 2 plays, 70 yards, 0:16.**
- TB – Tez Johnson 11-yard pass from Baker Mayfield (Chase McLaughlin kick), 0:33. Patriots 28–23. **Drive: 7 plays, 65 yards, 0:58.**

**Top passers**

- NE – Drake Maye – 16/31, 270 yards, 2 TD, INT
- TB – Baker Mayfield – 28/43, 273 yards, 3 TD

**Top rushers**

- NE – TreVeyon Henderson – 14 rushes, 147 yards, 2 TD
- TB – Sean Tucker – 9 rushes, 53 yards

**Top receivers**

- NE – Mack Hollins – 6 receptions, 106 yards
- TB – Emeka Egbuka – 6 receptions, 115 yards, TD

Quarterback Baker Mayfield threw for 273 yards and 3 touchdown passes, but it was not enough as Tampa Bay fell to New England 28–23. Patriots running back TreVeyon Henderson rushed for 147 yards, including touchdown runs of 55 yards and 69 yards.

Leading 21–16 with under 6 minutes remaining, Drake Maye drove the Patriots to the Tampa Bay 2-yard line. Looking to put the game out of reach, Maye's pass to the endzone was intercepted by Tykee Smith, resulting in a touchback. Tampa Bay took over at the 20-yard line after the turnover. Trailing by only 5 points, Mayfield drove the Buccaneers to the Patriots 27-yard line. The drive stalled, however, and Tampa Bay wound up turning the ball over on downs. Two plays later, Henderson blasted for a 69-yard touchdown run, and the Patriots held on for the victory.

It was Tampa Bay's fifth loss in six games against New England since 2005. The Buccaneers fell to 6–3, but maintained a 1½-game lead over Carolina, who lost to New Orleans.

==== Week 11: at Buffalo Bills ====
Week 11: Tampa Bay Buccaneers at Buffalo Bills – Game summary

Quarter	1	2	3	4	Total
Buccaneers	3	17	6	6	**32**
**Bills**	7	14	10	13	**44**

at Highmark Stadium, Orchard Park, New York

- Date: November 16
- Game time: 1:00 p.m. EST
- Game weather: Cloudy, 38 °F (3 °C)
- Game attendance: 71,005
- Referee: Alex Moore
- TV announcers (CBS): Ian Eagle, J. J. Watt and Evan Washburn
- Recap, Game Book

Game information

**First quarter**

- TB – Chase McLaughlin 23-yard field goal, 8:54. Buccaneers 3–0. **Drive: 4 plays, 2 yards, 1:32.**
- BUF – Josh Allen 2-yard run (Matt Prater kick), 4:09. Bills 7–3. **Drive: 10 plays, 36 yards, 4:45.**

**Second quarter**

- TB – Baker Mayfield 4-yard run (Chase McLaughlin kick), 12:00. Buccaneers 10–7. **Drive: 11 plays, 69 yards, 7:09.**
- BUF – Tyrell Shavers 43-yard pass from Josh Allen (Matt Prater kick), 8:52. Bills 14–10. **Drive: 6 plays, 67 yards, 3:08.**
- TB – Sean Tucker 43-yard run (Chase McLaughlin kick), 5:37. Buccaneers 17–14. **Drive: 6 plays, 66 yards, 3:15.**
- BUF – Ty Johnson 52-yard pass from Josh Allen (Matt Prater kick), 0:36. Bills 21–17. **Drive: 4 plays, 92 yards, 0:32.**
- TB – Chase McLaughlin 36-yard field goal, 0:00. Bills 21–20. **Drive: 5 plays, 58 yards, 0:36.**

**Third quarter**

- TB – Sean Tucker 6-yard run (pass failed), 7:26. Buccaneers 26–21. **Drive: 7 plays, 43 yards, 3:46.**
- BUF – Matt Prater 39-yard field goal, 5:01. Buccaneers 26–24. **Drive: 5 plays, 25 yards, 2:25.**
- BUF – James Cook 25-yard pass from Josh Allen (Matt Prater kick), 3:48. Bills 31–26. **Drive: 1 play, 25 yards, 0:05.**

**Fourth quarter**

- TB – Sean Tucker 28-yard pass from Baker Mayfield (pass failed), 13:38. Buccaneers 32–31. **Drive: 9 plays, 62 yards, 5:10.**
- BUF – Josh Allen 5-yard run (pass failed), 9:06. Bills 37–32. **Drive: 8 plays, 81 yards, 4:32.**
- BUF – Josh Allen 9-yard run (Matt Prater kick), 2:35. Bills 44–32. **Drive: 8 plays, 85 yards, 4:40.**

**Top passers**

- TB – Baker Mayfield – 16/28, 173 yards, TD, INT
- BUF – Josh Allen – 19/30, 317 yards, 3 TD, 2 INT

**Top rushers**

- TB – Sean Tucker – 19 rushes, 106 yards, 2 TD
- BUF – James Cook – 16 rushes, 48 yards

**Top receivers**

- TB – Sterling Shepard – 4 receptions, 54 yards
- BUF – Tyrell Shavers – 4 receptions, 90 yards, TD

Sean Tucker scored three touchdowns (two rushing, one receiving), and the Buccaneers forced three turnovers, but it was again not enough, as Buffalo defeated Tampa Bay 44–32. Josh Allen accounted for six touchdowns (three touchdown passes and three rushing touchdowns) as the Bills outlasted the Bucs in a game which saw nine lead changes. It was Tampa Bay's third loss in four games.

Baker Mayfield threw for a relatively average 173 yards and one touchdown. But he also rushed for 13 yards and had a touchdown on the ground. The Buccaneers ground game totaled 202 rushing yards, with Tucker the offensive standout for the day. With the loss, the Buccaneers slipped to 6–4, 2–2 against the AFC, and 1–2 against the AFC East. They remained in first place in the NFC South by ½-game over Carolina.

It was only Tampa Bay's fourth-ever visit in fifty seasons to Highmark Stadium. Due to scheduling quirks of the past, the Buccaneers never visited Buffalo for a regular season game until 2009. The Buccaneers fell to 0–4 all-time at the stadium, which is set to close following the completion of New Highmark Stadium.

==== Week 12: at Los Angeles Rams ====
Week 12: Tampa Bay Buccaneers at Los Angeles Rams – Game summary

Quarter	1	2	3	4	Total
Buccaneers	0	7	0	0	**7**
**Rams**	14	17	0	3	**34**

at SoFi Stadium, Inglewood, California

- Date: November 23
- Game time: 8:20 p.m. EST/5:20 p.m. PST
- Game weather: Clear, 63 °F (17 °C) (fixed roof)
- Game attendance: 75,545
- Referee: Clay Martin
- TV announcers (NBC): Mike Tirico, Cris Collinsworth and Melissa Stark
- Recap, Game Book

Game information

**First quarter**

- LAR – Davante Adams 1-yard pass from Matthew Stafford (Harrison Mevis kick), 4:32. Rams 7–0. **Drive: 10 plays, 80 yards, 5:38.**
- LAR – Cobie Durant 50-yard interception return (Harrison Mevis kick), 1:42. Rams 14–0.

**Second quarter**

- LAR – Colby Parkinson 5-yard pass from Matthew Stafford (Harrison Mevis kick), 10:46. Rams 21–0. **Drive: 12 plays, 72 yards, 5:02.**
- TB – Tez Johnson 14-yard pass from Baker Mayfield (Chase McLaughlin kick), 5:03. Rams 21–7. **Drive: 10 plays, 65 yards, 5:43.**
- LAR – Davante Adams 24-yard pass from Matthew Stafford (Harrison Mevis kick), 3:10. Rams 28–7. **Drive: 4 plays, 65 yards, 1:53.**
- LAR – Harrison Mevis 40-yard field goal, 1:02. Rams 31–7. **Drive: 4 plays, 7 yards, 0:37.**

**Third quarter**

- No scoring plays

**Fourth quarter**

- LAR – Harrison Mevis 52-yard field goal, 13:35. Rams 34–7. **Drive: 8 plays, 30 yards, 3:39.**

**Top passers**

- TB – Teddy Bridgewater – 8/15, 62 yards
- LAR – Matthew Stafford – 25/35, 273 yards, 3 TD

**Top rushers**

- TB – Sean Tucker – 12 rushes, 42 yards
- LAR – Kyren Williams – 12 rushes, 46 yards

**Top receivers**

- TB – Emeka Egbuka – 3 receptions, 32 yards
- LAR – Puka Nacua – 7 receptions, 97 yards

Tampa Bay visited the Rams on Sunday Night Football. Quarterback Baker Mayfield left the game with a shoulder injury. Teddy Bridgewater came in at quarterback for the second half. The Buccaneers were routed 34–7, for their third straight loss. They slipped to 6–5 on the season.

==== Week 13: vs. Arizona Cardinals ====
Week 13: Arizona Cardinals at Tampa Bay Buccaneers – Game summary

Quarter	1	2	3	4	Total
Cardinals	0	3	7	7	**17**
**Buccaneers**	0	10	7	3	**20**

at Raymond James Stadium, Tampa, Florida

- Date: November 30
- Game time: 1:00 p.m. EST
- Game weather: Clear, 80 °F (27 °C)
- Game attendance: 61,103
- Referee: Bill Vinovich
- TV announcers (Fox): Kevin Kugler, Daryl Johnston and Allison Williams
- Recap, Game Book

Game information

**First quarter**

- No scoring plays

**Second quarter**

- TB – Chase McLaughlin 25-yard field goal, 8:02. Buccaneers 3–0. **Drive: 10 plays, 63 yards, 5:13.**
- TB – Tristan Wirfs 2-yard pass from Baker Mayfield (Chase McLaughlin kick), 1:36. Buccaneers 10–0. **Drive: 10 plays, 50 yards, 4:34.**
- ARI – Chad Ryland 52-yard field goal, 0:00. Buccaneers 10–3. **Drive: 8 plays, 43 yards, 1:36.**

**Third quarter**

- TB – Bucky Irving 13-yard run (Chase McLaughlin kick), 3:56. Buccaneers 17–3. **Drive: 7 plays, 67 yards, 3:50.**
- ARI – Bam Knight 15-yard pass from Jacoby Brissett (Chad Ryland kick), 0:31. Buccaneers 17–10. **Drive: 6 plays, 72 yards, 3:25.**

**Fourth quarter**

- TB – Chase McLaughlin 57-yard field goal, 8:58. Buccaneers 20–10. **Drive: 4 plays, 0 yards, 1:41.**
- ARI – Trey McBride 15-yard pass from Jacoby Brissett (Chad Ryland kick), 4:58. Buccaneers 20–17. **Drive: 9 plays, 73 yards, 4:00.**

**Top passers**

- ARI – Jacoby Brissett – 29/40, 301 yards, 2 TD
- TB – Baker Mayfield – 18/28, 194 yards, TD

**Top rushers**

- ARI – Bam Knight – 11 rushes, 62 yards
- TB – Bucky Irving – 17 rushes, 61 yards, TD

**Top receivers**

- ARI – Trey McBride – 8 receptions, 82 yards, TD
- TB – Chris Godwin – 3 receptions, 78 yards

Quarterback Baker Mayfield's shoulder injury from Week 12 was diagnosed as a low-grade AC joint sprain of the non-throwing arm. After limited practice during the week, Mayfield was able to start in Week 13 against Arizona. Also returning to the lineup was running back Bucky Irving, who had been sidelined with injuries suffered in Week 4.

Mayfield threw for 194 yards and one touchdown pass as Tampa Bay held off the Arizona Cardinals to win 20–17. The Tampa Bay defense forced two turnovers (1 interception, 1 fumble) and made two critical stops on fourth down to secure the victory. Bucky Irving scored a touchdown run in his return, and in his second game back from injury, Chris Godwin had three catches for 78 yards.

Tampa Bay stretched their lead to 20–10 after a 57-yard field goal by Chase McLaughlin with 8:58 left in regulation. Jacoby Brissett then drove the Cardinals 73 yard in 9 plays. Trey McBride's 15-yard touchdown catch made the score 20–17. Trailing by 3, Arizona got the ball back with 1:49 left on the clock. Facing a 4th-and-2 at their own 17-yard line, Brissett's pass was incomplete, and Arizona turned the ball over on downs.

Tampa Bay snapped a three-game losing streak, and improved to 7–5 on the season. The Cardinals were eliminated from playoff contention, and the Buccaneers finished 3–1 against the NFC West.

==== Week 14: vs. New Orleans Saints ====
Week 14: New Orleans Saints at Tampa Bay Buccaneers – Game summary

Quarter	1	2	3	4	Total
**Saints**	7	0	10	7	**24**
Buccaneers	7	3	7	3	**20**

at Raymond James Stadium, Tampa, Florida

- Date: December 7
- Game time: 1:00 p.m. EST
- Game weather: Cloudy, 73 °F (23 °C)
- Game attendance: 63,125
- Referee: Clete Blakeman
- TV announcers (CBS): Kevin Harlan, Trent Green and Melanie Collins
- Recap, Game Book

Game information

**First quarter**

- NO – Devin Neal 3-yard run (Charlie Smyth kick), 12:24. Saints 7–0. **Drive: 6 plays, 45 yards, 2:36.**
- TB – Bucky Irving 24-yard pass from Baker Mayfield (Chase McLaughlin kick), 7:57. Tied 7–7. **Drive: 7 plays, 67 yards, 4:27.**

**Second quarter**

- TB – Chase McLaughlin 41-yard field goal, 9:11. Buccaneers 10–7. **Drive: 5 plays, 17 yards, 1:57.**

**Third quarter**

- NO – Tyler Shough 34-yard run (Charlie Smyth kick), 11:27. Saints 14–10. **Drive: 3 plays, 47 yards, 1:19.**
- TB – Sean Tucker 1-yard run (Chase McLaughlin kick), 7:37. Buccaneers 17–14. **Drive: 7 plays, 65 yards, 3:50.**
- NO – Charlie Smyth 30-yard field goal, 1:32. Tied 17–17. **Drive: 11 plays, 53 yards, 6:05.**

**Fourth quarter**

- NO – Tyler Shough 13-yard run (Charlie Smyth kick), 8:26. Saints 24–17. **Drive: 9 plays, 53 yards, 4:22.**
- TB – Chase McLaughlin 37-yard field goal, 4:54. Saints 24–20. **Drive: 9 plays, 41 yards, 3:32.**

**Top passers**

- NO – Tyler Shough – 13/20, 144 yards, INT
- TB – Baker Mayfield – 14/30, 122 yards, TD, INT

**Top rushers**

- NO – Devin Neal – 19 rushes, 70 yards, TD
- TB – Bucky Irving – 15 rushes, 55 yards

**Top receivers**

- NO – Devaughn Vele – 3 receptions, 40 yards
- TB – Chris Godwin – 5 receptions, 55 yards

Tampa Bay fell 24–20 to division rival New Orleans. On a rainy, sloppy afternoon, quarterback Baker Mayfield was held to only 122 yards passing. Four times the Buccaneers went for it on a 4th down and short, and failed to convert. Late in the game, a potential game-tying touchdown pass went through the hands of Emeka Egbuka. At the two-minute warning, Deion Jones dropped an interception that would have set the Bucs up at the 40-yard line. Then with 1:27 left, facing 4th-and-4 at the 26, Mayfield's pass to Cade Otton was complete, but he was tackled 1 yard short of the line to gain.

With the loss, the Buccaneers fell to 7–6 and 2–1 against the NFC South. They slipped into a tie with Carolina for first place in the division.

==== Week 15: vs. Atlanta Falcons ====
Week 15: Atlanta Falcons at Tampa Bay Buccaneers – Game summary

Quarter	1	2	3	4	Total
**Falcons**	0	14	0	15	**29**
Buccaneers	7	6	7	8	**28**

at Raymond James Stadium, Tampa, Florida

- Date: December 11
- Game time: 8:15 p.m. EST
- Game weather: Clear, 56 °F (13 °C)
- Game attendance: 64,917
- Referee: Carl Cheffers
- TV announcers (WTVT/Prime Video): Al Michaels, Kirk Herbstreit and Kaylee Hartung
- Recap, Game Book

Game information

**First quarter**

- TB – Sean Tucker 1-yard run (Chase McLaughlin kick), 1:38. Buccaneers 7–0. **Drive: 11 plays, 83 yards, 4:44.**

**Second quarter**

- ATL – Kyle Pitts 8-yard pass from Kirk Cousins (Zane Gonzalez kick), 12:11. Tied 7–7. **Drive: 9 plays, 65 yards, 4:27.**
- TB – Chase McLaughlin 49-yard field goal, 2:04. Buccaneers 10–7. **Drive: 9 plays, 49 yards, 4:25.**
- ATL – Kyle Pitts 17-yard pass from Kirk Cousins (Zane Gonzalez kick), 0:38. Falcons 14–10. **Drive: 4 plays, 65 yards, 1:26.**
- TB – Chase McLaughlin 52-yard field goal, 0:00. Falcons 14–13. **Drive: 5 plays, 40 yards, 0:38.**

**Third quarter**

- TB – Devin Culp 6-yard pass from Baker Mayfield (Chase McLaughlin kick), 6:22. Buccaneers 20–14. **Drive: 9 plays, 90 yards, 5:14.**

**Fourth quarter**

- TB – Chris Godwin 3-yard pass from Baker Mayfield (Chase McLaughlin kick), 13:34. Buccaneers 28–14. **Drive: 4 plays, 25 yards, 1:32.**
- ATL – Bijan Robinson 6-yard run (pass failed), 9:37. Buccaneers 28–20. **Drive: 8 plays, 65 yards, 3:57.**
- ATL – Kyle Pitts 7-yard pass from Kirk Cousins (pass failed), 3:34. Buccaneers 28–26. **Drive: 10 plays, 67 yards, 4:48.**
- ATL – Zane Gonzalez 43-yard field goal, 0:00. Falcons 29–28. **Drive: 9 plays, 45 yards, 1:49.**

**Top passers**

- ATL – Kirk Cousins – 30/44, 373 yards, 3 TD
- TB – Baker Mayfield – 19/34, 277 yards, 2 TD, INT

**Top rushers**

- ATL – Bijan Robinson – 19 rushes, 93 yards, TD
- TB – Bucky Irving – 16 rushes, 60 yards

**Top receivers**

- ATL – Kyle Pitts – 11 receptions, 166 yards, 3 TD
- TB – Mike Evans – 6 receptions, 132 yards

Tampa Bay hosted Atlanta on Thursday Night Football. The Buccaneers wore their "Creamsicle" throwback uniforms, and the Falcons also wore throwbacks. Mike Evans and Jalen McMillan returned the lineup after being on injured reserve, marking the first game all season in which wide receivers Evans, Chris Godwin, McMillan, and Emeka Egbuka all played together. The Buccaneers blew a 14-point lead in the fourth quarter and dropped their third game in their last four against Atlanta. With their fifth loss in their last six games, the Buccaneers fell to 7–7 (2–2 against the NFC South) and slipped to second in the NFC South a half-game behind Carolina.

Baker Mayfield threw for 277 yards and two touchdown passes, while Mike Evans had six catches for a season-high 132 yards. The Bucs took a 28–14 lead with 13:34 left in regulation. But the Falcons scored touchdowns on back-to-back drives, the second coming after a Mayfield interception. Trailing 28–26, Atlanta got the ball back with 1:49 to go. The Bucs defense got a sack on Kirk Cousins, and Falcons found themselves in a 3rd-and-28. Cousins managed a 14-yard pass to Kyle Pitts, which set up a 4th-and-14 at their own 43-yard line. Cousins found David Sills for a 21-yard gain to keep the drive alive. Zane Gonzalez kicked a 43-yard field goal as time expired, and Atlanta won 29–28.

After the game, head coach Todd Bowles called the loss "inexcusable", and blasted his players in a profanity-laced tirade. Three days later, Carolina was upset by New Orleans, which moved Tampa Bay back into first place in the NFC South; the tie was broken based on record against common opponents.

==== Week 16: at Carolina Panthers ====
Week 16: Tampa Bay Buccaneers at Carolina Panthers – Game summary

Quarter	1	2	3	4	Total
Buccaneers	7	3	7	3	**20**
**Panthers**	3	10	7	3	**23**

at Bank of America Stadium, Charlotte, North Carolina

- Date: December 21
- Game time: 1:00 p.m. EST
- Game weather: Partly cloudy, 61 °F (16 °C)
- Game attendance: 73,530
- Referee: Shawn Smith
- TV announcers (Fox): Chris Myers, Mark Schlereth and Jen Hale
- Recap, Game Book

Game information

**First quarter**

- CAR – Ryan Fitzgerald 27-yard field goal, 10:30. Panthers 3–0. **Drive: 9 plays, 56 yards, 4:30.**
- TB – Mike Evans 1-yard pass from Baker Mayfield (Chase McLaughlin kick), 4:01. Buccaneers 7–3. **Drive: 10 plays, 53 yards, 6:29.**

**Second quarter**

- TB – Chase McLaughlin 23-yard field goal, 8:09. Buccaneers 10–3. **Drive: 14 plays, 85 yards, 7:12.**
- CAR – Ryan Fitzgerald 41-yard field goal, 2:06. Buccaneers 10–6. **Drive: 6 plays, 16 yards, 2:19.**
- CAR – Tetairoa McMillan 22-yard pass from Bryce Young (Ryan Fitzgerald kick), 0:07. Panthers 13–10. **Drive: 8 plays, 63 yards, 0:59.**

**Third quarter**

- TB – Sean Tucker 1-yard run (Chase McLaughlin kick), 6:41. Buccaneers 17–13. **Drive: 14 plays, 66 yards, 8:19.**
- CAR – Ja'Tavion Sanders 6-yard pass from Bryce Young (Ryan Fitzgerald kick), 0:08. Panthers 20–17. **Drive: 11 plays, 65 yards, 6:33.**

**Fourth quarter**

- TB – Chase McLaughlin 50-yard field goal, 11:24. Tied 20–20. **Drive: 6 plays, 11 yards, 3:44.**
- CAR – Ryan Fitzgerald 48-yard field goal, 2:20. Panthers 23–20. **Drive: 7 plays, 43 yards, 2:26.**

**Top passers**

- TB – Baker Mayfield – 18/26, 145 yards, TD, INT
- CAR – Bryce Young – 21/32, 191 yards, 2 TD

**Top rushers**

- TB – Bucky Irving – 19 rushes, 71 yards
- CAR – Rico Dowdle – 9 rushes, 29 yards

**Top receivers**

- TB – Emeka Egbuka – 1 reception, 40 yards
- CAR – Tetairoa McMillan – 6 receptions, 73 yards, TD

Tampa Bay faced division rival Carolina, with first place in the NFC South on the line. In the first of two meetings in three weeks, the Panthers defeated the Buccaneers 23–20, to take the lead in the division standings.

The game was tied 20–20 after Chase McLaughlin kicked a 50-yard goal into the wind with 11:24 remaining in regulation. Carolina managed a field goal and a 23–20 lead just before the two-minute warning. The Buccaneers got the ball back at their own 10-yard line with 2:20 left on the clock. Baker Mayfield drove the Bucs into Carolina territory, with completions to Mike Evans and Cade Otton, plus a 26-yard quarterback scramble. With 49 second left at the Carolina 42, Mayfield and Evans had an apparent miscommunication; Mayfield's pass was intercepted by Lathan Ransom, and Carolina held on to win. With their first loss to Carolina since 2022, officially snapping a 5-game win streak against them, the Buccaneers fell to 7–8 on the season and 2–3 against the NFC South.

==== Week 17: at Miami Dolphins ====
Week 17: Tampa Bay Buccaneers at Miami Dolphins – Game summary

Quarter	1	2	3	4	Total
Buccaneers	7	0	3	7	**17**
**Dolphins**	7	10	0	3	**20**

at Hard Rock Stadium, Miami Gardens, Florida

- Date: December 28
- Game time: 1:00 p.m. EST
- Game weather: Sunny, 80 °F (27 °C)
- Game attendance: 66,552
- Referee: Scott Novak
- TV announcers (Fox): Kenny Albert, Jonathan Vilma and Jen Hale
- Recap, Game Book

Game information

**First quarter**

- TB – Chris Godwin 5-yard pass from Baker Mayfield (Chase McLaughlin kick), 5:27. Buccaneers 7–0. **Drive: 14 plays, 68 yards, 7:27.**
- MIA – Theo Wease Jr. 63-yard pass from Quinn Ewers (Riley Patterson kick), 4:29. Tied 7–7. **Drive: 3 plays, 65 yards, 0:58.**

**Second quarter**

- MIA – Riley Patterson 29-yard field goal, 8:18. Dolphins 10–7. **Drive: 10 plays, 76 yards, 5:41.**
- MIA – Greg Dulcich 11-yard pass from Quinn Ewers (Riley Patterson kick), 1:43. Dolphins 17–7. **Drive: 9 plays, 76 yards, 4:14.**

**Third quarter**

- TB – Chase McLaughlin 33-yard field goal, 3:49. Dolphins 17–10. **Drive: 13 plays, 50 yards, 8:06.**

**Fourth quarter**

- MIA – Riley Patterson 31-yard field goal, 14:15. Dolphins 20–10. **Drive: 8 plays, 32 yards, 4:34.**
- TB – Mike Evans 4-yard pass from Baker Mayfield (Chase McLaughlin kick), 0:50. Dolphins 20–17. **Drive: 3 plays, 91 yards, 1:00.**

**Top passers**

- TB – Baker Mayfield – 33/44, 346 yards, 2 TD, 2 INT
- MIA – Quinn Ewers – 14/22, 172 yards, 2 TD

**Top rushers**

- TB – Bucky Irving – 9 rushes, 19 yards
- MIA – De'Von Achane – 18 rushes, 83 yards

**Top receivers**

- TB – Jalen McMillan – 7 receptions, 114 yards
- MIA – Theo Wease Jr. – 1 reception, 63 yards, TD

Tampa Bay faced in-state rival Miami. Baker Mayfield threw two interceptions and lost a fumble as the Buccaneers fell by the score of 20–17. With was their seventh loss in their last eight games, Tampa Bay secured their first losing season since 2022, falling to 7–9 and finishing 1–3 against the AFC East (2–3 against the AFC) and 4–5 on the road. This marked their first loss to the Dolphins since 2009. Despite the loss, Tampa Bay remained in the hunt for the NFC South division title due to Seattle's win over Carolina.

==== Week 18: vs. Carolina Panthers ====
Week 18: Carolina Panthers at Tampa Bay Buccaneers – Game summary

Quarter	1	2	3	4	Total
Panthers	0	7	0	7	**14**
**Buccaneers**	10	3	0	3	**16**

at Raymond James Stadium, Tampa, Florida

- Date: January 3
- Game time: 4:30 p.m. EST
- Game weather: Rain, 69 °F (21 °C)
- Game attendance: 65,082
- Referee: Brad Allen
- TV announcers (ESPN/ABC): Chris Fowler, Dan Orlovsky, Louis Riddick, Katie George, and Peter Schrager
- Recap, Game Book

Game information

**First quarter**

- TB – Cade Otton 18-yard pass from Baker Mayfield (Chase McLaughlin kick), 9:31. Buccaneers 7–0. **Drive: 9 plays, 74 yards, 5:29.**
- TB – Chase McLaughlin 29-yard field goal, 1:57. Buccaneers 10–0. **Drive: 11 plays, 69 yards, 5:27.**

**Second quarter**

- CAR – Tommy Tremble 8-yard pass from Bryce Young (Ryan Fitzgerald kick), 10:50. Buccaneers 10–7. **Drive: 3 plays, 19 yards, 1:28.**
- TB – Chase McLaughlin 36-yard field goal, 0:02. Buccaneers 13–7. **Drive: 7 plays, 40 yards, 1:49.**

**Third quarter**

- No scoring plays

**Fourth quarter**

- TB – Chase McLaughlin 48-yard field goal, 14:12. Buccaneers 16–7. **Drive: 9 plays, 39 yards, 5:18.**
- CAR – Jalen Coker 8-yard pass from Bryce Young (Ryan Fitzgerald kick), 2:25. Buccaneers 16–14. **Drive: 8 plays, 72 yards, 2:45.**

**Top passers**

- CAR – Bryce Young – 24/35, 264 yards, 2 TD, INT
- TB – Baker Mayfield – 16/22, 203 yards, TD, INT

**Top rushers**

- CAR – Rico Dowdle – 7 rushes, 10 yards
- TB – Bucky Irving – 26 rushes, 85 yards

**Top receivers**

- CAR – Tetairoa McMillan – 4 receptions, 83 yards
- TB – Cade Otton – 7 receptions, 94 yards, TD

Tampa Bay hosted division rival Carolina, with the NFC South division title still to be decided. The game was flexed to Saturday at 4:30 p.m. eastern. Tampa Bay needed a win and a loss by the Atlanta Falcons on Sunday (against the Saints) to clinch their fifth consecutive division crown.

With rain, at times heavy, falling in the first half, Tampa Bay took the opening kickoff. Mayfield drove the Buccaneers 74 yards in 9 plays, capping off the drive with an 18-yard touchdown pass to Cade Otton, and an early 7–0 lead. After a Chase McLaughlin field goal, Tampa Bay led 10–0 at the end of the first quarter. Early in the second quarter, Mayfield threw an interception deep in his own territory, which led to a Carolina touchdown. Tampa Bay led 13–7 at halftime.

The rain lighten up in the second half, but the game continued to be a defensive struggle. The Buccaneers led 16–7 with 14:12 left in regulation. Bryce Young then drove the Panthers to the Tampa Bay 20 yard line. On a 1st & 10 inside the red zone, an aborted flea flicker was fumbled when Rico Dowdle slipped on the wet grass. Tampa Bay recovered, and snuffed out the Carolina scoring opportunity. Leading 16–14, Tampa Bay had the ball with 2:23 to go. Mayfield connected to Cade Otton for a key first down, which allowed the Bucs to run to clock down to inside 30 seconds. Riley Dixon's punt pinned the Panthers back at their own 3 yard line with 18 seconds to go. A desperation pass by Young, followed by a series of laterals went nowhere, and the clock ran out.

With the win, the Buccaneers finished 6–6 against the NFC (3–3 against the NFC South), and 4–4 at home. Despite winning, the Falcons’ victory over the Saints the following day eliminated the Buccaneers from playoff contention. The Buccaneers, Panthers, and Falcons all finished the season with 8–9 records, but Carolina clinched the NFC South title based on head-to-head tiebreakers among the three teams. The Panthers went 3–1 in those matchups, compared to 2–2 for the Buccaneers and 1–3 for the Falcons, eliminating both teams. The Buccaneers were eliminated from playoff contention for the first time since 2019 and failed to win the NFC South for the first time since the 2020 season.

Gene Deckerhoff, the longtime radio voice of the Buccaneers for 37 years, announced his retirement following the season. Wide receiver Mike Evans also didn't finish with a 1,000 yard season for the first time in his career.

=== Standings ===
==== Division ====
NFC South
	W	L	T	PCT	DIV	CONF	PF	PA	STK
^{(4)} Carolina Panthers	8	9	0	.471	3–3	6–6	311	380	L2
Tampa Bay Buccaneers	8	9	0	.471	3–3	6–6	380	411	W1
Atlanta Falcons	8	9	0	.471	3–3	7–5	353	401	W4
New Orleans Saints	6	11	0	.353	3–3	4–8	306	383	L1

==== Conference ====
NFC
Seed	Team	Division	W	L	T	PCT	DIV	CONF	SOS	SOV	STK
**Division leaders**
1	Seattle Seahawks	West	14	3	0	.824	4–2	9–3	.498	.471	W7
2 (Note: Chicago finished ahead of Philadelphia based on head-to-head victory.)	Chicago Bears	North	11	6	0	.647	2–4	7–5	.458	.406	L2
3	Philadelphia Eagles	East	11	6	0	.647	3–3	8–4	.476	.455	L1
4 (Note: Carolina finished ahead of Tampa Bay and Atlanta based on head-to-head record (Carolina 3–1 to Tampa Bay 2–2 and Atlanta 1–3).)	Carolina Panthers	South	8	9	0	.471	3–3	6–6	.522	.463	L2
**Wild cards**
5 (Note: LA Rams finished ahead of San Francisco based on common games (LA Rams 9–3 to San Francisco 8–4 against: Arizona, Atlanta, Carolina, Houston, Indianapolis, Jacksonville, New Orleans, Seattle, Tampa Bay and Tennessee).)	Los Angeles Rams	West	12	5	0	.706	4–2	7–5	.526	.485	W1
6	San Francisco 49ers	West	12	5	0	.706	4–2	9–3	.498	.417	L1
7	Green Bay Packers	North	9	7	1	.559	4–2	7–4–1	.483	.431	L4
**Did not qualify for the postseason**
8 (Note: Minnesota finished ahead of Detroit based on head-to-head sweep.)	Minnesota Vikings	North	9	8	0	.529	4–2	7–5	.514	.431	W5
9	Detroit Lions	North	9	8	0	.529	2–4	6–6	.490	.428	W1
10 (Note: Tampa Bay finished ahead of Atlanta based on common games (Tampa Bay 6–6 to Atlanta 5–7 against: Arizona, Buffalo, Carolina, LA Rams, Miami, New England, New Orleans, NY Jets, San Francisco and Seattle).)	Tampa Bay Buccaneers	South	8	9	0	.471	3–3	6–6	.529	.485	W1
11	Atlanta Falcons	South	8	9	0	.471	3–3	7–5	.495	.449	W4
12	Dallas Cowboys	East	7	9	1	.441	4–2	4–7–1	.438	.311	L1
13	New Orleans Saints	South	6	11	0	.353	3–3	4–8	.495	.333	L1
14	Washington Commanders	East	5	12	0	.294	3–3	3–9	.507	.388	W1
15	New York Giants	East	4	13	0	.235	2–4	2–10	.524	.478	W2
16	Arizona Cardinals	West	3	14	0	.176	0–6	3–9	.571	.422	L9
**Tiebreakers** (Note: When breaking ties for three or more teams under the NFL's rules, they are first broken within divisions, then comparing only the highest ranked remaining team from each division.)

== Awards ==
Player	Award(s)
Kameron Johnson	Week 1: NFC Special Teams Player of the Week
Emeka Egbuka	Offensive Rookie of the Month (September)
Baker Mayfield	Week 5: FedEx Air Player of the Week
Jamel Dean	Week 6: NFC Defensive Player of the Week
Anthony Nelson	Week 8: NFC Defensive Player of the Week
Chase McLaughlin	Week 8: NFC Special Teams Player of the Week
Riley Dixon	Week 13: NFC Special Teams Player of the Week
