= Jacob Parrish =

American football player (born 2004)

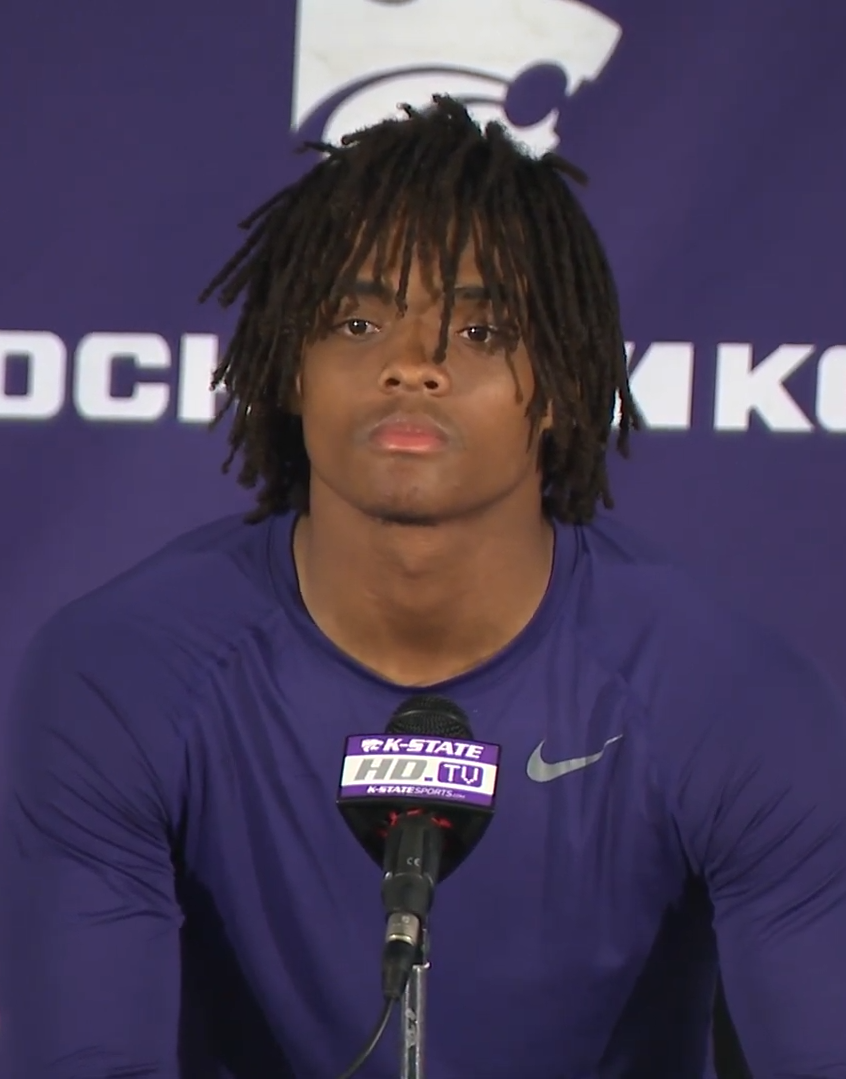

No. 25 – Tampa Bay Buccaneers
- Position: Cornerback
- Roster status: Active

Personal information
- Born: February 29, 2004 (age 22); Jefferson City, Missouri, U.S.
- Listed height: 5 ft 10 in (1.78 m)
- Listed weight: 198 lb (90 kg)

Career information
- High school: Olathe North (Olathe, Kansas)
- College: Kansas State (2022–2024)
- NFL draft: 2025: 3rd round, 84th overall pick

Career history
- Tampa Bay Buccaneers (2025–present)

Awards and highlights
- PFWA All-Rookie Team (2025)

Career NFL statistics as of Week 10, 2026
- Tackles: 115
- Sacks: 2.0
- Fumble recoveries: 1
- Pass deflections: 21
- Interceptions: 4
- Stats at Pro Football Reference

Jacob Parrish (born February 29, 2004) is an American professional football cornerback for the Tampa Bay Buccaneers of the National Football League (NFL). He played college football for the Kansas State Wildcats and was selected by the Buccaneers in the third round of the 2025 NFL draft.

== Early life ==
Parrish attended Olathe North High School in Olathe, Kansas, where, as a senior, he notched 55 tackles and six interceptions in football and won the 100-meter and 200-meter state titles in track. He was rated as a two-star recruit and committed to play college football for the Kansas State Wildcats.

== College career ==
As a freshman in 2022, Parrish totaled 14 tackles, three pass deflections, and a fumble recovery. Heading into the 2023 season, he earned a starting spot on the Wildcats defense. In week 10 of the 2023 season, Parrish recorded two interceptions in a 33–30 loss to Texas. He finished the season with 44 tackles, nine pass deflections, and four interceptions, as he was named an honorable mention all-Big 12 Conference selection.

== Professional career ==
Pre-draft measurables
Height	Weight	Arm length	Hand span	Wingspan	40-yard dash	10-yard split	20-yard split	Vertical jump	Broad jump	Bench press
5 ft 9 3/4 in (1.77 m)	191 lb (87 kg)	30 7/8 in (0.78 m)	9 in (0.23 m)	6 ft 3 7/8 in (1.93 m)	4.35 s	1.51 s	2.55 s	37.5 in (0.95 m)	10 ft 9 in (3.28 m)	16 reps
All values from NFL Combine/Pro Day

Parrish was selected with the 84th pick in the third round of the 2025 NFL draft by the Tampa Bay Buccaneers.

== NFL career statistics ==
=== Regular season ===
Year	Team	Games		Tackles					Interceptions						Fumbles				
Year	Team	GP	GS	Cmb	Solo	Ast	Sck	TFL	Int	Yds	Avg	Lng	TD	PD	FF	Fmb	FR	Yds	TD
2025	TB	17	5	76	50	26	2.0	7	2	3	1.5	3	0	7	0	0	1	0	0
Career		17	5	76	50	26	2.0	7	2	3	1.5	3	0	7	0	0	1	0	0
