= Riley Dixon =

American football player (born 1993)

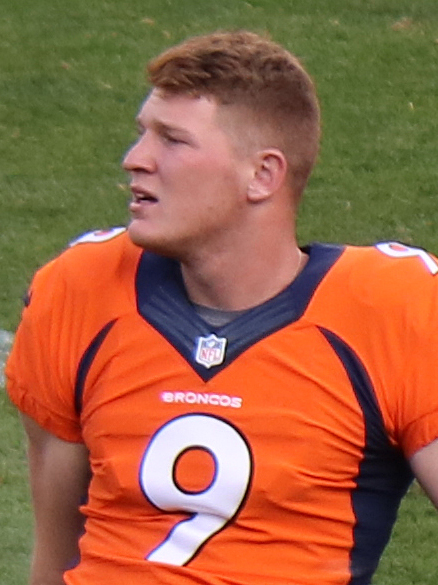
- Dixon with the Denver Broncos in 2016

No. 9 – Tampa Bay Buccaneers
- Position: Punter
- Roster status: Active

Personal information
- Born: August 24, 1993 (age 33); Oneida, New York, U.S.
- Listed height: 6 ft 4 in (1.93 m)
- Listed weight: 221 lb (100 kg)

Career information
- High school: Christian Brothers Academy (DeWitt, New York)
- College: Syracuse (2012–2015)
- NFL draft: 2016: 7th round, 228th overall pick

Career history
- Denver Broncos (2016–2017); New York Giants (2018–2021); Los Angeles Rams (2022); Denver Broncos (2023–2024); Tampa Bay Buccaneers (2025–present)

Awards and highlights
- PFWA All-Rookie Team (2016); First-team All-ACC (2015)

Career NFL statistics as of Week 7, 2026
- Punts: 760
- Punting yards: 34,761
- Punting average: 45.7
- Longest punt: 71
- Inside 20: 266
- Touchbacks: 48
- Stats at Pro Football Reference

Riley T. Dixon (born August 24, 1993) is an American professional football punter for the Tampa Bay Buccaneers of the National Football League (NFL). He was selected by the Broncos in the seventh round of the 2016 NFL draft. He played college football for the Syracuse Orange.

== Early life ==
Dixon attended and played high school football at Christian Brothers Academy in DeWitt, New York.

== College career ==
In 2011, Dixon joined the Syracuse Orange football team as a walk-on. He started for three years and earned All-ACC Second-Team honors in 2015, ranking sixth in SU history with an average of 42.6 yards per punt.

== Professional career ==
Pre-draft measurables
| Height | Weight | Arm length | Hand span | Wingspan |
|---|---|---|---|---|
| 6 ft 4 1/4 in (1.94 m) | 221 lb (100 kg) | 32 1/4 in (0.82 m) | 9 5/8 in (0.24 m) | 6 ft 5 5/8 in (1.97 m) |
All values from NFL Combine

=== Denver Broncos (first stint) ===
Dixon was drafted by the Denver Broncos in the seventh round of the 2016 NFL draft with the 228th overall pick. He was the second of three punters selected in the draft.

On May 11, 2016, the Broncos signed Dixon to a four-year, $2.42 million rookie contract, with a signing bonus of $80,009. Dixon won the punting job on August 30, 2016, when the Broncos released veteran Britton Colquitt. On December 11, 2016, Dixon threw a 16-yard pass on a fake punt, becoming the second Broncos punter to ever throw a pass after Chris Norman in 1986. In his rookie season, he punted 89 times for a 41.3 net average, the highest by a rookie in NFL history. He was named to the 2016 All-Rookie Team, the first Bronco since Chris Harris Jr. & Von Miller were both selected in 2011. In the 2017 season, he had 73 punts for 3,331 net yards for a 45.63 average.

=== New York Giants ===
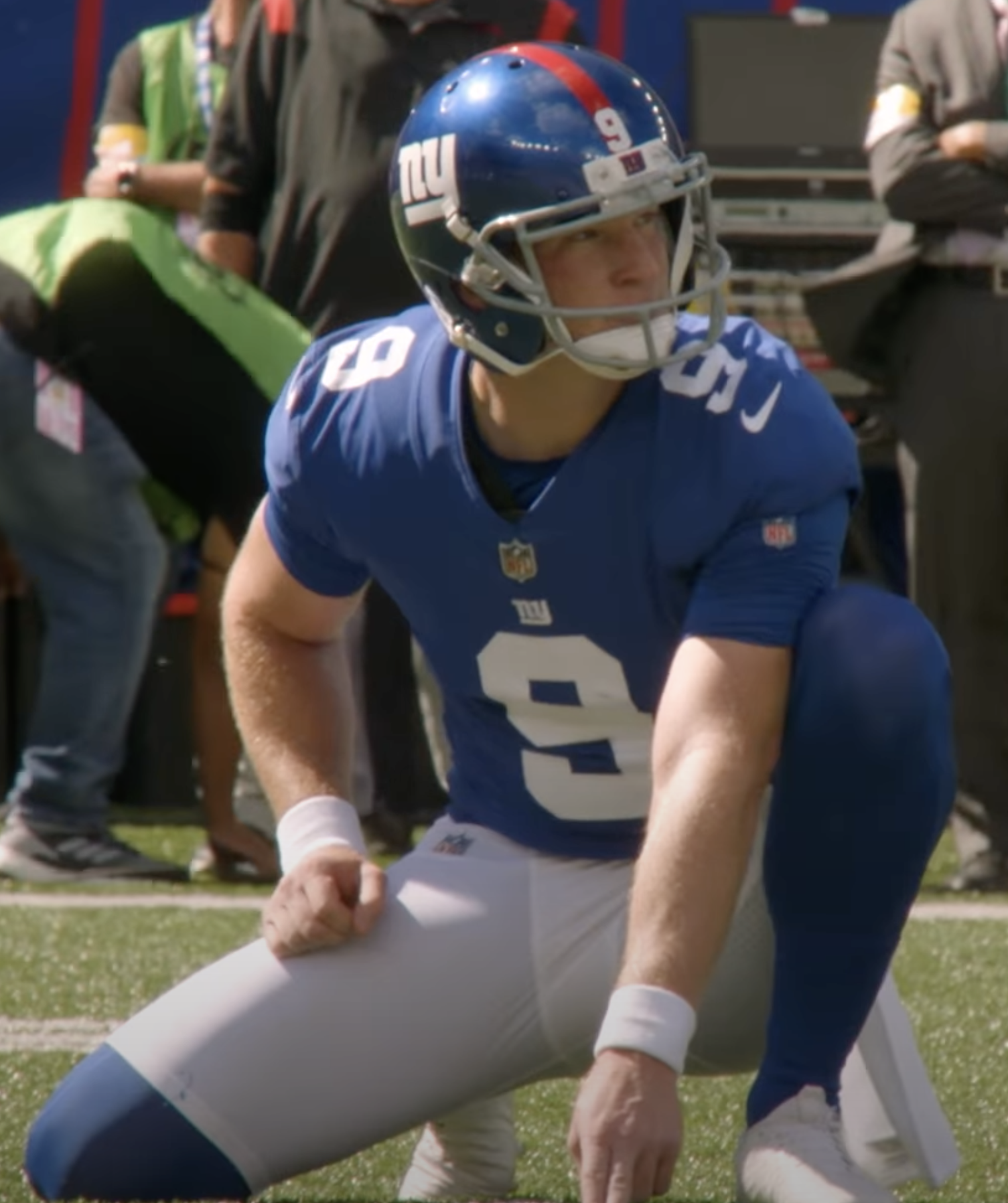
Dixon with the New York Giants in 2021

On April 20, 2018, Dixon was traded to the New York Giants for a 2019 conditional seventh-round draft pick after the Broncos signed former Raiders punter Marquette King. In the 2018 season, he had 71 punts for 3,226 net yards for a 45.44 average.

On December 8, 2019, Dixon signed a three-year contract extension with the Giants. He finished the 2019 season with 69 punts for 3,178 yards for a 46.1 average.

On November 15, 2020, Dixon kicked a 71 yard punt in a game against the Eagles, the longest punt of his career. He was placed on the reserve/COVID-19 list by the Giants on November 18, 2020, and activated on November 23. He finished the 2020 season with 65 punts for 2,911 yards for a 44.8 average.

On December 21, 2021, the Giants restructured Dixon’s contract to create cap space. He finished the 2021 season with 74 punts for 3,283 yards for a 44.4 average.

On March 10, 2022, Dixon was released by the Giants. He finished the 2022 season with 71 punts for 3,434 yards for a 48.4 average.

=== Los Angeles Rams ===
On April 5, 2022, Dixon signed a one-year contract with the Los Angeles Rams.

In Week 16 against the Broncos, the Rams beat Denver 51–14, without ever punting the ball. The Christmas Day contest served as Dixon's first career zero–punt game.

=== Denver Broncos (second stint) ===
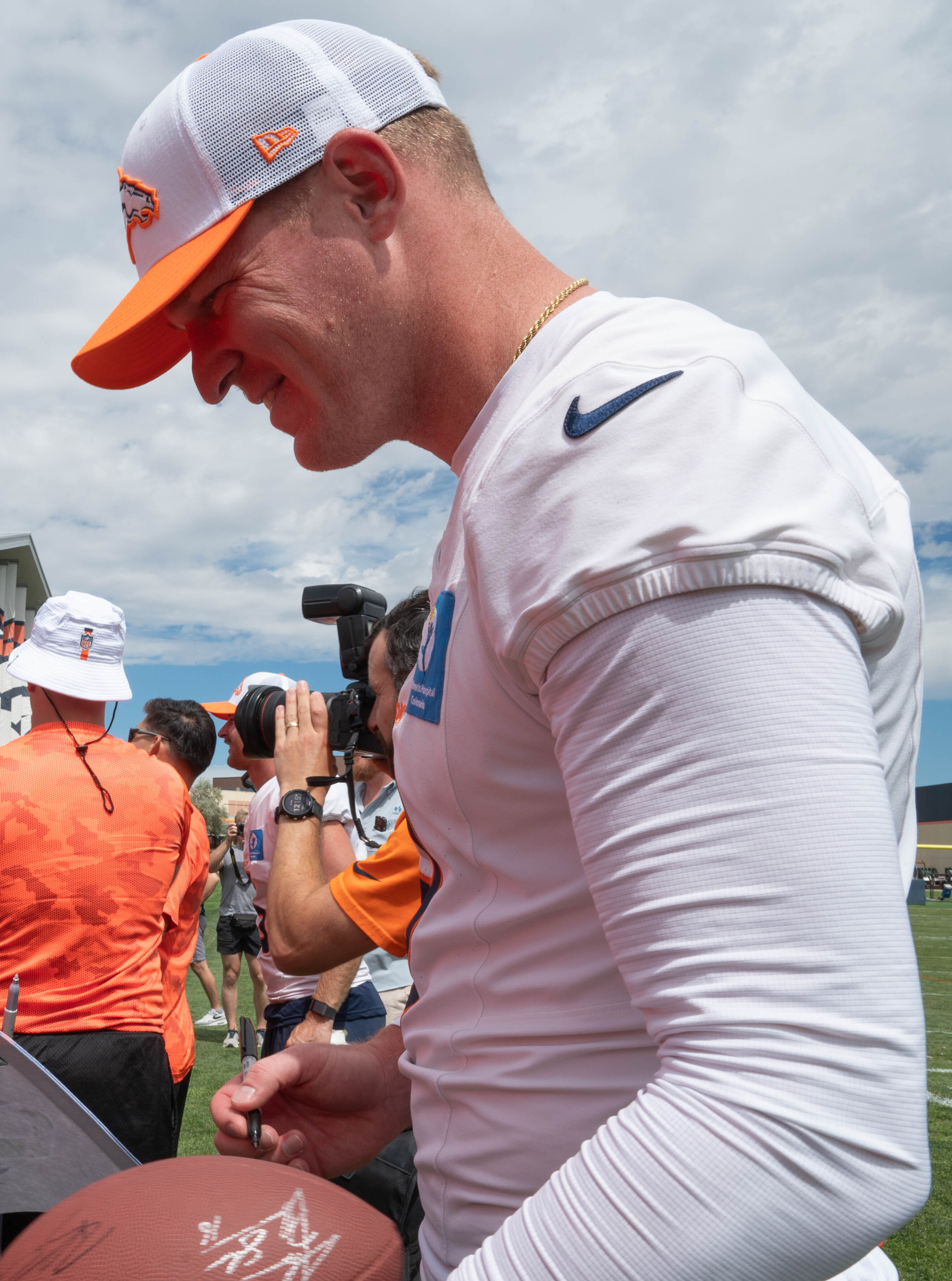
Dixon with the Broncos in 2024

On March 21, 2023, Dixon signed a two-year contract with the Broncos. In the 2023 season, he had 79 punts for 3,659 yards for a 46.3 average. In the 2024 season, he had 77 punts for 3,597 yards for a 46.7 average. During a Wild Card playoff matchup against the Buffalo Bills in 2024, Dixon completed a 17-yard pass to Marvin Mims on a fake punt play.

=== Tampa Bay Buccaneers ===
On March 13, 2025, Dixon signed a two-year, $6 million contract with the Tampa Bay Buccaneers. In Week 13, Dixon punted five times, two landing inside the 10-yard line in a 20-17 win over the Arizona Cardinals, earning NFC Special Teams Player of the Week. He finished the 2025 season with 63 punts for 2,815 yards for a 44.7 average.

== Career statistics ==
=== NFL ===
Legend
| | Led the league |
| **Bold** | Career high |

==== Regular season ====
| Year | Team | GP | Punting | | | | | | | | Passing | | | | | |
| Year | Team | GP | Punts | Yds | Lng | Avg | Net Avg | Blk | Ins20 | RetY | Cmp | Att | Yds | TD | Int | Rtg |
|---|---|---|---|---|---|---|---|---|---|---|---|---|---|---|---|---|
| 2016 | DEN | 16 | **89** | **4,068** | 68 | 45.7 | 41.3 | 0 | 28 | 271 | 1 | 1 | 16 | 0 | 0 | **118.8** |
| 2017 | DEN | 16 | 73 | 3,331 | 60 | 45.6 | 40.2 | **2** | 23 | 258 | — | — | — | — | — | — |
| 2018 | NYG | 16 | 71 | 3,226 | 60 | 45.4 | 41.8 | 0 | 20 | 177 | — | — | — | — | — | — |
| 2019 | NYG | 16 | 69 | 3,178 | 62 | 46.1 | **42.3** | **2** | 29 | 136 | — | — | — | — | — | — |
| 2020 | NYG | 16 | 65 | 2,911 | **71** | 44.8 | 38.8 | 1 | 28 | 232 | 0 | 1 | 0 | 0 | 0 | 39.6 |
| 2021 | NYG | **17** | 74 | 3,283 | 63 | 44.4 | 39.5 | 0 | 24 | 237 | 0 | 1 | 0 | 0 | 0 | 39.6 |
| 2022 | LAR | **17** | 71 | 3,434 | 67 | **48.4** | 40.8 | **2** | 19 | **372** | **2** | **2** | **18** | 0 | 0 | 104.2 |
| 2023 | DEN | **17** | 79 | 3,659 | 68 | 46.3 | 42.2 | 0 | 27 | 202 | — | — | — | — | — | — |
| 2024 | DEN | **17** | 77 | 3,597 | 65 | 46.7 | 42.2 | 0 | **33** | 251 | 1 | 1 | 3 | 0 | 0 | 79.2 |
| 2025 | TB | **17** | 63 | 2,815 | 62 | 44.7 | 38.9 | **2** | 29 | 205 | — | — | — | — | — | — |
| Career | | 165 | 731 | 33,502 | 71 | 45.8 | 40.9 | 9 | 260 | 2,341 | 4 | 6 | 37 | 0 | 0 | 83.3 |

==== Postseason ====
| Year | Team | GP | Punting | | | | | | | | Passing | | | | | |
| Year | Team | GP | Punts | Yds | Lng | Avg | Net Avg | Blk | Ins20 | RetY | Cmp | Att | Yds | TD | Int | Rtg |
|---|---|---|---|---|---|---|---|---|---|---|---|---|---|---|---|---|
| 2024 | DEN | **1** | **4** | **192** | **53** | **48.0** | **40.5** | 0 | **2** | **30** | **1** | **1** | **15** | 0 | 0 | **118.7** |
| Career | | 1 | 4 | 192 | 53 | 48.0 | 40.5 | 0 | 2 | 30 | 1 | 1 | 15 | 0 | 0 | 118.7 |

=== College ===
| Year | School | Conf | Class | Pos | G | Punting | | |
|---|---|---|---|---|---|---|---|---|
| Year | School | Conf | Class | Pos | G | **Punts** | **Yds** | **Avg** |
| 2012 | Syracuse | Big East | SO | K | 2 | 3 | 109 | 36.3 |
| 2013 | Syracuse | ACC | SO | K | 13 | 75 | 3,161 | 42.1 |
| 2014 | Syracuse | ACC | SR | K | 12 | 75 | 3,182 | 42.4 |
| 2015 | Syracuse | ACC | SR | P | 12 | 65 | 2,839 | 43.7 |
| **Career** | **Syracuse** | | | | **39** | **218** | **9,291** | **42.6** |
