= Jim Fyffe =

American sportscaster (1945–2003)

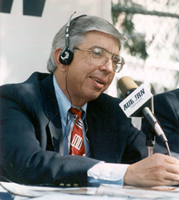
- Born: James William Fyffe; November 20, 1945; Kentucky, U.S.
- Died: May 15, 2003 (aged 57); Montgomery, Alabama, U.S.
- Resting place: Greenwood Cemetery, Montgomery, Alabama
- Occupation: Sportscaster
- Years active: 1981–2003
- Known for: Play-by-play announcer for Auburn Tigers football and basketball
- Spouse: Rose Fyffe

James William Fyffe (November 20, 1945 – May 15, 2003) was an American sportscaster and radio talk-show host. He was best known as the play-by-play announcer for Auburn Tigers football and basketball.

== Career ==
A native of Paintsville, Kentucky, Fyffe became Auburn's play-by-play announcer in 1981 and spent 22 seasons calling Auburn football games. His signature "TOUCHDOWN AUBURN" call was beloved by Auburn fans. During his tenure as the voice of the Auburn Tigers, Fyffe shared the Auburn broadcast booth with three former Auburn quarterbacks. Pat Sullivan, the 1971 Heisman Trophy winner was the color commentator from 1981 to 1985. When Sullivan joined the Auburn coaching staff in 1986, he was replaced by Charlie Trotman, the Tigers quarterback from 1977 to 1979. When Trotman stepped down after the 2000 season, Stan White (the Tigers quarterback from 1990 to 1993) replaced him and worked with Fyffe during his final two seasons in the broadcast booth.

Fyffe also called Auburn basketball for 22 years. During basketball games, Fyffe was known to say "hello" to an Auburn player's home town following a slam dunk. According to Fyffe, this tradition started after Charles Barkley asked him to say hello to all the people in Leeds, Alabama, Barkley's hometown. Fyffe told Barkley that he would have to dunk the ball for him to do that. Barkley did, and thus began a tradition that Fyffe continued throughout his years behind the Auburn microphone. Fyffe also hosted "Tiger Talk", the Auburn Network's weekly radio call-in show until 1998, when Rod Bramblett succeeded him.

Fyffe would end every broadcast by saying, "My time's up, I thank you for yours." He would occasionally alter the phrase to be, "Our time's up, we thank you for yours."

Fyffe was also the play-by-play announcer for the USFL's Birmingham Stallions, Birmingham Steeldogs and Columbus Wardogs of the Arena Football League. He was also the public address announcer for Talladega Superspeedway for 20 years, and was associated with the Blue–Gray Football Classic in Montgomery.

Fyffe was a pioneer in sports-talk radio in Alabama, hosting one of the first such shows in Montgomery in the 1970s. At the time of his death, Fyffe hosted a sports-talk show on WACV in Montgomery, Alabama.

== Death ==
On May 14, 2003, Fyffe attended an Auburn alumni meeting in Prattville, Alabama where he gave a speech opening for Auburn head football coach Tommy Tuberville. Shortly after arriving home, he complained of a headache to his wife, Rose, and eventually collapsed. He was rushed by ambulance to Montgomery's Jackson Hospital where he was diagnosed with a brain aneurysm. Fyffe was removed from life support and pronounced dead at approximately 10:00 AM on May 15, 2003. Following the announcement of his death, many sports talk shows and Alabama TV newscasts played some of his most notable calls, and allowed fans and colleagues of Fyffe to share some of their favorite stories and voice grief over the loss. A public memorial service for Fyffe was held in Montgomery at Leak Memory Chapel, followed by a public funeral at First United Methodist Church. Fyffe is buried at Greenwood Cemetery in Montgomery, Alabama.

Fyffe was survived by his wife Rose, five children, five grandchildren and one great-grandchild.

Rose Fyffe died on June 5, 2011.

== Awards ==
Fyffe was named Alabama Sportscaster of the Year nine times during his career, and received numerous honors from the Auburn University Board of Trustees, the Alabama State Legislature, the Montgomery City Council, and the Auburn Alumni Association.

He was posthumously inducted into the Alabama Sports Hall of Fame in 2005.

== Legacy ==
Rod Bramblett succeeded Fyffe in the Auburn broadcast booth. During each football game broadcast, Bramblett remembered Fyffe by using his signature "Touchdown Auburn" call at least once during the course of a broadcast.

Fyffe suffered from diabetes during his life. Upon his death, the Jim Fyffe Diabetes Research Fund at Auburn University was created in his memory. The fund supports graduate students conducting diabetes research and provides funding for diabetes research projects. The fund was established by Auburn University, the Auburn Network and Fyffe's widow, Rose Fyffe.

== Memorable calls ==
=== 1987: Auburn at Georgia Tech ===
In his autobiography, Fyffe admitted that this call, from the October 17, 1987 game at Georgia Tech was probably the call he was most known for, and he considered it the second greatest Auburn win at the time the book was written (1996). This call is on every collection of memorable radio calls released by the Auburn Network, and it was the call that Paul Finebaum played to open his show on the day of Fyffe's death.

Auburn was heavily favored in the game with Georgia Tech, and this game was to be the last yearly meeting between the two rivals. But with 4:01 to play in the game, Auburn trailed 10-7 and needed to go 91-yards to score. The Tigers moved down the field behind the passing of quarterback Jeff Burger and, 16 plays later, were at the Georgia Tech four-yard-line with only 29 seconds to play:

...they have two tight ends in the game, one setback is Harris, here is motion by Donaldson back to the near side and now reverses his field, goes to the wide side of the field. Burger sets up to throw...OH MY TOUCHDOWN AUBURN! TOUCHDOWN AUBURN! TOUCHDOWN AUBURN! TILLMAN, TILLMAN, TILLMAN...TILLMAN...AT THE BASELINE OF THE END ZONE! A BULLET BY BURGER! AUBURN GOES AHEAD! UNBELIEVABLE! UNBELIEVABLE! TILLMAN FROM BURGER! TOUCHDOWN AUBURN! 13-10 TIGERS LEAD!

The pass from Jeff Burger to receiver Lawyer Tillman completed a 17 play, 91-yard drive and the PAT gave Auburn a 14–10 lead. The Tigers' Aundray Bruce completed the scoring by returning a tipped pass for a touchdown on the last play of the game, and Auburn won 20–10. Fyffe received some criticism from the call...mainly, he said, from Alabama fans. Some in the media criticized him, saying they couldn't tell what was happening. Of the call, Fyffe said, "Frankly, in listening to the replay of the call through the years, I've never thought it was my best. I probably did go too crazy, but I think the listener could tell what was going on without any problem. No matter what I think about it, Auburn fans still come up to me and tell me it was the best call they've ever heard. And that's what matters."

=== 1993: Alabama at Auburn ===
Under new head coach Terry Bowden, Auburn had reached the season ending game with Alabama undefeated at 10–0. The Crimson Tide was 8–1–1 and were the defending National Champions. Normally, a game of this magnitude would've been played before a national television audience. But Auburn was under NCAA sanctions and were not allowed to appear on television during 1993. This was Alabama's second trip to Jordan–Hare Stadium and, due to the magnitude of the game, the two schools set up a closed-circuit television feed to Bryant–Denny Stadium in Tuscaloosa. Fyffe set the scene this way as he opened the broadcast of the game on the Auburn Network:

At a remote outpost in frozen South Korea an army sergeant tunes his radio to the Armed Forces Network to listen as he pulls guard duty along the DMZ. A Selma native living in Fairbanks, Alaska is hosting a listening party today with his friends who'll hear the game via telephone all decked out in orange and blue. A sellout crowd of 85,000 will watch in person, while 44,000 more who scarfed up all the available tickets will view a closed circuit telecast in Tuscaloosa, making this the only game to sell out two stadiums at one time. It impacts the lives of just about everyone who lives here or ever has. If your team wins, seashells and balloons, but losing means a whole year of pure agony. It's the annual meeting between Auburn and Alabama. Hello everybody! War Eagle from Jordan–Hare stadium!

Auburn trailed 14–5 at halftime having mustered only a field goal and a sack of Alabama quarterback Jay Barker for a safety. Midway through the third quarter, the Auburn offense began its best drive of the game, moving from its own 30 yard-line to the Alabama 31. But three plays later, senior quarterback Stan White was knocked out of the game with a knee injury. Rather than punt or attempt a long field goal, Bowden elected to send backup quarterback Patrick Nix into the game with a fourth down play:

...so it's fourth down and 14 to go. Nix this time will go for it with 6:22 left in the third period, Auburn trailing 14-5. Out of the shotgun, Patrick Nix. Alabama bringing everybody. Nix is gonna float one for Sanders, Sanders OH HE CAUGHT IT AT THE TWO! AND HE DIVES IN! TOUCHDOWN AUBURN! TOUCHDOWN AUBURN! OH MY GOODNESS! SANDERS WENT UP OVER TOMMY JOHNSON OR ANTONIO LANGHAM, HE CAUGHT THE BALL AT THE TWO, HOW HE HELD IT I DON'T KNOW, BUT HE DIVED INTO THE ENDZONE, AND AUBURN'S RIGHT BACK IN THE THICK OF IT, WITH A BACKUP QUARTERBACK, TRAILING 14-11! A 35-YARD PASS PLAY, PATRICK NIX TO FRANK SANDERS!

Fyffe's voice was noticeably hoarse during the call and, in his autobiography, Fyffe stated that his voice was noticeably weak at the start of the game, a game he considered one of the biggest of his career due to the magnitude of the game, and the fact the game wasn't on television. He continued, however, and watched as Auburn took the lead on a Scott Etheridge field goal, and, with 2:32 left in the game, Fyffe made his second memorable call as James Bostic sealed the victory:

Two and a half minutes to play, actually 2:32 to go, on a first down play...here up the middle Bostic, five yards, 10 yards, 45 Bostic, 50 Bostic! Racing to the 45 to the 40, breaking a tackle at the 30, to the 20, to the 10, HE'S GONE! TOUCHDOWN, AUBURNNNNNNNNNNN!

The Tigers won 22-14 and finished 11-0 for the first time in the school's history.

=== 1999: Ole Miss at Auburn (Basketball) ===
Though he was most known for his memorable football calls, Fyffe grew up loving college basketball. In his autobiography, Fyffe mentioned the Kentucky announcer Cawood Ledford as one of his favorites.

Fyffe's basketball calls are most likely less memorable due to Auburn's struggles in basketball during most of his career. That was not the case during the 1998–99 season as the Tigers dominated the SEC en route to a #1 seed in the NCAA tournament. On February 10, 1999, Auburn hosted Ole Miss before a sellout crowd at Beard-Eaves Memorial Coliseum and a national television audience on ESPN. Fyffe called the game on the Auburn Network along with color analyst Joe Dean Jr. Auburn started fast and led 18-4 when a missed basket by the Rebels led to an Auburn fast break. The result of the play provides an example of Fyffe's slam dunk call:

Jim Fyffe: ...outlet pass to Robinson. Auburn threatening to break it open, lead pass...AND A BEHIND THE BACK DUNK, OVER THE SHOULDER, BY BRYANT SMITH, OLE MISS WANTS A TIMEOUT...HELLO HUNTSVILLE, ALABAMA! IT'S 20-4, AUBURN, AND THIS PLACE IS GOING WACKO!

Joe Dean, Jr.: That was absolutely UNBELIEVABLE!

Jim Fyffe: All you folks on ESPN, I'll bet you got an eyefull there.

The Tigers would win the game 95–66.

== Books ==
- Fyffe, Jim with Rich Donnell (1996). Touchdown Auburn: Memories and Calls from the Announcer's Booth. Montgomery, Alabama: Donnell Group. ISBN 0-9653313-1-8.
