= Thomas McGaughey =

American football player & coach (born 1973)

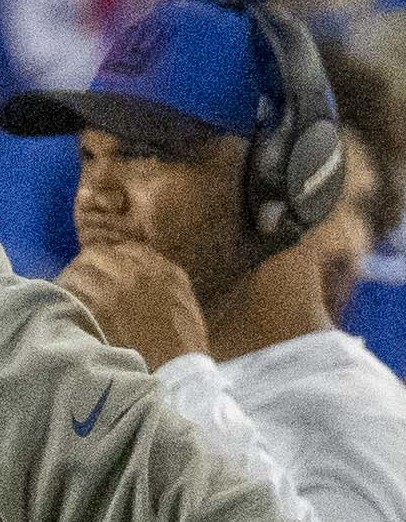
- McGaughey in 2021

Personal information
- Born: May 8, 1973 (age 53); Chicago, Illinois, U.S.

Career information
- Position: Defensive back
- College: Houston
- NFL draft: 1996: undrafted

Career history

Playing
- Texas Terror (1996); Cincinnati Bengals (1996)*; Philadelphia Eagles (1996–1997)*; Barcelona Dragons (1997); Houston ThunderBears (1998)
- * Offseason or practice squad member only

Coaching
- Houston (1998) Graduate assistant; Kansas City Chiefs (2001) Bill Walsh Minority Fellowship; Kansas City Chiefs (2002) Assistant special teams coordinator; Houston (2003-2004); Special teams coordinator (2003); Special teams coordinator & cornerbacks coach (2004); Denver Broncos (2005–2006) Assistant special teams coordinator; New York Giants (2007–2010) Assistant special teams coordinator; LSU (2011–2013) Special teams coordinator & defensive assistant; New York Jets (2014) Special teams coordinator; San Francisco 49ers (2015) Special teams coordinator; Carolina Panthers (2016–2017) Special teams coordinator; New York Giants (2018–2023) Special teams coordinator; Tampa Bay Buccaneers (2024–2025) Special teams coordinator

Awards and highlights
- Super Bowl champion (XLII); NFL Europe’s World Bowl (1997)

Thomas McGaughey (born May 8, 1973) is an American football coach and former player who most recently served as the special teams coordinator for the Tampa Bay Buccaneers of the National Football League (NFL). He has previously served the same role for the Carolina Panthers, San Francisco 49ers, New York Jets and New York Giants. He also served as assistant special teams coordinator for the New York Giants from 2007 to 2010.

== Playing career ==
McGaughey played as a defensive back at the University of Houston from 1991 to 1995. He was the special teams captain as a senior. McGaughey spent time with the Cincinnati Bengals (1996) and Philadelphia Eagles (1997) of the National Football League (NFL). In 1997 he won NFL Europe’s World Bowl with the Barcelona Dragons. In 1999, he played for the Houston Outlaws in the short-lived Regional Football League.

== Coaching career ==
McGaughey started his coaching career with Houston in 1998 as a graduate assistant. In 2002, he became the assistant special teams coach for the Kansas City Chiefs after a year as a minority intern with them, before returning to Houston to be their special teams coordinator. McGaughey then spent the 2005 and 2006 seasons as assistant special teams coordinator for the Denver Broncos, and the same role for the New York Giants from 2007 to 2010. During his first season with the Giants, the team won Super Bowl XLII by defeating the New England Patriots, 17–14.

McGaughey became special teams coordinator for LSU in 2011 and held the position until 2013. He spent the following seasons as special teams coordinator for the New York Jets in 2014, San Francisco 49ers in 2015, and Carolina Panthers from 2016 to 2017.

=== New York Giants (second stint) (2018–2023) ===
On February 11, 2018, McGaughey returned to the New York Giants as special teams coordinator.

In his first season, the Giants' special teams finished 28th in the league. The 2023 season saw the unit decimated by injuries: kicker Graham Gano was placed on injured reserve in November after missing 35% of his field goal attempts for the season, Randy Bullock injured his hamstring on December 17, and Cade York injured his quad in practice before appearing in a game, forcing the team to sign Mason Crosby. McGaughey was fired on January 8, 2024.

=== Tampa Bay Buccaneers (2024–present) ===
On February 7, 2024, McGaughey was hired by the Tampa Bay Buccaneers as their special teams coordinator. On January 8, 2026, McGaughey was fired by Tampa Bay.

== Personal life ==
McGaughey is divorced and he has three children, son Thomas McGaughey III, daughter Taylor, and son Trent.

In May 2020, he was diagnosed with periampullary cancer.
