= Bob Buck (sportscaster) =

American sportscaster and sports director

Robert Buck (May 25, 1938–January 22, 1996) was an American sportscaster and sports director. He was the younger brother of St. Louis Cardinals radio broadcaster Jack Buck and was the uncle of national television sportscaster Joe Buck.

Early in his career, Buck was a sportscaster for NBC Radio. He moved to St. Louis, becoming Sports Director for KMOX/KMOV-TV from 1972 to 1979 and also served as a sports reporter at the station from 1976 to 1982.

From 1985 to 1996, Buck was Sports Director for WIKY AM/FM radio in Evansville, Indiana, where he also provided play-by-play coverage of University of Evansville basketball, football, soccer, and baseball.

Bob Buck had one daughter (Colleen) and three grandchildren (Robert, Jerry, and Natalie).
