= John Moynihan =

American sports broadcaster

John Moynihan was an American sports broadcaster who worked in Boston, Phoenix, and Miami.

== Early career ==
From 1968 to 1973, Moynihan was the play by play announcer for the Vermont Catamounts men's ice hockey team. He then spent one season as the play by play announcer for the New England Whalers of the World Hockey Association.

== Phoenix ==
In 1976, Moynihan moved to Arizona, where he began a twelve-year stint as a sports talk show host as KOY in Phoenix. Moynihan's show was the highest rated sports talk show in Phoenix for many years, however by the late 1980s he had been surpassed by Lee Hamilton. In addition to hosting a talk show, Moynihan also served as the play-by-play voice of the Phoenix Giants and Arizona State Sun Devils football. From 1983 to 1985, he was the color commentator for the United States Football League's Arizona Outlaws.

== Miami ==
In 1988, Moynihan was hired by WQAM to host Sportsline, the station's new 6 to 10 pm sports talk show. While hosting Sportsline, Moynihan had a long-running feud with Hank Goldberg while Goldberg hosted a show during the same time slot for rival station WIOD. By 1991, the feud had escalated to the point where the two threw verbal jabs at each other almost every night. In 1992, Goldberg was fired by WIOD and WQAM hired him to replace Moynihan in the afternoon slot. Moynihan criticized station management on air for this decision, as well as the station's new policy of screening calls, which he believed was to prevent pro-Moynihan, anti-Goldberg calls. Moynihan was moved to the 10 a.m. to 1 p.m. following Goldberg's arrival. In 1993, Moynihan became the radio color commentator and pre- and post-game show host for the expansion Florida Panthers of the National Hockey League. His talk show was moved to 10 p.m. to 1 a.m. to accommodate his Panthers duties. In June 1994, WQAM's vice president and general manager announced that Moynihan would not have his contract renewed.

In 1995, Moynihan returned to the Miami airwaves as the host of a 7 to 9 p.m. general talk program on WAXY. The show ended on March 1, 1996. Moynihan died on December 8, 2002, in Ft. Lauderdale, Florida.
