= Rod Bramblett =

American sportscaster (1965–2019)

- Born: Roderick Jon Bramblett Jr. November 5, 1965; Valley, Alabama, U.S.
- Died: May 25, 2019 (aged 53); Birmingham, Alabama, U.S.
- Education: Auburn University
- Occupation: Sports commentator
- Years active: 1989–2019
- Known for: Play-by-play announcer & Voice of the Auburn Tigers for Auburn Tigers football, basketball and baseball
- Children: 2

Roderick Jon Bramblett Jr. (November 5, 1965 – May 25, 2019) was an American sportscaster who served as radio play-by-play announcer for Auburn Tigers football, basketball, and baseball. He received national media attention during the 2013 football season for his calls of the game-winning plays against the Georgia Bulldogs and the Alabama Crimson Tide.

== Career ==
A 1988 graduate of Auburn University, Bramblett was the lead announcer for Auburn baseball for 11 seasons before he was chosen to succeed the late Jim Fyffe as lead announcer for Auburn football and men's basketball on June 23, 2003. Fyffe had died of a brain aneurysm on May 15, 2003.

Jim Fyffe was known for his enthusiastic "Touchdown Auburn" call and Bramblett initially chose to honor that legacy by using "Touchdown Auburn" in a similar style at least once during football games. He would opt for "Touchdown Tigers" or other phrasing during other times. But in a 2013 interview with AuburnTigers.com writer Charles Goldberg, Bramblett reflected on how he transitioned into using "Touchdown Auburn" exclusively:

"The initial controversy was what was I going to say after a touchdown," Bramblett remembers. "I still have the manila folder at home, and it's a couple of inches think of emails from fans... 'Hey, Rod, here's what I think you should do.' About half were you've got to do your own thing because 'Touchdown Auburn' was Jim's call. The other half said you've got to say it because it's Auburn. When it came to the first game, I just had to convince myself 'you've just got to be yourself.' But even then I didn't know what I'd say. "In the end, Jim's great legacy was 'Touchdown Auburn' and, after two or three years of me sometimes saying it and sometimes not saying it, it just kind of dawned on me that's what needs to be said. Auburn fans expect it. Jim left that as Auburn's signature call. Now, that's what I say every time because Jim made it an Auburn thing more than a Jim thing."

Former Auburn quarterback Stan White served as Bramblett's color commentator throughout his tenure. White has been the network's color commentator since the 2001 football season.

Bramblett also served as the Auburn Network's Director of Broadcast Services, the host of the network's call-in show, Tiger Talk, and the host of the weekly Auburn Football Review TV show.

== Awards ==
Bramblett was named Alabama Sportscaster of the Year three times (2006, 2010, and 2013).

Bramblett was honored as Sports Illustrated's Play-by-Play Announcer of the Year in 2013, primarily based on his calls of the winning plays in Auburn's final, regular season games against Georgia and Alabama.

== Memorable calls ==
=== 2003: Alabama at Auburn ===
Prior to the 2013 season, this call was, perhaps, Rod Bramblett's signature call. The 2003 season had been disappointing for Auburn and the game was played under speculation that head coach Tommy Tuberville would be fired regardless of the outcome. Running back Carnell "Cadillac" Williams had said in previous interviews that he "was crazy" when he was in the zone, and Auburn players had said they "go crazy" when Carnell does. Williams had left his first game against the Crimson Tide in 2001 after suffering a shoulder injury during the first series, and suffered a season-ending leg injury against Florida in 2002. His return to action against the Crimson Tide was highly anticipated. On the first play from scrimmage, Williams took the handoff from quarterback Jason Campbell. In the Auburn radio booth, Rod Bramblett made the call:

"Carnell Williams at the tailback, they'll hand it off to Williams up the middle. Twenty-five, cuts it inside, 30...35, 40. There goes 'Cadillac'! To the 50, to the 40, to the 30, to the 20! To the 15, 10, go crazy 'Cadillac'!!! Go, crazzzyyy!!! Touchdownnnnnn, Auburn!! Eighty yards!!

The Tigers defeated the Crimson Tide 28-23.

=== 2013: Georgia at Auburn ===
Auburn was in the midst of an improbable turnaround under first-year head coach Gus Malzahn after going 3-9 in 2012 (0-8 in SEC play). The Tigers entered their game against the No. 25 Georgia Bulldogs with a 9-1 record and a No. 7 ranking in the AP poll. The Tigers dominated the first half, leading 27-10 at halftime, and 37-17 with 12:39 to play in the fourth quarter. But Georgia quarterback Aaron Murray led a fourth quarter comeback and the Bulldogs took a 38-37 lead when Murray scored on a 5-yard run with 1:49 to play. The Tigers started their ensuing possession on their own 22. After managing one first down, Georgia's Jordan Jenkins sacked quarterback Nick Marshall, setting up a 4th-and-18 play for the Tigers, from their own 27 yard line. Rod Bramblett made the following call:

"Alright, here we go, 4th and 18 for the Tigers. Here's your ballgame. Nick Marshall...stands in, steps up. Gonna throw down field just a home run ball and, uh, it is tipped up...AND LOUIS CAUGHT IT ON THE DEFLECTION!!! LOUIS IS GONNA SCORE!!! LOUIS IS GONNA SCORE!!! LOUIS IS GONNA SCORE!!! TOUCHDOWN AUBURN!!! TOUCHDOWN AUBURN!!! A MIRACLE IN JORDAN-HARE!!! A MIRACLE IN JORDAN-HARE!!! SEVENTY-THREE YARDS!!! AND THE TIGERS, WITH 25 SECONDS TO GO, LEAD 43 TO 38!!!"

Ricardo Louis's catch gave the Tigers a 43-38 advantage (a two-point conversion failed), but Georgia would get one final possession as Aaron Murray led the Bulldogs into Auburn territory. But a Dee Ford sack on fourth down sealed the victory for the Tigers.

The Ricardo Louis touchdown was named the play of the game by CBS Sports and Rod Bramblett's call was used for the video replay. It was later heard on ESPN on both SportsCenter and College Football Final. During the week of the Iron Bowl, ESPN's Tom Rinaldi interviewed Rod Bramblett and others for a feature, titled "Prayer at Jordan-Hare", to be used for ESPN College GameDay, which would be in Auburn for the Iron Bowl. Bramblett called it "the most incredible, phenomenal, improbable, maybe impossible moment that I've ever witnessed and had the opportunity to call."

=== 2013: Alabama at Auburn ===
Two weeks after the miracle win against Georgia, the Tigers faced in-state rival and No. 1 ranked Alabama. ESPN's College GameDay was in town, and the two teams, for the first time since the inception of division play in 1992, would be playing to represent the SEC West in the SEC Championship Game.

The Tigers took an early 7-0 lead on a Nick Marshall touchdown run, but the Crimson Tide pulled out to a 21-7 lead early in the second quarter. The Tigers closed the gap with a Tre Mason touchdown run and were down 21-14 at the half. The Tigers tied the game in the third quarter with a Nick Marshall touchdown pass to C. J. Uzomah. But after pinning the Crimson Tide on their own 1-yard-line, Alabama quarterback A. J. McCarron completed a 99-yard touchdown pass to Amari Cooper to give the Crimson tide a 28-21 lead. The two teams traded defensive stops late in the fourth quarter and Auburn had the ball with 2:32 to play at their own 35. The Tigers ran the ball six consecutive plays and had 1st-and-10 at the Alabama 39 with 0:44 to play. Marshall kept the ball running left, then found receiver Sammie Coates wide open for the game-tying touchdown.

Alabama's ensuing possession started at their 29. After an incomplete pass, T. J. Yeldon ran twice for 9 yards and 26 yards to the Auburn 38. Yeldon appeared to have been pushed out-of-bounds as time expired. But after an official review, it was determined that 0:01 remained in regulation and Alabama sent freshman kicker Adam Griffith in to attempt a 56-yard field goal. After a time-out, Auburn sent defensive back and kick return Chris Davis into the end zone in anticipation of a short kick. On the Auburn IMG Sports Network, Rod Bramblett and Stan White called the play that would become known as the Kick Six:

Rod Bramblett: Chris Davis is gonna drop back into the endzone in single safety...Well I guess if this thing comes up short he can field it, and run it out. Alright, here we go...56-yarder, it's got...no, does not have the leg. And Chris Davis takes it in the back of the end zone. He'll run it out to the 10...15...20...25, 30...35, 40...45, 50...45, there goes Davis!

Stan White (over Bramblett): "Oh my gosh! Oh my gosh!"

Rod Bramblett: DAVIS IS GONNA RUN IT ALL THE WAY BACK!! AUBURN'S GONNA WIN THE FOOTBALL GAME!!! AUBURN'S GONNA WIN THE FOOTBALL GAME!!! He ran the missed field goal back!!! He ran it back a hundred and nine yards!!! They're not gonna keep 'em off the field tonight!!! Holy cow!!! Oh my God!!!...Auburn wins!!! Auburn has won the Iron Bowl!!! Auburn has won the Iron Bowl, in the most unbelievable fashion you will ever see!!! I cannot believe it!!! (Stan White "Oh my God!") 34-28! And we thought 'A Miracle in Jordan-Hare' was amazing! Oh my Lord in heaven!!! Chris Davis... just ran it... one hundred... and nine yards... and Auburn... is going... to the championship game!!!

Stan White: Oh! You got plans next week my friend?! 'Cause I'm gonna be in Atlanta! I'm gonna be in Atlanta!

Rod Bramblett: Oh! Oh my gosh!

Stan White: Oh...my goodness!

Rod Bramblett: Never, in all my days, have I seen anything like THAT!

Stan White: Do you say...this is the most epic Iron Bowl in history?! Oh my goodness, they're storming the field! They can't let 'em off! They can't be denied!

Rod Bramblett: Hats off to the replay booth, because without that...

Stan White: Exactly!

Rod Bramblett: ...overturn, Chris Davis would never have had that opportunity. And as hard as they're gonna try, they're not keeping this bunch of Auburn fans off this field tonight!

Stan White: Wow! I can't believe it! A hundred yards! One hundred yards! Can you believe it?! I still can't believe it!...Oh my goodness! My friend, do you have plans for next weekend?

Rod Bramblett: I tell ya' what...ha, ha, ha...last one out, turn the lights off, lock the gates, and we'll see you in Atlanta!

Stan White: Hey, I know some folks I'd like to join at Toomer's Corner, what do ya' think? You think there'll be anybody over there tonight?! 'Cause we're gonna celebrate my friend!

Rod Bramblett: Until the wee hours of the morning! WAR EAGLE EVERBODY!!! Thirty-four, twenty-eight! The Tigers are SEC Western Division Champions, and Chris Davis is the hero, unlikely as it may be! Tigers win, 34-28!

Chris Davis's return was the CBS play of the game which, once again, allowed the TV audience to hear Bramblett's call. It was also played numerous times on various ESPN programming. Bramblett's call was also featured on ABC News on the Sunday following the game.

On the Monday following the game, Bramblett was interviewed on Fox & Friends and the Tim Brando Show. Richard Sandomir of The New York Times wrote, "Auburn Announcer Has the Call of a Lifetime, Twice in One Month" in a feature story on Bramblett.

Bramblett's Iron Bowl call has itself become part of Auburn folklore. Just days after the game, a video of a 25-year-old woman from North Carolina with no previous connection to Auburn lip synching to Bramblett's call went viral on YouTube. Other similar videos, mostly of young Auburn fans syncing the call, followed.

A week later, the Tigers defeated Missouri 59-42 in the 2013 SEC Championship Game. The win, and Michigan State's win over Ohio State, sent the Tigers to the 2014 BCS National Championship Game vs. Florida State.

== Death ==
On May 25, 2019, Bramblett and his wife Paula were involved in a car accident in Auburn, Alabama; their Toyota Highlander was struck by a Jeep on Shug Jordan Parkway. Bramblett was airlifted to UAB Hospital, where he later died of head injuries. His wife was pronounced dead in the emergency room at East Alabama Medical Center from multiple internal injuries. The 16-year-old driver of the Jeep was under the influence of marijuana and was going 89 miles per hour in a 55-mph zone, and was charged with manslaughter.
