= Stan White (quarterback) =

American football player (born 1971)

Profile
- Position: Quarterback

Personal information
- Born: August 14, 1971 (age 55); Birmingham, Alabama, U.S.

Career information
- High school: W. A. Berry (Hoover, Alabama)
- College: Auburn
- NFL draft: 1994: undrafted

Career history
- Atlanta Falcons (1994)*; New York Giants (1994–1997); → London Monarchs (1997); Miami Dolphins (1998)*; Tampa Bay Buccaneers (1998)*
- * Offseason or practice squad member only

Awards and highlights
- Auburn all-time #1 passer (8,016 yards); 1990 Peach Bowl MVP; 1994 Senior Bowl MVP

Stan White (born August 14, 1971) is an American former football player. He played college football for the Auburn Tigers.

== Football career ==
=== High school and college ===
A graduate of W. A. Berry High School in Hoover, Alabama. He went on to play quarterback at Auburn University where he started every game from his freshman year until his senior year, a total of 45 straight games. He was named permanent team captain on Auburn's undefeated 1993 team that went 11–0 and was also named to Auburn's Team of the Decade for the 1990s.

=== NFL ===
White was signed by the New York Giants as a free agent in 1994 and remained with the team until 1997.

=== WLAF ===
In 1997, he was allocated by the Giants to the London Monarchs of the World League of American Football (WLAF).

== Retirement ==
White returned home to Birmingham in 1998 and then owned a State Farm Insurance and Financial Services Agency in Birmingham, and is currently a diamond dealer in New York.

In 2001 White became the radio color commentator for the Auburn Network's football broadcasts. During the Kick Six in 2013, White was heard screaming, “Oh my gosh!”, while Rod Bramblett made his iconic call of Auburn’s game-winning touchdown vs. Alabama. Stan White retired from being the color man for the Auburn radio football broadcast on 11/30/22. White also makes appearances around the South as a public speaker, along with Jay Barker.

On August 30, 2011, White became co-host of a daily morning drive time sports call in show with Alabama broadcaster Eli Gold on WZNN in Birmingham, Alabama.
