= Gene Deckerhoff =

American sports play-by-play announcer

Emerson Eugene Deckerhoff
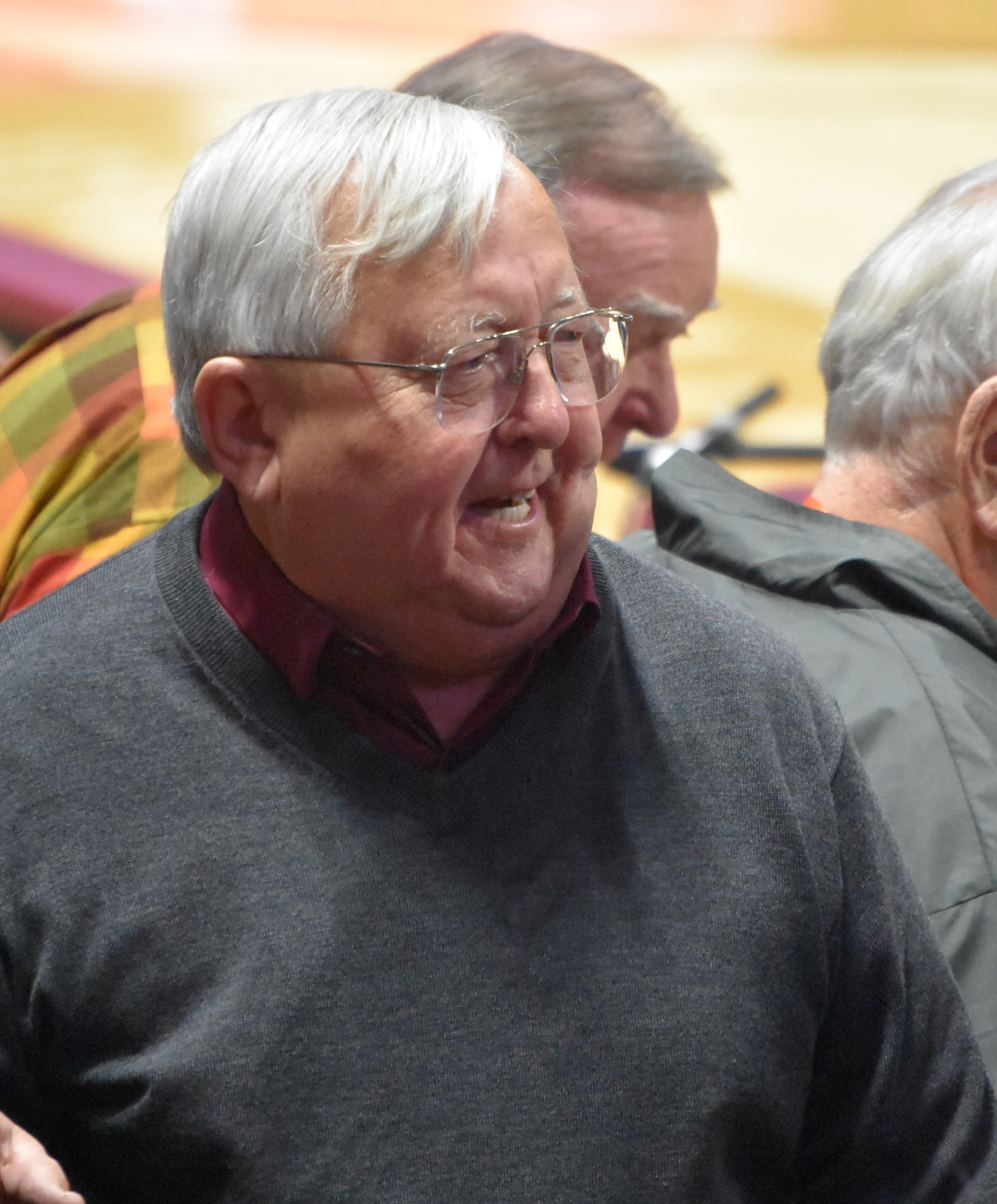
- Deckerhoff in 2020
- Born: May 2, 1945 (age 81); Jacksonville, Florida, U.S.
- Education: University of Florida (bachelor's degree in international relations)
- Known for: Voice of the Tampa Bay Buccaneers; Voice of the Florida State Seminoles
- Spouse: Ann Deckerhoff
- Children: 3 children, 6 grandchildren

Emerson Eugene Deckerhoff Jr. (born May 2, 1945) is a retired sports commentator. He was most recently play-by-play announcer of the NFL's Tampa Bay Buccaneers, a post he held from 1989 to his retirement in 2025. He also served as the longtime voice of the Florida State Seminoles, calling games for the football, men's basketball, and baseball teams. Deckerhoff announced his retirement from FSU broadcasts following the football team's 2022 spring game.

He also has broadcast games for the Arena Football League's Orlando Predators and Tampa Bay Storm as a television play-by-play announcer. He also voices the P.A. announcer for EA Sports Madden NFL, NCAA Football and Arena Football video games.

After the 2025 season, Deckerhoff retired from announcing.

== Broadcasting career ==
Deckerhoff formerly hosted a 30-minute weekly TV show with former FSU head coach Bobby Bowden called "The Bobby Bowden Show" in which they reviewed the previous day's game. The show regularly featured a segment with Burt Reynolds, an FSU alum who played for the Seminole football team in the 1950s.

Gene covered both the Bucs and 'Noles concurrently from 1989 to 2022. He and his wife traveled from Tallahassee to Tampa during football season when Gene's teams were both playing home games.

Deckerhoff is known for bellowing "Touchdown, Tampa Bay!" after every Buccaneer touchdown. During home games, he also adds, "Fire the cannons!"–a nod to the cannons that fire after every touchdown at Raymond James Stadium.

In 2000, he was inducted into the Florida Sports Hall of Fame, and in 2002 was inducted into the Florida State University Athletics Hall of Fame. He graduated from the University of Florida, but was quoted as saying "I'm not a Gator - Period."
