= 1984 Oklahoma Outlaws season =

American football team season

- Owner: William R. Tatham Sr.
- Head coach: Woody Widenhofer
- Home stadium: Skelly Stadium

Results
- Record: 6–12
- Division place: 4th Central Division
- Playoffs: No playoffs

The 1984 Oklahoma Outlaws season was the inaugural season for the Oklahoma Outlaws in the United States Football League. The team was located in Tulsa, Oklahoma and played at Skelly Stadium. Under head coach Woody Widenhofer, the team finished with a 6-12 record. Following the season, the team would merge with the Arizona Wranglers and relocate to Arizona.

== Personnel ==
=== Staff/coaches ===
1984 Oklahoma Outlaws staff
Front office: Owner – William R. Tatham Sr.; Head coaches: Head coach – Woody Widenhofer; Offensive coaches: Offensive coordinator/Quarterbacks – Ed Chlebek; Receivers – Wright Anderson; Running backs – Frank Novak; Offensive line – Charlie Butler	Defensive coaches: Defensive coordinator/sedondary – Jim Johnson; Defensive line – Ralph Staub; Linebackers – Jim McKinley; Special teams coaches: Special teams – Wright Anderson

== Roster ==
1984 Oklahoma Outlaws roster
Quarterbacks (QB): 15 Rick Johnson; 10 Mike Loyd; 12 Doug Williams; Running backs (RB): 42 Derek Hughes FB; 31 Darryl James RB; 43 George Ragsdale RB/KR; 26 Ted Sample RB; 38 Sidney Thornton FB; 35 Mel Tucker FB; Wide receivers (WR): 80 James Bennett; 86 Ken Blair; 80 Darryl Crane; 85 Mel Gray; 82 Lonnie Harris; 81 Otha Hill; 87 Dewey McClain; 87 Jack Steptoe; 83 Lonnie Turner; 41 Alphonso Williams; Tight ends (TE): 88 Ron Wheeler	Offensive linemen (OL): 64 Jay Bequette C; 57 Frank Frazier LG; 70 Reggie Irving RG; 50 Mike Katolin C/LS; 77 Jim Bob Lamb RT; 75 Joe Levelis T/G; 63 Alvin Powell RG; 69 Steve Pytel LT; 66 Carl Roberts LG; 72 Bob Speight T; 76 James Taylor LT; 73 Duane Wilson RT; Defensive linemen (DL): 90 Curtis Anderson RDE; 92 Steve Ballard RDE; 94 Phil Bruneau DE; 67 Jeff Jackson LDE; 60 Johnny Lewis NT; 72 Ken McCune DE; 65 Bob Nelson NT; 91 Mitchell Pounds DE; 71 Clay Ruyle DE; 62 Tony Suber DE	Linebackers (LB): 58 Terry Beeson LILB; 46 Darryl Goodlow ROLB; 56 Tony Hayes RILB; 53 Vic Koenning LB; 52 Dewey McClain LOLB; 68 John Mitchell LB; 51 Sam Prater LB; 54 Isaiah West ROLB; Defensive backs (DB): 45 Vance Bedford CB; 25 Bonji Bonner SS; 40 Barry Copeland RCB; 20 John Higgins RCB; 28 Tom Knight CB; 24 Rodney McMillan LCB; 21 Kelvin Middleton FS; 23 Kevin Robinson CB/FS; 22 Lee Wilson LCB; 44 Herb Williams SS; Special teams (ST): 8 Bob Boris P; 6 Stu Crum K; 3 Case deBruijn P; 1 Efrén Herrera K	Rookies in italics

== Preseason ==
Week	Date	Opponent	Result	Record	Venue	Attendance
1	Bye					
2	Bye					
3	February 11	Tampa Bay Bandits	L 6–15	0–1	Tampa Stadium	42,247
4	February 18	vs. Houston Gamblers	L 7–34	0–2	Lewis Field, Stillwater, Oklahoma	6,120

== Regular season ==
Week	Date	Opponent	Result	Record	Venue	Attendance
1	February 26	Pittsburgh Maulers	W 7–3	1–0	Skelly Stadium	15,973
2	March 3	Denver Gold	L 14–17 (OT)	1–1	Skelly Stadium	25,403
3	March 11	San Antonio Gunslingers	W 14–7	2–1	Skelly Stadium	24,311
4	March 17	at Chicago Blitz	W 17–14	3–1	Soldier Field	6,206
5	March 24	at Arizona Wranglers	L 7–49	3–2	Sun Devil Stadium	29,434
6	March 31	Houston Gamblers	W 31–28 (OT)	4–2	Skelly Stadium	17,266
7	April 7	Michigan Panthers	W 20–17	5–2	Skelly Stadium	21,510
8	April 14	at Washington Federals	W 20–16	6–2	RFK Stadium	6,075
9	April 21	at Birmingham Stallions	L 17–41	6–3	Legion Field	41,653
10	April 27	Jacksonville Bulls	L 6–34	6–4	Skelly Stadium	29,324
11	May 6	at New Jersey Generals	L 17–49	6–5	Giants Stadium	34,917
12	May 14	at Tampa Bay Bandits	L 21–48	6–6	Tampa Stadium	45,116
13	May 20	at Houston Gamblers	L 12–31	6–7	Houston Astrodome	31,142
14	May 26	Oakland Invaders	L 14–17	6–8	Skelly Stadium	16,378
15	June 2	Chicago Blitz	L 0–14	6–9	Skelly Stadium	17,195
16	June 10	Los Angeles Express	L 10–17	6–10	Skelly Stadium	22,017
17	June 18	at Michigan Panthers	L 24–34	6–11	Pontiac Silverdome	15,838
18	June 24	at San Antonio Gunslingers	L 0–23	6–12	Alamo Stadium	21,625

== Standings ==
USFL Central Division
	W	L	T	PCT	DIV	PF	PA	STK
Houston Gamblers	13	5	0	.722	5–3	618	400	W7
Michigan Panthers	10	8	0	.556	7–1	400	382	W2
San Antonio Gunslingers	7	11	0	.389	2–6	309	325	W1
Oklahoma Outlaws	6	12	0	.333	4–4	251	459	L10
Chicago Blitz	5	13	0	.278	2–6	340	466	L3
