= Greg Moser =

American football player (born 1960)

No. 81, 85, 84
- Position: Wide receiver

Personal information
- Born: May 5, 1960 (age 66); Fort Collins, Colorado, U.S.
- Listed height: 6 ft 0 in (1.83 m)
- Listed weight: 185 lb (84 kg)

Career information
- High school: Hood River (Hood River, Oregon)
- College: Oregon
- NFL draft: 1983: undrafted

Career history
- Los Angeles Express (1983); Houston Gamblers (1984); Memphis Showboats (1985)

Gregory Andrew Moser (born May 5, 1960) is an American former professional football wide receiver who played in the United States Football League (USFL) with the Los Angeles Express, Houston Gamblers, and Memphis Showboats. He played college football and baseball for the Oregon Ducks.

== Early life ==
Gregory Andrew Moser was born on May 5, 1960, in Fort Collins, Colorado. He attended Hood River Valley High School in Hood River, Oregon.

== College career ==
Moser enrolled at the University of Oregon to play college football for the Ducks. He was a four-year letterman from 1979 to 1982. He played in all 33 games from 1979 to 1981 but only four games in 1982 due to a broken foot. Moser caught three passes for 34 yards in 1979, 32 passes for 611 yards and two touchdowns in 1980, 39 passes for 605 yards and two touchdowns in 1981, and ten passes for 156 yards and one touchdown in 1982. He also threw a 25-yard touchdown in 1981.

Moser played college baseball for the Ducks as well. After the spring 1981 season, the school dropped baseball. However, Moser continued on with the University of Oregon's club baseball team.

== Professional career ==
After going undrafted in the 1983 NFL draft, Moser signed with the Los Angeles Express of the United States Football League (USFL) on May 14, 1983, midway through the 1983 USFL season. He played in seven games for the Express as a reserve wide receiver, recording four receptions for 47 yards, two kick returns for 20 yards, two punt returns for five yards, and one fumble recovery.

On September 6, 1983, Moser was selected by the Houston Gamblers in an expansion draft. He played in all 18 games, starting 17, for the Gamblers during the 1984 season, catching 36 passes for 685 yards and four touchdowns. Houston finished the year with a 13–5 record. He was released on February 7, 1985, a few weeks before the start of the 1985 regular season.

Moser then signed with the Memphis Showboats. He led the team in receiving yards in 1985, totaling 57 catches for 1,145 yards and six touchdowns as Memphis went 11–7. The USFL folded after the 1985 season.
