= Bob Nelson (defensive tackle) =

American football player (born 1959)

No. 65, 71, 79
- Position: Nose tackle

Personal information
- Born: March 3, 1959 (age 67); Baltimore, Maryland, U.S.
- Listed height: 6 ft 4 in (1.93 m)
- Listed weight: 272 lb (123 kg)

Career information
- College: Miami (FL)
- NFL draft: 1982: 5th round, 120th overall pick

Career history
- Miami Dolphins (1982)*; Arizona Wranglers (1983); Oklahoma Outlaws (1984); Jacksonville Bulls (1985); Tampa Bay Buccaneers (1986); Green Bay Packers (1988–1990)
- * Offseason or practice squad member only

Career NFL statistics
- Sacks: 3
- Fumble recoveries: 2
- Stats at Pro Football Reference

Robert William Nelson (born March 3, 1959) is a retired American football nose tackle who played in the National Football League (NFL). He played for the Tampa Bay Buccaneers for one season and the Green Bay Packers for two seasons. Prior to entering the NFL, Nelson had a stint with the Arizona Outlaws of the USFL. Nelson played college football at the University of Miami (Florida).

Nelson gained a bit of fame in the early 1990s through his inclusion in the Nintendo home video game "Tecmo Super Bowl." Nelson was among the most dominant defensive players in the game, even though he played as a nose tackle, a position in which the primary responsibility is to occupy offensive linemen to allow other defensive players to make tackles. Nelson's speed in the game enabled him to make a sack on nearly every play as a human-controlled player. As a result, players of Tecmo Super Bowl frequently agree not to use the play.
