= 1985 Los Angeles Express season =

- Head coach: John Hadl
- Offensive coordinator: Sam Gunnelsen
- Defensive coordinator: Mike Ackerley
- Home stadium: Los Angeles Memorial Coliseum

Results
- Record: 3-15
- Conference place: 7th, Western Conference
- Playoffs: Did not qualify

The 1985 season was the third and final season for the Los Angeles Express in the final year of United States Football League.

== Season summary ==
The Express finished 3–15–0 in the regular season, placing 7th in the Western Conference with a .167 win percentage. They were ownerless for the season after J. William Oldenburg had lost ownership of the team due to financial issues.

The 1985 season was a complete collapse from the Express’ 1984 playoff run, where they reached the Western Conference final. Ownerless, injury-plagued, and with poor attendance, the team struggled to field a competitive roster. Starting quarterback Steve Young, injured for most of the season, later bought out his massive contract to join the NFL.

== Schedule ==
Week	Date	Opponent	Result	Record	Venue	Attendance
1	February 24, 1985	Houston Gamblers	L 33–34	0–1	Los Angeles Memorial Coliseum	18,828
2	March 2	at Portland Breakers	L 10–14	0–2	Civic Stadium	25,232
3	March 11	at New Jersey Generals	L 24–35	0–3	Giants Stadium	58,741
4	March 16	San Antonio Gunslingers	W 38–7	1–3	Los Angeles Memorial Coliseum	10,410
5	March 23	Arizona Outlaws	L 13–27	1–4	Sun Devil Stadium	20,835
6	March 31	Oakland Invaders	L 6-30	1–5	Los Angeles Memorial Coliseum	11,619
7	April 7	at Baltimore Stars	L 6–17	1–6	Los Angeles Memorial Coliseum	5,637
8	April 14	at Houston Gamblers	W 18–17	2–6	Astrodome	20,193
9	April 20	at Denver Gold	L 0–51	2–7	Mile High Stadium	13,165
10	April 27	Portland Breakers	W 17–12	3–7	Los Angeles Memorial Coliseum	8,410
11	May 4	Tampa Bay Bandits	L 14–24	3–8	Los Angeles Memorial Coliseum	4,912
12	May 11	at Oakland Invaders	L 6–27	3–9	Oakland-Alameda County Coliseum	12,482
13	May 19	Birmingham Stallions	L 7-44	3–10	Los Angeles Memorial Coliseum	4,658
14	May 25	at Jacksonville Bulls	L 7-21	3–11	Gator Bowl	51,033
15	May 30	Denver Gold	L 20–27	3–12	Los Angeles Memorial Coliseum	3,059
16	June 9	at San Antonio Gunslingers	L 27–31	3–13	Alamo Stadium	4,963
17	June 15	Arizona Outlaws	L 10–21	3–14	Shephard Stadium	8,200
18	June 18, 1985	Orlando Renegades	L 10–17	3–15	Orlando Stadium	22,865

== Final roster ==
1985 Los Angeles Express final roster
Quarterbacks: 8 Steve Young; 15 Mike Rae; 10 Frank Seurer; Running backs: 3 Kevin Nelson FB; 27 Kevin Mack FB; 25 Mel Gray RB; 24 Tony Boddie RB; 49 Kirby Warren RB; 31 Robert Alexander RB; Wide receivers: 87 LeRoy Campbell; 26 JoJo Townsell; 83 Duane Gunn; 80 Kris Haines; 82 Gary Lowell; 81 David Hersey; Tight ends: 85 Ken O'Neal RB/TE; 86 Mike Sherrod WR/TE; 84 Darren Long	Offensive linemen: 56 Gary Zimmerman T; 63 Joe Lukens LG; 65 Wayne Jones C; 67 Ed Fisher T /G; 70 Derrick Kennard G; 60 Mike Durrette LG; 72 Jeff Hart RG; 67 Michael Wilson G/T; 66 Dan Doubiago G /T; 55 Mike Ruether OL /TE/LB; 62 Greg Loberg OL/C; Defensive linemen: 78 Clay Ruyle LDE; 61 Eddie Weaver RDT; 75 George Achica DT; 90 Fletcher Jenkins DE /DT; 93 Ray Cattage DE; 99 James Robinson LDT; 79 Charles Ussery RDE	Linebackers: 52 Andy Melontree LB; 53 Danny Rich LLB; 55 Gary Moten; 58 David Howard; 59 Ed Martin LB; 54 Howard Carson; 50 Kevin Turner LB; Defensive backs: 22 Wymon Henderson /FS; 43 Dwight Drane DB; 46 Darrell Patillo FS; 23 Ed Scott CB; 47 Troy West FS; 20 John Higgins SS; 27 Don Jones DB; Special teams: 11 Tony Zendejas K; 16 Jeff Partridge P	Developmental squad: None - N/A	Injured reserve: None - N/A; rookies in italics
