= 1984 New Jersey Generals season =

Defunct football team in the USFL

- Owner: Donald Trump
- Head coach: Walt Michaels
- Home stadium: Giants Stadium

Results
- Record: 14–4
- Division place: 2nd Atlantic Division
- Playoffs: Lost Divisional Playoffs (vs. Stars) 7–28

The 1984 season was the second season for the New Jersey Generals in the United States Football League, and first under head coach Walt Michaels. The team finished with a 14-4 record.

== Preseason ==
Week	Date	Opponent	Result	Record	Venue	Attendance
1	Bye					
2	Bye					
3	February 11	vs. Philadelphia Stars	W 28–20	1–0	Deland, Florida	
4	February 17	vs. Washington Federals	W 27–24	2–0	Orlando, Florida	3,784

== Regular season ==
Week	Date	Opponent	Result	Record	Venue	Attendance
1	February 26	at Birmingham Stallions	W 17–6	1–0	Legion Field	62,300
2	March 4	at Jacksonville Bulls	W 28–26	2–0	Gator Bowl Stadium	73,227
3	March 11	Philadelphia Stars	W 17–14	3–0	Giants Stadium	46,716
4	March 18	at Houston Gamblers	L 25–32	3–1	Houston Astrodome	35,532
5	March 25	Washington Federals	W 43–6	4–1	Giants Stadium	38,075
6	March 31	at Los Angeles Express	W 26–10	5–1	Los Angeles Memorial Coliseum	19,853
7	April 8	Memphis Showboats	W 35–10	6–1	Giants Stadium	43,671
8	April 15	Arizona Wranglers	L 3–20	6–2	Giants Stadium	31,917
9	April 22	at Pittsburgh Maulers	W 14–10	7–2	Three Rivers Stadium	14,418
10	April 29	Michigan Panthers	W 31–21	8–2	Giants Stadium	50,908
11	May 6	Oklahoma Outlaws	W 49–17	9–2	Giants Stadium	34,917
12	May 11	at Washington Federals	L 17–31	9–3	RFK Stadium	11,367
13	May 21	Pittsburgh Maulers	W 16–14	10–3	Giants Stadium	41,212
14	May 28	at Chicago Blitz	W 21–17	11–3	Soldier Field	4,307
15	June 3	at Tampa Bay Bandits	L 14–40	11–4	Tampa Stadium	45,255
16	June 10	New Orleans Breakers	W 31–21	12–4	Giants Stadium	23,114
17	June 16	Denver Gold	W 27–7	13–4	Giants Stadium	28,915
18	June 24	at Philadelphia Stars	W 16–10	14–4	Veterans Stadium	37,758

== Playoffs ==
Round	Date	Opponent	Result	Record	Venue	Attendance
Divisional	June 30	at Philadelphia Stars	L 7–28	0–1	Franklin Field	19,038
