= Alva Liles =

American football player (1956–1998)

No. 60, 63, 92
- Position: Defensive lineman

Personal information
- Born: March 6, 1956; Oklahoma City, Oklahoma, U.S.
- Died: January 7, 1998 (aged 41); Sacramento, California, U.S.
- Listed height: 6 ft 3 in (1.91 m)
- Listed weight: 255 lb (116 kg)

Career information
- High school: Sacramento
- College: Boise State (1974–1977)
- NFL draft: 1978: undrafted

Career history
- Washington Redskins (1978)*; Sacramento Buffalos (1978); Oakland Raiders (1979)*; New York Jets (1980)*; Oakland Raiders (1980); Detroit Lions (1980); Tampa Bay Buccaneers (1981)*; Oakland Invaders (1983); Oklahoma Outlaws (1984)*; Arizona Wranglers (1984)
- * Offseason or practice squad member only
- Stats at Pro Football Reference

Alva Edison Liles (March 6, 1956 – January 7, 1998) was an American professional football defensive lineman who played in the National Football League (NFL) with the Detroit Lions and Oakland Raiders. He played college football at Boise State University.

== Early life and college ==
Alva Edison Liles was born on March 6, 1956, in Oklahoma City, Oklahoma. He played football at Sacramento High School in Sacramento, California, graduating in 1974. He played college football at Boise State University, as an offensive guard, and was a four-year letterman from 1974 to 1977.

== Professional career ==
Liles signed with the Washington Redskins after going undrafted in the 1978 NFL draft. He was released on July 25, 1978.

On August 23, 1978, Liles signed with the Sacramento Buffalos of the California Football League. However, he quit the team a few days later after his agent advised him that the Redskins might be interesting in signing him again, and that he should not risk injury by playing for the Buffalos.

Liles was signed by the Oakland Raiders on March 15, 1979. He was later released on August 14, 1979.

He signed with the New York Jets on February 20, 1980. He was released on July 18, 1979, after quitting the team to take care of his sick mother.

Liles then signed with the Raiders in early August 1980. He was placed on injured reserve on August 19, released on September 20, and signed again on October 3. He then played in two games for the Raiders during the 1980 season before being released on October 15, 1980.

Liles signed with the Detroit Lions on November 4, 1980. He appeared in one game for Detroit before being released on November 19, 1980. He re-signed with the Lions in 1981 but was later released on July 16, 1981.

Liles was signed by the Tampa Bay Buccaneers on July 28, 1981, but quickly released on August 4, 1981.

Liles signed with the Oakland Invaders of the United States Football League (USFL) on December 30, 1982. He played in 14 games for the Invaders during the 1983 season and recorded five sacks.

On September 6, 1983, Liles was selected by the Oklahoma Outlaws of the USFL in an expansion draft. On February 27, 1984, it was reported that Liles had been traded to the Arizona Wranglers for past considerations. However, he never played for the Wranglers.

== Personal life ==
Liles died on January 7, 1998, in Sacramento at the age of 41. He had been suffering from non-Hodgkin lymphoma.
