= Wyatt Henderson =

American football player (born 1956)

No. 32
- Position: Defensive back

Personal information
- Born: November 10, 1956 (age 69); Bakersfield, California, U.S.
- Listed height: 5 ft 10 in (1.78 m)
- Listed weight: 180 lb (82 kg)

Career information
- High school: Fairfax (Los Angeles)
- College: Fresno State
- NFL draft: 1979: undrafted

Career history
- Los Angeles Rams (1980)*; San Diego Chargers (1981); Oakland Invaders (1983); Jacksonville Bulls (1984)
- * Offseason or practice squad member only
- Stats at Pro Football Reference

Wyatt Henderson (born November 10, 1956) is an American former professional football player who was a defensive back for the San Diego Chargers of the National Football League (NFL) in 1981. He played college football for the Fresno State Bulldogs. He also played in the United States Football League (USFL) for the Oakland Invaders in 1983 and for the Jacksonville Bulls in 1984.
