= Marcus Quinn =

American gridiron football player (born 1959)

Profile
- Position: Safety

Personal information
- Born: June 27, 1959 (age 67); Tylertown, Mississippi, U.S.
- Listed height: 6 ft 1 in (1.85 m)
- Listed weight: 205 lb (93 kg)

Career information
- High school: St. Augustine (New Orleans, Louisiana)
- College: LSU
- NFL draft: 1981: undrafted

Career history
- Ottawa Rough Riders (1981)*; New Orleans Saints (1982)*; Oakland Invaders (1983–1985); Tampa Bay Bandits (1985); Tampa Bay Buccaneers (1987)
- * Offseason or practice squad member only

Awards and highlights
- USFL Defensive Player of the Year (1984); All-USFL (1984)
- Stats at Pro Football Reference

Marcus Quinn (born June 27, 1959) is an American former professional football player who was a safety in the National Football League (NFL) and United States Football League (USFL). He played college football for the LSU Tigers.

== Early life ==
Quinn was born in Tylertown, Mississippi, and grew up in New Orleans, Louisiana and attended St. Augustine High School. He helped lead the Purple Knights to a 15–0 record as a junior and was named first-team All-State as a senior.

== College career ==
Quinn was a member of the LSU Tigers for four seasons. He played running back as a freshman in 1977 before moving to defensive back. Quinn was a three-year starter at safety in a defensive backfield nicknamed the "Soul Patrol" along with future NFL players Willie Teal, James Britt and Chris Williams. Quinn finished his collegiate career with six interceptions.

== Professional career ==
Quinn was signed by the Ottawa Rough Riders after going unselected in the 1981 NFL Draft but was cut during training camp. He was signed by the New Orleans Saints in 1982 but was waived during final roster cuts. Quinn was signed by the Oakland Invaders of the newly formed United States Football League (USFL) on February 7, 1983. He was named All-USFL and the 1984 USFL Defensive Player of Year after leading the league with 12 interceptions. Quinn began the 1985 in a contract dispute with the Invaders and was traded to the Tampa Bay Bandits in March. Quinn was signed by the Tampa Bay Buccaneers in October 1987 as a replacement player during the 1987 NFL players strike and started three games at strong safety before being released when the strike ended.
