= 1985 New Jersey Generals season =

Defunct football team in the USFL

- Owner: Donald Trump
- Head coach: Walt Michaels
- Home stadium: Giants Stadium

Results
- Record: 11–7
- Division place: 2nd Eastern
- Playoffs: Lost Quarterfinal (vs. Stars) 17–20

The 1985 season was the third and final season for the New Jersey Generals in the United States Football League, and second under head coach Walt Michaels. The team finished with a 11–7 record.

== Preseason ==
Week	Date	Opponent	Result	Record	Venue	Attendance
1	February 2	vs. Memphis Showboats	W 16–3	1–0	Charlotte, North Carolina	11,667
2	February 9	at Tampa Bay Bandits	L 7–21	1–1	Tampa Stadium	32,370
3	February 15	at Orlando Renegades	W 24–14	2–1	Florida Citrus Bowl	33,000

== Regular season ==
Week	Date	Opponent	Result	Record	Venue	Attendance
1	February 24	at Birmingham Stallions	L 28–38	0–1	Legion Field	34,785
2	March 1	at Orlando Renegades	W 28–10	1–1	Florida Citrus Bowl	32,748
3	March 10	Los Angeles Express	W 35–24	2–1	Giants Stadium	58,741
4	March 17	at Baltimore Stars	L 9–29	2–2	Byrd Stadium	31,026
5	March 24	Tampa Bay Bandits	W 28–24	3–2	Giants Stadium	41,079
6	March 30	at Arizona Outlaws	L 13–31	3–3	Sun Devil Stadium	30,432
7	April 7	Houston Gamblers	W 31–25	4–3	Giants Stadium	34,573
8	April 14	Portland Breakers	W 34–7	5–3	Giants Stadium	38,245
9	April 19	at Memphis Showboats	W 21–18	6–3	Liberty Bowl Memorial Stadium	44,339
10	April 29	Orlando Renegades	W 24–7	7–3	Giants Stadium	38,084
11	May 5	at Jacksonville Bulls	L 20–30	7–4	Gator Bowl Stadium	60,100
12	May 12	Baltimore Stars	W 10–3	8–4	Giants Stadium	34,446
13	May 19	at Denver Gold	L 24–28	8–5	Mile High Stadium	29,129
14	May 26	at Tampa Bay Bandits	W 30–24 (OT)	9–5	Tampa Stadium	44,539
15	June 1	Memphis Showboats	W 17–7	10–5	Giants Stadium	45,682
16	June 10	Jacksonville Bulls	W 31–24	11–5	Giants Stadium	36,465
17	June 15	at Oakland Invaders	L 29–34	11–6	Oakland–Alameda County Coliseum	24,338
18	June 23	Birmingham Stallions	L 6–14	11–7	Giants Stadium	44,098

== Playoffs ==
Round	Date	Opponent	Result	Record	Venue	Attendance
Quarterfinal	July 1	Baltimore Stars	L 17–20	0–1	Giants Stadium	26,982
