= Ron Wheeler =

American football player (born 1958)

No. 82
- Position: Tight end

Personal information
- Born: September 5, 1958 (age 68); Oakland, California, U.S.
- Listed height: 6 ft 5 in (1.96 m)
- Listed weight: 235 lb (107 kg)

Career information
- High school: Fremont (Oakland)
- College: Washington
- NFL draft: 1981: undrafted

Career history
- Oakland Raiders (1981)*; Cleveland Browns (1982); Oakland Invaders (1983); Oklahoma/Arizona Outlaws (1984–1985); Calgary Stampeders (1987); Los Angeles Raiders (1987)
- * Offseason or practice squad member only

Career NFL statistics
- Games played: 3
- Receptions: 3
- Receiving yards: 61
- Receiving touchdowns: 0
- Stats at Pro Football Reference

Ronald Wayne Wheeler (born September 5, 1958) is an American former professional football player who was a tight end in the National Football League (NFL), Canadian Football League (CFL) and United States Football League (USFL). He played college football for the Washington Huskies.

== College career ==
Wheeler began his collegiate career at Merritt College before transferring to the University of Washington after his sophomore year. In 1979 he played in 11 games for the Huskies and caught two passes for ten yards.

== Professional career ==
Wheeler was signed by the Oakland Raiders as an undrafted free agent in 1981, but was released at the end of training camp. He was signed by the Cleveland Browns in 1982 but spent the entire season on injured reserve after injuring his knee in training camp.

Wheeler was signed by the Oakland Invaders of the United States Football League (USFL) in 1983 and caught 5 passes for 32 yards during the season. He was selected by the Oklahoma Outlaws in the 1984 USFL Expansion Draft and was Oklahoma's starting tight end, leading the team with 51 receptions along with 651 yards and two touchdowns. Wheeler stayed with the team after the merged with the Arizona Wranglers the following season to become the Arizona Outlaws and had 35 receptions for 487 yards and five touchdowns.

He started 1987 as a member of the Calgary Stampeders of the Canadian Football League and had 22 receptions for 340 yards and one touchdown. He left the team and was signed by the Los Angeles Raiders in October 1987 as a replacement player during the 1987 NFL players strike and caught three passes for 61 yards before being released when the strike ended.
