= Matt Courtney =

American football player (born 1963)

No. 45
- Position: Defensive back

Personal information
- Born: December 21, 1961 (age 64); Greeley, Colorado, U.S.
- Listed height: 5 ft 11 in (1.80 m)
- Listed weight: 194 lb (88 kg)

Career information
- High school: Arapahoe (CO)
- College: Idaho State
- NFL draft: 1984: undrafted

Career history
- Jacksonville Bulls (1984); San Francisco 49ers (1987)
- Stats at Pro Football Reference

Matthew Carter Courtney (born December 21, 1961) is an American former professional football player who was a defensive back for the San Francisco 49ers of the National Football League (NFL) and the Jacksonville Bulls in the United States Football League (USFL). He played college football for the Idaho State Bengals.
