= 1984 USFL season =

Second season of the United States Football League

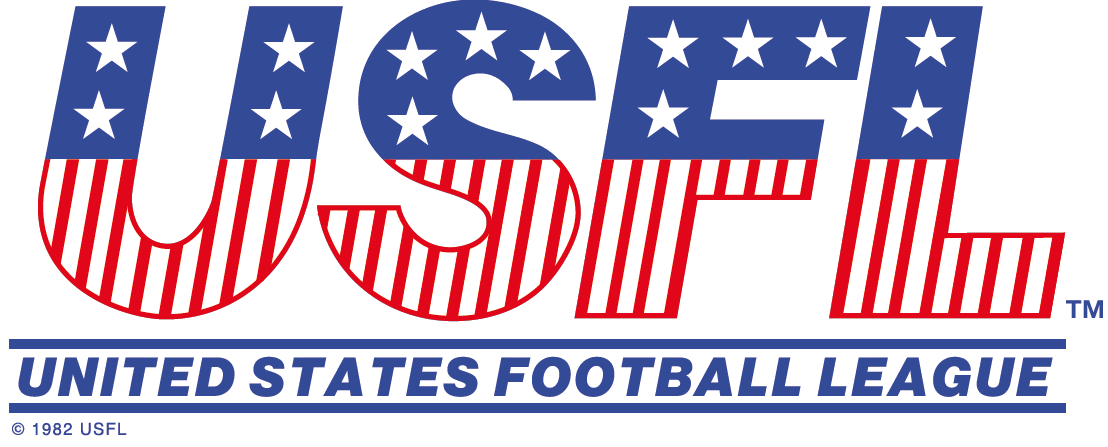
- Duration: February 26 – June 25, 1984
- Eastern Conference champions champions: Philadelphia Stars
- Western Conference champions champions: Arizona Wranglers
- Date: July 15, 1984
- Finals venue: Tampa Stadium, Tampa, Florida
- Finals champions: Philadelphia Stars

Seasons
- 1983 1985

USFL teams: Pacific, Central, Southern, Atlantic

The 1984 USFL season was the second season of the United States Football League.

== Rule changes ==
- The USFL added the side judge to the game officials, making a seven-man crew.
- Teams played preseason games in 1984. There had been no preseason games in 1983.

== Franchise changes ==
- Boston Breakers are sold and relocate to New Orleans, Louisiana as the New Orleans Breakers on October 18, 1983.
- Six expansion teams: Houston Gamblers, Jacksonville Bulls, Memphis Showboats, Oklahoma Outlaws, Pittsburgh Maulers, and San Antonio Gunslingers
- Chicago Blitz's owner buys Arizona Wranglers and sells Blitz, all but two Blitz players are traded to Arizona, all but two Wranglers players are traded to Chicago. The Blitz coaches also go to Arizona, with Chicago acquiring a new coaching staff in 1984. The franchises also trade draft choices.

== General news ==
On September 21, 1983, the New Jersey Generals were sold to Donald Trump.

On October 19, 1983, the United States Football League awarded the 1984 USFL Champion Game to Tampa Stadium in Tampa, FL and the 1985 USFL Championship Game to the Pontiac Silverdome in Pontiac, MI.

On February 15, the USFL took control of the Chicago Blitz.

The Denver Gold were sold during the 1984 season.

In May 1984, the USFL announced a "new" Chicago franchise would be created for the 1985 season.

Players vote to form a union, United States Football League Players Association, with former Buffalo Bills linebacker Doug Allen serving as executive director.

Philadelphia and Tampa Bay played in a post season exhibition game billed as "The Jetsave Challenge Cup" in Wembley Stadium on July 21. Philadelphia won 24–21.

On August 22, 1984, the owners voted to move to a fall schedule starting in 1986.

On October 19, 1984, the owners reaffirmed the move to the fall.

== Regular season ==
W = Wins, L = Losses, T = Ties, PCT= Winning Percentage, PF= Points For, PA = Points Against

y = Division Champion, x = Wild Card

Eastern Conference
Atlantic Division
Team	W	L	T	PCT	PF	PA	Stadium	1984 Capacity	Avg. Att.	Avg. % filled	Coach
y-Philadelphia Stars	16	2	0	.889	479	225	Veterans Stadium	72,204	28,668	40%	Jim Mora
x-New Jersey Generals	14	4	0	.778	430	312	Giants Stadium	76,891	37,716	49%	Walt Michaels
Pittsburgh Maulers	3	15	0	.167	259	379	Three Rivers Stadium	59,000	22,858	39%	Joe Pendry/Ellis Rainsberger
Washington Federals	3	15	0	.167	270	492	RFK Stadium	54,794	7,694	14%	Ray Jauch/Dick Bielski
Southern Division
Team	W	L	T	PCT	PF	PA	Stadium	1984 Capacity	Avg. Att.	Avg. % filled	Coach
y-Birmingham Stallions	14	4	0	.778	539	316	Legion Field	77,000	36,850	48%	Rollie Dotsch
x-Tampa Bay Bandits	14	4	0	.778	498	347	Tampa Stadium	72,812	46,158	63%	Steve Spurrier
New Orleans Breakers	8	10	0	.444	349	395	Louisiana Superdome	72,675	30,557	42%	Dick Coury
Memphis Showboats	7	11	0	.389	320	455	Liberty Bowl Memorial Stadium	50,180	27,599	55%	Pepper Rodgers
Jacksonville Bulls	6	12	0	.333	327	455	Gator Bowl Stadium	80,100	46,730	58%	Lindy Infante

Western Conference
Pacific Division
Team	W	L	T	PCT	PF	PA	Stadium	1984 Capacity	Avg. Att.	Avg. % filled	Coach
y-Los Angeles Express	10	8	0	.556	338	373	Los Angeles Memorial Coliseum	94,000	15,361	16%	John Hadl
x-Arizona Wranglers	10	8	0	.556	502	284	Sun Devil Stadium	70,030	25,568	37%	George Allen
Denver Gold	9	9	0	.500	356	413	Mile High Stadium	75,123	33,953	45%	Craig Morton
Oakland Invaders	7	11	0	.389	242	348	Oakland–Alameda County Coliseum	54,615	23,644	43%	John Ralston/Chuck Hutchison
Central Division
Team	W	L	T	PCT	PF	PA	Stadium	1984 Capacity	Avg. Att.	Avg. % filled	Coach
y-Houston Gamblers	13	5	0	.722	618	400	Houston Astrodome	47,695	28,152	59%	Jack Pardee
x-Michigan Panthers	10	8	0	.556	400	382	Pontiac Silverdome	80,638	32,457	40%	Jim Stanley
San Antonio Gunslingers	7	11	0	.389	309	325	Alamo Stadium	32,000	15,444	48%	Gil Steinke
Oklahoma Outlaws	6	12	0	.333	251	459	Skelly Stadium	40,235	21,038	52%	Woody Widenhofer
Chicago Blitz	5	13	0	.278	340	466	Soldier Field	65,793	7,455	11%	Marv Levy

Birmingham won the Southern Division championship over Tampa Bay based on a division record tiebreaker advantage (7–1-0 to 6–2). Birmingham and Tampa Bay tied in the first tiebreaking step, head-to-head (1–1).

Tampa Bay won the tiebreaker over New Jersey for the 3rd seed based on winning the head-to-head game.

Los Angeles won the Pacific Division championship over Arizona based on a conference record tiebreaker advantage (7–4 to 5–6). Los Angeles and Arizona tied in the first two tiebreaking steps, head-to-head (1–1) and best divisional record (3–3).

Michigan won the tiebreaker over Arizona for the 3rd seed based on winning the head-to-head game.

Pittsburgh finished ahead of Washington based on a head-to-head tiebreaker advantage (2–0).

== Playoffs ==
Away team	Score	Home team	Date
Divisional playoffs
New Jersey Generals	7–28	Philadelphia Stars	June 30, 1984
Michigan Panthers	21–27 (3OT)	Los Angeles Express	June 30, 1984
Tampa Bay Bandits	17–36	Birmingham Stallions	July 1, 1984
Arizona Wranglers	17–16	Houston Gamblers	July 1, 1984
Conference Championships
Arizona Wranglers	35–23	Los Angeles Express	July 7, 1984
Birmingham Stallions	10–20	Philadelphia Stars	July 8, 1984
USFL Championship Game Tampa Stadium, Tampa Bay, Florida
Philadelphia Stars	23–3	Arizona Wranglers	July 15, 1984

Divisional playoffs
A1	Philadelphia	28
A2	New Jersey	7
S1	Birmingham	36
S2	Tampa Bay	17
P1	Los Angeles	27 (3OT)
C2	Michigan	21
P2	Arizona	17
C1	Houston	16

Conference Championships
A1	Philadelphia	20
S1	Birmingham	10
P1	Los Angeles	23
P2	Arizona	35

USFL Championship
A1	Philadelphia	23
P2	Arizona	3

=== USFL Championship Game ===
1984 USFL Championship Game
Philadelphia Stars (18-2)	Arizona Wranglers (12-8)
23	3
Head coach: Jim Mora	Head coach: George Allen
	1	2	3	4	Total
PHI	13	0	0	10	23
ARI	0	3	0	0	3
- Date: July 15, 1984
- Stadium: Tampa Stadium; Tampa, Florida
- MVP: Chuck Fusina, quarterback
- Referee: Verle Sorgen
- Attendance: 52,662

Ceremonies
- National anthem: Alabama
- Halftime show: Chamberlain Chiefettes, Just Kids, Mary May Dance Studio, Suncoast Girl Scout Council, Suncoast Twirlers, Good Time Cloggers, Berry Patch Cloggers, Sun Country Cloggers and May's Twirling Cadets

TV in the United States
- Network: ABC
- Announcers: Keith Jackson and Lynn Swann
- Nielsen ratings: 9.7

Radio in the United States
- Network: ABC Radio Networks
- Announcers: Fred Manfra and Paul Hornung

July 15 (at Tampa, Florida)

- Philadelphia 23, Arizona 3

== Statistics ==
=== 1984 regular season stat leaders ===
1984 Passing Leaders (over 100 pass attempts & 55+ QB rating)
Name, Team	Att	Comp	%	yards	YDs/Att	TD	TD %	INT	INT %	Rating
Chuck Fusina, PHIL	465	302	64.9	3837	8.25	31	6.7	9	1.9	104.7
Fred Mortensen, DENV	100	64	64.0	994	9.94	4	4.0	2	2.0	101.8
Cliff Stoudt, BIRM	366	212	57.9	3121	8.53	26	7.1	7	1.9	101.6
Jim Kelly, HOU	587	370	63.0	5219	8.89	44	7.5	26	4.4	98.2
Mike Kelley, MEM	120	82	68.3	1014	8.45	8	6.7	6	5.0	95.6
Greg Landry, AZ	449	283	63.0	3534	7.87	26	5.8	15	3.3	92.8
John Reaves, TB	544	313	57.5	4092	7.52	28	5.1	16	2.9	86.3
Brian Sipe, NJ	324	192	59.3	2540	7.84	17	5.2	15	4.6	82.3
Walter Lewis, MEM	276	161	58.3	1862	6.75	15	5.4	10	3.6	81.8
Steve Young, LA	310	179	57.7	2361	7.62	10	3.2	9	2.9	80.6
Craig Penrose, DENV	262	158	60.3	1984	7.57	12	4.6	14	5.3	76.9
Bobby Hebert, MICH	500	272	54.4	3758	7.52	24	4.8	22	4.4	76.4
Fred Besana, OAK	446	257	57.6	2792	6.26	14	3.1	12	2.7	75.4
Robbie Mahfouz, JACK	309	180	58.3	2174	7.04	11	3.6	13	4.2	74.3
Mike Hohensee, WASH	401	231	57.6	2766	6.90	17	4.2	20	5.0	72.2
Johnnie Walton, NO	512	280	54.7	3554	6.94	17	3.3	19	3.7	72.2
Rick Neuheisel, SA	383	211	55.1	2542	6.64	14	3.7	15	3.9	71.5
Matt Robinson, JACK	235	125	53.2	1687	7.18	7	3.0	12	5.1	65.0
Glenn Carano, PITT	354	190	53.7	2368	6.69	13	3.7	19	5.4	64.6
Alan Risher, AZ	103	63	61.2	722	7.01	3	2.9	7	6.8	63.7
Ron Reeve, DENV	140	72	51.4	843	6.02	2	1.4	4	2.9	62.9
Tom Rozantz, PITT	130	63	48.5	878	6.75	4	3.1	6	4.6	61.6
Doug Williams, OKL	528	261	49.4	3084	5.84	15	2.8	21	4.0	60.5
Vince Evans, CHIC	411	200	48.7	2624	6.38	14	3.4	22	5.4	58.3

1984 Rushing leaders
Name, Team	Att	Yds	Ave.	TDs
Joe Cribbs, BIRM	297	1467	4.9	8
Kelvin Bryant, PHIL	297	1406	4.7	13
Herschel Walker, NJ	293	1339	4.6	16
Buford Jordan, NO	214	1276	6.0	8
Tim Spencer, AZ	227	1212	5.3	17
Curtis Bledsoe, WASH	246	1080	4.4	7
Maurice Carthon, NJ	238	1042	4.4	11
Kevin Long, AZ	225	1010	4.5	15
Greg Boone, TB	193	1009	5.2	8
Gary Anderson, TB	267	1008	3.8	19
Todd Fowler, HOU	170	1003	5.9	11
John Williams, MICH	197	984	5.0	8
Harry Sydney, DENV	230	961	4.2	10
Larry Canada, CHIC	169	915	5.4	7
Kevin Nelson, LA	216	828	3.8	7
Mike Rozier, PITT	223	792	3.6	3
Leon Perry, BIRM	189	774	4.1	13
Eric Jordan, OAK	135	744	5.5	6
Alan Reid, MEM	191	723	3.8	3
Sam Harrell, HOU	120	697	5.8	14
Marcus Dupree, NO	145	684	4.7	9
Mel Gray, LA	133	625	4.7	3
Tom Newton, OAK	146	571	3.9	5
Walter Lewis, MEM	60	552	9.2	5
Ken Lacy, MICH	134	548	4.1	2
Steve Young, LA	79	515	6.5	7
Scott Stamper, SA	123	500	4.1	3

1984 Receiving Leaders
Name, Team	Rec	Yds	Ave.	TDs
Richard Johnson, HOU	115	1455	12.7	15
Ricky Sanders, HOU	101	1378	13.6	11
Joey Walters, WASH	98	1410	14.4	13
Trumaine Johnson, AZ	90	1268	14.1	13
Jim Smith, BIRM	89	1481	16.6	8
Eric Truvillion, TB	70	1044	14.9	9
Marvin Harvey, TB	70	938	13.4	9
Gary Anderson, TB	66	682	10.3	2
Dan Ross, NO	65	833	12.8	2
Gordon Banks, OAK	64	937	14.6	5
Greg Anderson, PITT	63	994	15.8	6
Derek Holloway, MICH	62	1219	19.7	9
Derrick Crawford, MEM	61	703	11.5	12
JoJo Townsell, LA	58	889	15.3	7
Gary Shirk, MEM	57	604	10.6	2
Willie Collier, PHIL	56	757	13.5	7
Frank Lockett, NO	56	1199	21.4	8
Gary Clark, JACK	56	760	13.6	2
Scott Fitzkee, PHIL	55	895	16.3	9
Mike Cobb, MICH	54	573	10.6	5
Billy Taylor, WASH	51	387	7.6	1
Jackie Flowers, CHIC/PITT	51	904	17.7	8
Ron Wheeler, OKL	51	651	12.8	2
Willie Gillespie, TB	50	803	16.1	5
Alphonso Williams, OKL	50	1087	21.7	7
Marcus Anderson, CHIC	50	940	18.8	5
Kelvin Bryant, PHIL	48	453	9.4	1
Paul Bergmann, JACK	48	647	13.5	3
Larry Canada, CHIC	48	358	7.5	2
Lenny Willis, AZ	48	814	17.0	7
Steve Folsom, PHIL	46	485	10.5	6
Tim Spencer, AZ	46	589	12.8	2
Jerry Gordon, SA	45	648	14.4	4
Buford Jordan, NO	45	427	9.5	4
Perry Kemp, JACK	44	730	16.6	2

=== 1984 USFL regular season sortable offensive team statistics ===
Team	Pts.	Ave.	Rank	Total Yards	Ave.	Rank	Rush. Yards	Ave.	Rank	Pass. Yards	Ave.	Rank	Sacks Allowed	Ave.	Rank	Pens.	Avg.	Rank
Houston	618	34.3	1	7684	427	1	2373	132	7	5311	295	1	82	4.56	18	148	8.22	17
Birmingham	539	29.9	2	6714	373	2	3313	184	1	3401	189	9	30	1.67	3	100	5.56	4
Arizona	502	27.9	3	6709	373	3	2719	151	4	3990	222	3	40	2.22	7	154	8.56	18
Tampa Bay	498	27.7	4	6634	369	4	2341	130	8	4293	239	2	30	1.67	3	106	5.89	6
Philadelphia	479	26.6	5	6426	357	5	2820	157	3	3606	200	8	45	2.50	11	121	6.72	12
New Jersey	430	23.9	6	5553	309	9	2848	158	2	2705	150	16	20	1.11	2	88	4.89	2
Michigan	400	22.2	7	6030	335	7	2194	122	11	3836	213	4	44	2.44	9	112	6.22	7
Denver	356	19.8	8	5325	296	12	2056	114	14	3269	182	11	52	2.89	12	121	6.72	12
New Orleans	349	19.4	9	6400	356	6	2589	144	5	3811	212	5	13	0.72	1	133	7.39	15
Chicago	340	18.9	10	5361	298	11	2230	124	9	3131	174	13	38	2.11	5	124	6.89	14
Los Angeles	338	18.8	11	5671	315	8	2464	137	6	3207	178	12	38	2.11	5	102	5.67	5
Jacksonville	327	18.2	12	5390	299	10	1731	96	17	3659	203	6	62	3.44	16	74	4.11	1
Memphis	320	17.8	13	4895	272	16	2163	120	12	2732	152	15	61	3.39	15	89	4.94	3
San Antonio	309	17.2	14	4808	267	17	2205	123	10	2603	145	17	60	3.33	14	115	6.39	8
Washington	270	15.0	15	5324	296	13	2002	111	16	3322	185	10	57	3.17	13	137	7.61	16
Pittsburgh	259	14.4	16	4909	273	15	2011	112	15	2898	161	14	44	2.44	9	118	6.56	9
Oklahoma	251	13.9	17	5152	286	14	1537	85	18	3615	201	7	40	2.22	7	120	6.67	11
Oakland	242	13.4	18	4592	255	18	2150	119	13	2442	136	18	69	3.83	17	119	6.61	10

=== 1984 USFL regular season sortable defensive team statistics ===
Team	Pts.	Ave.	Rank	Total Yards	Ave.	Rank	Rush. Yards	Ave.	Rank	Pass. Yards	Ave.	Rank	Sacks	Ave.	Rank	Pens.	Ave.	Rank
Philadelphia	225	12.5	1	4863	270	2	1859	103	1	3004	167	2	48	2.67	7	111	6.17	5
Arizona	284	15.8	2	4517	251	1	2061	115	6	2456	136	1	73	4.05	1	138	7.67	17
New Jersey	312	17.3	3	5341	297	4	1992	111	4	3349	186	8	34	1.89	16	111	6.17	5
Birmingham	316	17.6	4	5541	308	6	1869	104	2	3672	204	14	45	2.50	9	118	6.56	11
San Antonio	325	18.1	5	5752	320	11	1910	106	3	3842	213	17	49	2.72	6	99	5.50	1
Tampa Bay	347	19.3	6	5583	310	8	2009	112	5	3574	199	10	43	2.39	11	111	6.17	5
Oakland	348	19.3	7	5911	328	13	2590	144	13	3321	185	7	53	2.94	4	122	6.77	14
Pittsburgh	373	20.7	8	5742	319	10	2633	146	15	3109	173	4	48	2.67	7	114	6.33	9
Los Angeles	379	21.1	9	5508	306	5	2207	123	8	3301	183	6	54	3.00	3	114	6.33	9
Michigan	382	21.2	10	5299	294	3	2268	126	9	3031	168	3	44	2.44	10	121	6.72	13
New Orleans	395	21.9	11	5573	310	7	2277	127	10	3296	183	5	40	2.22	14	99	5.50	1
Houston	400	22.2	12	5793	322	12	2136	119	7	3657	203	13	63	3.50	2	120	6.67	12
Denver	413	22.9	13	6196	344	15	2617	145	14	3579	199	11	51	2.83	5	131	7.27	16
Jacksonville	455	25.3	14	6328	352	16	2721	151	16	3607	200	12	27	1.50	18	130	7.22	15
Memphis	455	25.3	15	6116	340	14	2289	127	11	3827	213	15	30	1.67	17	99	5.50	1
Oklahoma	459	25.5	16	5704	317	9	2296	128	12	3408	189	9	43	2.39	11	111	6.17	5
Chicago	466	25.9	17	6877	382	17	3037	169	18	3840	213	16	36	2.00	15	141	7.83	18
Washington	492	27.3	18	6933	385	18	2975	165	17	3958	220	18	43	2.39	11	110	6.11	4

== Awards ==
1984 USFL All-League Team

- WR Trumaine Johnson, AZ
- WR Richard Johnson, HOU
- TE Dan Ross, NO
- T Irv Eatman, PHIL
- T Pat Phenix, BIRM
- G Buddy Aydelette, BIRM
- G Chuck Commiskey, PHIL
- C Bart Oates, PHIL
- QB Jim Kelly, HOU
- HB Joe Cribbs, BIRM
- HB Kelvin Bryant, PHIL
- DE Pete Catan, HOU
- DE John Lee, AZ
- DT Kit Lathrop, AZ
- NT Pete Kugler, PHIL
- LB Kiki DeAyala, HOU
- LB Jim LeClair, NJ
- LB Sam Mills, PHIL
- LB Ed Smith, AZ
- CB Peter Raeford, SA
- CB Garcia Lane, PHIL
- S Marcus Quinn, OAKL
- S Mike Lush, PHIL
- K Toni Fritsch, HOU
- KR Derrick Crawford, MEM
- P Stan Talley, OAKL
- PR David Martin, DENV
- MVP —QB Jim Kelly, HOU
- Coach of the year – Jim Mora, PHIL
- Defensive Player of the year —S Marcus Quinn, OAKL

1984 The Sporting News USFL All-Star Team

- WR Trumaine Johnson, AZ
- WR Joey Walters, WASH
- TE Dan Ross, NO
- T Irv Eatman, PHIL
- T Gary Zimmerman, LA
- G Buddy Aydelette, BIRM
- G Gerry Raymond, OAKL
- C Wayne Radloff, MICH
- QB Chuck Fusina, PHIL
- HB Joe Cribbs, BIRM
- HB Kelvin Bryant, PHIL
- DE Pete Catan, HOU
- DE Karl Lorch, AZ
- DT Kit Lathrop, AZ
- LB James Harrell, TB
- LB Jim LeClair, NJ
- LB John Corker, MICH
- LB Howard Carson, LA
- CB Jerry Holmes, PITT
- CB David Martin, DENV
- S Marcus Quinn, OAKL
- S Gary Barbaro, NJ
- K Tony Zendejas, LA
- KR Derrick Crawford, MEM
- P Sean Landeta, PHIL
- PR David Martin, DENV
- Rookie of the year — QB Jim Kelly, HOU
- Player of the year—QB Chuck Fusina, PHIL
- Coach of the year -- Jim Mora, PHIL
- Executive of the year -- Carl Peterson, PHIL

== See also ==
- 1984 NFL season
