= Larry Mason (American football) =

American gridiron football player (born 1961)

No. 42, 34
- Position: Running back

Personal information
- Born: March 21, 1961 (age 65); Birmingham, Alabama
- Listed height: 5 ft 11 in (1.80 m)
- Listed weight: 205 lb (93 kg)

Career information
- High school: McAdory
- College: Troy State
- NFL draft: 1983: undrafted

Career history
- Miami Dolphins (1983)*; Jacksonville Bulls (1984-1985); Calgary Stampeders (1985); Cleveland Browns (1987); Green Bay Packers (1988)
- * Offseason or practice squad member only
- Stats at Pro Football Reference

Larry Mason is a former running back in the National Football League and the United States Football League.

== Biography ==
Mason was born on March 21, 1961, in Birmingham, Alabama. He now owns a fencing company in the Birmingham area.

== Career ==
Mason was a member of the Jacksonville Bulls of the USFL in 1984 and 1985. He then joined the Cleveland Browns during the 1987 NFL season, playing during the 1987 NFL Players Strike. The following season, he played for the Green Bay Packers. Mason also played for the Calgary Stampeders of the CFL in 1985. He was Calgary's leading rusher during the 1985 season, despite only playing five games.

He played at the collegiate level at Troy State University and the University of Southern Mississippi.
