= Logan Young =

American businessman and athletic booster

- Born: Logan Curtis Brewer Young Jr. October 10, 1940; Osceola, Arkansas, U.S.
- Died: April 11, 2006 (aged 65); Memphis, Tennessee, U.S.
- Occupation: Businessman

Logan Curtis Brewer Young Jr. (1940–2006) was a Memphis, Tennessee businessman and a booster for the University of Alabama football program. In 2005, Young was found guilty in federal court for charges relating to his role in a scheme to pay a high school football coach $150,000 to help recruit a player to Alabama.

== Personal ==
Young graduated from Osceola High School in Osceola, Arkansas and then attended Vanderbilt University in Nashville, Tennessee, during which time he befriended legendary Alabama football coach, Bear Bryant, through his father. Young inherited an Arkansas food manufacturing company and was part-owner of the Memphis Showboats, a United States Football League team in the 1980s.

== Alabama scandal ==
=== NCAA sanctions ===
During the 2000 season, an assistant football coach at Trezevant High School in Memphis claimed that Young had paid Lynn Lang, the Trezevant head football coach, approximately $150,000 to encourage defensive lineman Albert Means to sign with Alabama. Following the investigation by the NCAA, Alabama received a five-year probation, a two-year bowl ban, and a reduced number of scholarships that the university could award—limiting them by twenty-one scholarships over the next three years.

=== Alabama sanctions ===
Amid fears that the NCAA was considering hitting the school with a "death penalty," which would have shut down the football team for at least one year, Alabama permanently disassociated itself from Young in 2000. Alabama not only banned him from any involvement with the athletic program, but stripped him of his $40,000 luxury box at Bryant–Denny Stadium and canceled an insurance policy that would have paid $500,000 toward the Paul "Bear" Bryant Museum on campus upon Young's death.

Young was convicted in federal court on conspiracy to commit racketeering, crossing state lines to commit racketeering, and arranging bank withdrawals to cover up a crime. Young's defense claimed Lang, who was also convicted of a racketeering conspiracy, was motivated to testify against Young in exchange for a lighter sentence. He was eventually sentenced to six months in jail, though he continued to firmly deny any wrongdoing.

== Death ==
On April 11, 2006, Young was found dead in his home in Memphis. Originally thought to be a homicide due to the large amount of blood found throughout the house, local police concluded that Young's death was accidental. This conclusion however is not without controversy. According to Homicide Lt. Joe Scott in a press conference, Young tripped while carrying a salad and soft drink up a set of stairs and hit his head on an iron railing. The fall onto the railing opened a large gash across the top of Young's head, causing him to drop to the floor bleeding profusely. After lying on the floor for some time, Young got up and walked bleeding through several rooms of his house before ending up in his second-floor bedroom. According to Scott, Young walked past several telephones but didn't place an emergency call.

An appeal of the federal conviction on money laundering and conspiracy charges was pending when Young died.
