= Woody Widenhofer =

American football player and coach (1943–2020)

Biographical details
- Born: January 20, 1943; Butler, Pennsylvania, U.S.
- Died: March 22, 2020 (aged 77)

Playing career
- 1961–1964: Missouri
- Position: Linebacker

Coaching career (HC unless noted)
- 1969–1970: Michigan State (DL)
- 1971: Eastern Michigan (LB)
- 1972: Minnesota (LB)
- 1973–1978: Pittsburgh Steelers (LB)
- 1979–1983: Pittsburgh Steelers (DC)
- 1984: Oklahoma Outlaws
- 1985–1988: Missouri
- 1989–1992: Detroit Lions (DC)
- 1993–1994: Cleveland Browns (LB)
- 1995–1996: Vanderbilt (DC)
- 1997–2001: Vanderbilt
- 2003–2004: Southeastern Louisiana (DC)
- 2005–2007: New Mexico State (DC)

Head coaching record
- Overall: 27–71–1 (college)

Robert "Woody" Widenhofer (January 20, 1943 – March 22, 2020) was an American college football head coach and longtime assistant coach in the National Football League (NFL). Widenhofer is best known for helping the Pittsburgh Steelers "Steel Curtain" defense that won four Super Bowls in the 1970s. He later served unsuccessful tenures as head coach at the University of Missouri and Vanderbilt University.

Widenhofer attended Riverview High School in Riverview, Michigan, and played linebacker at Missouri from 1961 to 1964 under coach Dan Devine. He went on to receive a master's degree at Michigan State University.

== Coaching career ==
After graduating from the University of Missouri in 1964, Widenhofer became an assistant coach under head coach Tom McCartney at Detroit Holy Redeemer High School in the fall of 1965. He began his college coaching career as a graduate assistant at Michigan State where he coached the defensive line. Widenhofer then moved to Eastern Michigan and Minnesota where he served as linebackers coach. After several years as a college assistant, Widenhofer was hired to coach linebackers for the Steelers in 1973. He was promoted to defensive coordinator in 1979. By the time he left after the 1983 season, Widenhofer had won four Super Bowls and made the postseason nine times.

He spent one year as head coach of the short-lived United States Football League team, the Oklahoma Outlaws, before landing an opportunity at his alma mater, bolstered by a much-remembered ad campaign that urged Tigers fans to "climb on Woody's Wagon". While Widenhofer's team showed slow improvements, he only managed a 12–33–1 record in four seasons at Missouri from 1985 to 1988.

Widenhofer returned to the NFL for six years as an assistant coach, serving as defensive coordinator for the Detroit Lions under head coach Wayne Fontes, followed by two years as linebackers coach with the Cleveland Browns under head coach Bill Belichick. He then joined friend Rod Dowhower's staff at Vanderbilt to serve as defensive coordinator. When Dowhower was fired after the 1996 season, Widenhofer was promoted to head coach. In 1997, his Vanderbilt team led the SEC in total defense. However, his second tenure as head coach was no easier than the first, as Widenhofer compiled only a 15–37 record in five seasons at the helm for VU. Widenhofer resigned in 2001. While unsuccessful on the field, the NCAA announced that Vanderbilt led the nation in football graduation percentage with a perfect 100% the year he left.

Widenhofer considered retiring, but ultimately joined friend Hal Mumme as an assistant at Southeastern Louisiana University and later New Mexico State University. Widenhofer announced he was retiring from coaching following the season finale game against Fresno State on November 30, 2007.

In January 2009 he was announced as the head coach of the Alabama Blackbirds of the United National Gridiron League, a new minor league that was scheduled to begin play in February 2009. The league's debut was repeatedly postponed due to financing issues, and in 2010 it suspended operations.

== Personal life ==
Widenhofer had five children: Kim, Stacy, Ryan, Ross, Katlyn and grandchildren Addison, Ava, Mia, Jackson, Sophie, Ainsley and Piper. After his recent retirement from football, Widenhofer resided in Florida with his wife Sabrina.

After leaving the Vanderbilt campus in 2001, Woody worked in a toll booth in Destin, Florida for three years. Woody stated that he didn't have anything else to do and enjoyed meeting people. However, his wife Sabrina, who works for Spirit Airlines, got transferred to Dallas, TX. Woody did not return to the Vanderbilt campus since his departure. He died on March 22, 2020, aged 77.

== Head coaching record ==
=== USFL ===
Team	Year	Regular Season					Postseason		
Team	Year	Won	Lost	Ties	Win %	Finish	Won	Lost	Win %
OKL	1984	6	12	0	.333	4th in Central Div.	0	0	.000
Total		6	12	0	.333				

=== College ===
Year	Team	Overall	Conference	Standing
Missouri Tigers (Big 8 Conference) (1985–1988)
1985	Missouri	1–10	1–6	T–7th
1986	Missouri	3–8	2–5	6th
1987	Missouri	5–6	3–4	5th
1988	Missouri	3–7–1	2–5	6th
Missouri:		12–31–1	8–20	
Vanderbilt Commodores (Southeastern Conference) (1997–2001)
1997	Vanderbilt	3–8	0–8	6th (Eastern)
1998	Vanderbilt	2–9	1–7	5th (Eastern)
1999	Vanderbilt	5–6	2–6	5th (Eastern)
2000	Vanderbilt	3–8	1–7	5th (Eastern)
2001	Vanderbilt	2–9	0–8	6th (Eastern)
Vanderbilt:		15–40	4–36	
Total:		27–71–1		
