= Fred Besana =

American football player (born 1954)

No. 14
- Position: Quarterback

Personal information
- Born: March 9, 1954 (age 72); Roseville, California, U.S.
- Listed height: 6 ft 4 in (1.93 m)
- Listed weight: 200 lb (91 kg)

Career information
- College: California
- NFL draft: 1977: 5th round, 115th overall pick

Career history
- Buffalo Bills (1977); New York Giants (1978); Twin Cities Cougars (1980–1982); Oakland Invaders (1983–1985)

Fred Besana (born March 9, 1954) is an American former professional football player who was a quarterback for the Oakland Invaders of the United States Football League (USFL). He played college football for the California Golden Bears. He was briefly on the rosters of the Buffalo Bills and the New York Giants of the National Football League (NFL), but never saw regular season action. He was selected by the Bills in the fifth round of the 1977 NFL draft.

== Early life and college ==
Born in Roseville, California, Besana played college football at the University of California, Berkeley for the California Golden Bears under head coach Mike White, where he was primarily a back-up to All-Americans Steve Bartkowski and Joe Roth. He started the first three games of the 1975 season.

== Professional career ==
Besana was selected by the Buffalo Bills in the fifth round (115th overall) of the 1977 NFL draft. He was active for two games in 1977 and two games in 1978, before being released by the Giants on August 13, 1979. With his NFL career effectively over, Besana returned to California and played minor league ball for the Twin Cities Cougars, based in Marysville, of the California Football League from 1980–1982, while he sold insurance and was a partner in a beer distributorship.

=== Oakland Invaders ===
The Oakland Invaders signed Besana on January 26, 1983, and he won the starting job for the Invaders under head coach John Ralston and led them to a 9–9 record and the Pacific Division title. The Invaders lost in the first round of the playoffs to the league's eventual champion, the Michigan Panthers, 37–21. Besana, age 29, was the league's second-ranked QB, behind Michigan's Bobby Hebert, spreading the ball around to four receivers who caught over 50 passes; he threw 21 touchdown passes and totaled 3,980 yards. Following the season, All-League tight end Raymond Chester retired and by the start of the next season big play threat wide receiver Wyatt Henderson would also be off the team.

Without two of his top four receivers to stretch the defense in 1984, opposing defenses were able to smother the Invader offense. In spite of a strong defense, the team lost its first nine games --- scoring a total of 82 points. Without a running game and with few good receiving options, Besana struggled. In the second half of the season, halfback Eric Jordan emerged as an effective feature back. Besana, Jordan, and WR Gordon Banks combined to reignite the offense. The team won 7 of their last 9 games.

Following the 1984 season the Invaders merged with the Michigan Panthers and Besana was forced to the bench backing up Hebert on the eventual Western Conference champions. The new team retained Jordan & Banks and added Michigan stars Albert Bentley, Anthony Carter, Derek Holloway, & John Williams. Besana did see the field a few times in 1985 with this team full of weapons, and he put up the third best QB rating in the league.

Following the folding of the USFL, Besana ran his beer distributorship in Yuba City and was a volunteer coach at Yuba College in Marysville.

== Career statistics ==
Year	Team	GP	Passing							
Year	Team	GP	Cmp	Att	Pct	Yds	Avg	TD	Int	Rtg
1983	Oakland Invaders	18	345	550	62.7	3,980	7.2	21	16	85.1
1984	Oakland Invaders	18	257	446	57.6	2,792	6.3	14	12	75.4
1985	Oakland Invaders	—	34	58	58.6	494	8.5	6	4	92.2
Career		36	636	1,054	60.3	7,266	6.9	41	32	84.2

== Family ==
His father, Fred Besana, played for the Baltimore Orioles in 1956.

== Video ==
- You Tube – interview with Keith Jackson of ABC sports – July 9, 1983
