= Jerry Gordon =

American radio broadcaster

Jerry Gordon is an American radio broadcaster. He is the afternoon news anchor on KNIH in Las Vegas, Nevada. His voice-over work included 10 years as "the voice of Disney." He previously worked at KSFO in San Francisco. He is originally from New York City, New York. He was born in Norwich, Connecticut.
