= JoJo Townsell =

American football player (born 1960)

No. 26, 83
- Position: Wide receiver

Personal information
- Born: November 4, 1960 (age 66); Reno, Nevada, U.S.
- Listed height: 5 ft 9 in (1.75 m)
- Listed weight: 180 lb (82 kg)

Career information
- High school: Hug (Reno, Nevada)
- College: UCLA (1979–1982)
- NFL draft: 1983: 3rd round, 78th overall pick

Career history
- Los Angeles Express (1983–1985); New York Jets (1985–1991)

Awards and highlights
- Second-team All-Pac-10 (1982)

Career NFL statistics
- Receptions: 70
- Receiving yards: 1,119
- Return yards: 1,360
- Total touchdowns: 8
- Stats at Pro Football Reference

Joseph Ray Townsell (born November 4, 1960) is an American former professional football player who was a wide receiver and return specialist in the National Football League (NFL) and United States Football League (USFL).

== Early life ==
Townsell attended Hug High School in Reno, Nevada, where he earned all-Zone and all-State honors; in 2004, he was inducted into the Nevada Interscholastic Activities Association Hall of Fame.

== College career ==
Townsell attended University of California, Los Angeles (UCLA), where he was a sociology major. He played college football for the UCLA Bruins as a four-year starter from 1979 to 1982.

On October 25, 1980, he had a 100-yard kickoff return touchdown in a 32–9 UCLA win against California.

On September 11, 1982, he set a UCLA record with four receiving touchdowns in one game, a 41–10 UCLA win against Long Beach State. For the 1982 season, he was named second-team All-Pac-10.

== Professional career ==
In April 1983, Townsell was selected by the New York Jets in the third round of the 1983 NFL draft, and participated in Jets mini-camps. However, in June 1983, he signed a four-year, $110,000 per year, contract with the Los Angeles Express of the USFL. Two days after signing, in his first USFL game, Townsell had the game-winning receiving touchdown in a 17–13 Express win against the Arizona Wranglers.

On April 14, 1984, he had a USFL-record 249 receiving yards in a game against the Memphis Showboats.

In August 1985, he bought out his USFL contract and signed a three-year contract with the Jets.

On December 13, 1986, Townsell recorded a 93-yard kickoff return touchdown, in a 24–45 Jets loss to the Pittsburgh Steelers.

In 1989, Townsell led the Jets with 787 receiving yards, and 5 receiving touchdowns. He was named the Jets MVP for the 1989 season.

In week 5 of the 1990 season, Townsell suffered a turf toe injury; in June 1991, he had surgery to remove a bone in his big toe.

Townsell retired from professional football on October 25, 1991.

== Personal life ==
He is married to his wife, Suzi; they have two daughters.

In 1997, Townsell and Suzi founded the Me-For-Incredible-Youth (MeFiYi) Foundation, a non-profit organization that aims to help Nevada youth.
