= Robert P. Mahfouz =

American football player (born 1959)

Robert P. Mahfouz (born October 30, 1959, in Metairie, Louisiana) is a former professional American football player. Mahfouz became the starting quarterback for the Jacksonville Bulls of the USFL in 1984. He was invited to camp by the New Orleans Saints in 1982, but was not signed.

== College ==
Mahfouz played for the LSU Tigers football team from 1979 to 1980. While playing for LSU Mahfouz had 17 completions on 35 passing attempts for 262 yards. Mahfouz then transferred to Southeastern Louisiana University, where he is listed historically as #6 overall for passing yards per game (155.2, 1981), #10 overall for average yards per completion (14.5, 1981), #4 Average Yards Per Pass (8.1, 1981), #6 Passing Efficiency (131.3, 1981), #9 Pass Completion Percentage (55.9, 1981), and #6 Total Offense Per Game (162.5, 1981).

Mahfouz was a key member of one of the best comebacks in school history vs rival Northeast Louisiana. Down 40-21 with 11:34 remaining in the game, Mahfouz threw two touchdown passes to David Peterson and another to Todd Jones that were the highlights of a 29-point fourth quarter that changed the outcome of the game. Mahfouz finished the game with 298 yards and five touchdowns, walking away with the win.

== Professional ==
Robert Mahfouz played for the Jacksonville Bulls in the 1984 and 1985 seasons before he was released. He saw most of his playing time during the 1984 season, finishing with 2174 yards, 11 touchdowns and 14 interceptions. He had 180 completions in 309 passing attempts for a pass completion ratio of 58.3% in 1984. The team finished the season 6-12 and in fifth place in the Southern Division.
