= Houston Gamblers =

Football team

General information
- Founded: 1983
- Folded: 1986
- Headquartered: Astrodome in Houston, Texas
- Colors: Black, Gambler Red, Gray, White, Yellow-Gold

Personnel
- Owners: 1984 Alvin Lubetkin, Bernard Lerner, Dr. Jerry Argovitz, Fred Gerson; 1985 Alvin Lubetkin, Dr. Jerry Argovitz, Jay Roulier
- Head coach: 1984–1985 Jack Pardee (23-15)

Team history
- Houston Gamblers (1984–1985)

Home fields
- Astrodome (1984–1985)

League / conference affiliations
- United States Football League (1984–1985): Western Conference (1984–1985); Central Division (1984)

Championships
- Division championships: 1; 1984

Playoff appearances (2)
- 1984, 1985

The Houston Gamblers were an American football team that competed in the United States Football League in 1984 and 1985. The Gamblers were coached by veteran NFL head coach Jack Pardee in both their seasons. They were noteworthy for introducing former Middletown (Ohio) High School football coach Glenn "Tiger" Ellison's Run & Shoot offense to the world of pro football.

== The Run & Shoot puts the USFL on the map ==
Run & Shoot advocate and chief refiner Darell "Mouse" Davis was hired by the progressive Pardee to install the offense as the team's Offensive Coordinator. (Davis was a former head coach at Portland State University where he developed the St. Louis Cardinals' future two-time Pro Bowl quarterback Neil Lomax.) Led by former Miami Hurricanes QB Jim Kelly (who snubbed the NFL's Buffalo Bills to play in the USFL) the Gamblers wrecked secondaries across the USFL, getting national media attention in demolishing the league's single-season scoring record (the Gamblers scored 618 points in 1984; the 1983 USFL record was 456). Kelly became the USFL's answer to the NFL's Dan Marino, and the league's second superstar player (after Herschel Walker).

The Gamblers also got the attention of a few NFL teams. The run & shoot offense would be adopted as the base set for the Detroit Lions, Atlanta Falcons and the Houston Oilers. All three teams were in the upper half of the league in scoring while using the run & shoot. In spite of this fact, the offense was widely discredited as a gimmick in the NFL when none of the three teams won a Super Bowl. Even after those teams moved away from the run & shoot as their base sets, the influence of Mouse Davis and Jim Kelly left a lasting impact on the league. In the 1970s most teams ran the 2-back "pro-set" as their base offense with fixed routes. Today, almost all NFL teams incorporate extensive packages of 4-WR sets and option routes for WRs depending on coverages faced, innovations that are the basis of the run & shoot.

== The playoffs, 1985, and beyond ==
The Gamblers appeared in the playoffs in each of their two seasons, but suffered narrow first-round defeats both times. In 1984, the expansion Gamblers finished the regular season with the best record in the Western conference and were the favorites in the West to go to the championship game. They held a 16–3 lead over George Allen's star laden Arizona Wranglers with just 7 minutes remaining before falling 17–16 in a furious Wrangler comeback. The Wranglers would go on to play in the 1984 Championship Game.

Following the August 22, 1984 USFL owners meeting in which the majority of owners decided to move to playing in the fall, things started to crumble for the league, especially for teams in cities with existing NFL teams, like the Gamblers. Kelly, one of the more public faces of the USFL, voiced the concerns of many fans when he called the schedule switch "100 percent" wrong, saying, "It's the worst thing they could have done."

The Run N' Shoot attack of the Gamblers grew even stronger in 1985. Davis left to become head coach of the Denver Gold and was succeeded by special-teams coach John Jenkins. Jenkins's version of the Run N' Shoot brought more complexity and excitement to the Gamblers. In the first game of the season against the L.A. Express, down 31–13 with 8 minutes left in the 4th quarter, the Gamblers became the first professional football team to use a no-huddle offense before a two-minute drill. The no-huddle would later become Kelly's base offense with the Buffalo Bills. The so-called "hurry-up offense" allowed the Gamblers to come back to win the game 34–33, which Sports Illustrated dubbed "The Greatest Game Never Seen" because it was not televised. In the first 5 games in 1985, Jim Kelly had one of the hottest starts in professional football history. In Week 4, the Gamblers beat Mouse Davis's Denver Gold 36–17 in the first pro game to match two Run N' Shoot offenses. After this game Jim Kelly was on pace to throw for 7,434 yards and 78 touchdowns. But Kelly suffered a leg injury that sidelined him for the last six games of the season. However, if you combine Kelly's and backup quarterback Todd Dillon's stats together, they threw for a combined 6,118 yards (professional American-football record). The Gamblers offense set another record: for the first time ever in professional football, a team had 3 receivers each catch over 1,000 yards: Clarence Verdin, Gerald McNeil, and Richard Johnson. The Gamblers made the playoffs with a 10–8 record and again lost in a nailbiter to an excellent team, the 13–5 veteran, Cliff Stoudt/Joe Cribbs/Jim Smith-led Birmingham Stallions, 22–20.

As it turned out, that would be the last game the Gamblers would ever play. While the Gamblers had been a solid draw the year before, area fans were not about to abandon the Houston Oilers. Attendance dropped by almost 9,000 from 1984. The resulting financial problems were so severe that at one point, the Gamblers had trouble making payroll. They needed an advance from the league just to go to the playoffs. Although owner Jerry Argovitz had ultimately supported moving to the fall, he and his partners knew they could not even begin to compete with the Oilers and decided to get out.

After briefly entertaining an offer to move to New York City, they agreed to sell controlling interest to real estate magnate and future Miami Dolphins owner Stephen Ross. Just days later, Ross announced he was merging the Gamblers with the New Jersey Generals. Although the Generals were the surviving team, Ross would be a full partner with Generals owner Donald Trump, and Argovitz became the merged team's president. However, Ross backed out of the merger after discovering the Gamblers' debt load was larger than he anticipated. Trump reimbursed Ross for his interest and became sole owner. However, Trump retained the Gamblers' player contracts, so the deal was still widely reported as a merger. Trump immediately hired Pardee as coach. With an offense boasting Kelly and Walker, observers dubbed the new Generals the USFL's "dream team." Kelly was even featured on the cover of Sports Illustrated in a Generals uniform. That season however would never be played.

The most notable players on the team were Kelly, future Washington Redskins wide receiver Ricky Sanders, future Detroit Lions wide receiver Richard Johnson, future Indianapolis Colts kick returner Clarence Verdin, and future Cleveland Browns wide receiver Gerald McNeil. Todd Fowler, the featured running back on the team, was also notable as the first USFL player the rival NFL signed away from the league in 1985 (by the Dallas Cowboys).

== Giant dice game ==
The Gamblers were well known for a 7-Eleven promotion in which two huge dice were dropped onto the field from the roof of the Astrodome.

== 1984 schedule and results ==
Week	Date	Opponent	Result	Record	Venue	Attendance
Preseason
1	Bye					
2	February 4	vs. San Antonio Gunslingers	W 19–17	1–0	Harlingen, Texas	
3	February 11	at Jacksonville Bulls	W 34–22	2–0	Gator Bowl Stadium	24,680
4	February 18	vs. Oklahoma Outlaws	W 34–7	3–0	Lewis Field; Stillwater, Oklahoma	6,120
Regular season
1	February 26	at Tampa Bay Bandits	L 17–20	0–1	Tampa Stadium	42,915
2	March 5	at San Antonio Gunslingers	W 35–7	1–1	Alamo Stadium	10,023
3	March 11	at Chicago Blitz	W 45–36	2–1	Soldier Field	7,808
4	March 18	New Jersey Generals	W 32–25	3–1	Houston Astrodome	35,532
5	March 26	Michigan Panthers	L 34–52	3–2	Houston Astrodome	38,754
6	March 31	at Oklahoma Outlaws	L 28–31 (OT)	3–3	Skelly Stadium	17,266
7	April 9	Washington Federals	W 31–13	4–3	Houston Astrodome	16,710
8	April 16	at Oakland Invaders	W 35–27	5–3	Oakland-Alameda County Coliseum	18,320
9	April 21	Arizona Wranglers	W 37–24	6–3	Houston Astrodome	23,117
10	April 30	Los Angeles Express	L 24–27 (OT)	6–4	Houston Astrodome	30,727
11	May 6	at Michigan Panthers	L 28–31 (OT)	6–5	Pontiac Silverdome	29,068
12	May 12	at Pittsburgh Maulers	W 47–26	7–5	Three Rivers Stadium	24,880
13	May 20	Oklahoma Outlaws	W 31–12	8–5	Houston Astrodome	31,142
14	May 25	at Jacksonville Bulls	W 54–7	9–5	Gator Bowl Stadium	31,638
15	June 3	at Denver Gold	W 36–20	10–5	Mile High Stadium	50,057
16	June 10	Chicago Blitz	W 38–13	11–5	Houston Astrodome	24,243m
17	June 18	San Antonio Gunslingers	W 29–26	12–5	Houston Astrodome	30,184
18	June 25	Memphis Showboats	W 37–3	13–5	Houston Astrodome	22,963
Postseason
Divisional	July 1	Arizona Wranglers	L 16–17	0–1	Houston Astrodome	32,713

== 1985 schedule and results ==
Week	Date	Opponent	Result	Record	Venue	Attendance
Preseason
1	Bye					
2	February 9	vs. San Antonio Gunslingers	W 28–21	1–0	McAllen, Texas	
3	February 16	at Birmingham Stallions	W 20–10	2–0	Legion Field	
Regular season
1	February 24	at Los Angeles Express	W 34–33	1–0	Los Angeles Memorial Coliseum	18,828
2	March 3	at Tampa Bay Bandits	W 50–28	2–0	Tampa Stadium	42,291
3	March 10	at Oakland Invaders	W 42–7	3–0	Oakland-Alameda County Coliseum	16,037
4	March 18	Denver Gold	W 36–17	4–0	Houston Astrodome	33,747
5	March 24	Portland Breakers	W 27–20	5–0	Houston Astrodome	22,031
6	March 31	Baltimore Stars	L 14–27	5–1	Houston Astrodome	24,166
7	April 7	at New Jersey Generals	L 25–31	5–2	Giants Stadium	34,573
8	April 14	Los Angeles Express	L 17–18	5–3	Houston Astrodome	20,193
9	April 21	at Arizona Outlaws	W 33–17	6–3	Sun Devil Stadium	16,640
10	April 28	at San Antonio Gunslingers	W 38–29	7–3	Alamo Stadium	9,723
11	May 6	at Portland Breakers	W 45–7	8–3	Civic Stadium	18,457
12	May 12	at Memphis Showboats	L 15–17	8–4	Liberty Bowl Memorial Stadium	27,325
13	May 20	Jacksonville Bulls	L 17–20	8–5	Houston Astrodome	17,127
14	May 26	Arizona Outlaws	W 41–20	9–5	Houston Astrodome	12,696
15	June 3	Birmingham Stallions	L 27–29	9–6	Houston Astrodome	13,202
16	June 9	at Denver Gold	L 13–16	9–7	Mile High Stadium	12,553
17	June 17	San Antonio Gunslingers	W 49–21	10–7	Houston Astrodome	11,780
18	June 24	Oakland Invaders	L 21–31	10–8	Houston Astrodome	15,797
Playoffs
Quarterfinal	June 29	at Birmingham Stallions	L 20–22	0–1	Legion Field	18,500

== Single-season leaders ==
- Rushing Yards: 1009 (1984), Todd Fowler
- Receiving Yards: 1445 (1984), Richard Johnson
- Passing Yards: 5219 (1984), Jim Kelly (also league record)

== Season-by-season results ==
Season records
Season	W	L	T	Finish	Playoff results
1984	13	5	0	1st in Western	Lost in Quarterfinals (Arizona)
1985	10	8	0	3rd in Western	Lost in Quarterfinals (Birmingham)
Totals	23	13	0		
