= Memphis Showboats =

American football franchise in the USFL

General information
- Founded: 1983
- Folded: 1986
- Headquartered: Liberty Bowl Memorial Stadium in Memphis, Tennessee
- Colors: Scarlet, Silver, White

Personnel
- Owners: William Dunavant & Logan Young
- General manager: Steve Ehrhart
- Head coach: 1984–1985 Pepper Rodgers (19–19)

Team history
- Memphis Showboats (1984–1985)

Home fields
- Liberty Bowl Memorial Stadium (1984–1985)

League / conference affiliations
- United States Football League (1984–1985): Eastern Conference (1984–1985); Southern Division (1984)

Playoff appearances (1)
- 1985

The Memphis Showboats were an American football franchise in the United States Football League. They entered the league in its expansion in 1984 and made the 1985 playoffs, losing in the semifinal round to the Oakland Invaders. Perhaps the most prominent players on the Showboats' roster during their two seasons of existence were future Pro Football Hall of Fame member Reggie White and future professional wrestler "The Total Package" Lex Luger.

== History ==
Memphis food manufacturer Logan Young was awarded an expansion franchise for Memphis on July 17, 1983.

The team name was selected on August 14 via fan contest in The Commercial Appeal. "Showboats", a reference to the floating theaters and Memphis' music history, was suggested by 45 of the 21,052 submissions. It was one of three finalists alongside "Hound Dogs" and "Mudcats".

However, soon after hiring Memphis native and former college coach Pepper Rodgers as head coach and signing a lease to play in the Liberty Bowl Memorial Stadium, Young discovered that most of his assets were tied up in a trust fund that he couldn't access. Ultimately, he was forced to take on limited partners, then sell controlling interest to cotton magnate William Dunavant, remaining as team president.

Despite White's play, the Showboats finished fourth in the Southern Division and missed the playoffs. Like the rest of the division, they were left far behind by the Birmingham Stallions and Tampa Bay Bandits. However, like most of the USFL's other Southern teams, they were a runaway hit at the box office. Indeed, they were one of the few teams whose crowds actually grew as the season progressed.

The Showboats broke through in 1985, finishing fourth in the East and earning a playoff berth. They should have traveled to Denver's Mile High Stadium to face the Denver Gold. However, the Gold were forced to travel to Memphis under pressure from ABC Sports. The Gold's local support had all but vanished due to the USFL's planned move to the fall, and ABC did not want the embarrassment of showing a half-empty stadium. It forced Commissioner Harry Usher to give Memphis home-field advantage in the first round, since the Showboats had been among the league's attendance leaders once again. ABC had an outsize influence on the USFL due to the structure of the league's television contract. The Showboats thrashed the Gold 48–7 before losing to the Oakland Invaders 28–19 in the semifinals.

The Showboats represented a serious attempt to form a viable professional football organization, and seemed to have a realistic chance to have been a viable business if the overall management of the USFL had been more realistic and financially sound. Indeed, like the World Football League's Memphis Southmen before them, the Showboats appeared to be on more solid footing than the league as a whole. The Showboats' attendance figures made Dunavant a supporter of the USFL's move to the fall. Although Memphis was only a medium-sized market (while Memphis proper had 650,000 people, the surrounding suburbs and rural areas are not much larger than the city itself), Dunavant believed his team's popularity would have made it very attractive to the NFL in the event of a merger. After the USFL's antitrust lawsuit failed, the Showboats threw their support behind Charlie Finley's proposal to convince the Canadian Football League to expand into the U.S. market; the CFL rejected the plan, bringing the Showboats' operations to an end.

== Legacy ==
Despite the eventual failure of the original USFL, the success of the Showboats franchise was noticed by the NFL, indicating a viable market in Tennessee. Dunavant placed a bid for a Memphis team in the NFL's 1993 expansion derby; he chose not to use the Showboats name and instead partnered with Lisa Marie Presley and the estate of her father to propose the Memphis Hound Dogs. The Hound Dogs, one of five proposed franchises, were not chosen, as the NFL went forward with the Carolina Panthers and Jacksonville Jaguars. In 1997, the Houston Oilers franchise would move to Nashville, though they played their first season in Memphis, before moving to Nashville and being renamed the Tennessee Titans in 1999.

Rodgers and general manager Steve Ehrhart would later emerge with the Memphis Mad Dogs, a Canadian Football League franchise that played one season in 1995; Ehrhart would also manage the Memphis Maniax of the original XFL in 2001.

The Memphis Showboats name was revived for the 2023 season of the USFL's second iteration.

== In popular culture ==
In the SpongeBob SquarePants Season 2 episode "Band Geeks", the band led by Squidward Tentacles plays at the "Bubble Bowl", during which clips of a Showboats game (vs. the Tampa Bay Bandits at Liberty Bowl Memorial Stadium in Memphis on May 25, 1984) are shown.

A player from the Memphis Showboats appeared as a contestant on Press Your Luck in 1985.

== Schedule and results ==
=== 1984 ===
Week	Date	Opponent	Result	Record	Venue	Attendance
Preseason
1	Bye					
2	Bye					
3	February 11	vs. San Antonio Gunslingers	L 3–13	0–1	Shreveport, Louisiana	
4	February 18	vs. New Orleans Breakers	L 0–20	0–2	Lafayette, Louisiana	
Regular season
1	February 26	Philadelphia Stars	L 9–17	0–1	Liberty Bowl Memorial Stadium	28,098
2	March 4	Chicago Blitz	W 23–13	1–1	Liberty Bowl Memorial Stadium	10,152
3	March 11	at New Orleans Breakers	L 14–37	1–2	Louisiana Superdome	45,269
4	March 17	at Birmingham Stallions	L 6–54	1–3	Legion Field	41,500
5	March 25	Denver Gold	L 24–28	1–4	Liberty Bowl Memorial Stadium	21,213
6	March 31	Jacksonville Bulls	W 27–24	2–4	Liberty Bowl Memorial Stadium	17,180
7	April 8	at New Jersey Generals	L 10–35	2–5	Giants Stadium	43,671
8	April 14	at Los Angeles Express	L 17–23 (OT)	2–6	Los Angeles Memorial Coliseum	10,049
9	April 20	at Jacksonville Bulls	L 10–12	2–7	Gator Bowl Stadium	36,256
10	April 27	Pittsburgh Maulers	W 17–7	3–7	Liberty Bowl Memorial Stadium	30,640
11	May 6	at Washington Federals	W 13–10 (OT)	4–7	RFK Stadium	4,432
12	May 11	San Antonio Gunslingers	W 38–14	5–7	Liberty Bowl Memorial Stadium	32,406
13	May 19	at Oakland Invaders	L 14–29	5–8	Oakland–Alameda County Coliseum	22,030
14	May 25	Tampa Bay Bandits	W 31–21	6–8	Liberty Bowl Memorial Stadium	27,422
15	June 1	New Orleans Breakers	W 20–17	7–8	Liberty Bowl Memorial Stadium	31,198
16	June 9	at Tampa Bay Bandits	L 24–42	7–9	Tampa Stadium	48,785
17	June 16	Birmingham Stallions	L 20–35	7–10	Liberty Bowl Memorial Stadium	50,079
18	June 25	at Houston Gamblers	L 3–37	7–11	Houston Astrodome	22,963

=== 1985 ===
Week	Date	Opponent	Result	Record	Venue	Attendance
Preaseason
1	February 2	vs. New Jersey Generals	L 3–16	0–1	Charlotte, North Carolina	11,667
2	February 9	vs. Baltimore Stars	L 9–14	0–2	Winter Haven, Florida	
3	February 16	at Jacksonville Bulls	W 13–10	1–2	Gator Bowl Stadium	
Regular season
1	February 25	at San Antonio Gunslingers	W 20–3	1–0	Alamo Stadium	10,983
2	March 5	at Jacksonville Bulls	W 24–14	2–0	Gator Bowl Stadium	40,112
3	March 9	Baltimore Stars	W 21–19	3–0	Liberty Bowl Memorial Stadium	37,466
4	March 16	at Birmingham Stallions	L 19–34	3–1	Legion Field	34,500
5	March 24	Oakland Invaders	L 19–31	3–2	Liberty Bowl Memorial Stadium	28,773
6	March 29	Tampa Bay Bandits	L 20–28	3–3	Liberty Bowl Memorial Stadium	23,952
7	April 4	at Orlando Renegades	L 17–28	3–4	Florida Citrus Bowl	21,223
8	April 14	at Baltimore Stars	W 13–10	4–4	Byrd Stadium	15,728
9	April 19	New Jersey Generals	L 18–21	4–5	Liberty Bowl Memorial Stadium	44,339
10	April 27	at Denver Gold	W 33–17	5–5	Mile High Stadium	8,207
11	May 3	Birmingham Stallions	W 38–24	6–5	Liberty Bowl Memorial Stadium	29,025
12	May 12	Houston Gamblers	W 17–15	7–5	Liberty Bowl Memorial Stadium	27,325
13	May 18	at Tampa Bay Bandits	W 38–14	8–5	Tampa Stadium	44,818
14	May 25	at Portland Breakers	L 14–17	8–6	Civic Stadium	16,682
15	June 1	at New Jersey Generals	L 7–17	8–7	Giants Stadium	45,682
16	June 7	Orlando Renegades	W 41–17	9–7	Liberty Bowl Memorial Stadium	23,216
17	June 15	Jacksonville Bulls	W 31–0	10–7	Liberty Bowl Memorial Stadium	31,634
18	June 22	Arizona Outlaws	W 38–28	11–7	Liberty Bowl Memorial Stadium	32,743
Playoffs
Quarterfinals	June 30	Denver Gold	W 48–7	1–0	Liberty Bowl Memorial Stadium	34,528
Semifinals	July 6	Oakland Invaders	L 19–28	1–1	Liberty Bowl Memorial Stadium	37,796

== Single season leaders ==
- Rushing Yards: 789 (1985), Tim Spencer
- Receiving Yards: 1143 (1985), Greg Moser
- Passing Yards: 2128 (1985), Mike Kelley

== Season-by-season ==
Season records
Season	W	L	T	Finish	Playoff results
1984	7	11	0	4th Southern Division	--
1985	11	7	0	3rd Eastern Conference	Won Quarterfinal (Denver); Lost Semifinal (Oakland)
Totals	19	19	0	(including playoffs)	
