= Jacksonville Bulls =

Football team

- Established 1983; Folded 1986; Played in Gator Bowl in Jacksonville, Florida

League/conference affiliations
- United States Football League (1984–1985): Eastern Conference (1984–1985); Southern Division (1984)
- Current uniform
- Team colors: Garnet, Orange, Silver, Black, White

Personnel
- Owner(s): 1984–1985 Fred Bullard
- Head coach: 1984–1985 Lindy Infante (15-21)

Team history
- Jacksonville Bulls (1984–1985)

Championships
- League championships (0)
- Conference championships (0)
- Division championships (0)

Home stadium(s)
- Gator Bowl (1984–1985)

The Jacksonville Bulls were a professional American football team based in Jacksonville, Florida. They were members of the United States Football League (USFL) during its final two seasons, 1984 and 1985. They played their home games in the Gator Bowl in Jacksonville.

Former Miami Dolphins stars Larry Csonka and Jim Kiick were involved in an advertising campaign for the team, and they apparently had a minor ownership interest as well. Larry Munson was hired as radio play-by-play announcer. His distinctive voice was already well known in the Jacksonville area due to his long association with both the University of Georgia Bulldogs and the National Football League's Atlanta Falcons.

== Team name and colors ==
The Bulls' name was taken from team owner Fred "Bubba" Bullard, a Jacksonville land developer. Bullard had initially sought to buy a stake in the Boston Breakers and move them to Jacksonville when it became apparent the Breakers could not find a suitable venue in Boston. However, Breakers owner George Matthews broke off talks when Bullard insisted that coach Dick Coury be fired in favor of Florida State Seminoles coach Bobby Bowden.

The team held a 'name the team' promotion with a write-in campaign for publicity purposes. The Bulls moniker was credited as a submission from the winning entry. The team colors of garnet, orange and silver were taken from the three college football teams most popular in the area; garnet from the Seminoles, orange from the Florida Gators, and silver from the pants worn by the Georgia Bulldogs.

The helmet design was unique for a professional football team. Each side had the team's logo of a streaking bull (one side the mirror image of the other); the two logos were bridged by a series of parallel lines, and the team name was incorporated into the bridge as a silhouette against the parallel lines.

== 1984 season ==
The Bulls made an immediate splash in their first game, in which they blew out the Washington Federals 53–14. Although they finished 6–12 — last in the tough Southern Division — they were far more competitive than their record indicated. Six of their losses were by a touchdown or less, including two losses by a last-second field goal. They remained in contention for most of the season, but a six-game losing streak toward the end of the season kept them out of the playoffs.

The Bulls were an undisputed success at the gate, running away with the league's attendance title. They notched the only two crowds of 70,000 or greater in league history, including a throng of 73,227 against the powerful New Jersey Generals on March 4. In the last game, against the Pittsburgh Maulers, a huge crowd patiently waited through a late-June downpour which postponed the game for more than an hour. When play finally started the Bulls won 26–2.

=== 1984 schedule and results ===
Week	Date	Opponent	Result	Record	Venue	Attendance
Preseason
1	January 28	Pittsburgh Maulers	T 0–0	0–0–1	Gator Bowl Stadium	10,000
2	Bye					
3	February 11	Houston Gamblers	L 22–34	0–1–1	Gator Bowl Stadium	24,680
4	February 18	vs. Pittsburgh Maulers	L 10–13	0–2–1	Melbourne, Florida	4,500
Regular Season
1	February 26	Washington Federals	W 53–14	1–0	Gator Bowl Stadium	49,392
2	March 4	New Jersey Generals	L 26–28	1–1	Gator Bowl Stadium	73,227
3	March 10	at Tampa Bay Bandits	L 25–28	1–2	Tampa Stadium	51,274
4	March 19	New Orleans Breakers	L 9–28	1–3	Gator Bowl Stadium	48,303
5	March 25	at Los Angeles Express	W 13–7	2–3	Los Angeles Memorial Coliseum	8,000
6	March 31	at Memphis Showboats	L 24–27	2–4	Liberty Bowl Memorial Stadium	17,180
7	April 7	Birmingham Stallions	L 17–24	2–5	Gator Bowl Stadium	43,654
8	April 14	San Antonio Gunslingers	L 0–20	2–6	Gator Bowl Stadium	35,084
9	April 20	Memphis Showboats	W 12–10	3–6	Gator Bowl Stadium	36,256
10	April 27	at Oklahoma Outlaws	W 34–6	4–6	Skelly Stadium	29,234
11	May 5	Tampa Bay Bandits	L 13–31	4–7	Gator Bowl Stadium	71,174
12	May 11	at Birmingham Stallions	L 10–42	4–8	Legion Field	29,500
13	May 19	at Philadelphia Stars	L 12–45	4–9	Veterans Stadium	33,194
14	May 25	Houston Gamblers	L 7–54	4–10	Gator Bowl Stadium	31,638
15	June 2	at Oakland Invaders	L 12–17	4–11	Oakland–Alameda County Coliseum	29,687
16	June 8	at Arizona Wranglers	L 14–45	4–12	Sun Devil Stadium	15,513
17	June 15	at New Orleans Breakers	W 20–17	5–12	Louisiana Superdome	21,333
18	June 22	Pittsburgh Maulers	W 26–2	6–12	Gator Bowl Stadium	31,843

=== 1984 roster ===
1. Danny Miller (K)

2. Rich Hendley (P)

3. Brian Franco (K/P)

5. Jeff Brockhaus (K)

8. Jeff Pierce (P)

9. Ken Hobart (QB)

14. Ben Bennett (QB)

14. Ron Rice (P)

15. Robbie Mahfouz (QB)

16. Buck Belue (QB)

17. Matt Robinson (QB)

20. Billy Cesare (SS)

21. Willie McClendon (RB)

22. Kevin Gray (CB)

23. Kerry Baird (CB)

23. Donald Dykes (CB)

24. Marvin Lewis (FB)

25. Charlie Dean (CB)

26. Chester Gee (CB)

27. Michael Whiting (RB)

28. Matt Courtney (CB)

32. Larry Mason (RB)

33. Vaughan Johnson (LB)

35. John Lott (FS)

44. Larry Key (RB)

44. Bobby Hosea (FS)

45. Mike Goedeker (LB)

46. Don Bessillieu (FS)

47. Sammy Brown (SS)

50. John McLean (LB)

51. Dave Otey (C)

52. Tom Dinkel (LB)

53. Fernando Jackson (LB)

55. Carl Qualls (LB)

55. Dann Lute (LB)

56. Rufus Norman (LB)

56. Doug West (LB)

57. Greg Zappala (LB)

58. Andy Hendel (LB)

59. Russ Washington (LB)

60. Gary Anderson (G/C)

63. Nat Hudson (T)

64. Kenny Howell (G)

65. Wally Pesuit (C)

66. George Collins (G)

67. Warren Gray (G)

69. Rush Brown (DE)

70. Val Brown (DE)

72. Don Latimer (NT)

73. Ed Gantner (DT)

75. Bob Gruber (T)

77. Chris Wampler (NT)

78. Brian Douglas (NT)

80. Gary Clark (WR)

82. Wyatt Henderson (WR)

83. Aubrey Matthews (WR)

84. Paul Bergmann (TE)

85. Perry Kemp (WR)

87. Chuck McCurley (WR)

88. Robert Young (TE)

89. Alton Alexis (WR)

91. Phil Dokes (DE)

92. George Atiyeh (NT)

92. Marvin Dyett (DE)

95. Mike Raines (DE)

97. Charles Philyaw (DE)

98. Bob Clasby (DE)

99. Joe Costello (DE)

--. Amos Lawrence (RB)

--. Dan Gooch (LB)

Charles R. Hunsicker Jr. – Team Chaplain

== Offseason ==
The offseason saw the addition of former NFL MVP QB Brian Sipe to take over as triggerman of Coach Lindy Infante's high octane passing scheme as well as former Heisman Trophy winning HB Mike Rozier.

== 1985 season ==
While Sipe only threw 89 passes before suffering a career-ending injury, an improved defense and the addition of Rozier resulted in a 9–9 record. The Bulls finished one win short of a playoff spot and led the league in attendance again.

=== 1985 schedule and results ===
Week	Date	Opponent	Result	Record	Venue	Attendance
Preseason
1	Bye					
2	February 9	Orlando Renegades	L 10–20	0–1	Gator Bowl Stadium	
3	February 16	Memphis Showboats	L 10–13	0–2	Gator Bowl Stadium	
Regular Season
1	February 24	Baltimore Stars	W 22–14	1–0	Gator Bowl Stadium	51,045
2	March 4	Memphis Showboats	L 14–24	1–1	Gator Bowl Stadium	40,112
3	March 11	at Arizona Outlaws	L 21–41	1–2	Sun Devil Stadium	13,025
4	March 17	at Oakland Invaders	L 36–42	1–3	Oakland–Alameda County Coliseum	16,678
5	March 21	Orlando Renegades	W 34–31 (OT)	2–3	Gator Bowl Stadium	31,883
6	March 30	at Birmingham Stallions	L 18–25	2–4	Legion Field	41,200
7	April 6	at Tampa Bay Bandits	L 17–31	2–5	Tampa Stadium	51,286
8	April 12	San Antonio Gunslingers	W 28–17	3–5	Gator Bowl Stadium	32,097
9	April 20	at Orlando Renegades	W 31–10	4–5	Florida Citrus Bowl	34,338
10	April 28	Birmingham Stallions	W 27–17	5–5	Gator Bowl Stadium	41,298
11	May 5	New Jersey Generals	W 30–20	6–5	Gator Bowl Stadium	60,100
12	May 12	Tampa Bay Bandits	L 10–21	6–6	Gator Bowl Stadium	58,928
13	May 20	at Houston Gamblers	W 20–17	7–6	Houston Astrodome	17,127
14	May 25	Los Angeles Express	W 21–7	8–6	Gator Bowl Stadium	51,033
15	June 2	at Baltimore Stars	L 12–17	8–7	Byrd Stadium	9,663
16	June 10	at New Jersey Generals	L 24–31	8–8	Giants Stadium	36,465
17	June 15	at Memphis Showboats	L 0–31	8–9	Liberty Bowl Memorial Stadium	31,634
18	June 23	Denver Gold	W 42–6	9–9	Gator Bowl Stadium	32,428

== Demise ==
The Bulls were one of the seven teams assured of playing the 1986 USFL season, which would have been played in the autumn. The Bulls had bought the football assets of the Denver Gold during the offseason and were to take on much of that team's staff, including head coach Mouse Davis. It also attempted to negotiate a merger with the Tampa Bay Bandits, mainly to bring the Bandits' ownership group into the organization, but the eventual deaths of the two leading investors in the Bandits (and their steadfast refusal to go along with the league's plan to move to the autumn in 1986) and the unwillingness of the Orlando Renegades to join in (which would have created a single franchise representing all of Florida) led to those plans being abandoned.

The USFL itself was pursuing a large antitrust lawsuit against the NFL at the time; when they failed to secure a sizable judgment against the older league, the USFL suspended operations and eventually folded.

== Legacy ==
Despite never posting a winning record, the Bulls were considered to be a serious attempt at a viable professional football organization — indeed, one of the few USFL teams with the potential to be viable had the league been better run. Owner Fred Bullard was determined from the beginning to put together a strong organization on and off the field. Many experts believe that had it not been for the Bulls' success, the NFL would not have considered awarding the Jacksonville Jaguars to the city in 1993. In 1987 the Houston Oilers nearly moved to Jacksonville, in part due to the overwhelming support for the Bulls. The nearby Matthews Bridge was painted in the garnet main color as a backdrop for the games.

== Season-by-season results ==
Season records
Season	W	L	T	Finish	Playoff results
1984	6	12	0	5th EC Southern	--
1985	9	9	0	6th EC	--
Totals	15	21	0		
