= Los Angeles Express (USFL) =

Football team

General information
- Founded: 1982
- Folded: 1985
- Headquartered: Los Angeles Memorial Coliseum in Los Angeles, California
- Colors: Express blue, silver, burgundy, white

Personnel
- Owners: 1983 Alan Harmon & Bill Daniels; 1984 J. William Oldenburg; 1985 USFL
- Head coach: 1983 Hugh Campbell (8–10); 1984–1985 John Hadl (14–24)

Team history
- Los Angeles Express (1983–1985)

Home fields
- Los Angeles Memorial Coliseum (1983–1985)

League / conference affiliations
- United States Football League (1983–1985): Western Conference (1984–1985); Pacific Division (1983–1984)

Championships
- Division championships: 1; 1984

Playoff appearances (1)
- 1984

The Los Angeles Express was a team in the United States Football League (USFL) based in Los Angeles, California. Playing at the Los Angeles Memorial Coliseum, the Express competed in all three of the USFL seasons played between 1983 and 1985.

== History ==
Cable television pioneers Alan Harmon and Bill Daniels were awarded a USFL franchise for San Diego when the league announced its formation in 1982. However, the city refused to grant the team a lease to play at Jack Murphy Stadium under pressure from the stadium's existing tenants—baseball's Padres, the NFL's Chargers, and the NASL's Sockers. The only other outdoor facility available in the area was Balboa Stadium, the original home of the Chargers. However, it was a relatively antiquated facility (built in 1915) that had not had a major tenant since the Chargers moved into Jack Murphy in 1967, and was now largely used by high school teams. This was an untenable situation for a team that was aspiring to be part of a major sports league.

With only eight months before the season was to start, Harmon and Daniels decided to move to Los Angeles with the league's blessing. League officials believed that Harmon and Daniels' ties to the cable industry could help the league get exposure; David Dixon's blueprint for the league depended heavily on television coverage. They forced Jim Joseph, second owner of the Los Angeles USFL franchise, to give up his rights to Los Angeles in favor of Harmon and Daniels. Joseph relocated his franchise to Phoenix, Arizona as the Arizona Wranglers.

=== 1983 season ===
The Los Angeles Express drafted Dan Marino as the first pick in USFL history. Marino made some appearances on behalf of the Express before signing with the Miami Dolphins.

The Express also made a serious run at Eric Dickerson, and actually matched the Los Angeles Rams' offer for him. However, Dickerson signed with the Rams, apparently because family members were skeptical about the USFL.

Television star Lee Majors became part owner in April 1983.

The Express ownership lured Canadian Football League legend Hugh Campbell, head coach of the Edmonton Eskimos, to be their first head coach. (Campbell had taken over the Eskimos in 1977 and in his six years had taken the team to six straight Grey Cup games, winning the last five.)

The 1983 Express team was a competitive team headed by quarterbacks Tom Ramsey and Mike Rae and led by an above average defense. Despite losing two defensive backs to knee injuries, the Express finished fifth in the league in total defense.

However, a patchwork offensive line limited the team's offensive firepower. The Express had the worst rushing attack in the league. Herschel Walker rushed for 72 more yards than the entire Express team in 1983. Despite this, the Pacific Division was so weak that the Express were actually in contention for the division title with two weeks to go in the season. However, upset losses to the New Jersey Generals and Washington Federals in weeks 16 and 17 respectively cost the Express the Pacific Division title and allowed the Oakland Invaders to claim the last 1983 playoff berth.

Southern Californians viewed the Express largely with indifference. They only drew 19,000 people per game, failing to top 17,000 in their last four games. The crowds looked even smaller than that due to the cavernous size of the Coliseum, which seated almost 95,000 people at the time, far and away the largest stadium in pro football. However, it was far too big for an NFL team (the Los Angeles Raiders, and the Rams before them, were plagued with local blackouts even in their best years), let alone a USFL team. It was so spread out that even crowds of 25,000 —a decent-sized crowd by USFL standards— were swallowed up in the environment.

While Harmon and Daniels knew that the Express were going to be a hard sell, the poor gate surprised even them. Additionally, television ratings for USFL games in the Los Angeles market were so low that they significantly held down the league's average television ratings.

=== 1984 season ===
Harmon and Daniels grew alarmed at their fellow owners' increasingly reckless spending. They had also tired of commuting from their base in Denver to Los Angeles for games. They put the Express up for sale, and found a buyer in mortgage banker J. William Oldenburg, who bought the team for $7.5 million. Soon after taking over, Oldenburg hired veteran NFL executive Don Klosterman as general manager and former Chargers and Los Angeles Rams quarterback John Hadl as head coach.

Oldenburg told Klosterman that money was no object, and he was to sign the best 40-man roster he could find. As Klosterman put it, Oldenburg wanted to "design a car to go 180 miles an hour." Klosterman signed 31 players in two months for a total of $12 million. Among other things, he spent a total of $8 million to sign four of the best offensive linemen in college football, giving the Express the most expensive offensive line in all of professional football. One of the new signees, kicker Tony Zendejas, recalled being stunned at the number of luxury cars in the players' parking lot.

Klosterman and Oldenburg's biggest prize was Steve Young, a quarterback who had played at the namesake university of his lineal ancestor, Brigham Young University. Agent Leigh Steinberg negotiated for Young what was then reported to be the largest professional sports contract ever signed – a 10-year deal worth over US$40 million. The payments were to be in the form of an annuity set up to pay him $1 million annually for the next 42 years, so the value of the contract was considerably less than stated.

The NFL also noticed the Express' stockpiling of talent: in the 1984 NFL Supplemental Draft of USFL and CFL players, no fewer than twenty Express players were picked, including four of the first six selections and eleven in just the opening round. But despite the all-star lineup, the team struggled to compete with the popularity of the Raiders (who had just won the Super Bowl) and the Rams: the Express only drew 15,361 people per game, down from 19,713 a year earlier. On three occasions, the team drew crowds of fewer than 11,000 people. Largely due to the poor attendance, they reportedly lost $15 million.

In spite of its overwhelming talent and one of the league's highest payrolls, the young team struggled with adjusting to the pro game and several injuries, losing their first four home games and only finishing two games over .500 at 10–8; however, this was enough to tie the Wranglers for first place in the Pacific Division. The Express won the division title on a tiebreaker, and got to play the Michigan Panthers, who had limped into the playoffs with a 4–8 record in their last 12 games since losing star wide receiver Anthony Carter for the season, while Arizona got Jim Kelly's red hot 13–5 Houston Gamblers. The playoff game against the Panthers drew only 7,964 fans, which looked tiny in the huge Coliseum. As it turned out, the contest was the longest in professional football history: a three-overtime, 93 minute and 33 second marathon won by the Express 27–21 on a touchdown run by Mel Gray. (This proved painful for both teams: Gray broke his arm on the play, and the Panthers never played again, merging over the winter with the Oakland Invaders.)

The Wranglers upset the Gamblers 17–16 on a late rally, which normally would have given the Express the right to host the conference championship game against the Wranglers. But since the Coliseum was being readied for the 1984 Summer Olympics, the game was shifted to the Wranglers' home, Sun Devil Stadium in Tempe, Arizona. However, moving the game created another problem: with daytime temperatures in Arizona well above 100 degrees on that July day, local doctors and other officials implored the league to move the contest to nighttime, which they did. Unfortunately, this meant the game would be aired starting at 11:30pm on the east coast, which didn't exactly help TV ratings (and, even after sundown, temps were still in the nineties at game time). League officials were nonetheless relieved when the game attracted a solid crowd of 33,188, which would have looked extremely sparse in the Coliseum. (Arizona won, 35–23, and advanced to the USFL title game, which they lost to Philadelphia.)

==== 1984 schedule and results ====
Week	Date	Opponent	Result	Record	Venue	Attendance
Preseason
1	Bye					
2	Bye					
3	February 11	vs. Birmingham Stallions	L 0–10	0–1	Tempe, Arizona	
4	Bye					
Regular Season
1	February 26	Denver Gold	L 10–27	0–1	Los Angeles Memorial Coliseum	32,082
2	March 4	Birmingham Stallions	L 14–21	0–2	Los Angeles Memorial Coliseum	14,789
3	March 11	at Oakland Invaders	W 10–0	1–2	Oakland-Alameda County Coliseum	23,479
4	March 17	at San Antonio Gunslingers	W 13–12	2–2	Alamo Stadium	9,821
5	March 25	Jacksonville Bulls	L 7–13	2–3	Los Angeles Memorial Coliseum	8,000
6	April 1	New Jersey Generals	L 10–26	2–4	Los Angeles Memorial Coliseum	19,853
7	April 9	at Denver Gold	L 27–35	2–5	Mile High Stadium	19,115
8	April 14	Memphis Showboats	W 23–17 (OT)	3–5	Los Angeles Memorial Coliseum	10,049
9	April 20	at Chicago Blitz	L 29–49	3–6	Soldier Field	11,713
10	April 30	at Houston Gamblers	W 27–24 (OT)	4–6	Houston Astrodome	30,727
11	May 5	Pittsburgh Maulers	W 20–12	5–6	Los Angeles Memorial Coliseum	16,789
12	May 13	at Philadelphia Stars	L 14–18	5–7	Veterans Stadium	22,391
13	May 20	Michigan Panthers	W 14–17	6–7	Los Angeles Memorial Coliseum	10,193
14	May 26	Arizona Wranglers	W 24–17	7–7	Los Angeles Memorial Coliseum	11,702
15	June 3	at Washington Federals	W 35–21	8–7	RFK Stadium	5,263
16	June 10	at Oklahoma Outlaws	W 17–10	9–7	Skelly Stadium	22,017
17	June 15	Oakland Invaders	W 24–19	10–7	Los Angeles Memorial Coliseum	14,794
18	June 23	at Arizona Wranglers	L 10–35	10–8	Sun Devil Stadium	35,258
Playoffs
Divisional Playoff	June 30	Michigan Panthers	W 27–21 (3OT)	1–0	Los Angeles Memorial Coliseum	7,964
Conference Championship	July 7	at Arizona Wranglers	L 25–35	1–1	Sun Devil Stadium	33,188

=== Offseason disaster ===
Then, just as quickly as the Express rose, they fell. Midway through the season, the FBI began investigating Oldenburg's financial dealings. Multiple exposés by The Wall Street Journal and The New York Times revealed Oldenburg not only had a habit of luring savings and loans into questionable deals, but was also nowhere near as well off as he had long claimed.

In its bid to gain credibility with the sporting public, the USFL stressed that it required potential owners to undergo an exhaustive due diligence and meet strict capitalization requirements. However, it emerged that the owners largely dispensed with these procedures while reviewing Oldenburg's application. The league was desperate to ensure an apparently solid owner in the nation's second-largest market. With Oldenburg as the only credible bidder for the Express after Harmon and Daniels pulled out, the league only conducted a cursory review of his finances. While Oldenburg had gained a reputation as the enfant terrible of the league, no one even suspected that he was a fraud until the FBI and newspaper investigations revealed that he had virtually no money. When he applied to buy the Express, he claimed to have net worth of $100 million, which on paper would have given him more than enough net worth to buy the team. Subsequent investigations suggested that much of that figure came from buying a piece of property for a discount, then selling it to a small bank that he owned for ten times its actual worth.

Late in the season, just days after the Times article, Oldenburg told league officials that he could no longer afford to pay the Express' bills. The league required all owners to post a $1.3 million letter of credit for just such an emergency; it tapped into the Express' letter of credit to cover expenses. The owners also agreed to chip in $500,000 to keep the team going through the playoffs. Even this wasn't enough to prevent their equipment from being confiscated after the Western Conference title game because Oldenburg had failed to pay an equipment company $13,000. By the time that Oldenburg walked away from the team, office employees and landscaping contractors were going unpaid.

Real estate magnate and Houston Gamblers minority owner Jay Roulier got preliminary approval to take over the team in October. Despite this, the turmoil surrounding the Express led league insiders and reporters to wonder when, not if, the team would implode, even with the trove of talent on the roster. The expected implosion happened in February 1985, when Roulier's lawyer sounded wary about discussing her boss's finances with league executive director and general counsel Bill McSherry. Suspecting that Roulier was less than advertised, league officials launched an investigation. It turned out that Roulier, like Oldenburg, had deceived league officials about his net worth. He had so little money that was using the remaining funds in the team's league-controlled checking account to send the team to training camp. In short order, league officials pushed Roulier out and took control of the team.

The league could not fold the team because of a clause in its television contract with ABC Sports requiring the league to have teams in the nation's three largest markets. While ABC had not concerned itself with the demise of the Chicago Blitz after the 1984 season, the league's owners feared that ABC would pull its contract if the Express were shut down—an action that would have probably killed the league. Unfortunately, potential buyers were scared off by the prospect of having to assume the burden of the Express' massive payroll.

Under the circumstances, the other owners had no option but to operate the Express as a ward of the league for the 1985 season. McSherry became nominal team president. The owners were required to contribute $500,000 apiece to fund the Express–enough to meet payroll, but little else. Notably, no money was allocated for replacing injured players.

=== 1985 season ===
The league found itself operating a team for the second year in a row; it had been forced to take over the Blitz after new owner James Hoffman walked away from the team during training camp. However, as bad as the situation with the Blitz had been for the league in 1984, the Express were even worse in 1985. Not only did the Express' roster costs dwarf Chicago's due to the large contracts, but the league had contracted in the off-season and there were only 13 other teams to contribute to supporting the Express.

In what proved to be a harbinger of things to come, the team was evicted from its hotel during training camp after the bill went unpaid. The players were forced to room with each other for the remainder of camp. They also went without water for much of camp after a $136 bill went unpaid. A bank won an attachment on the franchise as part of a lawsuit against Oldenburg after he defaulted on a loan. However, the attachment was withdrawn when bank officials learned they would be responsible for $1.3 million in player salaries that week.

After three close losses to start the season, including the season-opening game against the Houston Gamblers nicknamed "The Greatest Game No One Saw" after the Express surrendered a 20-point lead to the Gamblers to lose 34–33, they went 3–5 in their next eight games. Just when it looked like the season could be salvaged, the injury bug bit the team hard, decimating the roster. Young was among the more prominent casualties. At that point, the season turned into a complete fiasco, and the Express would not win another game. The nine-game losing streak was the second-longest in league history, behind only the Wranglers' 10-game losing streak in 1983. One of those games was a 51–0 thrashing by the Denver Gold—the largest margin of defeat in league history.

The Express' on-field collapse was all the more stunning since this was essentially the same team that had gone all the way to the Western Conference title game a year earlier. However, the rash of injuries made a shambles of the depth chart. At one point late in the season, the team was so short of healthy offensive linemen that one player had to back up the entire starting line. Even without this to consider, the young Express players suspected that the team wouldn't be around for the planned move to the fall in 1986, even if the league managed to survive the 1985 season. With this in mind, they played tentatively, fearing injuries that might diminish their future NFL prospects.

With no money to replace injured players, Klosterman and Hadl had to resort to creative measures to field a team. In one game, they signed a 39-year-old truck driver to start at tackle. For the season finale against Orlando, Young had to line up at running back for most of the second half because the Express didn't have any healthy running backs.

If possible, the off-field situation was even worse. No money was allocated to pay office bills or buy tape for players' ankles. They went for much of the offseason without postage, and had to talk a local company into processing season ticket renewals through their postage meter. The lights and phones were sometimes turned off. They were forced to fire the cheerleaders in a cost-cutting move. Late in the season, there wasn't even a public address announcer.

Even as the team's infrastructure fell apart, the players still got paid, thus avoiding a repeat of situations in Portland, Arizona, Houston and San Antonio. In a bizarre scene, the players rolled into team headquarters in Manhattan Beach in luxury cars and toting Gucci bags, but the grass on the practice fields went uncut for much of the season because the landscapers hadn't been paid.

Attendance continued to plummet; the club drew just 67,533 fans for their eight dates at the Coliseum combined – well short of the stadium's capacity for even a single game – or 8,442 per contest. League commissioner Harry Usher was under fire to find an owner and fix the Express' problem. Desperate for a solution, Usher had the team try a smaller stadium for its final home game: John Shephard Stadium on the campus of Los Angeles Pierce College, a junior college in the San Fernando Valley. The stadium, which had already hosted an Express preseason game in February, increased its capacity to 16,000 for the contest. Usher and the league owners hoped if the game did well they might have some ammunition to land a potential owner.

That game almost didn't occur when the team's bus driver refused to take them to Pierce College without being paid up front, in cash. Young passed a hat around, but no one was willing to chip in. Finally, the trainer offered to cash his check, and the driver took them to the game. However, the contest was still not a sellout; only 8,200 people (barely half of the stadium's capacity, and actually less than their average in the Coliseum) saw Young and the Express lose 21–10 to Doug Williams and the Outlaws. The playing conditions left much to be desired; the field was strewn with rocks and potholes, and some areas were merely painted dirt. The scoreboard was positioned at an angle that made it useless once the sun began setting. While the game drew double what the Express had drawn for their previous two home games at the Coliseum, the experiment was so embarrassing that Usher nearly lost his job.

A week later, they lost to the Renegades, 17–10; as mentioned above, Young had to play part of the game at running back. They were almost stranded in Orlando when the pilot of their charter plane insisted on being paid in advance before allowing the players to board. The team's final record was 3–15, last in the league.

==== 1985 schedule and results ====
Week	Date	Opponent	Result	Record	Venue	Attendance
Preseason
1	February 2	vs. Denver Gold	T 17–17	0–0–1	Long Beach, California	
2	Bye					
3	February 16	vs. Portland Breakers	W 38–17	1–0–1	John Shepard Stadium; Los Angeles Pierce College; Los Angeles, California	5,500
Regular Season
1	February 24	Houston Gamblers	L 33–34	0–1	Los Angeles Memorial Coliseum	18,828
2	March 2	at Portland Breakers	L 10–14	0–2	Civic Stadium	25,232
3	March 10	at New Jersey Generals	L 24–35	0–3	Giants Stadium	58,741
4	March 16	San Antonio Gunslingers	W 38–7	1–3	Los Angeles Memorial Coliseum	10,410
5	March 23	at Arizona Outlaws	L 13–27	1–4	Sun Devil Stadium	20,835
6	March 31	Oakland Invaders	L 6–30	1–5	Los Angeles Memorial Coliseum	11,619
7	April 7	Baltimore Stars	L 6–17	1–6	Los Angeles Memorial Coliseum	5,637
8	April 14	at Houston Gamblers	W 18–17 (OT)	2–6	Houston Astrodome	20,193
9	April 21	at Denver Gold	L 0–51	2–7	Mile High Stadium	13,165
10	April 27	Portland Breakers	W 17–12	3–7	Los Angeles Memorial Coliseum	8,410
11	May 4	Tampa Bay Bandits	L 14–24	3–8	Los Angeles Memorial Coliseum	4,912
12	May 11	at Oakland Invaders	L 6–27	3–9	Oakland-Alameda County Coliseum	12,482
13	May 19	Birmingham Stallions	L 7–44	3–10	Los Angeles Memorial Coliseum	4,658
14	May 25	at Jacksonville Bulls	L 7–21	3–11	Gator Bowl Stadium	51,033
15	May 30	Denver Gold	L 20–27	3–12	Los Angeles Memorial Coliseum	3,059
16	June 9	at San Antonio Gunslingers	L 27–31	3–13	Alamo Stadium	4,963
17	June 15	Arizona Outlaws	L 10–21	3–14	John Shepard Stadium, Los Angeles Pierce College; Los Angeles, California	8,200
18	June 21	at Orlando Renegades	L 10–17	3–15	Florida Citrus Bowl	22,865

=== Demise of the franchise and the league ===
Unable to find a new owner for the Express, the USFL announced the team would suspend operations for the 1986 season. However, many of the very issues that plagued the Express in 1985 made it very likely the team would not have returned even if the league had succeeded in winning a large payoff from the NFL to finance a move to a fall schedule in 1986. Additionally, the Express would have had to compete against two NFL teams and, if they had returned to the Coliseum, would have had to share their home with one of them (the Raiders) and the University of Southern California's team. In the end, the USFL cancelled its 1986 season, never to return.

== Aftermath ==
After trying all season in 1985, Steve Young and Gary Zimmerman were finally able to buy their way out of the USFL. Both went on to Hall of Fame careers in the NFL.

The "Los Angeles Express" name was briefly revived in 2013 for a proposed A-11 Football League team, but those plans fell through in April 2014 due to California's workers compensation situation.

== Single-season leaders ==
- Rushing yards: 830 (1984), Kevin Nelson
- Receiving yards: 889 (1984), Jojo Townsell
- Passing yards: 2361 (1984), Steve Young

== Season-by-season ==
Season records
Season	W	L	T	Finish	Playoff results
1983	8	10	0	2nd Pacific	–
1984	10	8	0	1st WC Pacific	Won quarterfinal (Michigan); Lost Semifinal (Arizona)
1985	3	15	0	7th WC	–
Totals	22	34	0	(including playoffs)	
