= Oklahoma / Arizona Outlaws =

American football team in the USFL

Logo

General information
- Founded: 1983
- Folded: 1986
- Headquartered: Sun Devil Stadium in Tempe, Arizona
- Colors: Black, red, white (1984 – as Oklahoma Outlaws) Black, Red, Copper, White (1985 – as Arizona Outlaws)

Personnel
- Owner: 1984–1986 William R. Tatham Sr.
- Head coach: 1984 Woody Widenhofer (6–12); 1985 Frank Kush (8–10)

Team history
- Oklahoma Outlaws (1984); Arizona Outlaws (1985)

Home fields
- Skelly Stadium (1984); Sun Devil Stadium (1985)

League / conference affiliations
- United States Football League (1984–1985): Western Conference (1984–1985); Central Division (1984)

The Oklahoma Outlaws / Arizona Outlaws were a professional American football team that played in the United States Football League in the mid-1980s. They were owned by Fresno banker and real estate magnate William Tatham Sr., who had briefly owned the Portland Thunder (WFL) of the World Football League.

During their first season, the team played as the Oklahoma Outlaws. They became the Arizona Outlaws for their second season.

== History ==
=== 1984 Oklahoma Outlaws ===
The Outlaws were originally slated to play in San Diego. However, under pressure from baseball's Padres, the NFL's Chargers and the NASL's Sockers, the city refused to grant Tatham a lease for Jack Murphy Stadium. Scrambling for a home, Tatham seriously considered playing in Honolulu for its inaugural 1984 season. However, he settled on Tulsa, Oklahoma—even though the city had not even been included in a list of possible expansion sites for the USFL.

Tatham was initially skeptical about basing a team in Tulsa. It was only the 60th-largest television market, which would have made it by far the smallest market in the league. Moreover, the only viable facility, the University of Tulsa's Skelly Stadium, needed major renovations in order to bring it to something approaching professional standards.

However, Tatham had roots in Oklahoma, and eventually concluded that putting his team there would give something back to the state. He christened his team the Oklahoma Outlaws. The club was the second major-league sports team to play in the state, after the North American Soccer League's Tulsa Roughnecks.

On July 7, 1983, at the same time the USFL announced the expansion team, Tatham introduced Hall of Fame member Sid Gillman, who came out of retirement at age 71 to serve as the Director of Operations. Gillman signed a roster of players, but was fired by Tatham in December in a dispute over finances.

In what proved to be a harbinger of things to come, Tatham and his son, Bill Jr.–who was tapped as general manager despite being fresh out of law school–discovered soon after the ink dried on his lease with TU that school officials had vastly inflated attendance figures for Tulsa Golden Hurricane football games in hopes of maintaining their Division I-A status. The Tathams had been led to believe that the Hurricane drew 35,000–40,000 people per game, which would have been more than respectable by USFL standards. However, business manager Bill Wall, TU's former athletic director, told them after the season opener that the Hurricane actually drew 17,000 per game.

Fortunately for the Tathams, they had a lifeline in Gillman's highest-profile signing, former Tampa Bay Buccaneers quarterback Doug Williams, who bolted to the upstart league when the Bucs rejected his offer for a significant pay raise out of hand. Years later, Williams said that he was won over when the Tathams "treated me like a human," rather than "a piece of cattle in a stockyard." They signed him to a $3 million contract, along with a $1 million signing bonus, which made him easily one of the highest-paid players in either league. By comparison, while with the Bucs, he made less than several backups, and their offer for 1984 would have still made him one of the lowest-paid starters in the league. Williams was not a very refined, efficient, or consistent passer at that point in addition to being a little rusty, but had a big arm and a knack for making plays.

Along with Williams, the Outlaws roster included rookie Oklahoma State star RB Ernest Anderson. Former Pittsburgh Steelers defensive coordinator Woody Widenhofer coached the team. A young out-of-work oil worker, defensive end and part-time musician named Toby Covel played during the Outlaws' preseason but failed to make the team and played that season with the Oklahoma City Drillers, an unofficial farm team; under his middle name Toby Keith, he eventually emerged as a major country music star.

The team only drew 15,937 to their first game, a home opener versus the expansion Pittsburgh Maulers on a rainy and cold spring day. (Home openers in the USFL for most teams were the highest attendance games of the season.) Two weeks into the season, Bill Jr. announced that Skelly Stadium was inadequate for the Outlaws' needs and that they would be playing elsewhere in 1985.

The Outlaws were competitive for much of the first half of the season, starting out 6–2 off the strength of Williams' arm. Unfortunately, the team could not consistently run the ball. (The Outlaws finished with a league worst total of 1537 total rushing yards --- almost 200 yards less than the 17th ranked team.) Two blowout losses sent the team into a downward spiral. They did not win another game that season, dropping 10 straight to finish 6–12.

In spite of those factors, the Outlaws averaged 21,038 fans (in a 40,000-seat stadium), 14th in the league. It might have been even higher if not for brutally cold and wet early-season weather and what amounted to season-long lame duck status. While Tulsa as a USFL host city had a number of legitimate problems, fan turnout was surprisingly respectable, especially compared to the unsustainable attendance numbers seen by USFL teams in Chicago (7,455), Washington (7,694) and Los Angeles (15,361). They were also one of eight teams whose average attendance was 45 percent or more of listed capacity. The Outlaws would draw decent crowds of 25,403, 21,625, 22,017 and 29,324 later in the season.

During the team's season in Tulsa, all six of their wins came during inclement weather, 4 at home. Wins against Pittsburgh, Michigan, Houston, at Washington, and San Antonio came in rainy conditions, and a win against Chicago came in a Chicago snow storm.

=== Leaving Oklahoma ===
The Tathams were not exaggerating about Skelly Stadium's inadequacy as a professional venue. There was virtually no parking around the stadium, which would have held down attendance even without the weather problems. With no other facility in the Tulsa area suitable even for temporary use, they started searching for a new home. They initially planned to move to the University of Oklahoma's Owen Field while a new stadium was being built in Oklahoma City. However, when the USFL voted to move to the fall for the 1986 season, OU officials backed out of the deal. Bill Jr. then worked out a deal to play at Honolulu's Aloha Stadium, but Bill Sr. vetoed it.

The Tathams nearly had a deal to merge the Outlaws with the Oakland Invaders. However, the deal collapsed at the last minute because Invaders owner Tad Taube was unwilling to give control of the team to the younger Tatham. The Invaders ultimately merged with the Michigan Panthers.

Homeless and looking for options, the Tathams would turn to the 1984 Western Conference Champion Arizona Wranglers. Despite advancing all the way to the USFL title game after essentially trading rosters with the Chicago Blitz, the Wranglers' 1984 attendance figures—although respectable—were not enough to cover expenses. In fact, they were actually slightly below those of the 1983 Wranglers team. Owner Dr. Ted Diethrich, who had swapped the Blitz for the Wranglers in the 1983–84 offseason, had anticipated much higher attendance after bringing most of a team reckoned as an NFL-caliber unit to Phoenix. Additionally, he never was paid in full for selling the Chicago franchise rights after the new Blitz owner, James Hoffman, saw his finances collapse. After losing millions for the second year in a row, Diethrich wanted out.

Ultimately, Diethrich agreed to merge the Wranglers with the Outlaws. The merged team was to be known as the Arizona Outlaws, and would take the Wranglers' place at Arizona State University's Sun Devil Stadium. Initially, the Tathams owned 75 percent of the merged team, with Diethrich retaining 25 percent. However, Diethrich quickly decided to get out altogether. Since the Tathams inherited the Wranglers' player contracts, the deal was still widely reported as a merger. As a result, Phoenix received what amounted to its third USFL team in as many seasons.

=== Arizona Outlaws ===
Under the terms of the deal with Diethrich, the offseason roster for the new Arizona Outlaws comprised 20 players from the 1984 Wranglers, and 13 from the 1984 Outlaws. The Tathams retained many of the better players off both rosters, but not all of them. With few exceptions, they retained the 1984 Wranglers' defensive players and coaches, while bringing Williams and most of the 1984 Outlaws offense with them to Arizona. Rather than retaining the majority of the 1984 Western Conference Champion Wranglers and simply replacing retiring Wranglers QB Greg Landry with Williams, for the second year in a row little effort was made to retain players in which Phoenix fans felt a vested interest.

The Tathams did, however, name former Sun Devils coach Frank Kush as head coach. Kush was a hard-nosed, run-oriented coach who had struggled as coach of the NFL's Baltimore/Indianapolis Colts, largely because he had little luck handling professional quarterbacks. The Tathams may have been looking to the future by hiring Kush. By this time, they had become strong proponents of moving to the fall, and ultimately forcing a merger with the NFL (in which case their investment would have more than doubled). They knew Kush, who was still very much an icon in the region due to his successful 21-year tenure at ASU, would lend them instant credibility. However, he was a surprising choice to team with Williams.

In part due to Kush's reputation as a harsh taskmaster who frequently abused his players physically and emotionally, the players boycotted his press conference announcing his return to Phoenix after a six-year absence. However, Kush appeared to have mellowed considerably when training camp began. He complemented players and coaches and was friendly to the media. Years later, defensive line coach John Teerlinck claimed that Kush told him not to worry too much about winning, since it was very likely that the Outlaws would be one of the surviving teams in any merger with the NFL "and our owners will make a lot of money." Kush did, however, show flashes of his old heavy-handed self during film sessions, often calling his players unflattering nicknames.

In the instance of mergers, the league ran allocation drafts to send players to other teams. The Tathams allowed several of the better players on the Wranglers to be dispersed. In this way Wrangler star HB Tim Spencer, for example, ended up starting for Memphis in 1985. Other key Wranglers joined Landry in retirement or defected to other leagues (ex. CB Frank Minnifield who left in the 1984 season). Wrangler lead receiver Trumaine Johnson actually held out for the full season.

The 1985 season was very much a replay of 1984, with the Outlaws struggling after a quick start. The team jumped out to a 4–2 start, including a 31–13 pounding of the Herschel Walker and Doug Flutie-led New Jersey Generals. However, they proceeded to drop six in a row, and seven out of eight. They rebounded to win three straight, but did not get enough help to make the playoffs, and finished 8–10. Years later, Bill Jr. recalled that the former Wranglers and former Outlaws found it hard to get along. At one point, he threatened to fire the entire defensive staff unless the sniping ended.

The Outlaws were a much better rushing team in 1985 totalling 2019 yards in support of Williams and the passing game.

As had been the case with both versions of the Wranglers, Phoenix-area fans largely viewed the Outlaws with indifference. For the second year in a row, attendance dropped—from the 25,568 George Allen's Wranglers' drew the year before, to 17,881. The crowds looked even smaller than that due to the spacious configuration of Sun Devil Stadium. The Outlaws actually drew 4,000 fewer fans than they did in Tulsa, even though Sun Devil Stadium was almost double the size of Skelly Stadium. It did not help matters that the NFL's Philadelphia Eagles and St. Louis Cardinals were taking a serious look at moving to Phoenix which had rocketed to major-city status due to its explosive growth in the second half of the 20th century.

At one point, team revenue tailed off to the point that the Outlaws flew commercial flights to games rather than chartered jets. On one of those flights, from Houston back to Phoenix, the simmering tension on the team finally boiled over when Teerlinck got in a fight with offensive tackle Donnie Hickman. It exploded into an all-out brawl, and the plane was met by federal agents when it landed in Phoenix. Teerlinck was fired the next day. Despite this, the Tathams hoped to stick it out once the league won their lawsuit against the NFL.

The Outlaws were one of eight teams slated to play in 1986. After the Portland Breakers folded while the antitrust trial was still underway, the Outlaws were the only team west of the Mississippi River left in the league. While the league won the suit, it only received a nominal award of a dollar (trebled to $3 under antitrust law). The Outlaws, and the rest of the league, had been counting on the lawsuit money to finance their move to the fall and bail out their unsustainable spending. As the league had essentially staked its future on winning a hefty award in court, it suspended operations never to return.

In a last-ditch desperation move, in January 1987, Tatham met with the Canadian Football League hoping to transfer the Outlaws, along with any other USFL team that was willing and able, to the CFL. Under Tatham's proposal, the Outlaws would abide by the CFL's Canadian-born player quotas. The CFL's owners, who were facing their own financial crisis due to the loss of its television sponsorship, doubted that any commitment by a U.S. team to honor Canadian player quotas would withstand legal challenges. The CFL later stated that unless any prospective owner could deliver a television contract of at least $20 million a year (the USFL's contract with ESPN was offering $27 million a year for the 1986 season had it been held), it would not consider expanding into the United States. The CFL commissioner ultimately rejected the proposal (along with a similar one from Charles O. Finley), stating: "if any expansion takes place, it will be within the bounds of Canada."

Soon afterward, the Tathams abandoned any hope of bringing the Outlaws back, and concentrated their efforts on bringing an NFL expansion team to the Phoenix market. Those efforts were abandoned when the St. Louis Cardinals moved into Sun Devil Stadium for the 1988 NFL season.

==== 1985 Arizona Outlaws game results ====
Week	Date	Opponent	Result	Record	Venue	Attendance
Preseason
1	February 2	vs. Oakland Invaders	L 3–10	0–1	Mesa, Arizona	
2	February 9	vs. Oakland Invaders	L 0–12	0–2	Mesa, Arizona	
3	February 17	vs. Oakland Invaders	L 13–31	0–3	Fresno, California	10,204
Regular season
1	February 24	Portland Breakers	W 9–7	1–0	Sun Devil Stadium	20,351
2	March 3	at San Antonio Gunslingers	L 14–16	1–1	Alamo Stadium	11,151
3	March 11	Jacksonville Bulls	W 41–21	2–1	Sun Devil Stadium	13,025
4	March 16	at Tampa Bay Bandits	L 13–23	2–2	Tampa Stadium	41,381
5	March 23	Los Angeles Express	W 27–13	3–2	Sun Devil Stadium	20,835
6	March 30	New Jersey Generals	W 31–13	4–2	Sun Devil Stadium	20,835
7	April 8	at Denver Gold	L 7–28	4–3	Mile High Stadium	12,769
8	April 14	Orlando Renegades	L 19–24	4–4	Sun Devil Stadium	32,169
9	April 21	Houston Gamblers	L 17–33	4–5	Sun Devil Stadium	16,640
10	April 27	at Oakland Invaders	L 11–27	4–6	Oakland–Alameda County Coliseum	12,972
11	May 5	at Baltimore Stars	L 19–24	4–7	Byrd Stadium	14,432
12	May 12	Denver Gold	L 28–42	4–8	Sun Devil Stadium	5,731
13	May 19	at Portland Breakers	W 30–21	5–8	Civic Stadium	15,275
14	May 26	at Houston Gamblers	L 20–41	5–9	Houston Astrodome	12,696
15	June 1	San Antonio Gunslingers	W 13–3	6–9	Sun Devil Stadium	11,151
16	June 8	Oakland Invaders	W 28–21	7–9	Sun Devil Stadium	10,591
17	June 15	vs. Los Angeles Express	W 21–10	8–9	John Shepard Stadium, Los Angeles Pierce College, Los Angeles, California	8,200
18	June 22	at Memphis Showboats	L 28–38	8–10	Liberty Bowl Memorial Stadium	32,743

== Single-season leaders ==
Rushing yards: 1031 (1985), Reggie Brown

Receiving yards: 1087 (1984), Alphonso Williams

Passing yards: 3645 (1985), Doug Williams

== Season-by-season ==
Season records
Season	W	L	T	Finish	Playoff results
Oklahoma Outlaws
1984	6	12	0	4th WC Central	–
Arizona Outlaws
1985	8	10	0	4th WC	–
Totals	14	22	0	(including playoffs)	

== Outlaws in video games ==
The Outlaws' logo can be found in Madden NFL's Create-A-Team Feature. They are also featured in Blitz: The League, the Arizona Outlaws are a Division 3 team and are the first opponents against the player's created team.
