= Oakland Invaders =

American football team

General information
- Founded: 1977
- Folded: 1986
- Headquartered: Oakland–Alameda County Coliseum in Oakland, California
- Colors: Air Force Blue, Invader Gold, Navy, White

Personnel
- Owners: 1982–1985 Tad Taube; 1985 A. Alfred Taubman and Tad Taube
- Head coach: 1983–1984 John Ralston (9–12); 1984 Chuck Hutchison (7–8); 1985 Charlie Sumner (15-5-1)

Team history
- Twin Cities Cougars (1977–1982); Oakland Invaders (1983–1985)

Home fields
- Marysville High School field (1977–1982); Oakland–Alameda County Coliseum (1983–1985)

League / conference affiliations
- California Football League (1977–1982) United States Football League (1983–1985): Western Conference (1984–1985); Pacific Division (1983–1984)

Championships
- Conference championships: 1; 1985
- Division championships: 1; 1983

Playoff appearances (2)
- 1983, 1985

The Oakland Invaders were a professional American football team that played in the United States Football League (USFL) from 1983 through 1985. Based in Oakland, California, they played at the Oakland–Alameda County Coliseum.

The team can trace its history to 1977 when they played in the California Football League as the Twin Cities Cougars, and won four league championships (1979–1982). During that time, they played their home games at the Marysville High School field.

== History ==
=== In reaction to the Raiders relocating to Los Angeles ===
Oakland had been without a football team since the Oakland Raiders relocated to Los Angeles before the 1982 NFL season. The Invaders stepped in to fill the void; the similar name was no accident. One of the Invaders' first player signings was former Raider and 49er Cedrick Hardman, who came out of a one-year retirement to serve as player-coach.

The team was originally owned by Bay Area real estate magnates Jim Joseph and Tad Taube. However, after the original owner of the USFL's Los Angeles franchise, Alex Spanos, bought the San Diego Chargers instead, Joseph and Taube flipped a coin to decide who would buy the Los Angeles rights. Joseph won the toss, selling his stake in the Invaders to Taube. As it turned out, Joseph was forced to move his team to Phoenix, Arizona as the Arizona Wranglers.

=== 1983 season ===
Taube held fast to David Dixon's original blueprint for the USFL, heavily marketing the team in the Bay Area while keeping tight controls on spending (including player salaries).

Led by the league's 2nd ranked passer QB Fred Besana, WR Gordon Banks, and ex-Raiders HB Arthur Whittington and TE Raymond Chester, the Invaders finished with 9–9 record. However, in an extremely weak Pacific Division, this was enough to garner them the division title. In the playoffs, despite a valiant effort, they were overrun by the eventual league champion Michigan Panthers, 37–21 in front of 60,237 rabid fans in the Pontiac Silverdome (the largest crowd for any USFL game in the 1983 season).

==== 1983 schedule and results ====
Week	Date	Opponent	Result	Record	Venue	Attendance
Regular season
1	March 6	at Arizona Wranglers	W 24–0	1–0	Sun Devil Stadium	45,167
2	March 13	Birmingham Stallions	L 14–20 (OT)	1–1	Oakland-Alameda County Coliseum	47,344
3	March 19	at Michigan Panthers	W 33–27	2–1	Pontiac Silverdome	28,952
4	March 28	at Denver Gold	L 12–22	2–2	Mile High Stadium	38,720
5	April 3	at Los Angeles Express	L 7–10	2–3	Los Angeles Memorial Coliseum	23,538
6	April 10	at Boston Breakers	W 26–7	3–3	Nickerson Field	7,984
7	April 16	Philadelphia Stars	L 7–17	3–4	Oakland-Alameda County Coliseum	34,901
8	April 24	at Birmingham Stallions	L 9–21	3–5	Legion Field	18,500
9	May 2	Arizona Wranglers	W 34–20	4–5	Oakland-Alameda County Coliseum	27,460
10	May 8	Tampa Bay Bandits	L 10–17	4–6	Oakland-Alameda County Coliseum	26,989
11	May 16	Washington Federals	W 34–27	5–6	Oakland-Alameda County Coliseum	25,900
12	May 21	at Tampa Bay Bandits	L 9–29	5–7	Tampa Stadium	43,389
13	May 29	Los Angeles Express	W 20–10	6–7	Oakland-Alameda County Coliseum	28,967
14	June 4	New Jersey Generals	W 34–21	7–7	Oakland-Alameda County Coliseum	32,908
15	June 13	Denver Gold	W 16–10	8–7	Oakland-Alameda County Coliseum	26,840
16	June 20	at Philadelphia Stars	L 6–12	8–8	Veterans Stadium	16,933
17	June 25	Boston Breakers	W 17–16	9–8	Oakland-Alameda County Coliseum	30,396
18	July 3	at Chicago Blitz	L 7–31	9–9	Soldier Field	12,346
Playoffs
Divisional Playoff	July 10	at Michigan Panthers	L 21–37	0–1	Pontiac Silverdome	60,237

=== 1984 season ===
The Invaders were picked by most to again challenge for a playoff spot in 1984, but their powerful offense fell apart in the first half of the season, scoring only 82 points. The team was unable to run the ball and lost nine straight to open the season. With the emergence of RB Eric Jordan, the Invaders′ running attack rebounded and the team won seven of its last nine games to finish the season at 7-11. The defense was strong throughout the season, finishing seventh in points allowed. However, attendance tumbled to 23,644 per game – nearly 8,000 fewer than in 1983.

==== 1984 schedule and results ====
Week	Date	Opponent	Result	Record	Venue	Attendance
Preseason
1	January 29	vs. Arizona Wranglers	L 0–6	0–1	Sun Devil Stadium	
2	February 4	vs. Denver Gold	L 6–12	0–2	Francisco Grande, Arizona	
3	February 11	vs. Chicago Blitz	L 21–31	0–3	Mesa, Arizona	
4	February 18	vs. Michigan Panthers	W 7–6	1–3	Mesa, Arizona	
Regular season
1	February 26	at Arizona Wranglers	L 7–35	0–1	Sun Devil Stadium	29,176
2	March 4	New Orleans Breakers	L 0–13	0–2	Oakland-Alameda County Coliseum	41,200
3	March 11	Los Angeles Express	L 0–10	0–3	Oakland-Alameda County Coliseum	23,479
4	March 18	at Philadelphia Stars	L 7–28	0–4	Veterans Stadium	30,284
5	March 24	at San Antonio Gunslingers	L 10–14	0–5	Alamo Stadium	11,012
6	April 1	at Pittsburgh Maulers	L 14–28	0–6	Three Rivers Stadium	22,408
7	April 7	at Tampa Bay Bandits	L 0–24	0–7	Tampa Stadium	58,777
8	April 16	Houston Gamblers	L 27–35	0–8	Oakland-Alameda County Coliseum	18,320
9	April 22	Washington Federals	L 17–31	0–9	Oakland-Alameda County Coliseum	14,828
10	April 29	at Chicago Blitz	W 17–13	1–9	Soldier Field	7,802
11	May 5	Denver Gold	W 20–17 (OT)	2–9	Oakland-Alameda County Coliseum	19,331
12	May 13	Arizona Wranglers	W 14–3	3–9	Oakland-Alameda County Coliseum	20,004
13	May 19	Memphis Showboats	W 29–14	4–9	Oakland-Alameda County Coliseum	22,030
14	May 26	at Oklahoma Outlaws	W 17–14	5–9	Skelly Stadium	16,378
15	June 2	Jacksonville Bulls	W 17–12	6–9	Oakland-Alameda County Coliseum	29,687
16	June 9	Michigan Panthers	W 20–13	7–9	Oakland-Alameda County Coliseum	23,918
17	June 15	at Los Angeles Express	L 19–24	7–10	Los Angeles Memorial Coliseum	14,794
18	June 22	at Denver Gold	L 7–20	7–11	Mile High Stadium	32,623

=== 1985 season ===
As early as 1984, Taube had come to believe the USFL should move to the fall. He began looking for new investors when it became apparent that the USFL was going to vote to switch to fall play in 1986, knowing he would be competing directly with the San Francisco 49ers. However, unlike other USFL teams who would be going head-to-head against NFL teams, Taube had reason for optimism. The Raiders had successfully built their own niche market and fan base in Oakland for two decades, and there was at least a chance the Invaders could have survived in the same manner. He nearly merged his team with the Oklahoma Outlaws. However, talks collapsed when Outlaws owner William Tatham demanded that his son, Bill Jr., be given control over the merged team's football operations.

Taube then approached the Michigan Panthers, who had been one of the league's strongest teams during its first two years. Some observers reckoned them as an NFL-quality team; indeed, the Panthers had made a better account of themselves on the field than the Detroit Lions. However, Panthers owner A. Alfred Taubman was a strong supporter of spring football, and had no desire to directly compete with the Lions. Knowing that he would not even begin to be able to go head-to-head with the Lions even if he'd been inclined to do so, he had begun putting out feelers for a merger partner when it became clear that the move to the fall was a foregone conclusion.

Taubman and Taube and quickly reached a deal for a merger. The Invaders would be the surviving team, but Taube sold controlling interest in the merged team to Taubman while remaining chairman of the board. The merger was formally announced after the owners approved moving to the fall.

The new team, bolstered with key players from the Panthers such as Bobby Hebert, went a league-best 13–4–1 in the regular season and advanced all the way to the 1985 USFL championship game. The championship game was a rematch of sorts with Chuck Fusina's Stars, who now played in Baltimore; the Panthers had upended the Stars in the league's inaugural title game. The Invaders were in the midst of a potential game-winning drive when a personal-foul penalty derailed their momentum, allowing the Stars to defeat Hebert's Invaders 28–24, and claim indisputable bragging rights as the league's all-time best team.

Despite reaching the championship game, the team's attendance fell again, to a barely sustainable 17,509. Soon after the championship game, Taubman decided to pull out. The loss of Taubman's wealth left the Invaders without nearly enough resources for the move to the fall, and they suspended operations for the 1986 season. As it turned out, the championship game was the last USFL game ever played, as the league was effectively killed by an antitrust suit against the NFL in which it only won $3 in damages.

==== 1985 schedule and results ====
Week	Date	Opponent	Result	Record	Venue	Attendance
Preseason
1	February 2	vs. Arizona Outlaws	W 10–3	1–0	Mesa, Arizona	
2	February 9	vs. Arizona Outlaws	W 12–0	2–0	Mesa, Arizona	
3	February 17	vs. Arizona Outlaws	W 31–13	3–0	Fresno, California	10,204
Regular Season
1	February 24	Denver Gold	W 31–10	1–0	Oakland-Alameda County Coliseum	23,622
2	March 3	Baltimore Stars	T 17–17 (OT)	1–0–1	Oakland-Alameda County Coliseum	20,495
3	March 10	Houston Gamblers	L 7–42	1–1–1	Oakland-Alameda County Coliseum	16,037
4	March 17	Jacksonville Bulls	W 42–36	2–1–1	Oakland-Alameda County Coliseum	16,678
5	March 24	at Memphis Showboats	W 31–19	3–1–1	Liberty Bowl Memorial Stadium	28,773
6	March 31	at Los Angeles Express	W 30–6	4–1–1	Los Angeles Memorial Coliseum	11,619
7	April 6	at Portland Breakers	L 17–30	4–2–1	Civic Stadium	23,388
8	April 13	at Birmingham Stallions	L 17–20	4–3–1	Legion Field	44,500
9	April 22	San Antonio Gunslingers	W 27–20	5–3–1	Oakland-Alameda County Coliseum	18,215
10	April 27	Arizona Outlaws	W 27–11	6–3–1	Oakland-Alameda County Coliseum	12,972
11	May 5	at Orlando Renegades	W 21–7	7–3–1	Florida Citrus Bowl	21,085
12	May 11	Los Angeles Express	W 27–6	8–3–1	Oakland-Alameda County Coliseum	12,482
13	May 18	at San Antonio Gunslingers	W 24–21	9–3–1	Alamo Stadium	7,118
14	May 23	at Denver Gold	W 31–16	10–3–1	Mile High Stadium	12,372
15	June 2	Portland Breakers	W 38–20	11–3–1	Oakland-Alameda County Coliseum	12,740
16	June 8	at Arizona Outlaws	L 21–28	11–4–1	Sun Devil Stadium	10,591
17	June 15	New Jersey Generals	W 34–29	12–4–1	Oakland-Alameda County Coliseum	24,338
18	June 24	at Houston Gamblers	W 31–21	13–4–1	Houston Astrodome	15,797
Playoffs
Quarterfinal	June 30	Tampa Bay Bandits	W 30–27	1–0	Oakland–Alameda County Coliseum	19,346
Semifinal	July 6	at Memphis Showboats	W 28–19	2–0	Liberty Bowl Memorial Stadium	37,796
USFL Championship	July 14	vs. Baltimore Stars	L 24–28	2–1	Giants Stadium	49,263

== Past and future National Football League players ==
- Gary Anderson
- Albert Bentley
- Ray Bentley
- Dave Browning
- Anthony Carter
- Raymond Chester
- Frank Duncan
- Cedrick Hardman
- Derek Holloway
- Bobby Hebert
- Alva Liles
- Dewey McClain
- Dale Markham
- Ray Pinney
- Gary Plummer
- Mike Shumann
- Angelo Snipes
- Randy Van Divier
- Arthur Whittington
- Vito McKeever

Invaders executive William Hambrecht later emerged as a founder of the United Football League.

== Single-season leaders ==
Rushing Yards: 1,045 (1983), Arthur Whittington

Receiving Yards: 1,323 (1985), Anthony Carter

Passing Yards: 3,980 (1983), Fred Besana

== Season-by-season ==
Season records
Season	W	L	T	Finish	Playoff results
1983	9	9	0	1st Pacific	Lost Divisional (Michigan)
1984	7	11	0	4th WC Pacific	
1985	13	4	1	1st WC	Won Quarterfinal (Tampa Bay); Won Semifinal (Memphis); Lost USFL Championship (Baltimore)
Totals	31	26	1	(including playoffs)	
