= 1983 Boston Breakers season =

Defunct football team in the USFL

- Owner: George Matthews
- General manager: Randy Vataha
- Head coach: Dick Coury
- Home stadium: Nickerson Field

Results
- Record: 11–7
- Division place: 2nd Atlantic Division
- Playoffs: Did not qualify

The team started out in 1983 as the Boston Breakers, owned by Boston businessman George Matthews and former New England Patriots wide receiver Randy Vataha. However, finding a stadium proved difficult. The lack of a professional-quality stadium had stymied previous attempts at pro football in Boston before the Patriots arrived in 1960.

The largest stadium in the region was Schaefer Stadium in Foxborough, home of the Patriots. However, it was owned by the Sullivan family, owners of the Patriots, and Matthews and Vataha were not willing to have an NFL team as their landlord. As a result, their initial choice for a home facility was Harvard Stadium, but Harvard University rejected them almost out of hand. They finally settled on Nickerson Field on the campus of Boston University, which seated only 21,000 people – the smallest stadium in the league. The team's cheerleaders were called "Heartbreakers".

Coach Dick Coury put together a fairly competitive team led by quarterback Johnnie Walton (then 36 years old, a former Continental Football League and World Football League alumnus who had been out of football since the late 1970s) and Canadian Football League veteran halfback Richard Crump. The Breakers finished 11–7, finishing one game behind the Chicago Blitz for the final playoff spot. Walton, who had retired from pro football years earlier and had spent the previous three years coaching college football, was the league's seventh ranked passer. Coury was named coach of the year.

Despite fielding a fairly solid team, playing in Nickerson Field doomed the team in Boston. The stadium had been built in 1955 (though parts of it dated to 1915), and had not aged well. It was so small that the Breakers lost money even when they sold out as visiting teams got a portion of the gate proceeds. The Breakers and Washington Federals were the only teams to draw fewer than 14,000 per game in 1983. The other 10 teams drew over 18,000 per game. (The fans who came to the games were generally passionate; the documentary Small Potatoes: Who Killed the USFL? made note of a particular Breakers victory in which fans stormed the field afterward.)

Concluding that Nickerson Field was not suitable even for temporary use, Matthews again approached Harvard, but the school refused again. He then hashed out a deal to move to Foxborough, but ultimately decided against being a tenant of an NFL team. He considered an offer to sell a stake in the team to Jacksonville, Florida businessman Fred Bullard, but pulled out after Bullard proposed firing Coury in favor of Florida State coach Bobby Bowden. (Bullard would ultimately land an expansion franchise, the Jacksonville Bulls.) After floating offers to move to Seattle, Honolulu, and Portland, Matthews decided to move to New Orleans. He sold a 31 percent interest to New Orleans real estate developer Joe Canizaro, and the move was approved by the USFL on October 18, 1983. Matthews later sold his remaining stake to Canizaro, but Vataha remained as team president.

== Personnel ==
=== Staff ===
1983 Boston Breakers staff
Front office: Owner – George Matthews; General manager – Randy Vataha; Head coaches: Head coach – Dick Coury; Offensive coaches: Offensive Coordinator - Roman Gabriel; Quarterbacks – Roman Gabriel; Wide receivers – Steve Coury; Tight ends – Bill Redell; Offensive line – Keith Rowen	Defensive coaches: Defensive Coordinator - Doug Kay; Defensive line – Curt Jones; Linebackers – Dale Lindsey; Defensive backs – Doug Kay; Special teams coaches: Special teams coordinator – Keith Rowen

=== Roster ===
1983 Boston Breakers roster
Quarterbacks (QB): 10 John Walton; 18 Doug Woodward; Running backs (RB): 26 Richard Crump; 25 Tony Davis; 38 Derek Hughes; 39 Dennis Johnson; 33 Anthony Steels; Wide receivers (WR): 84 Nolan Franz; 32 Frank Lockett; 83 Charlie Smith; Tight ends (TE): 87 David Bayle; 81 Beau Coash; 89 Chris Combs	Offensive linemen (OL): 78 Bruce Branch G; 72 Louis Bullard T; 69 Jerell Franklin G; 64 Greg Horton G; 62 Dan Hurley T; 50 Mike Katolin C; 53 Mike McLaughlin C; 65 Gerry Raymond G; Defensive linemen (DL): 61 Jeff Gaylord NT/DE; 66 Billy Don Jackson DE/NT; 71 Oudious Lee NT; 73 Larry McClain DE; 68 Ernie Price DE; 75 Daryl Wilkerson DE	Linebackers (LB): 48 Matt Bradley OLB; 58 Mike Brewington ILB; 55 Bill Gompf ILB; 56 Marcus Marek ILB; 59 Ben Needham OLB; 52 Ray Philips OLB; 51 Bill Roe ILB; Defensive backs (DB): 24 M. L. Carter CB; 42 Charlie Harbison CB/SS; 23 Lyndell Jones CB; 40 Terry Love SS; 36 Joe Restic FS/P; 22 Tim Smith FS; 20 Woodrow Wilson CB; Special teams (ST): 1 Dario Casarino P; 5 Tim Mazzetti K	Practice squad: 63 John Andreoli LB; 43 Louie Giammona RB; 54 Gary Gibson LB; 60 Brad Johnson C; 67 John Schmeding G; 70 Pat Staub T; 88 Dwayne Strozier WR; Reserve: 57 Orlando Flanagan LB; -- Jimmy Hargrove RB (Left squad); 32 Andy Johnson RB; Rookies in italics

== USFL draft ==
Round	Pick	Player	Position	School
2	14	Leonard Smith	Defensive Back	McNeese State
3	35	Clint Sampson	Wide Receiver	San Diego State
4	38	George Harris	Linebacker	Houston
5	59	John Tuggle	Running Back	California
6	62	John Courtney	Defensive Tackle	South Carolina State
7	83	Dan Dufour	Center	UCLA
8	86	Todd Seabaugh	Linebacker	San Diego State
9	102	Tom Holmoe	Defensive Back	BYU
9	107	Marcus Marek	Linebacker	Ohio State
10	110	Lorenzo Bouier	Running Back	Maine
10	115	Mark Brown	Linebacker	Purdue
11	131	Walter Ross	Running Back	Northern State
12	134	Herkie Walls	Wide Receiver	Texas
12	139	Jeff Turk	Defensive Back	Boise State
13	155	Darral Hambrick	Wide Receiver	UNLV
14	158	Charles Young	Defensive Tackle	North Texas

== Schedule ==
Week	Date	Opponent	Result	Record	Venue	Attendance
1	March 6	at Tampa Bay Bandits	L 17–21	0–1	Tampa Stadium	42,437
2	March 13	at Denver Gold	W 21–7	1–1	Mile High Stadium	41,926
3	March 20	Washington Federals	W 19–16	2–1	Nickerson Field	18,430
4	March 27	at New Jersey Generals	W 31–21	3–1	Giants Stadium	41,218
5	April 2	Birmingham Stallions	W 27–16	4–1	Nickerson Field	10,976
6	April 10	Oakland Invaders	L 7–26	4–2	Nickerson Field	7,984
7	April 17	at Arizona Wranglers	W 44–23	5–2	Sun Devil Stadium	20,911
8	April 24	at Philadelphia Stars	L 16–23	5–3	Veterans Stadium	10,257
9	May 1	Michigan Panthers	L 24–28	5–4	Nickerson Field	10,971
10	May 7	at Los Angeles Express	L 20–23	5–5	Los Angeles Memorial Coliseum	16,307
11	May 15	Denver Gold	W 17–9	6–5	Nickerson Field	4,173
12	May 22	at Washington Federals	W 21–14	7–5	RFK Stadium	7,303
13	May 29	Philadelphia Stars	W 21–17	8–5	Nickerson Field	15,668
14	June 6	Chicago Blitz	W 21–15	9–5	Nickerson Field	15,087
15	June 12	at Birmingham Stallions	L 19–31	9–6	Legion Field	20,500
16	June 19	Tampa Bay Bandits	W 24–17	10–6	Nickerson Field	15,530
17	June 25	at Oakland Invaders	L 16–17	10–7	Oakland-Alameda County Stadium	30,396
18	July 3	New Jersey Generals	W 34–10	11–7	Nickerson Field	15,798

== Standings ==
USFL Atlantic Division
	W	L	T	PCT	DIV	PF	PA	STK
Philadelphia Stars	15	3	0	.833	4–2	379	204	L1
Boston Breakers	11	7	0	.611	5–1	399	334	W1
New Jersey Generals	6	12	0	.333	2–4	314	437	L1
Washington Federals	4	14	0	.222	1–5	297	422	W2

== Awards ==
Award	Winner	Position
All-USFL Team	Marcus Marek	LB
All-USFL Team	Tim Mazzetti	K
USFL Coach of the Year	Dick Coury	Head coach
USFL Coach of the Year (TSN)	Dick Coury	Head coach

== Final statistics ==
=== Offense ===
Breakers Passing
	C/ATT	Yds	TD	INT
John Walton	330/589	3772	20	18
Doug Woodward	16/26	136	3	1
Tim Mazzetti	1/1	15	0	0
Charlie Smith	0/1	0	0	0
Breakers Rushing
	Car	Yds	TD	LG
Richard Crump	190	990	8	62
Tony Davis	139	443	6	21
Anthony Steels	55	237	1	18
Dennis Johnson	44	165	1	20
Andy Johnson	13	62	0	14
John Walton	12	32	2	10
Doug Woodward	4	28	0	12
Derek Hughes	6	15	0	7
Charlie Smith	3	13	0	8
Frank Lockett	8	–7	0	7
Mitch Hoopes	1	–11	0	–11
Joe Restic	1	–21	0	–21
Breakers Receiving
	Rec	Yds	TD	LG
Nolan Franz	62	848	4	50
Charlie Smith	54	1009	5	58
Richard Crump	44	315	4	22
Tony Davis	42	260	1	18
Frank Lockett	37	535	3	86
Beau Coash	25	343	1	44
Dennis Johnson	23	110	1	12
Anthony Steels	20	148	3	27
Andy Johnson	17	150	0	22
Louie Giammona	13	75	1	16
David Bayle	7	106	0	22
Dwayne Strozier	1	12	0	12
Chris Combs	1	11	0	11
Billy Taylor	1	1	0	1

=== Defense ===
Breakers Sacks
	Sacks
Daryl Wilkerson	6.0
Ray Philips	6.0
Larry McClain	6.0
Jeff Gaylord	4.0
Oudious Lee	4.0
Terry Love	3.0
Ben Needham	2.0
Charles Harbison	2.0
Bill Roe	2.0
Joe Restic	2.0
Ernie Price	1.0
Robert Geathers	1.0
Billy Don Jackson	1.0
Marcus Tarver	1.0
Marcus Marek	1.0

Breakers Interceptions
	Int	Yds	TD	LG	PD
Woodrow Wilson	4	45	0	32	
Marcus Marek	4	23	0	10	
Ben Needham	3	10	0	8	
Joe Restic	3	8	0	8	
Terry Love	3	105	0	102	
Charles Harbison	2	66	0	46	
Tim Smith	2	50	0	31	
Ray Philips	2	12	0	7	
Lyndell Jones	1	33	0	33	
Mike Brewington	1	10	0	10	
M.L. Carter	1	0	0	0	

Breakers Fumbles
	FF	Fmb	FR	Yds	TD
Richard Crump		9	3	0	0
Tony Davis		7	3	0	0
Andy Johnson		4	1	0	0
Dave Riley		3	1	0	0
John Walton		3	1	0	0
Woodrow Wilson		3	1	0	0
Nolan Franz		2	1	0	0
Dennis Johnson		2	0	0	0
Ira Matthews		2	0	0	0
Daryl Wilkerson		1	2	15	0
David Bayle		1	0	0	0
Derek Hughes		1	1	0	0
Mike Katolin		1	0	0	0
Oudious Lee		1	1	0	0
Frank Lockett		1	3	0	0
Charlie Smith		1	1	0	0
Tim Smith		1	0	0	0
Anthony Steels		1	0	0	0
Doug Woodward		1	1	0	0

=== Special teams ===
Breakers Kicking
	FGM–FGA	XPM–XPA
Tim Mazzetti	27-35	38-38

Breakers Punting
	Pnt	Yds	Lng	Blck
Dario Casarino	55	2345	72	0
Mitch Hoopes	23	866	60	0
Joe Restic	11	386	51	0

Breakers Kick Returns
	Ret	Yds	TD	Lng
Woodrow Wilson	15	336	0	43
Ira Matthews	13	210	0	27
Anthony Steels	13	204	0	26
Derek Hughes	6	123	0	25
Louie Giammona	4	83	0	27
Frank Lockett	2	66	0	40
Charlie Smith	3	45	0	22
Charles Harbison	2	18	0	10
Bill Gompf	1	18	0	18
Richard Crump	1	13	0	13
Ben Needham	1	5	0	5

Breakers Punt Returns
	Ret	Yds	TD	Lng
Woodrow Wilson	15	122	0	26
Anthony Steels	8	45	0	12
Louie Giammona	10	44	0	13
Nolan Franz	5	29	0	10
Ira Matthews	3	15	0	10
