= Steve Coury =

American gridiron football player (born 1957)

Current position
- Title: Head coach
- Team: Lake Oswego HS (OR)

Playing career
- 1976–1979: Oregon State
- 1980: Ottawa Rough Riders
- Position: Wide receiver

Coaching career (HC unless noted)
- 1983–1985: Portland Breakers (WR)
- 1986–1988: Pittsburgh (assistant)
- 1992–present: Lake Oswego HS (OR)

Accomplishments and honors

Championships
- 3 OSAA Division 6A (2011, 2018, 2025)

Awards
- Third-team All-American (1979); First-team All-Pac-10 (1979)

Steve Coury (born 1957) is an American former football wide receiver for the Oregon State Beavers and a current high school football coach at Lake Oswego High School and business executive.

== Playing career ==
The son of college and professional football coach Dick Coury, Steve Coury attended Lakeridge High School in Lake Oswego, Oregon where he played wide receiver, before moving on to Oregon State in 1976. Despite the team's overall poor performance during the years he played (the team won just 8 games in his four seasons), Coury was named an All-American in 1979.

When he left Oregon State, he held the records for career receiving yards (1,837) and career receptions (135), and remains in the team's top ten for both statistics. He is tied with Reggie Bynum for the school record for most touchdowns in a half with 3. He was inducted into the Oregon State University Sports Hall of Fame in 2003.

Following his college career, Coury played one season with the Ottawa Rough Riders of the Canadian Football League.

== Coaching career ==
Following his playing days, Coury began coaching football. He coached high school football at Crespi Carmelite High School in Encino, California, coached wide receivers for the Portland Breakers of the USFL from 1983 to 1985 (where his father was head coach), and was an assistant football coach at the University of Pittsburgh for three years. In 1992, he was named head football coach at Lake Oswego High School.

Coury has led the Lakers to nine state football championship appearances and to state titles in 2011, 2018, and 2025. Since 1992, Coury has had a record of 295–97 as of 2025.

== Outside of football ==
In addition to his head coaching duties, Coury is vice president of SporTech, the West Coast distributor for playing surfaces. He and his wife Nancy have three children and live in Lake Oswego.
