= Oudious Lee =

American football player (born 1956)

No. 74, 71, 65
- Position: Nose tackle

Personal information
- Born: June 14, 1956 (age 70); Omaha, Nebraska, U.S.
- Listed height: 6 ft 1 in (1.85 m)
- Listed weight: 253 lb (115 kg)

Career information
- High school: South (Omaha)
- College: Nebraska (1976–1979)
- NFL draft: 1980: undrafted

Career history
- Philadelphia Eagles (1980)*; St. Louis Cardinals (1980); Cincinnati Bengals (1982)*; Boston/New Orleans Breakers (1983–1984); Denver Gold (1984)
- * Offseason or practice squad member only
- Stats at Pro Football Reference

Oudious Lee, Jr. (born June 14, 1956) is an American former professional football nose tackle who played one season with the St. Louis Cardinals of the National Football League (NFL). He played college football at the University of Nebraska–Lincoln.

== Early life and college ==
Oudious Lee, Jr. was born on June 14, 1956, in Omaha, Nebraska. He attended Omaha South High School in Omaha.

Lee was a member of the Nebraska Cornhuskers of University of Nebraska–Lincoln from 1976 to 1979 and a three-year letterman from 1977 to 1979.

== Professional career ==
Lee signed with the Philadelphia Eagles of the National Football League (NFL) on May 5, 1980, after going undrafted in the 1980 NFL draft. He was released on August 26, 1980.

Lee signed with the St. Louis Cardinals on December 17, 1980, and played in one game during the 1980 season. Lee was later released on August 25, 1981.

Lee was signed by the Cincinnati Bengals on May 1, 1982. He was released on September 6, 1982.

Lee signed with the Boston Breakers of the United States Football League (USFL) on February 10, 1983. He played in all 18 games, starting four, for the Breakers during the 1983 USFL season and posted four sacks. He made $60,000 in 1983.

On March 15, 1984, Lee was traded to the Denver Gold for an undisclosed draft pick. He spent several weeks with the team before being released.

Lee worked out for the Houston Gamblers in April 1984. The Gamblers reportedly offered him a $38,000 contract but he rejected it due to the money not being guaranteed.

== Personal life ==
Lee's son, Malcolm Lee, played college football for the Kansas Jayhawks.
