= Bill Roe (American football) =

American football player (1958–2003)

No. 56, 51, 52, 54
- Position: Linebacker

Personal information
- Born: February 6, 1958; South Bend, Indiana, U.S.
- Died: September 13, 2003 (aged 45); Anaheim, California, U.S.
- Listed height: 6 ft 3 in (1.91 m)
- Listed weight: 233 lb (106 kg)

Career information
- High school: Thornwood (South Holland, Illinois)
- College: Colorado
- NFL draft: 1980: 3rd round, 78th overall pick

Career history
- Dallas Cowboys (1980–1981); Boston Breakers (1983); Memphis Showboats (1984); Birmingham Stallions (1984–1985); New Orleans Saints (1987)

Awards and highlights
- Second-team All-Big Eight (1979)

Career NFL statistics
- Games played: 19
- Stats at Pro Football Reference

William Oliver Roe II (February 6, 1958 – September 13, 2003) was an American professional football player who was a linebacker in the National Football League (NFL) for the Dallas Cowboys and New Orleans Saints. He also was a member of the Boston Breakers, Memphis Showboats and Birmingham Stallions in the United States Football League (USFL). He played college football for the Colorado Buffaloes.

== Early life ==
Roe attended Thornwood High School, where he practiced football, basketball, baseball and track. He accepted a football scholarship from the University of Colorado Boulder. He became a starter at inside linebacker as a junior and received honorable mention All-Big Eight honors. He lost the final 3 games with a right knee injury, which required offseason surgery.

As a senior, he received All-Big Eight honors, after leading the conference in tackles (162) and the team in interceptions (3). He also had 10 tackles for loss, 3 sacks and 10 or more tackles in seven games, becoming the first player to win Big Eight Defensive Player of the Week honors two weeks in a row (Nov. 17 and Nov. 24). He posted 12 unassisted tackles and one sack against the University of Kansas. He registered 18 tackles against the University of Missouri. He returned an interception for a 69-yard touchdown against Nebraska. His best game came against Kansas State University, when he registered 24 tackles (second most in school history) and 2 interceptions. In 1978, he won the school's heavyweight boxing championship.

== Professional career ==
=== Dallas Cowboys ===
After the Dallas Cowboys entered the 1980 NFL draft without their first and second round draft choices (traded to the Baltimore Colts for John Dutton), the team made Roe their first selection in the third round (78th overall). As a rookie, he played mainly on special teams.

On August 24, 1981, he was placed on the injured reserve list with a sprained ankle. He was released on September 3, 1982.

=== Boston Breakers (USFL) ===
In January 1983, he signed with the Denver Gold of the United States Football League, which traded him along with the rights to Dick Jauron to the Boston Breakers in February, in exchange for the rights to Tom Davis and an eighth round draft choice. The Breakers named him their starting inside linebacker.

=== Memphis Showboats (USFL) ===
In 1984, he was the Memphis Showboats starting inside linebacker, before being traded in May to the Birmingham Stallions in exchange for a future draft choice.

=== Birmingham Stallions (USFL) ===
With the Birmingham Stallions he was a standout linebacker on the league's top defense, before the United States Football League folded.

=== New Orleans Saints ===
After the players went on a strike on the third week of the 1987 season, those contests were canceled (reducing the 16-game season to 15) and the NFL decided that the games would be played with replacement players. Roe was signed to be a part of the New Orleans Saints replacement team, that was given the mock name "Saint Elsewheres" by the media. He went on to start all three games at linebacker, before being released once the strike ended.

== Personal life ==
Roe died on September 13, 2003.
