= Doug Woodward (American football) =

American gridiron football player (born 1958)

Doug Woodward (born September 12, 1958) is a former American football quarterback in the United States Football League (USFL) who played for the Boston/New Orleans/Portland Breakers and New Jersey Generals. He played college football for the Pace Setters. He also played in the Canadian Football League (CFL) for the Calgary Stampeders.
