= Dick Coury =

American football coach (1929–2020)

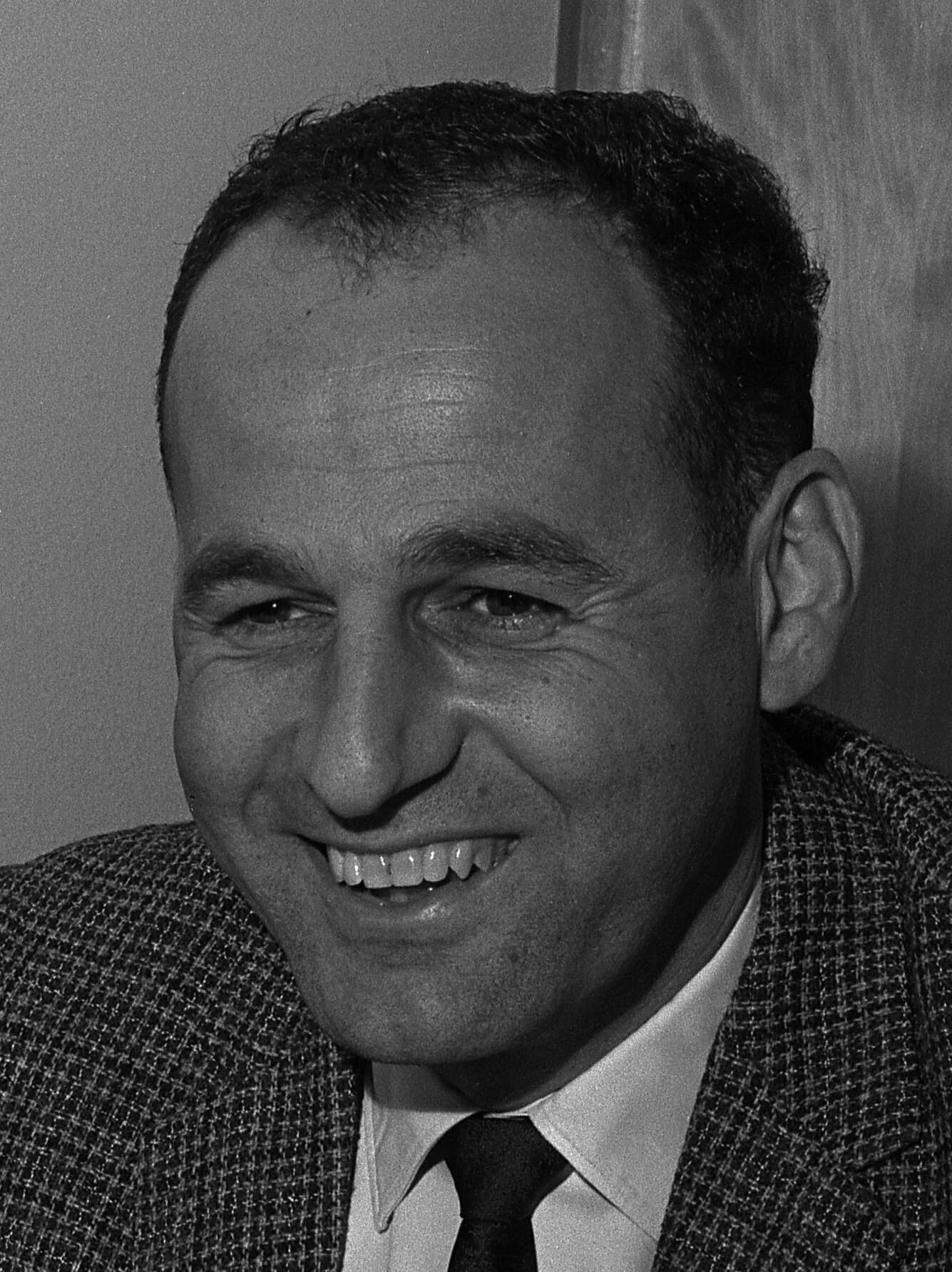
- Coury in 1965

Biographical details
- Born: September 29, 1929; Athens, Ohio, U.S.
- Died: August 15, 2020 (aged 90)
- Education: University of Notre Dame

Coaching career (HC unless noted)
- 1957–1965: Mater Dei HS (CA)
- 1966–1968: USC (DC)
- 1969: Pittsburgh Steelers (assistant)
- 1970–1971: Cal State Fullerton
- 1972–1973: Denver Broncos (WR)
- 1974: Portland Storm
- 1975: San Diego Chargers (LB)
- 1976–1981: Philadelphia Eagles (WR)
- 1983–1985: Boston / New Orleans / Portland Breakers
- 1986–1990: Los Angeles Rams (QB)
- 1991–1992: New England Patriots (OC)
- 1993: Minnesota Vikings (assistant)
- 1994: Houston Oilers (OC)
- 1995–1996: Houston Oilers (OA/PG)
- 1997–1998: St. Louis Rams (WR)

Head coaching record
- Overall: 32–41–1 (professional); 13–8–1 (college); 85–9–5 (high school)

Accomplishments and honors

Championships
- 3 CIF Southern Section (Southern Group 1957, 2-A Division 1960, 4-A Division 1965)

Awards
- USFL Coach of the Year (1983)

Richard P. Coury (September 29, 1929 – August 15, 2020) was an American football coach. In a career that spanned across five decades, Coury coached with distinction on the high school, college, and professional levels. His most prominent posts were as head football coach at Mater Dei High School (CA) from 1957 to 1965, Cal State Fullerton from 1970 to 1971, the Portland Storm of the World Football League (WFL) in 1974, and the Boston/New Orleans/Portland Breakers of the United States Football League (USFL) from 1983 to 1985. He was named USFL Coach of the Year in 1983.

== Biography ==
Coury was born to Lebanese-American parents, Thomas ("Tannous") and Mary Coury ("Khouri"). Thomas immigrated to the US in 1903 from Beirut, and Mary followed in 1910. Coury grew up in Athens, Ohio and was a star athlete in football, basketball, and baseball at Athens High School. A 1951 University of Notre Dame graduate, Coury was not a football player, but served as a student assistant for head coach Frank Leahy. After graduating from Notre Dame with a bachelor's degree in physical education, Coury enlisted in the U.S. Army where he, with a recommendation from Coach Leahy, became the backfield coach for the Camp Drake Bulldogs, a football team composed of U.S. Army Soldiers stationed in Japan during the Korean War. It would be the closest Corporal Coury would come to the shores of Korea. His first full-time coaching position was an assistant at Mater Dei High School in 1953 under head coach Tom Carter for two seasons, then under Steve Musseau until 1956. After four seasons, Coury moved up to head the program, compiling a record of 85–9–5 from 1957 to 1965, winning seven league titles and three CIF Southern Section championships along with one runner-up finish. Among his many star players included quarterback and future Heisman Trophy winner John Huarte. He then joined University of Southern California coach John McKay's staff as defensive coordinator in 1966, helping the Trojans to four consecutive Rose Bowls along with a national championship in 1967.

Coury then moved on to Cal State Fullerton, serving as the school's first head coach, tallying a record of 13–8–1 from 1970 and 1971.

Coury had also held coaching positions with the Denver Broncos, Houston Oilers, Los Angeles Rams, Minnesota Vikings, New England Patriots, Philadelphia Eagles, Pittsburgh Steelers and San Diego Chargers in the National Football League. His last coaching job was with the St. Louis Rams before he retired in 1999 to become a scout.

Coury died on August 15, 2020, at the age of 90.

== Personal ==
Coury was the father of current Lake Oswego High School football head coach Steve Coury.

== Head coaching record ==
=== High School ===
Year	Team	Regular Season					Postseason
Year	Team	Won	Lost	Ties	Win %	Finish	Result
1957	Mater Dei	11	0	1	.958	1st in Parochial League	CIF-SS Southern Group Champions
1958	Mater Dei	9	2	1	.792	1st in Parochial League	CIF-SS 2-A Division Semifinalists
1959	Mater Dei	11	1	0	.917	1st in Parochial League	CIF-SS 2-A Division Finalists
1960	Mater Dei	11	1	0	.917	1st in Parochial League	CIF-SS 2-A Division Champions
1961	Mater Dei	6	2	1	.722	T-2nd in Angelus League	did not qualify
1962	Mater Dei	9	1	1	.864	1st in Angelus League	CIF-SS 3-A Division Quarterfinalists
1963	Mater Dei	9	1	0	.900	1st in Angelus League	CIF-SS 4-A Division First Round
1964	Mater Dei	7	1	0	.875	2nd in Angelus League	did not qualify
1965	Mater Dei	12	0	1	.962	1st in Angelus League	CIF-SS 4-A Division Champions
Total		85	9	5	.884		

=== College ===
Year	Team	Overall	Conference	Standing	Bowl/playoffs
Cal State Fullerton Titans (California Collegiate Athletic Association) (1970–1971)
1970	Cal State Fullerton	6–4–1	3–1	2nd	
1971	Cal State Fullerton	7–4	3–1	2nd	
Cal State Fullerton:		13–8–1	6–2		
Total:		13–8–1			

=== WFL ===
Year	Team	Regular Season					Postseason			
Year	Team	Won	Lost	Ties	Win %	Finish	Won	Lost	Win %	Result
1974	Portland Storm	7	12	1	.375	T-3rd in Western Division	did not qualify			
Total		7	12	1	.375		-	-	–	

=== USFL ===
Year	Team	Regular Season					Postseason			
Year	Team	Won	Lost	Ties	Win %	Finish	Won	Lost	Win %	Result
1983	Boston Breakers	11	7	0	.611	2nd in Atlantic Division	did not qualify			
1984	New Orleans Breakers	8	10	0	.444	3rd in Southern Division	did not qualify			
1985	Portland Breakers	6	12	0	.611	4th in Western Conference	did not qualify			
Total		25	29	0	.463		-	-	–	
