= Charlie Harbison =

American football player and coach (born 1958)

Personal information
- Born: October 27, 1958 (age 68); Shelby, North Carolina, U.S.

Career information
- College: Gardner–Webb (1978–1981)

Career history

Playing
- Buffalo Bills (1982); Boston / New Orleans Breakers (1983–1984)

Coaching
- Gardner–Webb (1992–1993) Wide receivers coach; UTEP (1994) Defensive backs coach; Clemson (1995–1997) Defensive backs coach; Alabama (1998–2000) Defensive backs coach; LSU (2001–2002) Defensive backs coach; Alabama (2003–2006) Wide receivers coach; Mississippi State (2007–2008) Defensive coordinator; Clemson (2009–2012) Defensive coordinator & defensive backs coach; Auburn (2013–2014) Defensive coordinator & safeties coach; Louisiana (2015–2017) Defensive coordinator & defensive backs coach; Arizona Cardinals (2018) Assistant defensive backs coach; Appalachian State (2019) Cornerbacks coach; Missouri (2020–2021) Associate head coach & defensive backs coach

Charles Edward Harbison (born October 27, 1958) is an American football coach who served as an assistant defensive backs coach for the Arizona Cardinals of the National Football League (NFL). He was previously the defensive coordinator and defensive backs coach at the University of Louisiana at Lafayette.

== Playing career ==
Harbison played college football at Gardner–Webb University for four seasons. In 1982, he signed as a free agent with the Buffalo Bills for the season. He then played two seasons with the Boston/New Orleans Breakers of the USFL.

== Coaching career ==
=== College ===
Harbison has served on coaching staffs primarily as a wide receiver or secondary coach. He was the co-defensive coordinator and defensive backs coach at Auburn University. Prior to his hiring at Auburn, he was the defensive backs' coach and co-defensive coordinator at Clemson University.

Harbison helped Clemson to a top 25 ranking and the ACC Atlantic Division title in 2009. That season, Clemson had 21 interceptions, the fifth-most in school history and tied for fifth-most in the nation, and finished seventh in the nation in pass defense.

Before going to Clemson, he spent two seasons at Mississippi State (2007-08), the second of which he worked as defensive coordinator while also coaching safeties. Harbison had two different tenures as an assistant at Alabama (1998-2000, 2003-06), where he coached the Crimson Tide's defensive backs in his initial stay and helped Alabama to the 1999 SEC Championship and appearances in the 1998 Music City Bowl and the 2000 Orange Bowl. Two of his pupils, Fernando Bryant (1999) and Tony Dixon (2000), were taken in the first and second rounds of the NFL Draft, respectively. In his second stint with the Crimson Tide, Harbison worked with the wide receivers and helped Alabama to three bowl appearances.

Between the Alabama assignments, Harbison coached defensive backs at LSU (2001-02) under head coach Nick Saban and helped the Tigers win the 2001 SEC Championship and play in the 2002 Sugar Bowl and 2003 Cotton Bowl. Corey Webster, who played his first season as a cornerback under Harbison, finished second on the school's all-time career interceptions list.

He served as defensive backs coach in his first stop at Clemson (1995-97) as the Tigers played in three consecutive bowl games. At Clemson, Harbison mentored 2018 Hall of Fame inductee and nine-time Pro Bowl selection Brian Dawkins, helping him earn All-America honors while also leading the ACC in interceptions in 1995.

Harbison also coached the secondary at UTEP (1994) and twice worked at his alma mater, Gardner-Webb, coaching wide receivers (1992-93) and defensive backs (1984-85). In addition to his collegiate coaching experience, Harbison worked in both the Arena Football League as defensive coordinator with the Charlotte Rage (1993), and in the World League of American Football with the Raleigh-Durham Skyhawks in 1991 as defensive backs coach.

=== Arizona Cardinals ===
On February 14, 2018, Harbison was hired by the Arizona Cardinals as their assistant defensive backs coach.

== Personal life ==
Harbison graduated with a bachelor's degree in business administration from Gardner–Webb University in 1995. He is married to the former Tammy McCluney, and they have four children (Charlie, Stedman, Masai, Msiba).
