= Nolan Franz =

American football player (born 1959)

No. 84
- Position: Wide receiver

Personal information
- Born: September 11, 1959 (age 67); New Orleans, Louisiana, U.S.
- Listed height: 6 ft 2 in (1.88 m)
- Listed weight: 185 lb (84 kg)

Career information
- High school: East Jefferson
- College: Tulane
- NFL draft: 1982: undrafted

Career history
- Buffalo Bills (1982)*; Boston/New Orleans/Portland Breakers (1983–1985); Green Bay Packers (1986)
- * Offseason or practice squad member only

Career NFL statistics
- Receptions: 1
- Receiving yards: 7
- Stats at Pro Football Reference

Nolan Clarence Franz (born September 11, 1959) is an American former professional football player who was a wide receiver in the National Football League (NFL). After playing in the United States Football League (USFL) for the Boston/New Orleans/Portland Breakers from 1983 to 1985, Franz was a member of the Green Bay Packers of the National Football League (NFL). Franz was born in New Orleans, Louisiana. He played at the college football for the Tulane Green Wave.
