= M. L. Carter =

American football player (born 1955)

No. 42, 24
- Position: Cornerback

Personal information
- Born: December 9, 1955 (age 70); Beaufort, South Carolina, U.S.
- Listed height: 5 ft 9 in (1.75 m)
- Listed weight: 173 lb (78 kg)

Career information
- High school: Monterey (Monterey, California)
- College: Cal State Fullerton; San Jose State
- NFL draft: 1979: undrafted

Career history
- Kansas City Chiefs (1979-1981); Hamilton Tiger-Cats (1982); Boston Breakers (1983)

Awards and highlights
- MPC Hall Of Fame; 1979 Football Digest All-Rookie Team

Career NFL statistics
- Interceptions: 3
- Fumble recoveries: 1
- Stats at Pro Football Reference

Career CFL statistics
- Games played: 1

Milton Louis Carter (born December 9, 1955) is an American former professional football player who was a cornerback for three seasons with the Kansas City Chiefs of the National Football League (NFL). He also played in the Canadian Football League (CFL) and in the United States Football League (USFL). His career ended due to knee injuries. He played college football for the Cal State Fullerton Titans and San Jose State Spartans. Married in 1987 to Beberlyn Carter. Has one biological son, ML Carter Jr, born July 29, 1981.

== Early life and education ==
M. L. Carter was born on December 9, 1955, in Beaufort, South Carolina. He attended Monterey High School. He went to college at Monterey Peninsula Jr College, also, Cal State-Fullerton and at San Jose State.

== Professional career ==
Kansas City Chiefs

Carter first played for the Kansas City Chiefs. In week 11, 1979, he had his first career interception; a 20-yard return. The next week he had two interceptions for 13 yards. Both interceptions were against HOF quarterback, Kenny Stabler. He played in all 16 games in 1979. He played in seven games in 1980 and 10 in 1981.

Hamilton Tiger-Cats

In 1982, he played one game for the Hamilton Tiger-Cats of the Canadian Football League.

Boston Breakers

The next year, he played in 18 games for the Boston Breakers of the USFL. He had one interception.
