= Anthony Steels =

American football player (1959–2017)

No. 45
- Position: Running back

Personal information
- Born: January 8, 1959; Sacramento, California
- Died: March 3, 2017 (aged 57)
- Listed height: 5 ft 9 in (1.75 m)
- Listed weight: 200 lb (91 kg)

Career information
- High school: John W. North (Riverside, California); Jacksonville (Jacksonville, Arkansas); American School (Spain)
- College: Nebraska
- NFL draft: 1983: undrafted

Career history
- Boston Breakers (1983); New Orleans Breakers (1984); San Diego Chargers (1985); Buffalo Bills (1985); San Diego Chargers (1987)
- Stats at Pro Football Reference

William Anthony Steels (January 8, 1959 – March 3, 2017) was an American football running back in the National Football League who played for the Buffalo Bills and San Diego Chargers. He played college football for the Nebraska Cornhuskers. He also played in the USFL for the Boston/New Orleans Breakers.

He died on March 3, 2017.
