= Ben Needham (American football) =

American football player and coach (born 1958)

No. 83, 97, 59
- Position: Linebacker

Personal information
- Born: November 19, 1958 (age 67); Groveport, Ohio
- Listed height: 6 ft 4 in (1.93 m)
- Listed weight: 210 lb (95 kg)

Career information
- High school: Groveport Madison (OH)
- College: Michigan
- NFL draft: 1982: 7th round, 194 (By the Cincinnati Bengals)th overall pick

Career history
- Boston Breakers (1983); New Orleans Breakers (1984); Portland Breakers (1985)

Awards and highlights
- USFL All-League (1983)

Bennett Lee Needham (born November 19, 1958) is an American former football linebacker. He played college football for the University of Michigan from 1978 to 1979 and in 1981 and professional football in the United States Football League (USFL) for the Boston/New Orleans/Portland Breakers from 1983 to 1985. He was selected by the Sporting News as a first-team USFL All-League player in 1983.

== Early life ==
Needham was born on November 19, 1958, in Groveport, Ohio. He attended Groveport Madison High School, graduating in 1977.

== University of Michigan ==
Needham enrolled at the University of Michigan in 1977 and played college football as a linebacker for head coach Bo Schembechler's Michigan Wolverines football teams from 1978 to 1979 and in 1981. In 1978, he started two games at outside linebacker and one at inside linebacker and registered 23 tackles. In 1979, he started 11 games at outside linebacker for Michigan, registering 46 tackles with one pass breakup and one fumble recovery. He was suspended from the team in March 1980. In 1981, he returned to the team and started 10 games at outside linebacker, totaling 71 tackles, two pass breakups, one interception and one fumble recovery.

== Professional football ==
Needham was selected 194th overall by the Cincinnati Bengals in the seventh round of the 1982 NFL draft. He was released by the Bengals in the final round of cuts prior to the start of the 1983 NFL season. He played professional football in the United States Football League (USFL) for the Boston Breakers in 1983, the New Orleans Breakers in 1984 and the Portland Breakers in 1985. In March 1983, he returned a blocked field goal 68 yards for a touchdown against the Denver Gold. He was selected by the Sporting News as a first-team All-League player in 1983. In 1984, he registered 131 tackles and five quarterback sacks.

== Later life ==
Needham later served as the head football coach at his alma mater, Groveport Madison High School, from 1993 to 1998. He compiled a record of 12–36 as head coach.
