= John Walton (American football) =

American football player and coach (born 1947)

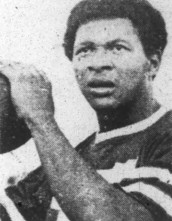
- Walton, circa 1969

No. 10, 11
- Position: Quarterback

Personal information
- Born: October 4, 1947 (age 79); Elizabeth City, North Carolina, U.S.
- Listed height: 6 ft 2 in (1.88 m)
- Listed weight: 210 lb (95 kg)

Career information
- High school: P. W. Moore
- College: Elizabeth City State
- NFL draft: 1969: undrafted

Career history
- Los Angeles Rams (1969–1971)*; Indianapolis Capitols (1969); Chicago Fire (1974); San Antonio Wings (1975); Philadelphia Eagles (1976–1981); Boston / New Orleans Breakers (1983-1984)
- * Offseason or practice squad member only

Awards and highlights
- 1968 All-CIAA team-Quarterback; CFL MVP (1969); All-CFL team (1969); CFL champion (1969); All-WFL team (1975)
- Stats at Pro Football Reference

John Booker Walton (born October 4, 1947) is an American former professional football player and coach. He played professionally as a quarterback in the Continental Football League (CFL), World Football League (WFL), National Football League (NFL), and United States Football League (USFL). Walton played college football at Elizabeth City State University. He served two stints at the head football coach at Elizabeth City State, from 1980 to 1982 and 1989 to 1990, compiling a record of 25–24–2.

In 1969 Walton became the first African-American quarterback to lead a professional football team to a title, when the Indianapolis Capitols defeated the San Antonio Toros 44–38 (OT) in the Continental Football League final.

== College career ==
Walton played college football at Elizabeth City State University in the Central Intercollegiate Athletic Association (CIAA) for four seasons (1965–1968). During his senior year (1968) he completed 114 of 204 passes for 1,400 yards and 16 touchdowns and led the Vikings to an 8–1 record. Walton was honored for his performance by being named to the All-CIAA football team. Walton graduated from Elizabeth City State University in 1969 with a bachelor's degree in physical education.

== Professional playing career ==
=== National Football League (1969-1972) ===
Walton was not drafted coming out of college but was signed as a free agent by the Los Angeles Rams of the National Football League in March 1969. He participated in several preseason games with the Rams in 1969–1972 but was never able to make the active roster during the season and spent most of his time on the taxi squad (practice team).

=== Continental Football League (1969) ===
In 1969, after not making the Los Angeles Rams team, Walton played for the Indianapolis Capitols of the Continental Football League. His first pro football start came on September 2, 1969, when he led the Capitals to a 28–27 victory over the Norfolk Neptunes. Walton led the Capitals to the 1969 Continental Football League championship game (December 13, 1969) where he completed 14 of 30 passes for 217 yards and two touchdowns as Indianapolis defeated the San Antonio Toros in overtime 44–38 to become the 1969 Continental Football League champions. Walton was named to the ALL-CFL team and the MVP of the Capitals team. During the season Walton completed 109 of 234 passes for 1,713 yards and 17 touchdowns.

=== World Football League (1974–1975) ===
In 1974, he served as a backup quarterback for the Chicago Fire of the World Football League. In 1975, he was the starting quarterback for the San Antonio Wings of the World Football League where he led the league in passing yards and touchdowns. Walton was named to the WFL All-Pro team. The World Football League officially suspended operations on October 22, 1975.

=== National Football League (1976–1979) ===
When Dick Vermeil, who had served as the Rams' special teams coach during Walton's first attempt to break into the NFL, was hired as head coach of the Philadelphia Eagles, he invited Walton to participate in a tryout. Vermeil was known to have sought recruits from the WFL, having famously hired Vince Papale under similar circumstances.

Walton was signed to a contract with the Philadelphia Eagles, and from 1976 to 1979 he would serve as a backup quarterback for the Eagles, playing in fifteen games over four seasons before leaving the NFL, at the age of 32, following the conclusion of the 1979 season.

=== United States Football League (1983–1984) ===
In 1983, Walton was convinced by Dick Coury, the head coach of the Boston Breakers of the newly formed United States Football League (USFL), to give quarterbacking one more chance. Coury was familiar with Walton and his talent as Coury had been a coach on the Philadelphia Eagles staff during Walton's time there. Despite being 35 years old, and not having played a down of pro football since 1979, Walton agreed to join the USFL and become the starting quarterback for the 1983 Boston Breakers and the 1984 New Orleans Breakers, after the team moved to New Orleans following the 1983 season. Walton was one of the top passers in the USFL finishing second in the league in 1983 with 3,772 yards passing and third in the league with 20 touchdowns while leading the Breakers to an 11–7 record and a second-place finish in the USFL's Atlantic Division. In 1984, he finished fifth in the league in passing yards with 3,554. Walton owns the USFL record for most passing attempts in a season (589) which was set during the 1983 season.

== Coaching career ==
After leaving the NFL, Walton become head football coach at his alma mater, Elizabeth City State University, on January 15, 1980. He was the head coach from 1980 to 1982 compiling a 20–10–1 overall record (14–7 in the CIAA) He left Elizabeth City State in 1983 to return to pro football as the quarterback of the Boston Breakers. Walton return to Elizabeth City State as head coach in 1989 and remained in that post through the 1990 season.

In 1991, Walton was the offensive coordinator for the Raleigh-Durham Skyhawks of the World League of American Football (WLAF) under head coach Roman Gabriel, who played with Walton on the Rams and Eagles teams in the NFL and was his offensive coordinator for the Portland Breakers in 1985.

== Post-football career ==
Following his retirement from pro football, he returned to Elizabeth City, where he has served as a teacher and a member of the city council.

== ECSU Hall of Fame ==
Walton was elected to the Elizabeth City State University Hall of Fame on October 25, 1985.

== Career statistics ==
  World Football League (WFL)
 
Year    Team               GP  ATT. Comp. Yards  TD  Int.
 1975 San Antonio Wings    12  338  167    2405  19   22

 National Football League (NFL)
 
Year    Team               GP  ATT. Comp. Yards  TD  Int.
 1976 Philadelphia Eagles  3    28   12    125   0   2   
 1978 Philadelphia Eagles  4     1    0    0     0   0  
 1979 Philadelphia Eagles  8    36   19    213   3   1

 United States Football League (USFL)
 
Year    Team               GP  ATT. Comp. Yards  TD  Int.
 1983 Boston Breakers       18 589   330  3772   20   18  
 1984 New Orleans Breakers  18 512   280  3554   17   19

== Head coaching record ==
Year	Team	Overall	Conference	Standing	Bowl/playoffs
Elizabeth City State Vikings (Central Intercollegiate Athletics Association) (1980–1982)
1980	Elizabeth City State	7–2–1	5–2	T–3rd	
1981	Elizabeth City State	8–3	6–1	2nd (Northern)	L NCAA Division Quarterfinal
1982	Elizabeth City State	5–5	3–4	4th (Northern)	
Elizabeth City State Vikings (Central Intercollegiate Athletics Association) (1989–1990)
1989	Elizabeth City State	2–8	0–6	6th (Northern)	
1990	Elizabeth City State	3–6–1	2–4	T–5th (Northern)	
Elizabeth City State:		25–24–2	16–17		
Total:		25–24–2			

== See also ==
- 1983 USFL season
- 1984 USFL season
