= Amelia Boone =

American obstacle racer

Amelia Boone WTM 2012

Amelia Boone (born September 27, 1983) is an American obstacle racer. She used to be an attorney for the law firm of Skadden, Arps, Slate, Meagher & Flom, but now works for Apple Inc. in San Jose, California.

As one of the most accomplished obstacle course racing (OCR) athletes in the history of the sport, she has won both the Spartan Race World Championship (2013) and World's Toughest Mudder (three times 2012, 2014 and 2015). In 2014, she won the WTM title eight weeks after major knee surgery.

She is sponsored by Reebok, BeetElite, RockTape, Sufferfest Beer Company, and Ultimate Direction, and has been featured in a Tough Mudder commercial for Oberto Jerky, alongside sportscaster Stephen A. Smith.

Boone appeared on the cover of the August 2015 issue of Runner's World magazine, which included the article "The Obstacle Course Race Superstar: How Amelia Boone went from hating running to dominating races".

== Education ==
In 2002 Boone graduated from Lakeridge High School in Lake Oswego, Oregon. In 2006 she graduated from Washington University in St. Louis, Missouri, with a degree in anthropology and political science. Then in 2009 she graduated from University of Washington School of Law with a Juris Doctor (J.D.) degree.

== Race history ==
2016

- Sean O'Brien 100k (02.06.16): 2nd place female, 4th place overall

2015

- Rodeo Beach 30k (12.12.15): 1st place female
- World's Toughest Mudder (11.14.15); 1st place female
- Spartan Team Championships (10.31.15): 1st place team
- Spartan Race World Championships (10.3.15): 4th place female
- Tri-State Super Spartan (9.12.15): 1st place female
- Washougal Spartan Sprint (8.8.15): 2nd place female
- Palmerton Spartan Super (7.11.15): 1st place female
- Salt Lake Spartan Super (6.26.15): 1st place female
- Breckenridge Spartan Sprint (6.12.15): 2nd place female
- Monterey Spartan Super (6.6.15) 1st place female
- Indiana Spartan Sprint (5.16.15): 1st place female
- Montana Spartan Sprint (5.10.15): 2nd place female
- Rodeo Beach Rumble 30k (4.25.15): 1st place female; 3rd overall
- Tri-State Spartan Beast (4.18.15); 1st place female
- Georgia Death Race 68 mi (3.15.15); 3rd place female
- XTerra McDowell Mountain 15 mi (2.1.15): 1st place female

2014

- World's Toughest Mudder (11.15 - 11.16.14): 1st place female
- Spartan World Championships (9.20.14): DNS
- Virginia Super Spartan (8.23.14): 1st place female
- Washougal Spartan Sprint (8.3.14): 2nd place female
- Pennsylvania Spartan Sprint (7.12.14): 1st place female
- Tuxedo Spartan Sprint (6.8.14): 1st place female
- Tuxedo Spartan Sprint (6.7.14): 2nd place female
- Mud, Guts & Glory (5.24.14): 1st place female
- Bonefrog Challenge (5.17.14): 1st place female
- Indiana Spartan Sprint (4.26.14): 1st place female
- Las Vegas Super Spartan (4.5.14): 2nd place female
- Charlotte Spartan Sprint (3.23.14): 1st place female
- Atlas Race (2.23.14): 1st place female; 2nd place team
- Tampa Spartan Sprint (2.15.14): 2nd place female

2013

- Spartan Race World Championships (VT Beast) (9.21.13): 1st place female
- Mud Guts and Glory (8.31.13): 1st place female
- Pacific Northwest Spartan Sprint Championship (8.3.2013): 1st place female
- Midwest Super Spartan (7.21.13): 1st place female
- Midwest Super Spartan Championship (7.20.13): 1st place female
- 2013 Peak Death Race (6.21.13): 3rd place female
- Indiana Spartan Sprint (4.27.13): 1st place female
- Las Vegas Super Spartan (4.6.13): 3rd place female

2012

- 2012 World's Toughest Mudder (11.17.12): 1st place female; 2nd place overall
- Midwest Super Spartan (10.27.12): 1st place female
- Vermont Spartan UltraBeast - 2012 Spartan Championship (9.22.12): 2nd place female
- 2012 Peak Death Race (6.15.12): 2nd place female
- Civilian Military Combine - TriState (5.18.12): 1st place overall; 1st place female
- 2012 Winter Death Race (3.2.12): 1st place female; 3rd place overall

2011

- 2011 World's Toughest Mudder (12.16.11): 2nd place female; 11th place overall
