= Lake Oswego School District =

School district in Oregon, United States

Location
- Lake Oswego, Oregon

District information
- Type: Public school district
- Grades: K–12
- Superintendent: Jennifer Schiele

Students and staff
- Students: 6,854

Other information
- Website: https://www.losdschools.org

The Lake Oswego School District (7J) is a public school district serving Lake Oswego, Oregon, United States, a suburb about 7 miles (11 km) south of Portland. The district comprises 10 primary and secondary schools with a total enrollment of 6,854 during the 2022-23 school year.

== History ==
Lakewood School was built in 1928. The school closed in 1979 and the Lakewood Center for the Arts began leasing the building in 1980. The center made its final payment to purchase the building from the school district in 1987.

In 2011, the school board approved the closure of three elementary schools as a cost-saving measure. Palisades Elementary was closed in 2012 and Bryant and Uplands Elementary Schools were closed in 2013. It was estimated that the closures would save the district about $2.3 million a year. After the plan was completed, the former Bryant Elementary building became a part of Lakeridge Junior High School and the district's junior high schools switched to sixth through eighth grade. Sixth grade was previously part of the elementary schools. In 2015, a majority of the former Palisades Elementary building was leased to the Lake Oswego Parks and Recreation Department.

== Racist incidents ==
The Oregonian reported in March 2018 that LOSD schools have faced numerous racist incidents over many years. Students from Lake Oswego Junior High School walked out in protest in February 2018, because following a racist note passing incident. They were frustrated, because this was not the first racist incident.

== Demographics ==
In the 2022-23 school year, 67.9% of students were White, 11.5% Multiracial, 10.5% Asian, 8.9% Hispanic/Latino, 0.8% Black/African American, 0.2% Native Hawaiian/Pacific Islander, and 0.2% American Indian/Alaska Native.

== Boundary ==
Within Clackamas County, the district includes that county's portion of Lake Oswego (the majority of the municipality), plus that county's part of Rivergrove (the majority of the municipality), portions of West Linn, and portions of the Stafford census-designated place.

The district extends into Multnomah County, where it covers other parts of Lake Oswego.

== School Board ==
There are five school board members, each serving four-year terms. In addition, there are two non-voting student representatives.

Position	Name	Term ends
1	John Wallin	2027
2	Neelam Gupta (vice chair)	2029
3	Brian Bills	2029
4	Kate Lupton	2029
5	Kirsten Aird (chair)	2027

== Schools ==
=== High schools ===
- Lake Oswego High School
- Lakeridge High School

=== Middle schools ===
- Lake Oswego Middle School
- Lakeridge Middle School

=== Elementary schools ===
- Forest Hills Elementary
- Hallinan Elementary
- Lake Grove Elementary
- Oak Creek Elementary
- River Grove Elementary
- Westridge Elementary
- Palisades World Language School

=== Charter school ===
- Harmony Academy (grades 9–12)
