= Lakeridge High School =

Public high school in Lake Oswego, Oregon

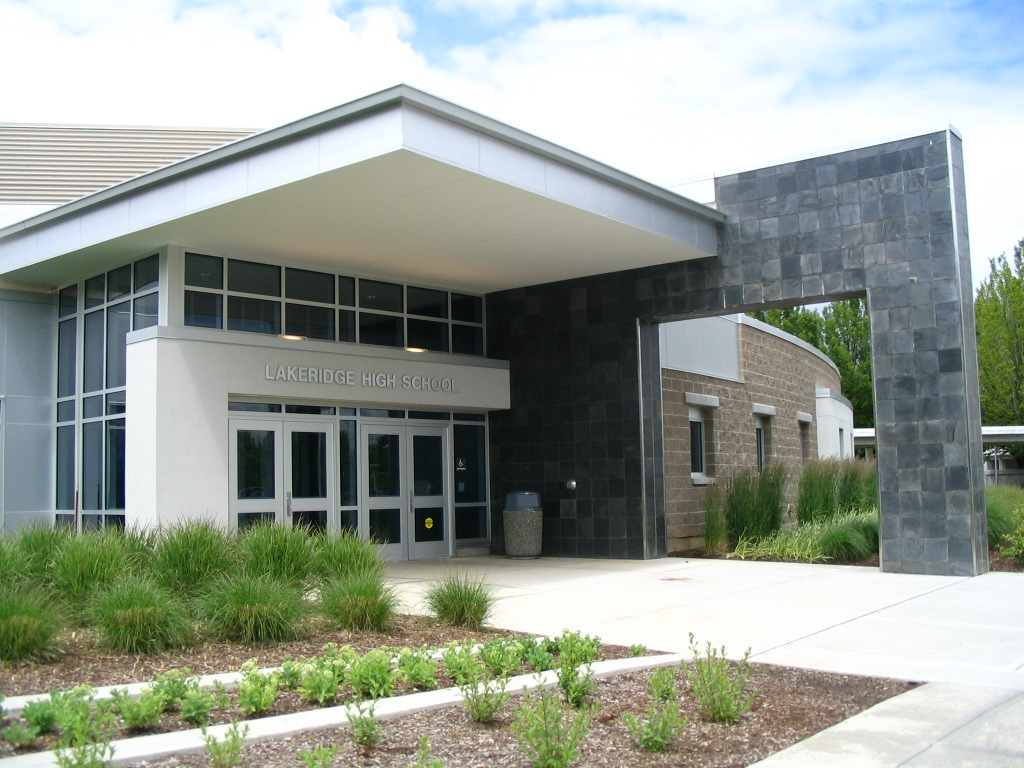

Location
- 1235 Overlook Drive; Lake Oswego, Oregon 97034; United States; 45.397°N 122.694°W

Information
- Type: Public
- Established: 1971
- School district: Lake Oswego School District
- Principal: Kevin Mills
- Teaching staff: 69.51 (on an FTE basis)
- Grades: 9–12
- Enrollment: 1,241 (2024–2025)
- Student to teacher ratio: 17.85
- Campus type: Suburban
- Colors: Columbia Blue and Vegas Gold
- Athletics conference: OSAA 6A-5 Three Rivers League
- Team name: Pacers
- Rivals: Lake Oswego High School
- Newspaper: The Newspacer
- Yearbook: Symposium
- Feeder schools: Lakeridge Middle School
- Website: lhs.losdschools.org

Lakeridge High School (LHS) is a four-year public secondary school in Lake Oswego, Oregon, a suburb south of Portland. The school is within the Lake Oswego School District.

== Academics ==
In 2008, 90% of the school's seniors received a high school diploma. Of 261 students, 234 graduated, 15 dropped out, nine received a modified diploma, and three were still in high school in 2009.

In 2022, 97% of the school's seniors received a high school diploma. Of 321 students, 314 graduated, and 7 dropped out.

In 2023, of 906 AP exams administered at Lakeridge had passing scores that year which 446 Lakeridge students took part in, 82.2% received passing scores. That's a number significantly more than the number of exams that have passing scores nationally, Study.com reports that number is around 60%.

=== Academic awards ===
In 1987, Lakeridge High School was honored in the Blue Ribbon Schools Program, the highest honor a school can receive in the United States.

The school received a silver ranking in U.S. News & World Report's 2010 "America's Best High Schools" survey.

== Athletics ==
Lakeridge high school athletic teams compete in the OSAA 6A-5 Three Rivers League.

State Championships:

- Baseball: 1974, 1999, 2001
- Boys Golf: 1978, 1983, 1984
- Boys Soccer: 1978, 1979†, 1980, 1982, 2004, 2016, 2023
- Boys Swimming: 1995, 2000
- Boys Tennis: 1995
- Cheerleading: 1995
- Football: 1987
- Girls Basketball: 1991
- Girls Golf: 1979, 1980, 1981, 1982, 2000
- Girls Soccer: 1982
- Girls Track and Field: 2013
- Girls Tennis: 2000, 2003, 2004
- Girls Water Polo: 2022, 2023
- Speech: 1987
- Volleyball: 2013
- Lacrosse (non-OSAA): 1997, 1998, 1999, 2001, 2002, 2005, 2006, 2007, 2013, 2025
- Newspaper: 2023

(†=Tied with one or more schools)

== Notable alumni ==
- Marisa Abegg - professional soccer player
- Luke Basso - college football long snapper for the Oregon Ducks
- J. J. Birden - former NFL wide receiver
- Amelia Boone - 4x obstacle racing world champion
- Erin Chambers - actress, played Siobhan on General Hospital
- Travis Cole - former NFL and Arena Football League player
- Steve Coury - former Oregon State All-American wide receiver and current head coach of the Lake Oswego High School football team
- Kevin & Dan Hageman - film/television screenwriters, producers
- Jillian Harmon - collegiate and Olympic basketball player
- Cooper Hummel - MLB outfielder; class of 2013
- C. W. Jensen - retired Portland police captain, TV personality
- Kennedy - former MTV VJ, political satirist
- Cathy Marshall - news anchor
- Sam Martin - singer, songwriter
- Bart Miadich - Major League Baseball pitcher
- Doug Nussmeier - NFL quarterback, college football coach; class of 1989
- Jason Palumbis - football player, Stanford University quarterback; class of 1987
- Erik Wilhelm - NFL quarterback, Cincinnati Bengals; class of 1984
- Yeat - rapper, internet celebrity, songwriter; class of 2018
