= Committee for a Better New Orleans =

U.S. non-profit organization

- Formation: 2000
- Type: community organization advocacy group
- Legal status: 501(c)(3) non-profit
- Purpose: civic improvement
- Region served: New Orleans, Louisiana
- Co-chairs: Damian Clark, Josh Zuckerman
- Executive Director: Nellie Catzen
- Website: www.cbno.org

The Committee for a Better New Orleans is a privately funded community organization and advocacy group in New Orleans, Louisiana, in the United States. It was started in 2000 by Joe Canizaro, a wealthy property developer, and included college presidents and local religious leaders. The group prepared and published a "Blueprint for a Better New Orleans", a plan for improvements to management and infrastructure of the city. The organization has 501(c)(3) non-profit status.
