= Frank Lockett =

American football player (born 1957)

No. 32, 80, 81
- Position: Wide receiver

Personal information
- Born: June 1, 1957 (age 69); Independence, Louisiana, U.S.
- Listed height: 6 ft 0 in (1.83 m)
- Listed weight: 200 lb (91 kg)

Career information
- High school: Richmond (CA) De Anza
- College: Nebraska
- NFL draft: 1979: 10th round, 264th overall pick

Career history
- Green Bay Packers (1979)*; San Francisco 49ers (1980)*; Miami Dolphins (1982)*; Boston/New Orleans/Portland Breakers (1983-1985); San Antonio Gunslingers (1985); Miami Dolphins (1985)
- * Offseason or practice squad member only
- Stats at Pro Football Reference

Frank Arthur Lockett (born June 1, 1957) is an American former professional football wide receiver in the National Football League (NFL).

== Early life ==
He played high school football at De Anza High School in Richmond, California.

== Professional career ==
Lockett was selected by the Green Bay Packers in the tenth round of the 1979 NFL draft. He later played with the Miami Dolphins during the 1985 NFL season. Lockett also played with the Boston/New Orleans/Portland Breakers of the United States Football League in 1983 to 1985.
