= Laz-D =

American rapper with Down syndrome (born 1982)

Laz-D (born Cameron Lasley in 1982) is an American rapper with Down syndrome. His stage name was given to him by NBA basketball player and former classmate Salim Stoudamire. He was introduced to the rap music scene by rap producer Jack Gibson, who later produced and mixed most of the songs on his seminal debut, The Man Himself, at the D Compound. He is known for performing at the "Buddy Walk" every year in Lake Oswego.

== Discography ==
- The Man Himself (2006)
- In My Face (2009)
- Against These Walls (2012) (as Cam Lasley)
