= Lake Oswego High School =

Public school in Lake Oswego, Oregon, United States

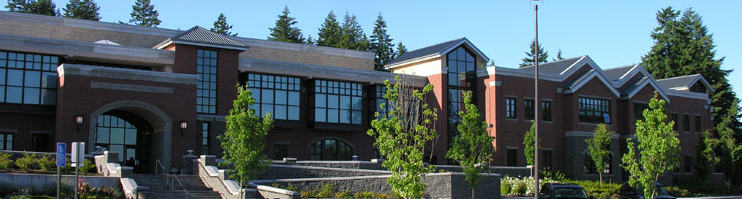

Location
- 2501 Country Club Road; Lake Oswego, (Clackamas County), Oregon 97034; United States; 45°25′36.90″N 122°42′08.59″W

Information
- Type: Public
- Established: 1950
- School district: Lake Oswego School District
- Principal: Kristen Colyer
- Teaching staff: 67.97 (FTE)
- Grades: 9–12
- Enrollment: 1,275 (2023–2024)
- Student to teacher ratio: 18.76
- Campus: Suburban
- Colors: Navy and white
- Athletics conference: OSAA Three Rivers League, Class 6A
- Mascot: Pilot Joe (Sea Farer)
- Team name: Lakers
- Rival: Lakeridge High School
- Newspaper: Lake Views
- Yearbook: Laker Log
- Feeder schools: Lake Oswego Middle School
- Television/radio: Laker Broadcasting
- Website: lohs.losdschools.org

Lake Oswego High School (LOHS) is a public high school in Lake Oswego, Oregon, United States. It is part of the Lake Oswego School District.

== History ==
Lake Oswego High School first opened in September 1951 as a six-year school, with an enrollment of 564. In 1956, it became a four-year high school with the opening of Lake Oswego Junior High School, and in 1958, a three-year high school (with 589 students) as the junior high expanded to include the 9th grade (for a total of 656 students).

In the fall of 2005, construction was finished on a completely new campus. Built over the original school, the new building featured classrooms equipped with built-in projectors and SMART boards. Other improvements included a state-of-the-art 500-seat theater and a building wing designated for art classes.

Several years later, mold and defects in the walls and roof of the school and gym, as a result of faulty construction, were detected. A string of lawsuits ensued between the school district and parties involved with the construction. The district eventually reached a $6.7 million settlement with its primary contractor, Robinson Construction Company, and several smaller settlements with sub-contractors. Repair work to fix the school's structural problems was completed in 2012.

In 2012, Bruce Plato announced his retirement after 11 years as principal of Lake Oswego High School. The School Board elected Assistant Principal Cindy Schubert as his replacement, effective in the 2013-2014 school year. The current principal is Kristen Colyer.

== Academics ==
In 1983, Lake Oswego High School was honored in the Blue Ribbon Schools Program, the highest honor a school can receive in the United States.

In 2008, 94% of the school's seniors received a high school diplomas. Of 314 students, 294 graduated, 15 dropped out, four received a modified diploma, and one was still in high school in 2009.

The school received a gold ranking in U.S. News & World Report's 2013 "America's Best High Schools". It was named as the second best high school in the state. A gold ranking connotes that the school was among the 500 best in the nation. According to the report, 58 percent of the students participated in AP courses in 2013.

== Notable alumni ==
- Terry Bean - pioneering gay rights activist, founder of Human Rights Campaign and the Gay & Lesbian Victory Fund
- Jori Chisholm (1993) - champion bagpiper
- Kari Chisholm (1991) - political consultant
- Santo Condorelli (2013) - Canadian competitive swimmer
- Brett Elliott (2000) - arena football player
- Farnaz Fassihi (1988) - journalist, The New York Times, The Wall Street Journal; author of Waiting for An Ordinary Day
- Mohammad Ashraf Ghani (1967) - former president of Afghanistan; was listed in yearbooks under the names Ashraf Ahmad and Ashraf Ahmad Zai. The American Field Service sponsored his foreign exchange stay. He served on the student council.
- Karl Glusman (2006) - actor, Nocturnal Animals
- Elijah Greer (2009) - NCAA champion for track and field (2013)
- Connor Griffin - assistant coach for the Brooklyn Nets
- Bill Hanzlik (1973-1975) - former NBA player for the Seattle SuperSonics and Denver Nuggets
- Alexandra Jamieson (1993) - author of The Great American Detox Diet, appeared in the film Super Size Me
- Michael Jones - Internet entrepreneur, investor, and former CEO of Myspace
- Benjamin Kim (2001) - concert pianist and winner of the 55th ARD International Music Competition
- Laz-D - rapper
- Neil Lomax (1977) - former NFL quarterback for the St. Louis Cardinals (now Arizona Cardinals)
- Kevin Love (2007) - basketball forward for the Utah Jazz
- Gabe Miller (2006) - football player, linebacker for the Chicago Bears of the National Football League
- Marissa Neitling (2002) - actress, The Last Ship
- Julianne Phillips (1978) - model and actress
- Don Schollander (1964) - Olympic swimmer
- Tiger Shanks (2020) - CFL football player
- Tim Solso (1965) - chairman of Cummins Engine Co.
- Katy Steding (1986) - Olympic basketball player
- Salim Stoudamire (2001) - NBA player, Atlanta Hawks
- John Strong - lead Major League Soccer play-by-play television announcer for Fox Sports
- Mike Stutes (2004) - relief pitcher for the Philadelphia Phillies
- Ben Sullivan (2002) - basketball player and assistant coach for the Boston Celtics
- Wynne (2015) - rapper
