= Joseph C. Canizaro =

American businessman and philanthropist (1937–2025)

- Born: 1937; Baltimore, Maryland. U.S.
- Died: June 20, 2025 (aged 88); Metairie, Louisiana, U.S.
- Occupation: Commercial real estate developer
- Known for: President and Chief Executive Officer of Columbus Properties, L.P., founder of First Bank and Trust, New Orleans former owner of New Orleans Breakers football franchise (1983–1986)
- Spouse(s): Sue Ellen Canizaro, née Mattina
- Children: 2 daughters

Joseph C. Canizaro (1937 – June 20, 2025) was an American commercial real estate developer and philanthropist. Throughout the latter half of the 20th century, Canizaro developed several buildings that make up the New Orleans skyline. In 2005, Canizaro was described as the "single most influential business executive from New Orleans". Canizaro made substantial philanthropic donations to Catholic churches, colleges and universities located in New Orleans and on the Mississippi Gulf Coast. He was the former owner of the New Orleans Breakers football franchise.

== Early years ==
Joseph Canizaro was the son of Dr. Vito Canizaro, a Biloxi surgeon (died 1954), and Gilda Melone Canizaro (died 1990). He was the oldest of eight siblings and grew up in Biloxi. He graduated from Notre Dame High School in Biloxi; although he attended several colleges, he did not receive a degree. In 1961, Canizaro married Sue Ellen Mattina, and the couple moved to New Orleans in 1964.

== Career ==
=== New Orleans businessman and developer ===
Notable New Orleans high-rise developments by Canizaro have included:

- The 22-story Lykes Center completed in 1966, which became the Loews Hotel.
- Canal Place, completed in 1979.
- Texaco Center, completed in 1983.
- Holiday Inn Crowne Plaza, completed in 1984.
- LL&E Tower, completed in 1987. The LL&E Tower later became the First Bank and Trust Tower when, in 1991, Canizaro founded First Bank and Trust of New Orleans, which was housed in the tower.

=== Sports ===
In 1983, Canizaro purchased the USFL's New Orleans Breakers football team. Over 3 seasons, the team played under three names – Boston Breakers (1983), New Orleans Breakers (1984), and Portland Breakers (1985). Because of their inability to televise fall football games in competition with the NFL, USFL teams lost millions of dollars in revenue. Consequently, Canizaro folded his franchise in 1986.

=== Tradition community development ===
In the late 1990s, Canizaro purchased from International Paper Company approximately 4,900 acres (2,000 ha) of mostly forested land located in central Harrison County, Mississippi. On that land, Canizaro began developing Tradition – a planned community located approximately 17 miles (27 km) north of Biloxi, off Mississippi Highway 67. When fully developed, Tradition is projected to cover 4,900 acres (2,000 ha) and contain 15,000 residential units. Tradition has been described as "Mississippi's first master planned community".

As of 2023, Canizaro's health corridor (medical city) developments in association with Tradition, have included:

- William Carey University Tradition campus – anchor for "Tradition Medical City", opened in 2009.
- School of Pharmacy at William Carey University Tradition campus, opened in 2018.
- Bryant Center School of Nursing & Simulation Lab – Opened in 2018 as part of Mississippi Gulf Coast Community College.
- The National Diabetes and Obesity Research Institute – Established in 2015 in association with the Cleveland Clinic, local and regional health facilities, educational institutions, and governmental agencies.
- Vito J. Canizaro Mississippi Veterans Home – Groundbreaking for the $64 million 100-bed facility was held in 2019. Ribbon cutting for the completed facility took place on April 11, 2025.

== Public service ==
- Trustee and past Chairman of the Urban Land Institute
- Member of Tulane University President's Council
- Founder of the Committee for a Better New Orleans
- Advisory Committee on Real Estate Development at Harvard University Graduate School of Design
- On the Board of Ave Maria University in Naples, Florida as Trustee Emeritus
- Member of Mississippi Gulf Coast Community College (MGCCC) Foundation Board

== Philanthropy ==
To manage his philanthropic endeavors, Canizaro set up a nonprofit Donum Dei Foundation in New Orleans in 1993. Select donations in support of educational institutions and health care facilities have included:

- Canizaro Center for Catholic Studies at Loyola University New Orleans.
- Joseph Canizaro and James Livingston Center for Environmental Informatics at the University of New Orleans.
- Benefactor to Neuroscience Center of Excellence LSU Health Sciences Center New Orleans.
- Donated property on which the MGCCC Bryant Center nursing facility was constructed in the Tradition community.
- Established endowed scholarships available to students at MGCCC.

== Death ==
Canizaro died on June 20, 2025, at the age of 88. He was interred in Metairie Cemetery.

== Honors and awards ==
- Honorary Doctorate from Our Lady of Holy Cross College, New Orleans
- Recipient of the Golden Plate Award from the American Academy of Achievement (1980) and host of the 1982 Achievement Summit in New Orleans
- Mayor's Medal of Honor (1999), New Orleans
- Louisiana Italian-American Sports Hall of Fame Award
- Honorary Doctorate from Notre Dame Seminary.
- Recipient of 2019 MGCCC Hornsby Award
