= Richard Crump =

American gridiron football player (born 1955)

Profile
- Position: Running back

Personal information
- Born: February 28, 1955 (age 71); Cairo, Georgia, U.S.

Career information
- College: Northeast Oklahoma
- NFL draft: 1978: 12th round, 309th overall pick

Career history
- 1975–1979: Winnipeg Blue Bombers
- 1979: Calgary Stampeders
- 1979–1981: Ottawa Rough Riders
- 1983: Boston Breakers (USFL)
- 1984: New Orleans Breakers
- 1985: Orlando Renegades

Awards and highlights
- CFL East All-Star (1980)

Richard Crump (born February 28, 1955) is a former Canadian Football League (CFL) running back who played for three different teams from 1975 through 1981. For his career, Crump finished with 3,854 yards rushing and 200 pass receptions. Crump played in the USFL from 1983 through 1985 with the Boston Breakers, New Orleans Breakers and Orlando Renegades where he rushed for 1,167 yards. Crump led the Breakers in 1983 with 990 yards rushing.
