= Portland Breakers =

Former American football team based out of New Orleans, Louisiana and Portland, Oregon

- Established 1982; Folded 1985; Played in Civic Stadium in Portland, Oregon

League/conference affiliations
- United States Football League (1983–1985): Eastern Conference (1984); Western Conference (1985); Atlantic Division (1983); Southern Division (1984)
- Current uniform
- Team colors: Breaker Blue, Royal Blue, Silver, White

Personnel
- Owner(s): 1983 George Matthews and Randy Vataha; 1984 Joseph Canizaro, Neal Kaye Sr. and Randy Vataha; 1985 Joseph Canizaro
- Head coach: 1983–1985 Dick Coury (25-29)

Team history
- Boston Breakers (1983); New Orleans Breakers (1984); Portland Breakers (1985)

Championships
- League championships (0)
- Conference championships (0)
- Division championships (0)

Home stadium(s)
- Nickerson Field (1983); Louisiana Superdome (1984); Civic Stadium (1985)

The Portland Breakers were an American football team that played in the United States Football League (USFL) in the mid-1980s. Before moving to Portland, Oregon, the franchise was previously in Boston, Massachusetts as the Boston Breakers and New Orleans, Louisiana as the New Orleans Breakers.

A new United States Football League – legally distinct from its predecessor, but using its team nicknames – was started in April 2022. A new version of the New Orleans Breakers was one of eight teams competing. On December 19, 2023, the USFL informed its players union that the Breakers would not be among four USFL teams to be contracted as part of the league's upcoming merger with the XFL.

== History ==
=== Boston Breakers ===
The team started out in 1983 as the Boston Breakers, owned by Boston businessman George Matthews and former New England Patriots wide receiver Randy Vataha. However, finding a stadium proved difficult. The lack of a professional-quality stadium had stymied previous attempts at pro football in Boston before the Patriots arrived in 1960.

The largest stadium in the region was Schaefer Stadium in Foxborough, home of the Patriots. However, it was owned by the Sullivan family, owners of the Patriots, and Matthews and Vataha were not willing to have an NFL team as their landlord. As a result, their initial choice for a home facility was Harvard Stadium, but Harvard University rejected them almost out of hand. They finally settled on Nickerson Field on the campus of Boston University, which seated only 21,000 people – the smallest stadium in the league. The team's cheerleaders were called "Heartbreakers".

Coach Dick Coury put together a fairly competitive team led by quarterback Johnnie Walton (then 36 years old, a former Continental Football League and World Football League alumnus who had been out of football since the late 1970s) and Canadian Football League veteran halfback Richard Crump. The Breakers finished 11–7, finishing one game behind the Chicago Blitz for the final playoff spot. Walton, who had retired from pro football years earlier and had spent the previous three years coaching college football, was the league's seventh ranked passer. Coury was named coach of the year.

Despite fielding a fairly solid team, playing in Nickerson Field doomed the team in Boston. The stadium had been built in 1915 as Braves Field and had not aged well. It was so small that the Breakers lost money even when they sold out as visiting teams got a portion of the gate proceeds. The Breakers and Washington Federals were the only teams to draw fewer than 14,000 per game in 1983. The other 10 teams drew over 18,000 per game. (The fans who came to the games were generally passionate; the documentary Small Potatoes: Who Killed the USFL? made note of a particular Breakers victory in which fans stormed the field afterward.)

Concluding that Nickerson Field was not suitable even for temporary use, Matthews again approached Harvard, but the school refused again. He then hashed out a deal to move to Foxborough, but ultimately decided against being a tenant of an NFL team. He considered an offer to sell a stake in the team to Jacksonville, Florida businessman Fred Bullard, but pulled out after Bullard proposed firing Coury in favor of Florida State coach Bobby Bowden. (Bullard would ultimately land an expansion franchise, the Jacksonville Bulls.) After floating offers to move to Seattle, Honolulu, and Portland, Matthews decided to move to New Orleans. He sold a 31 percent interest to New Orleans real estate developer Joe Canizaro, and the move was approved by the USFL on October 18, 1983. Matthews later sold his remaining stake to Canizaro, but Vataha remained as team president.

=== New Orleans Breakers ===
In New Orleans, the team played in the Louisiana Superdome, also home to the NFL's New Orleans Saints. They started out the season 5–0, and all signs pointed to them running away with the Southern Division. However, they only won three more games to finish 8–10. This included a 35–0 thrashing by the Philadelphia Stars and losses in their last six games, a skid fittingly capped off with an embarrassment by the Washington Federals in the season finale. In spite of adding NFL star tight end Dan Ross and rookie halfbacks Buford Jordan and Marcus Dupree (whose signing was technically against USFL rules as he was underage), the team struggled. Walton was inconsistent and ultimately retired after the season, while Dupree would experience constant problems with his knees throughout his time with the Breakers.

Years later, defensive lineman Jeff Gaylord recalled that the Breakers' slide came because many of his teammates were sucked into New Orleans' drug culture. According to Gaylord, cocaine use ran rampant in the locker room, and its lure was too strong for many of his teammates who had grown up poor.

On the positive side, New Orleans supported the team well, averaging 30,557 per game. Many of them came to see Dupree, who grew up in neighboring Mississippi. Jordan ran for 1,276 yards (fourth in the league), and Ross and wide receiver Frank Lockett had strong years.

After the season, league owners decided to go for broke and move to a fall schedule starting in 1986. This put teams like New Orleans, Michigan, and Philadelphia in an awkward situation. Canizaro believed he could not hope to compete directly with the Saints, even though the Breakers were one of the few USFL teams that could have potentially run their NFL rivals out of town. At the time, the Saints were mired in decades-long mediocrity, having only managed to get to .500 twice in their history. Then-owner John W. Mecom Jr. was looking to sell or move the team. However, rather than play a lame-duck spring 1985 season in New Orleans, Canizaro opted to move the team for the second time in as many years.

Tommy Lister Jr. attempted to cross over into football after a successful track and field career at California State University, Los Angeles; he played the 1984 preseason with the team but failed to make the regular season roster. Lister then returned to Los Angeles, where he pursued an acting and professional wrestling career.

==== 1984 New Orleans Breakers schedule ====
Week	Date	Opponent	Result	Record	Venue	Attendance
Preseason
1	Bye					
2	Bye					
3	February 11	at Birmingham Stallions	L 10–30	0–1	Legion Field	12,000
4	February 18	vs. Memphis Showboats	W 20–0	1–1	Cajun Field	
Regular season
1	February 26	at San Antonio Gunslingers	W 13–10	1–0	Alamo Stadium	18,233
2	March 4	at Oakland Invaders	W 13–0	2–0	Oakland–Alameda County Coliseum	41,200
3	March 12	Memphis Showboats	W 37–14	3–0	Louisiana Superdome	45,269
4	March 19	at Jacksonville Bulls	W 38–9	4–0	Gator Bowl Stadium	48,303
5	March 25	Chicago Blitz	W 41–35 (OT)	5–0	Louisiana Superdome	43,692
6	April 2	at Birmingham Stallions	L 17–31	5–1	Legion Field	28,100
7	April 8	Pittsburgh Maulers	W 27–24	6–1	Louisiana Superdome	39,315
8	April 16	Tampa Bay Bandits	L 13–35	6–2	Louisiana Superdome	35,634
9	April 22	Denver Gold	W 20–18	7–2	Louisiana Superdome	22,139
10	April 27	at Philadelphia Stars	L 0–35	7–3	Veterans Stadium	34,011
11	May 7	Arizona Wranglers	L 13–28	7–4	Louisiana Superdome	22,937
12	May 13	Michigan Panthers	W 10–3	8–4	Louisiana Superdome	21,053
13	May 20	at Tampa Bay Bandits	L 20–31	8–5	Tampa Stadium	42,592
14	May 27	Birmingham Stallions	L 14–31	8–6	Louisiana Superdome	23,748
15	June 1	at Memphis Showboats	L 17–20	8–7	Liberty Bowl Memorial Stadium	31,198
16	June 10	at New Jersey Generals	L 21–31	8–8	Giants Stadium	23,114
17	June 15	Jacksonville Bulls	L 17–20 (OT)	8–9	Louisiana Superdome	21,233
18	June 24	at Washington Federals	L 17–20	8–10	RFK Stadium	6,386

=== Portland Breakers ===
Searching for a home, Canizaro considered moving to Sacramento and Columbus, and even weighed merging with the Birmingham Stallions. However, he was particularly intrigued when he visited Portland. It was a fairly large market with a reasonably adequate facility by USFL standards, Civic Stadium (which seated 32,000 people at the time). The move to Portland was announced on November 13, 1984. It marked a return home of sorts for Coury, who had led the World Football League's Portland Storm in 1974. Initially, Portland seemed to welcome the Breakers with open arms. The Breakers sold 6,000 of its highest-priced tickets within twelve hours.

On the field the team struggled, as the strain of playing in three cities in three years finally caught up with them. The team opted to go with former Jacksonville starter Matt Robinson, made expendable when the Bulls acquired Brian Sipe from the New Jersey Generals, as Walton's replacement, rather than seeking a more proven USFL quarterback without a home, like Craig Penrose, Alan Risher, or Mike Hohensee, or trading for someone like Oakland's Fred Besana, or even signing an NFL veteran. Robinson, who failed to displace established starters Richard Todd (New York Jets) and Craig Morton (Denver Broncos) in the NFL, ultimately proved to be a less-than-adequate replacement for Walton, finishing with a 62.6 QB rating. Halfback Jordan had another strong year with over 800 yards gained, as did Lockett. However, their season effectively ended when Dupree suffered a season-ending knee injury in the season opener. While they managed to upend four playoff teams, they never recovered from a six-game losing streak and finished 6–12, going 0-9 on the road.

The Breakers were one of nine teams slated to play in the USFL's first fall season and were slated to be one of only two teams west of the Mississippi River. However, they had only drawn 19,919 per game, not enough to break even. This was partly because Civic Stadium was in an area of downtown with little parking (a stop on the MAX Light Rail line would not open for another decade). With such meager attendance, meeting payroll became an adventure. At one point midway through the season, the players were only paid every other week. With four games to go, the checks stopped coming altogether. They were forced to waive their entire roster after missing their final payroll. Coury later recalled that he and his staff never got paid the full salaries stipulated in their contracts.

After talks to merge with other teams failed, Canizaro folded the franchise while the USFL's antitrust suit against the NFL was underway, citing over $17 million in losses over three years. It had been obvious even before Canizaro folded the franchise that the Breakers would never play another down.

Canizaro was the only league owner who moved his team twice and both moves were long distance. There was some discussion of transplanting the Denver Gold organization to Portland, but this idea was abandoned as the Gold (whose owners opposed moving to the fall) instead merged with the Jacksonville Bulls. The entire league suspended operations not long after, when it was awarded only three dollars in damages.

The Breakers had the distinction of being the only team to play for the entire duration of the USFL for three cities, each season in a different city without relocating mid-season. Unlike many USFL teams, the Breakers never changed its name, logo, or colors when it relocated.

==== 1985 Portland Breakers schedule ====
Week	Date	Opponent	Result	Record	Venue	Attendance
Preseason
1	Bye					
2	February 9	vs. Denver Gold	L 9–27	0–1	Pomona, California	
3	February 16	vs. Los Angeles Express	L 17–38	0–2	John Shepard Stadium, Los Angeles Pierce College, Los Angeles, California	5,500
Regular season
1	February 24	at Arizona Outlaws	L 7–9	0–1	Sun Devil Stadium	20,351
2	March 2	Los Angeles Express	W 14–10	1–1	Civic Stadium	25,232
3	March 10	at Denver Gold	L 17–29	1–2	Mile High Stadium	17,870
4	March 16	Orlando Renegades	W 23–17	2–2	Civic Stadium	25,885
5	March 24	at Houston Gamblers	L 20–27	2–3	Houston Astrodome	22,031
6	April 1	San Antonio Gunslingers	L 0–33	2–4	Civic Stadium	19,882
7	April 6	Oakland Invaders	W 30–17	3–4	Civic Stadium	23,388
8	April 14	at New Jersey Generals	L 7–34	3–5	Giants Stadium	38,245
9	April 21	at Baltimore Stars	L 17–26	3–6	Byrd Stadium	14,832
10	April 27	at Los Angeles Express	L 12–17	3–7	Los Angeles Memorial Coliseum	8,410
11	May 6	Houston Gamblers	L 7–45	3–8	Civic Stadium	18,457
12	May 11	at Birmingham Stallions	L 0–14	3–9	Legion Field	28,500
13	May 19	Arizona Outlaws	L 21–30	3–10	Civic Stadium	15,275
14	May 25	Memphis Showboats	W 17–14	4–10	Civic Stadium	16,682
15	June 2	at Oakland Invaders	L 20–38	4–11	Oakland-Alameda County Coliseum	12,740
16	June 8	Tampa Bay Bandits	W 27–24	5–11	Civic Stadium	15,521
17	June 14	Denver Gold	W 23–17	6–11	Civic Stadium	18,953
18	June 23	at San Antonio Gunslingers	L 13–21	6–12	Alamo Stadium	19,603

=== Top "name" players ===
Among the top "name" Breakers players were: linebacker Marcus Marek; halfbacks Marcus Dupree and Buford Jordan; quarterbacks Johnnie Walton and Matt Robinson; kicker Tim Mazzetti; punter Jeff Gossett; offensive tackle Broderick Thompson; and tight end Dan Ross.

=== Coaches and executives ===
Coury was the team's coach for all three seasons. He was no stranger to Portland, having coached the Storm of the World Football League in 1974. Defensive coordinator was the late Pokey Allen who would later take Portland State University to two national championship games. Division I journeyman Bob Shaw who was hired after leaving Lou Holtz's staff at the University of Arkansas and served in both New Orleans and Portland. The offensive coordinator during the 1983 season was College Football Hall of Fame and former NFL Most Valuable Player Roman Gabriel. After the 1984 season, Jim Fassel was hired as offensive coordinator, but after five months on the job, he left to become head coach at the University of Utah. In 1985, the offensive coordinator was Pete Kettela, a former head coach of the Edmonton Eskimos. Allen would hire former Breaker executive Steven "Dream" Weaver as his marketing director and whose publicity stunts raised his Portland State teams to national acclaim. The team president for the Portland Breakers was John Ralston, who was also a founder of the USFL. Other executives included Jack Galmiche, John Brunelle, and Brian Feldman. Feldman was the only executive who worked in all three cities.

== Single-season leaders ==
- Rushing Yards: 1,296 (1984), Buford Jordan
- Receiving Yards: 1,189 (1984), Frank Lockett
- Passing Yards: 3,772 (1983), Johnnie Walton

== Season-by-season ==
Season records
Season	W	L	T	Finish	Playoff results
Boston Breakers
1983	11	7	0	2nd Atlantic	--
New Orleans Breakers
1984	8	10	0	3rd EC Southern	--
Portland Breakers
1985	6	12	0	5th WC	--
Totals	25	29	0		

== Head coaches ==
- Dick Coury (1983–1985)
