= United States Football League =

American football league (1983–1986)

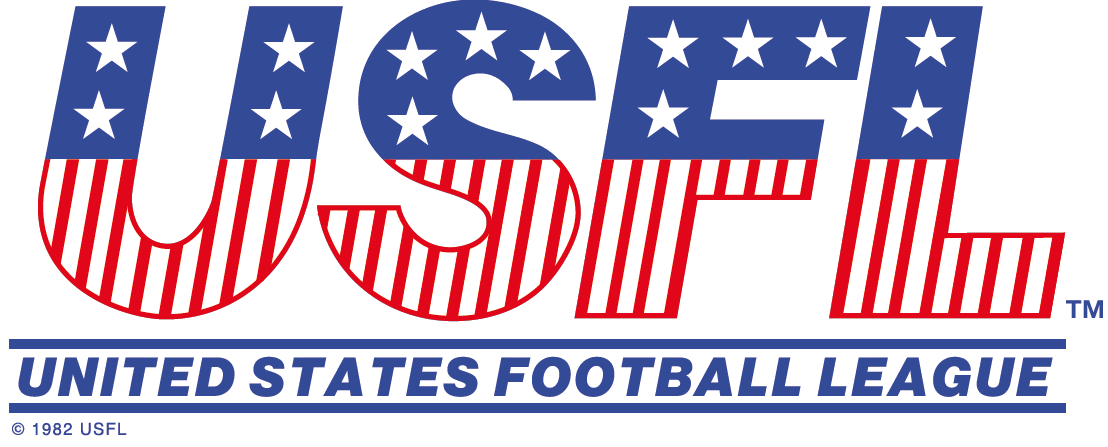
- Sport: American football
- Founded: 1982
- First season: 1983
- Folded: 1986
- No. of teams: 18
- Country: United States
- Last champion: Baltimore Stars

The United States Football League (USFL) was a professional American football league that played for three seasons, 1983 through 1985. The league played a spring/summer schedule in each of its active seasons. The 1986 season was scheduled to be played in the autumn/winter, directly competing against the long-established National Football League (NFL). However, the USFL ceased operations before that season was scheduled to begin.

The ideas behind the USFL were conceived in 1965 by New Orleans businessman David Dixon, who saw a market for a professional football league that would play in the summer, when the National Football League and college football were in their off-season. Dixon had been a key player in the construction of the Louisiana Superdome and the expansion of the NFL into New Orleans in 1967. He developed "The Dixon Plan"—a blueprint for the USFL based upon securing NFL-caliber stadiums in top television markets, securing a national television broadcast contract, and controlling spending—and found investors willing to buy in.

Though the original franchise owners and founders of the USFL had promised to abide by the general guidelines set out by Dixon's plan, problems arose before the teams took the field, with some franchises facing financial problems and instability from the beginning. Due to pressure from the NFL, some franchises had difficulty securing leases in stadiums that were also used by NFL teams, forcing them to scramble to find alternative venues in their chosen city or hurriedly move to a new market. The USFL had no hard salary cap, and because of this, some teams quickly escalated player payrolls to unsustainable levels despite pledges to keep costs under control. While a handful of USFL franchises abided by the Dixon Plan and were relatively stable, others suffered repeated financial crises, and there were many franchise relocations, mergers, and ownership changes during the league's short existence; however, none of its teams actually folded during any given season. These problems were worsened as some owners began engaging in bidding wars for star players against NFL teams and each other, forcing other owners to do the same or face a competitive disadvantage.

On the field, the USFL was regarded as a relatively good product. Many coaches and team executives had NFL experience, and many future top NFL players and coaches got their start in the new league, including several who were later inducted into the Pro Football Hall of Fame and/or the College Football Hall of Fame. The Michigan Panthers won the first USFL championship in 1983. The Philadelphia Stars won the second USFL championship in 1984, and after relocating to Baltimore, won the final USFL championship in 1985 as the Baltimore Stars in what was effectively a rematch of the first USFL title game.

In August 1984, the USFL voted to move from a spring to a fall schedule in 1986 to compete directly with the NFL. This was done at the urging of New Jersey Generals majority owner Donald Trump and a handful of other owners as a way to force a merger between the leagues. As part of this strategy, the USFL filed an antitrust lawsuit against the National Football League in 1986, and a jury ruled that the NFL had violated anti-monopoly laws. However, in a victory in name only, the USFL was awarded a judgment of just $1, which under antitrust laws, was tripled to $3. This court decision effectively ended the USFL's existence. The league never played its planned 1986 season, and by the time it folded, it had lost over $163 million (equivalent to $390 million in 2024 dollars).

== Talent level ==
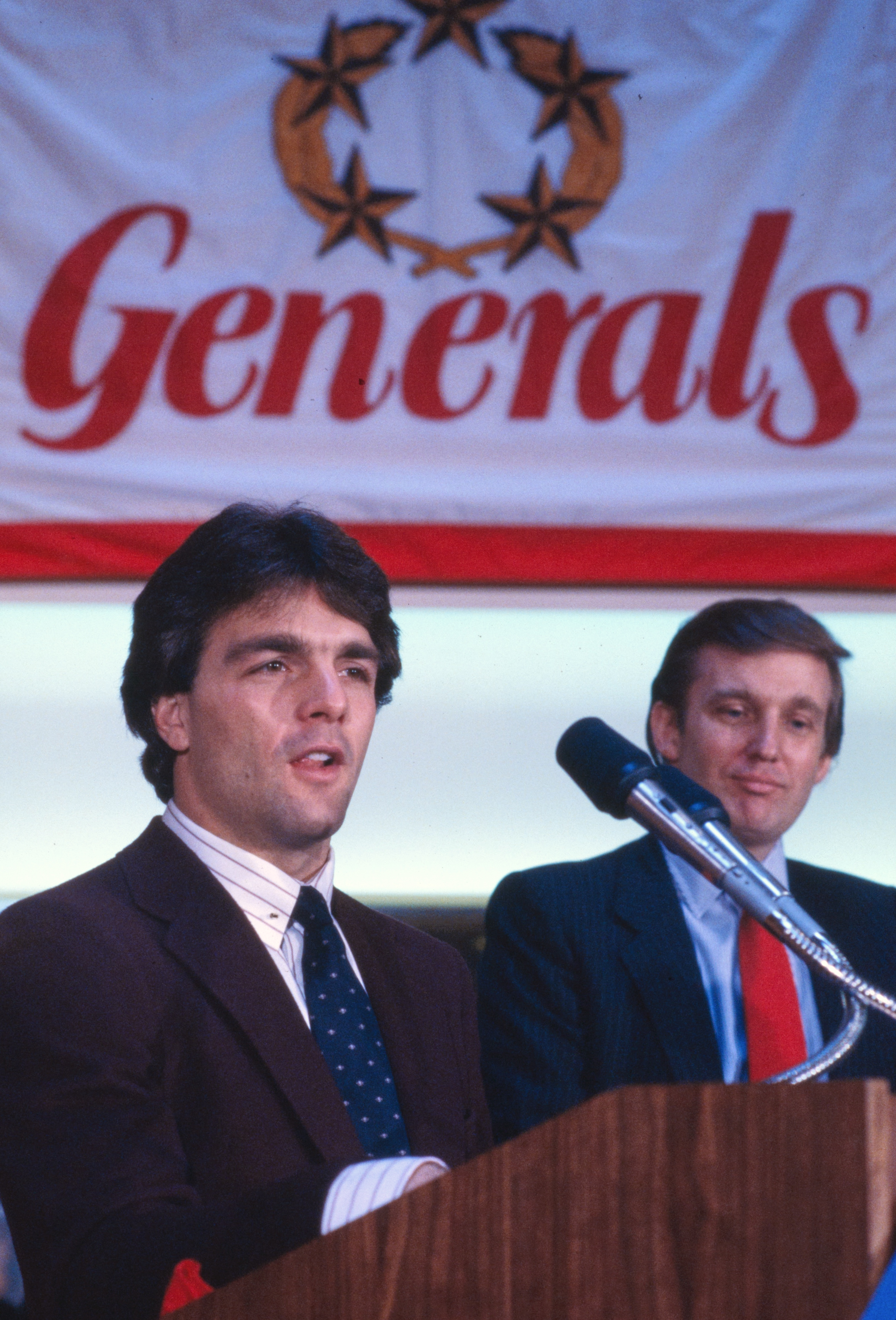
Doug Flutie and Donald Trump at a New Jersey Generals football press conference in February 1985

Three consecutive Heisman Trophy winners signed with USFL teams directly out of college: Georgia running back Herschel Walker (1982) and Boston College quarterback Doug Flutie (1984) signed with the New Jersey Generals, and Nebraska running back Mike Rozier (1983) signed with the Pittsburgh Maulers.

Five future Pro Football Hall of Fame members began their careers in the USFL, including defensive end Reggie White of the University of Tennessee (Memphis Showboats), quarterback Steve Young of Brigham Young University and offensive tackle Gary Zimmerman of the University of Oregon (Los Angeles Express), quarterback Jim Kelly of the University of Miami (Houston Gamblers), and linebacker Sam Mills of Montclair State (Philadelphia Stars).

The USFL also lured in NFL starters, including a handful in the prime of their careers including 1980 NFL MVP, Cleveland Browns' quarterback Brian Sipe, Buffalo Bills' three-time Pro Bowl running back Joe Cribbs and Kansas City Chiefs' three-time Pro Bowl safety Gary Barbaro. Certain NFL backups such as quarterbacks Chuck Fusina and Cliff Stoudt, G Buddy Aydelette, and WR Jim Smith had limited success in the NFL but became major stars in the USFL. Many NFL backups, however, struggled or never made it in the USFL.

== History ==
=== Background ===
For many decades after its inception, American football was widely regarded as a second-tier sport behind baseball, which was long-regarded as America's national pastime. As a result, even the elite levels of American football generally lacked both the financial wherewithal to build their own facilities and the political clout to secure significant public funds for ballpark construction, and as such were compelled to play primarily in venues hastily re-purposed for football. However, since gridiron football in particular is responsible for excessive wear and tear on a natural grass playing field, baseball clubs were not keen to see football played in their parks throughout the key latter months of the baseball season. Thus, the need to use ballparks played a large part in ensuring that the National Football League and early rivals would delay the start of their seasons until September when the baseball season was winding down, thus affording baseball teams the exclusive use of their facilities in the spring and summer.

Starting in the 1950s, a number of technological changes and trends eventually caused some to question the traditional timing of the American football season. In particular, as football became a much more lucrative sport, the invention of artificial turf and developments in the growth and maintenance of natural grass in the 1960s made it more practical for baseball and football to be played at elite levels in the same facility at the same time of year, and the increasing influence of television combined with the prevalence of a farm system in which Major League Baseball controlled the rights to baseball levels in all levels of play caused many minor league baseball clubs (some of whom played in large facilities that could be easily re-purposed for major league football) to be much less lucrative in their own right. Finally, the growing popularity of college football in the 20th century (which also played a fall season to coincide with the fall semester) led to the construction and expansion of dozens of large stadiums for collegiate teams, which were mostly football-specific or at least designed primarily for football, and were primarily in cities without professional football franchises.

It was in this environment, in 1965, that David Dixon, a New Orleans antiques dealer, who would be instrumental in bringing the New Orleans Saints (and building their current home stadium, the Superdome) to his hometown, began to envision football as a possible spring and summer sport as a rival to the dominant fall-schedule NFL.

This was not the first time the United States Football League name was used; there had been a previous, short lived attempt in 1945 to start up a league with that name.

=== Organization ===
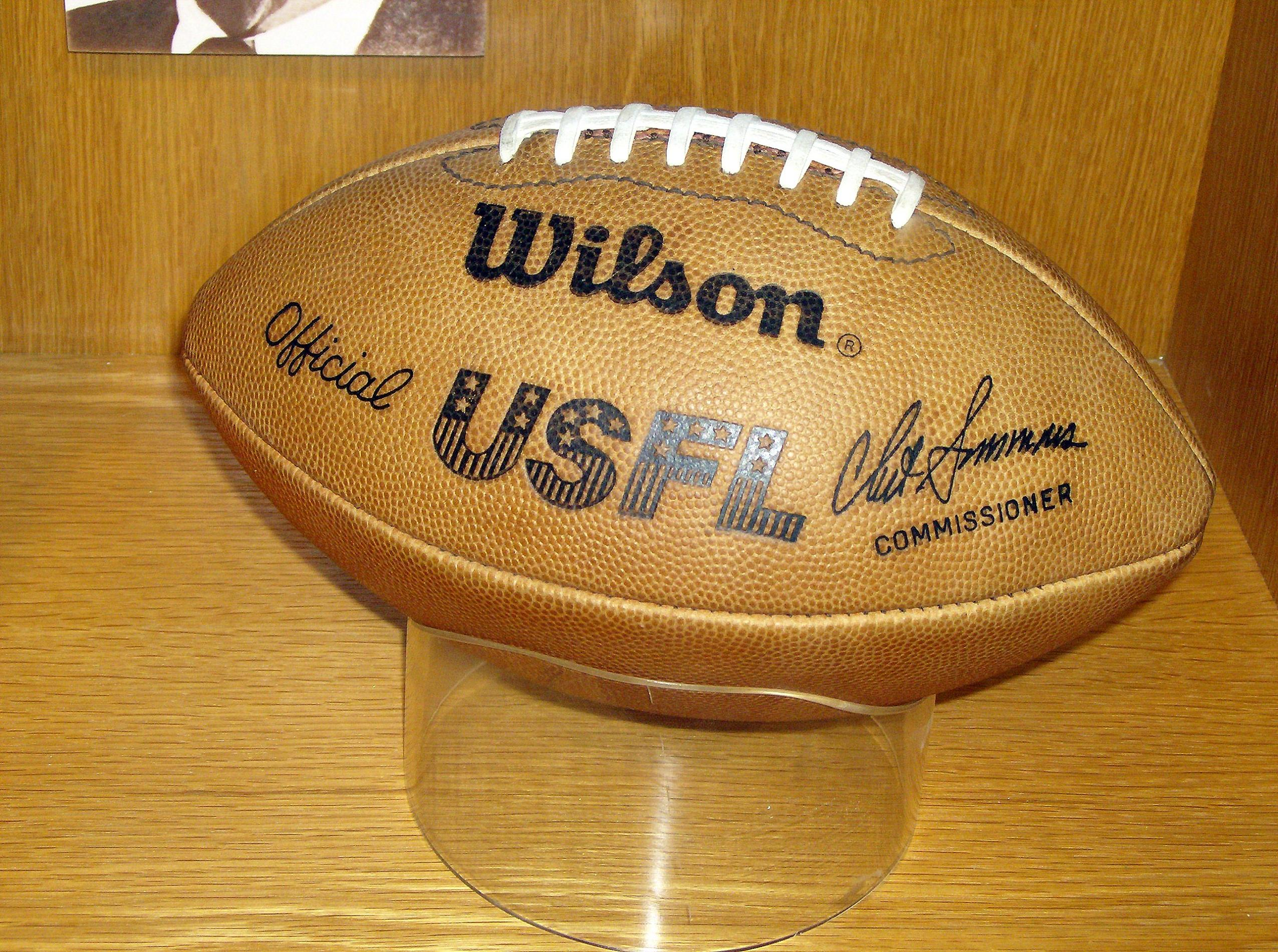
Official USFL football.

Over the next 15 years, Dixon studied the last two challengers to the NFL's dominance of pro football—the successful American Football League and the troubled World Football League. In 1980, he commissioned a study by Frank Magid Associates that found promising results for a spring and summer football league. He had also formed a blueprint for the prospective league's operations, which included early television exposure, heavy promotion in home markets, and owners with the resources and patience to absorb years of losses—which he felt would be inevitable until the league found its feet. He also assembled a list of prospective franchises located in markets attractive to a potential television partner.

Dixon was well aware that many attempts to challenge the NFL had foundered due to financial troubles. The WFL, for instance, was plagued by teams that were so badly underfinanced that they could not meet the most basic expenses. With this in mind, Dixon wanted to ensure that USFL teams had the wherewithal to put a credible product on the field. To that end, the league required potential owners to submit to a detailed due diligence and meet strict capitalization requirements. They were also required to post a $1.5 million letter of credit for emergencies.

With respected college and NFL coach John Ralston as the first employee, Dixon signed up 12 cities—nine where there already were NFL teams and three where there were not. The Dixon Plan called for teams in top TV markets to entice the networks into offering the league a TV deal. All but two of the 12 initial teams were located in the top 13 media markets in the US at the time.

After almost two years of preparation, Dixon formally announced the USFL's formation at the 21 Club in New York City on May 11, 1982, to begin play in 1983. ESPN president Chet Simmons was named the league's first commissioner in June 1982.

According to the Dixon Plan, if the league was going to be a success, it needed television revenue and exposure. In 1983, the league signed contracts with both over-the-air broadcaster ABC and a cable TV broadcaster, the four-year old ESPN, to televise games. The deals yielded roughly $13 million in 1983 and $16 million in 1984, including $9 million per year from ABC. ABC had options for the 1985 season at $14 million and 1986 at $18 million. Each week, there would be a nationally televised game, as well as the USFL's own version of Monday Night football.

=== Stumbles before play begins ===
Like almost all startup pro football leagues, the USFL had some off-the-field factors that prevented the league from starting out with their preferred membership. The problems started when the original owner of the Los Angeles franchise, Alex Spanos, pulled out and instead became a minority owner (and eventually majority owner) of the NFL's San Diego Chargers. Jim Joseph, a real estate developer who had lost out to friend Tad Taube for the USFL's San Francisco Bay Area franchise, had thought he would be content to be a part-owner of the Oakland Invaders. When the potentially more lucrative Los Angeles franchise became available, Joseph snapped up the rights to the area. The owners of the USFL's San Diego franchise, cable television moguls Bill Daniels and Alan Harmon, were denied a lease for Jack Murphy Stadium. While this was in part due to pressure from the Chargers, the main opposition came from Major League Baseball's Padres, who held the lease to the stadium at the time and did not want to see football played at the facility throughout the baseball season. Los Angeles was seen as critical to the league's success, and Dixon and Simmons felt that two cable moguls would be better suited to head the league's efforts there. Joseph was forced to move his operation to Tempe, Arizona, where it became the Arizona Wranglers. Daniels and Harmon's team became the Los Angeles Express.

The League's Boston franchise, the Breakers, also had stadium problems. The Boston ownership group wanted to play in Harvard Stadium, but were unable to close a deal with the university; Sullivan Stadium was owned by the New England Patriots, who were unwilling to share their venue with a rival, while Fenway Park was being used in the spring and throughout the summer by the Boston Red Sox and was also unavailable, and Alumni Stadium on the campus of Boston College, for reasons never made public, also declined. Finally they were able to negotiate a lease to play at Nickerson Field on the campus of Boston University, a facility with seating for just 21,000.

There were plans to establish four franchises in Canada prior to the inaugural season, located in Vancouver, Edmonton, Montreal and the Toronto/Hamilton metroplex (with the last of these to play at Ivor Wynne Stadium). The proposal was pushed by John F. Bassett, the Canadian who would go on to own the Tampa Bay Bandits USFL team. However, Senator Keith Davey warned that the Canadian government would act to protect the Canadian Football League (the league in which all four of the aforementioned Canadian cities had teams in) from competition. The Canadian Football Act had been proposed, but not approved, when Bassett had tried to establish the Toronto Northmen in the World Football League in 1974. Such legislation would have banned US football leagues from playing in Canada. In particular, Montreal's CFL team, the Concordes, was on precarious financial ground, having just been established to replace the recently folded Alouettes. This led Bassett to drop the idea.

Once play actually started, the league experienced the same kind of franchise instability, relocation, and closures that almost all pro football leagues, including the NFL, experienced in their early years.

=== The 1983 season ===
- The Washington Federals finished tied with the Arizona Wranglers as the league's worst team with 4–14 records. The Federals were coached by the Canadian Football League's fourth most successful coach at the time, Ray Jauch. The team was injury prone and mistake prone, on and off the field. Prior to the 1983 season, the team traded away the rights to the league's leading sacker, linebacker John Corker to Michigan for a 5th round pick. In spite of a rotating door at QB, the Federals lost 8 games by a TD or less, a fact that gave team owner Berl Bernhard hope for the 1984 season. The 1983 team finished second to last in attendance drawing 13,850 per game.
- New Jersey Generals' running back Herschel Walker emerged as the league's first superstar running for 1,812 yards and 17 TDs. However, the team won only 6 games.
- The Denver Gold won only 7 of 18 games in their first year, but finished first in the league in attendance drawing an average of 41,736 fans to see a team that featured a number of former Broncos. Team owner Ron Blanding stuck to his budget, and took great pride in seeing his team defeat the big budget Chicago Blitz in Chicago 16–13 in week three on a TD run with 22 seconds to go. Blanding fired very popular former Broncos Coach Red Miller after a 4–7 start, but was still able to finish the season with strong attendance. Due to low attendance numbers and over budget spending on players on all the other teams in the league, Blanding's Gold was the only USFL team to turn a profit in 1983.
- The Oakland Invaders finished 9–9 and won the Pacific Division behind the play of 29-year-old quarterback Fred Besana and former Oakland Raiders tight end Raymond Chester and halfback Arthur Whittington. Besana had played for the Twin City Cougars of the California Football League from 1980 to 1982, but played like a proven veteran, finishing the season as the league's second rated passer.
- In spite of a strong team led by 36-year-old former WFL quarterback Johnnie Walton and CFL veteran halfback Richard Crump, the Boston Breakers were unable to draw the regular sellouts they needed to survive at Nickerson. (Even when they sold out Nickerson, they still lost money due to its small capacity.) Boston finished the season 11–7, narrowly missing the playoffs. Walton, who had retired from pro football years earlier, and had spent the previous 3 years coaching college football, was the league's 7th ranked passer. Boston and Washington were the only USFL teams to draw less than 14,000 per game in 1983. The other 10 teams drew over 18,000 per game.
- The George Allen-led Chicago Blitz had been described as an "NFL caliber" team and were heavily favored to win the title and dominate the rest of the league. The team was stacked with quality players, led by NFL veteran quarterback Greg Landry, rookie HB Tim Spencer of Ohio State, and rookie wide receiver Trumaine Johnson of Grambling. In week two, Jim Joseph's Arizona Wranglers led by rookie quarterback Alan Risher of LSU came from a fourth-quarter 29–12 deficit to defeat the Blitz 30–29 in a game considered by many to be the biggest upset in USFL history. The Blitz would go on to lose five more games in the regular season and be edged out by Michigan for the Central Division title. In the first round of the playoffs, the Blitz would carry a 38–17 lead into the fourth quarter vs. the host Philadelphia Stars before losing to the Stars 44–38 in OT.
- The Philadelphia Stars finished a league best 15–3. Led by Coach Jim Mora, NFL veteran quarterback Chuck Fusina, rookie halfback Kelvin Bryant of North Carolina and a very good defense led by linebacker Sam Mills, the Stars made it to the title game where they almost came back from a 17–3 third-quarter deficit before falling 24–22 to the Michigan Panthers.
- Michigan Panthers owner A. Alfred Taubman quickly decided he was willing to pay to fill the holes on his team with NFL caliber talent. Early in the season, the Panthers signed NFL veterans like guard Thom Dornbrook, offensive tackle Ray Pinney, fullback Cleo Miller and defensive end John Banaszak. Consequently, after a 1–4 start, the team jelled and finished the regular season 11–2, edging out Chicago for the Central Division title. They dispatched Oakland in the playoffs 37–21 and weathered a frantic comeback by the Stars to become the first league champions.

On the whole, the inaugural season was a success for the league. Attendance was in line with league expectations at about 25,000 fans per game, and television ratings slightly exceeded projections (an average Nielsen rating of 6.1, when the league had aimed for 5.0). The brand of play was exciting and entertaining, and the 1983 championship was generally recognized as being a more entertaining game than most of the Super Bowls of the era. Even in cities where the fans were not numerous, the fan base was passionate; the documentary Small Potatoes: Who Killed the USFL? made note of a regular-season game in which Boston Breakers fans stormed the field following a come-from-behind victory over the Stars at Nickerson Field.

=== The 1983–1984 off-season ===
- In September 1983, the New Jersey Generals were sold by J. Walter Duncan to real-estate magnate Donald Trump. The year before, Trump had been tapped to be the original owner of the franchise, but had backed out in order to make an unsuccessful bid to buy the NFL's Baltimore Colts; the league subsequently awarded the franchise to Duncan instead.
- The Boston Breakers were unable to find a more suitable venue within Boston and its surrounding areas, so the Breakers relocated to New Orleans on October 18, 1983, and later sold to New Orleans businessman Joseph Canizaro.
- Seeing the out-of-control spending worsening, Blanding sold his Denver Gold to Doug Spedding for $10 million. Blanding is widely thought to be the only owner to make a profit on the USFL.
- Needing fresh capital, the league chose to expand league membership from 12 to 18 teams, adding the Pittsburgh Maulers, Houston Gamblers, San Antonio Gunslingers, Memphis Showboats, Oklahoma Outlaws and Jacksonville Bulls. The Dixon plan called for expansion to 16 in the league's second year. The Outlaws were originally slated to play in San Diego, but as was the case with what became the Express, could not get a lease for Jack Murphy Stadium. The Outlaws opened play in Tulsa at Skelly Stadium. The Gamblers were technically not an expansion team. Founder David Dixon had reserved a franchise for himself in founding the league. He had chosen not to field a team in 1983 to help guide the league. By 1984, Dixon was disgusted with the path the league was on and the league owners were sick of Dixon's constant complaints about them overspending. With their blessing, he sold his franchise for slightly less than the $6 million expansion fee. Dixon's franchise became the Houston Gamblers.
- After seeing the Wranglers lose ten games in a row to finish 4–14 (tied with Washington for the league's worst record) and perhaps more importantly seeing attendance wilt in the summer heat at Sun Devil Stadium, Joseph decided to sell the Wranglers. Meanwhile, in spite of having the league's highest profile coach, George Allen, and being at worst the third best team in the league, the Chicago Blitz had drawn an anemic 18,133 per game, unable to contend with Major League Baseball's Cubs and White Sox, the latter on their way to the postseason for the first time in 24 years. Blitz owner Dr. Ted Diethrich, a Phoenix resident, felt the losses did not justify an investment so far from his home in Phoenix. Diethrich sold the Blitz to Milwaukee heart surgeon James Hoffman, and then bought the Wranglers from Joseph. Almost immediately after Diethrich closed on his purchase of the Wranglers, he and Hoffman swapped their team assets—coaching staff, most of the players, and all. To Blitz fans, it seemed that Hoffman had jettisoned one of the league's elite teams in favor of a team that tied for the league's worst record. In truth it was worse than that. In a league starved for competent QB play, Wrangler triggerman Alan Risher stayed in Arizona. The new Blitz would feature longtime Bear backup QB Vince Evans (signed in November 1983 to a four-year, $5 million deal). In January, The Blitz tendered an offer that would have been the largest contract in football—$2 million a year for three years—to Bears running back Walter Payton. Payton advised he would consider the offer, but would not be rushed by the Blitz. The Blitz's 1984 season was scheduled to start on February 27, 1984, and they had little success selling season tickets. The Blitz needed Payton to sign quickly to help season ticket sales, so they had put a deadline on the offer of February 9, 1984. Before he made up his mind, the Blitz withdrew the offer realizing they simply did not have the finances. With a less talented team and no big names to excite the fans, Chicago's season ticket sales predictably flatlined, in spite of Hoffman sinking a lot of money into advertising. Just prior to the start of the season, a frustrated Hoffman walked away from the Blitz, leaving the team to the minority owners.
- In addition to Trump buying the Generals, the Los Angeles Express were sold to J. William Oldenburg. The league believed that the teams based in the nation's two largest markets were owned by the owners with the deepest pockets. Trump and Oldenburg both went on signing sprees. Trump poached several NFL starters, including Cleveland's QB Brian Sipe. Oldenburg's Express went after a number of highly regarded collegiate players. This combined with a general lack of quality QBs (only nine QBs in the 12-team league finished the 1983 season with QB ratings above 70) and HBs (even in an 18-game season only six rushers broke the 1000 yard mark) tipped off another explosion in league spending as USFL teams raided the NFL and college ranks to keep up.

=== The 1984 season ===
- The USFL went to a seven-man officiating crew in 1984 adding the side judge.
- After a game 1 blowout 53–14 road loss to the expansion Jacksonville Bulls, Washington Federals head coach Ray Jauch was fired. In week 2, star RB Craig James was injured. The team collapsed. Despite solid play from 2nd year QB Mike Hohensee, WR Joey Walters, and HB Curtis Bledsoe, the team would finish 3–15, losing twice to the 3–15 expansion Pittsburgh Maulers and going 0–7 vs. the expansion teams. With seven games to go in the season, a press conference was held to announce the Federals had been sold to Sherwood "Woody" Weiser who intended to move the team to Miami. The team would be coached by Miami Hurricanes' coach Howard Schnellenberger.
- After two games, William Tatham Jr., son of Oklahoma Outlaws owner William Tatham, announced Skelly Stadium was insufficient to support a pro team and that the Outlaws would be moving the following year. In spite of this lame duck status, awful spring weather, and a season-ending ten-game losing streak, the team drew an average of 21,038 fans per game.
- A few games into the season, with the Chicago Blitz struggling and the fans staying away in droves, the team was near financial collapse. The league was forced to take over the Blitz for the remainder of the 1984 season in order to protect the league's TV deals which called for teams in the New York, Los Angeles and Chicago markets. With 4 games to go, a press conference was held announcing that Eddie Einhorn would become the new owner of the USFL's Chicago franchise. At the press conference, it was stated that although the new team would not be the Blitz, Einhorn's franchise would retain the rights to all Blitz players and coaching staff—strongly implying the team would play in the 1985 season.
- The expansion Houston Gamblers rookie QB Jim Kelly of the University of Miami emerged as the league's second superstar carrying his team to win the central conference with a 13–5 record. Kelly threw 44 TDs and piled up over 5,000 yards. The Gamblers would fall to the eventual league runner up Arizona Wranglers in the playoffs, 17–16.
- The Los Angeles Express' signings of high-profile collegiate players culminated with the signing of BYU QB Steve Young to a $40 million guaranteed contract—at the time, far and away the largest contract in pro football history. The young talent was slow to adapt to the pro game and the Express continued to hover around .500. With one of the leagues' highest payrolls and poor attendance, financial losses mounted. It is estimated that the Express lost as much as $15 million in 1984. The Express did manage to make the playoffs and defeated the defending league champion Panthers 27–21 in triple overtime, before falling to the eventual league runners-up, Allen's Arizona Wranglers, 35–23.
- In spite of seeing his Wranglers team make it to the title game, Ted Diethrich had seen enough. He had lost millions for the second year in a row. Despite fielding a dramatically improved team, he had only had seen a negligible increase in attendance in Arizona over the previous year's numbers.
- The Philadelphia Stars again finished with the league's best record and made it to the title game, this time defeating Diethrich's Wranglers, 23–3.

=== The 1984–1985 off-season ===
- The owner of the Los Angeles Express, J. William Oldenburg, stopped paying the team's bills late in the season after media and federal investigations revealed he had lied about his net worth. News of his financial troubles sent a collective shiver through the league in the middle of the 1984 season. With Chicago already gone, the potential loss of the Express might have put the league's contract with ABC in jeopardy.
- Seeking a larger market, a larger stadium, and to share expenses, the Outlaws sought to merge with the Oakland Invaders, but Oakland Invaders owner Tad Taube walked away from the deal rather than give control of the team to Outlaws part-owner and general manager William Tatham Jr.
- Weiser pulled the plug on his deal to buy the Federals and move them to Miami. Bandits minority owner Donald Dizney, a health care industry magnate unrelated to the differently-spelled Disney family, stepped in 5 days later and bought the Federals. Under his ownership, the team was moved to Orlando, where they became the Orlando Renegades.
- After the league officially announced plans to move to the fall in 1986 (see below), a number of teams moved elsewhere after their owners decided they could not directly compete with the NFL. The Breakers moved a second time, this time to Portland, Oregon. The defending champion Philadelphia Stars moved to Baltimore, capitalizing on the departure of the NFL's Colts to Indiana—until the Stars realized that the Baltimore Orioles still occupied Baltimore's only usable stadium during the spring and summer, forcing the team to settle in College Park, just outside Washington city limits, while retaining the "Baltimore Stars" name until the season moved to the fall in 1986.
- The Michigan Panthers merged with the Oakland Invaders, while the Pittsburgh Maulers folded after losing a reported $10 million in their only season.
- Einhorn, who along with Trump was one of the principal advocates of fall play, decided to sit out the 1985 season. ABC cleared this move due to the league's anemic ratings in Chicago, allowing the league to shut down the Blitz, who had lost nearly $6 million in 1984.
- The assets of Diethrich's Arizona Wranglers (see Chicago Blitz of 1983) would be acquired by the Tathams in a deal often referred to as a "merger", as the rosters were merged. The resulting Arizona Outlaws featured players from both teams but was run by the Tathams.

=== The 1985 season ===
- Gamblers minority owner Jay Roulier agreed to buy the Express, but was pushed out in short order during training camp after it emerged that he had misled league officials about his net worth. The league took control of the team and decided to run it on a shoestring until a new owner could be found. The league financed and ran the Express all season, but could not find an owner. With a huge salary burden and dreadful attendance, the Express barely survived the season.
- Owners agree to a 4-year CBA with the United States Football League Players Association.
- San Antonio Gunslingers owner Clinton Manges stopped paying the team's bills with about a month to go in the season.
- The Denver Gold's attendance flatlined due to the planned move to the fall, as fans were not willing to choose between the Gold and the NFL's Broncos. The Gold would have hosted a playoff game against the Memphis Showboats, but ABC forced the league to move the game to Memphis rather than endure the embarrassment of playing in a near-empty Mile High Stadium.
- Stallions owner Marvin Warner was forced to give up control of the team after Home State Savings Bank, the Cincinnati savings and loan he controlled, was brought down in a massive run, one of the first casualties of the savings and loan crisis. Unfortunately, the Stallions' emergency letter of credit was drawn on Home State, rendering it worthless. Team president Jerry Sklar urged the Stallions' limited partners to chip in more money, and persuaded the city government to buy a $100,000 stake in the team along with a $900,000 credit line. This allowed the Stallions to finish out the season.

=== The 1985–1986 off-season ===
- The San Antonio Gunslingers had their franchise revoked when Manges ignored a league-imposed deadline to make restitution for the team's debts.
- The Breakers were disbanded after owner Joe Canizaro suffered two-year losses in the realm of $17 million.
- Los Angeles and Oakland announced that they would suspend operations.
- Denver merged with Jacksonville, to play the 1986 season in Jacksonville, while Houston merged with New Jersey, to play in New Jersey.
- Although Eddie Einhorn remained involved with the league's antitrust lawsuit, he opted not to field a Chicago team in the USFL's fall 1986 season as planned, and the team was left off the proposed 1986 schedule.
- Tampa Bay initially pulled out of the league, prepared to continue playing in the spring even if it meant forming a new league; owner John Bassett was, in either case, too ill to continue and would die on May 14, 1986. Lee Scarfone agreed to take over the Bandits' USFL franchise in July 1985 and have the team play a fall schedule.

=== 1986 ===
Arizona, Baltimore, Birmingham, Jacksonville, Memphis, New Jersey, Orlando and a newly reorganized Tampa Bay team were scheduled to play an ultimately aborted 18-game fall schedule season in 1986. At the time, only New Jersey and Tampa Bay shared markets with an NFL team (in New Jersey's case, they shared with two NFL teams).

=== 2022 ===
It was announced that the USFL would be returning in March 2022 with at least eight teams and a broadcasting deal with Fox Sports. Despite claims that this was a reactivation of the old league, no figures from the original league were involved in the new league, which was instead backed by the principals of the extant developmental showcase The Spring League, Brian Woods and Fox Sports. On June 3, 2021, the new USFL confirmed a return in the spring of 2022. In December 2023, it was announced that the new USFL had merged with the XFL to form the United Football League.

== Competition vs. NFL ==
=== The Dixon plan vs. building a league of stars ===
At first the USFL competed with the older, more established National Football League by following the Dixon plan. The plan allowed the league to compete not just by playing its games on a March–June schedule during the NFL off-season, but also by having the following conditions:

- Teams play in large, NFL-caliber stadiums.
- Teams plan for large year 1 pre-season promotional budgets to introduce the team to the local market.
- A tight players' salary cap of $1.8 million per team (the NFL introduced a salary cap in 1994).
- A territorial draft, to better stock teams with familiar local collegiate stars to help the gate (similar to the proposed All-American Football League and used by the now-defunct Alliance of American Football).

The Dixon plan laid out a budget to allow all teams to manage losses in the initial lean years. As mentioned earlier, prospective owners had to meet strict capitalization requirements and post a $1.3 million line of credit for emergencies.

The league's TV revenue met the requirements of the Dixon plan. The Plan called for first year attendance over 18,000 per game. In 1983, 10 of the 12 teams exceeded that threshold. Player spending was where the league deviated from the plan, in the name of pursuing stars.

The league's biggest splash—the signing of Herschel Walker, a three time All-American and the 1982 Heisman Trophy winner—represented a significant breach from the Dixon Plan. Like the NFL, the USFL barred underclassmen from signing. However, league officials were certain that this rule would never stand up in court, so they allowed Walker to sign with the New Jersey Generals. More importantly, Walker signed a three-year contract valued at $4.2 million with a $1 million signing bonus. Due to the USFL's salary cap rules, this was a personal-services contract with Generals owner J. Walter Duncan, and not a standard player contract. Nonetheless, the other owners did not raise any objections, knowing that having the reigning Heisman winner in the fold would lend the league instant credibility.

Other marquee stars to sign with the league were Craig James, Anthony Carter and Kelvin Bryant as well as some familiar NFL vets like Chuck Fusina and members of the NFL vet laden Chicago Blitz, like Greg Landry, showed that the upstart league was a credible challenger to the NFL. The league also made a serious run at some other stars, such as Eric Dickerson and Dan Marino.

The pursuit of top-level talent proved to be a double-edged sword. While the presence of many blue-chip stars proved the league could put a competitive product on the field, many teams wildly exceeded the league's player salary cap in order to put more competitive teams on the field. For instance, the Michigan Panthers reportedly lost $6 million—three times what Dixon suggested a team could afford to lose in the first season—even as they became the league's first champions. The desire to compete with other loaded USFL teams and for the league to be seen as approaching NFL caliber led to almost all of the teams exceeding the Dixon Plan's team salary cap amount within the league's first 6–18 months.

Dixon urged the members of the league to reduce spending. Rather than backing off spending, recommitting to a firmer salary cap, and dispersing some of the larger contracts to expansion teams to alleviate the problem, the league sought other options to take on revenue to cover increased costs overruns. These actions magnified the problem.

The league added six more teams in 1984 rather than the four initially envisioned by Dixon, to pocket two more expansion fees. This put more pressure on the TV deal, which was not designed to support an 18 team league. A frustrated Dixon sold his stake and got out.

Additionally, the league was so determined to appear to put a credible product on the field that on some occasions, it set aside its own vetting procedures–all of which backfired disastrously. When Diethrich sold the Blitz to Hoffman in order to clear the way for his purchase of the Wranglers before the 1984 season, they did not take a close look at Hoffman's financial statements. Realizing he was in over his head, Hoffman was forced to scramble to find minority partners. When there were no takers, he walked away from the team after the second preseason game, forcing the league to take over the team.

In San Antonio, the league was so enamored at Manges' apparent oil wealth that it not only did not closely vet his application, but did not require him to make an initial capital investment. Instead, Manges paid team expenses out of pocket as they arose, resulting in an operation that appeared short of professional standards. The Gunslingers' offices were in a double-wide trailer, and they used folding chairs to bring Alamo Stadium up to minimum capacity. Manges' practices caught up with him in 1985, when the oil market collapsed. The result was a litany of bounced checks, culminating in the team going the last four games without pay. It later emerged that Manges had been in financial difficulty as early as 1980.

The worst situation of all, however, was in Los Angeles. Original owners Alan Harmon and Bill Daniels sold the Express to mortgage banker J. William Oldenburg before the 1984 season. Swayed by Oldenburg's apparent net worth of $100 million, the USFL took his word as evidence that he would be a solid owner for one of its marquee franchises. However, in June 1984, investigations by the FBI, The New York Times and The Wall Street Journal revealed that the man who made waves by signing a roster of high-priced young talent did not have even a fraction of the money to buy the team. He abruptly walked away from the team during the playoffs. Gamblers minority owner Jay Roulier took over the team in October, only to be pushed out just months later when it emerged that he too had lied about his net worth. The league was forced to run the team on a shoestring that season.

With the new wave of teams, more prominent college athletes like Marcus Dupree, Mike Rozier, Reggie White, Jim Kelly, Steve Young and other young stars of the day signed high dollar contracts to play for USFL teams in 1984, as did high-profile NFL athletes like Doug Williams, Brian Sipe, Joe Cribbs, and Gary Barbaro.

=== Spring schedule vs. fall schedule ===
In 1984, the league began discussing the possibility of competing head-to-head with the NFL by playing its games in the fall beginning in 1986. The strongest proponents of playing in the fall were Chicago owner Eddie Einhorn and Generals owner Donald Trump. Einhorn and Trump argued that if the USFL moved to the fall, it would eventually force a merger with the NFL in which the older league would have to admit at least some USFL teams. They also argued that if a merger did occur, the surviving teams' original investment would more than double.

A consulting firm recommended sticking with a spring season. Despite the protests of many of the league's "old guard", who wanted to stay with the original plan of playing football in the spring months, on August 22, 1984, the owners voted to move to the fall starting in 1986. On April 29, 1985, the league's owners voted 13–2 to reaffirm their decision to begin playing a fall season in 1986. Tampa Bay Bandits owner John F. Bassett, who had registered one of the two "nay" votes, declared his intention to pull his team out of the USFL and organize a new spring football league. However, failing health (he died from cancer in May 1986) forced Bassett to abandon his plans and sell the Bandits to minor partner Lee Scarfone, who agreed to keep the franchise in the USFL. The spring advocates had lost, and the fall advocates now set their sights on forcing a merger with the NFL, or at the very least winning a sizable settlement and securing a TV network for fall broadcasts.

As a direct result of this decision, the Pittsburgh Maulers folded rather than compete with the Pittsburgh Steelers, the sale of the struggling Washington Federals to Weiser's Miami-based ownership group collapsed, the New Orleans Breakers and 1984 champion Philadelphia Stars had to relocate, and the 1983 champion Michigan Panthers surprised the commissioner with an announcement that they would not be playing in the Detroit area for the 1985 season. Panthers owner A. Alfred Taubman informed the league at the meeting that he had negotiated a conditional merger with Tad Taube's Oakland Invaders depending on the outcome of the vote, with Taubman as majority owner. With an expectation of fall play in 1986, Einhorn decided not to field a team for the final lame duck spring 1985 season. Within a few weeks of the decision, the USFL had been forced to abandon four lucrative markets, abort a move to a fifth and suspend operations in a sixth. In hindsight, this destroyed the USFL's viability, although the Maulers folding likely would've happened anyway due to the team being owned by shopping mall magnate Edward J. DeBartolo Sr. (who also owned the National Hockey League's Pittsburgh Penguins at the time), whose son Edward J. DeBartolo Jr. owned the Super Bowl champion San Francisco 49ers (a team now owned by his sister Denise DeBartolo York), causing a potential conflict of interest for the family between the USFL and the NFL.

ABC offered the USFL a 4-year, $175 million TV deal to play in the spring in 1986. ESPN offered $70 million over 3 years. Following all the mergers and shutdowns, there just were not enough spring football advocates left in the league to accept those contracts. The owners in the league walked away from what averaged out to $67 million per year starting in 1986 to pursue victory over the NFL.

After the 1985 season, more plans were announced to accommodate the fall schedule, pool financial resources and avoid costly head-to-head competition with NFL teams. Two mergers were announced. The Denver Gold merged with the Jacksonville Bulls, with the Bulls as the surviving team. Trump bought the assets of the Houston Gamblers for an undisclosed amount and merged them with the New Jersey Generals. While the Generals were the surviving team, Gamblers coach Jack Pardee was named as the merged team's new coach. Both the Gold and Gamblers had seen their attendance plummet to unsustainable levels, as their fanbases were not willing to abandon the Denver Broncos and Houston Oilers, respectively. In spite of all of these changes, the USFL would never play a fall game.

=== USFL v. NFL lawsuit ===
In another effort to keep themselves afloat while at the same time attacking the more established National Football League, the USFL filed an antitrust lawsuit against the older league, claiming it had established a monopoly with respect to television broadcasting rights, and in some cases, on access to stadium venues.

The case was first heard by United States District Judge Peter K. Leisure in the United States District Court for the Southern District of New York. The USFL claimed that the NFL had bullied ABC, CBS and NBC into not televising USFL games in the fall. It also claimed that the NFL had a specific plan to eliminate the USFL, the "Porter Presentation". In particular, the USFL claimed the NFL conspired to ruin the Invaders and Generals. The USFL sought damages of $567 million, which would have been tripled to $1.7 billion under antitrust law. It hoped to void the NFL's contracts with the three major networks. The USFL proposed two remedies: either force the NFL to negotiate new television contracts with only two networks, or force the NFL to split into two competing 14-team leagues, each limited to a contract with one major network.

The lawyer for the USFL, Harvey Myerson, had what he felt were three "smoking guns".

1. A memo from March 1973 to NFL broadcasting director Robert Cochran, from attorney Jay Moyer stating that an "open network" might be open to the "invitation to formation of a new league".
2. A memo from August 1983 from NFL management council executive director Jack Donlan to his staff. The memo laid out plans for NFL teams to "increase salary offers to USFL to existing players or run the risk of losing them".
3. A 1984 presentation to NFL executives by Harvard Business School professor Michael Porter, which included a plan on "how to conquer" the United States Football League.

All but one of the league's 28 teams was named as a co-defendant. Al Davis, owner of the then-Los Angeles Raiders, was a major witness for the USFL and his team had been excluded from the lawsuit in exchange for his testimony. ABC Sports' Howard Cosell was also a key witness for the USFL.

The case went to trial in the spring of 1986 and lasted 42 days. On July 29, a six-person jury nominally returned a verdict for the USFL. However, the jury's findings were devastating to the upstart league. The jury declared the NFL a "duly adjudicated illegal monopoly", and found that the NFL had willfully acquired and maintained monopoly status in professional football through predatory tactics. However, it rejected the USFL's other claims. The jury found that the USFL had changed its strategy to a more risky goal of forcing a merger with the NFL. Furthermore, the switch to a fall schedule caused the loss of six major markets (Philadelphia, Denver, Houston, Pittsburgh, Detroit, the Bay Area) and derailed a move to a seventh (Miami). The jury also made note of a memo Tad Taube wrote about the dispute, which quoted the comic strip Pogo: "we have met the enemy and he is us".

Most importantly, the jury found that the NFL did not attempt to force the USFL off television. (Indeed, ESPN remained willing to carry USFL games in the fall, several of the league's teams also had local broadcast contracts, and 1986 also happened to be the inaugural season of the Fox Broadcasting Company, a network that would establish itself as the nation's fourth major broadcast network.) In essence, the jury felt that while the USFL was harmed by the NFL's de facto monopolization of pro football in the United States, most of its problems were due to its own mismanagement. It awarded the USFL nominal damages of $1, which was tripled under antitrust law to $3.

When NFL commissioner Pete Rozelle and NFL broadcasting chief Val Pinchbeck initially heard the verdict, they were devastated; Pinchbeck later recalled that he thought Rozelle would have a heart attack. While on their way to the league office, however, they heard that the USFL had lost nearly all of its claims, and headed back to the courthouse.

The verdict was a classic Pyrrhic victory. The USFL had essentially staked its future on winning the suit, hoping to finance the move to the fall by forcing the NFL to pay a substantial settlement. It considered the television-related claims to be the heart of its case. On August 4—four days after the announcement of the verdict—the USFL owners voted to suspend operations for the 1986 season, with the intent of returning in 1987; the league accurately foresaw the 1987 players' strike and had hoped the strike would give the league access to star players. Players signed to contracts were free to sign with NFL (or other professional teams) immediately. Indeed, the NFL had held a draft in 1984 for teams to acquire the rights to USFL players, in the event of the league (or teams in the league) folding. However, it is unlikely the USFL would have been able to put together a viable product in any case. Many of its players had signed contracts with NFL teams after the 1985 season, and the league was some $160 million in debt.

Five days after the verdict, the Tampa Bay Bandits were effectively shut down when a judge placed a lien on the franchise to satisfy back pay owed to former player Bret Clark. All of the team's remaining assets were seized to satisfy the debt. In a desperation move, the Arizona Outlaws arranged a meeting in January 1987 with officials with the Canadian Football League hoping to negotiate a merger between the USFL and CFL; the CFL's owners were "lukewarm" and ultimately rejected the offer. With nearly all of its players under contract to the NFL and CFL, Usher announced the league would stay shuttered in 1987 as well. (Many of the USFL players who were not under NFL contract would end up playing in fall 1987 as replacement players during the strike.)

The USFL unsuccessfully appealed the award to a panel of the United States Court of Appeals for the Second Circuit, which affirmed the district court's judgment in 1988. United States Circuit Judge Ralph K. Winter wrote the panel's opinion. This decision ended any chance of the USFL returning to the field, and the league's six remaining teams (the Outlaws had already decided not to return) voted to formally disband shortly afterward. However, because the USFL was at least nominally the winner of the lawsuit, the NFL was required to cover the USFL's attorney fees and costs of litigation, and the USFL was awarded over $5.5 million in attorney fees and over $62,000 in court costs. That award was appealed by the NFL; it was affirmed on appeal and ultimately allowed to stand by the U.S. Supreme Court in 1990, four years after the USFL had ceased operations.

The USFL finally received a check for $3.76 in damages in 1990, the additional 76¢ representing interest earned while litigation had continued. Notably, that check has never been cashed.

=== Aftermath ===
The USFL had a significant impact on the NFL both on the field and off. Almost all of the USFL's on-field innovations were eventually adopted by the older league, and a multitude of star players in the USFL would go on to enjoy very successful careers in the National Football League.

The NFL would also eventually have franchises in some of the USFL markets which had proved fertile for pro football or showed renewed interest in the game. Jacksonville, in particular, was being courted by the Houston Oilers as a potential relocation destination as early as 1987; that city eventually got the expansion Jaguars in 1995. The Oilers would instead relocate to Tennessee in 1997, playing temporarily for one season in Memphis (to minuscule crowds) before moving to Nashville to become the Tennessee Titans. Although the USFL's stay in Baltimore was brief, the city's acceptance of the Stars, coupled with the success of the Canadian Football League's Baltimore Stallions a decade later, were factors in Art Modell's decision to relocate his Cleveland Browns NFL franchise to Baltimore to become the Baltimore Ravens in 1996. Phoenix was never one of the USFL's strongest markets but still managed to lure the former St. Louis Football Cardinals to take up residence in Arizona in 1988. Oakland saw the return of the Raiders to its city one decade after the demise of the USFL (the team moved again, to Las Vegas, in 2020). Other cities that did not get NFL franchises, such as Birmingham, Memphis, Orlando, and San Antonio, would receive teams in numerous short-lived or international pro football leagues in the years that have followed, such as the WLAF, CFL, the first XFL, UFL, and AAF. The 2022 revival of the USFL began with eight franchises that were in existence during the 1984 USFL season, including the Birmingham Stallions. Also, three decades after the USFL's failure, the NFL played the 2017 Pro Bowl in Orlando.

Outside the NFL, Tampa's embrace of Bandit Ball and the rapid growth of the Sun Belt prompted the establishment of other major league teams in the Tampa Bay area: the National Hockey League's Lightning and Major League Baseball's Devil Rays (later renamed the Rays).

The collapse of the USFL had a particularly positive effect on the NFL's Buffalo Bills. The Bills, as a small-market NFL franchise, were particularly hard-hit by the USFL; as its players from the moderately successful early 1980s era aged, the team was unable to find quality replacements for them on the free agent market, as the USFL was drawing away much of pro football's top talent (including Bills running back Joe Cribbs and the team's planned franchise quarterback of the future, Jim Kelly). With subpar talent, the Bills went 4–28 over the course of 1984 and 1985, and average attendance at Rich Stadium plummeted to under 30,000 fans per game, putting the team's long-term viability in jeopardy. When the USFL collapsed, the Bills signed a large number of former USFL players: Kelly, Kent Hull, Ray Bentley, special teams coach Bruce DeHaven, general manager Bill Polian and coach Marv Levy, which, combined with the high draft picks compiled during the USFL years, would allow the Bills to rise to perennial Super Bowl contenders by the early 1990s. In 2014, after founding owner Ralph Wilson died, Trump tried to purchase the Bills, but was largely rebuffed in favor of Terry Pegula, who bid $400 million more for the team. In a 2015 interview with Sports Illustrated, Trump claimed that if he had bought the Bills in 2014, he "probably would not be" running for President of the United States the following year.

The league also had an indirect impact on the scheduling of televised football games. The USFL had planned to go against the NFL in the fall of 1986 without directly playing its games opposite the larger league by playing its games on Sunday nights, when the NFL did not play yet. One year later, ESPN and the NFL launched Sunday Night Football in the time slot.

The last player of the USFL on an NFL roster was Philadelphia/Baltimore Stars punter Sean Landeta, who was signed in late 1986 by the New York Giants. He officially announced his retirement on March 6, 2008, the 25th anniversary of the first USFL game. (He last played in 2006 but he did not officially retire during the 2007 season.) The last non-kicker to retire was quarterback Doug Flutie, who played in both the CFL and NFL until 2005.

== Rule changes ==
The USFL, compared to other professional leagues of the late 20th and 21st centuries, did not radically change the rules of the game; its rules largely resembled a hybrid of the NFL and college football rulebooks. The league's rule on stopping the clock was one example of this hybrid approach: outside the two-minute warning, the clock ran between plays after a first down like in the NFL, while after the warning, it stopped between the end of the play that earned a first down and the placement of the ball back into play (to allow the chain crew to get into place), as is done in college football. Like college football, it recognized the two-point conversion (that was, at that time, only recognized in the CFL at the professional level) that would not be put into NFL rules until 1994. Unlike other American professional football leagues (but like the NCAA then and the CFL), the USFL allowed the usage of a small, plastic "tee" for extra point and field goal attempts.

For its final season in 1985, the USFL used a method of challenging officials' rulings on the field via instant replay, using a system that is almost identical to that used by the NFL today; the NFL would adopt its first instant replay system (but in a different form from its current one instituted in 1999) in 1986; it would be used until 1991.

== Notable people and achievements ==
=== USFL alumni in the Pro Football Hall of Fame ===
As of 2026, there are nine USFL alumni (including five players and two head coaches) who are enshrined in the Pro Football Hall of Fame:

- Sid Gillman (front office consultant) – Oklahoma Outlaws and Los Angeles Express 1984 – HOF Class 1983
- Bill Polian (player personnel director) – Chicago Blitz 1984 – HOF Class 2015
- George Allen (coach) – Chicago Blitz 1983 & Arizona Wranglers 1984 – HOF Class 2002
- Marv Levy (coach) – Chicago Blitz 1984 – HOF Class 2001
- Jim Kelly – Houston Gamblers 1984–1985 – HOF Class 2002
- Sam Mills – Philadelphia/Baltimore Stars 1983-1985 – HOF Class 2022
- Reggie White – Memphis Showboats 1984–85 – HOF Class 2006
- Steve Young – LA Express 1984–1985 – HOF Class 2005
- Gary Zimmerman – LA Express 1984–1985 – HOF Class 2008

=== League MVP awards ===
- 1983: Kelvin Bryant, RB, Philadelphia Stars
- 1984: Jim Kelly, QB, Houston Gamblers
- 1985: Herschel Walker, RB, New Jersey Generals

=== Championship game MVP awards ===
- 1983: Bobby Hebert, QB, Michigan Panthers
- 1984: Chuck Fusina QB, Philadelphia Stars
- 1985: Kelvin Bryant RB, Baltimore Stars

=== Commissioners ===
- Chet Simmons (1982–1985); resigned under pressure from owners.
- Harry Usher (1985–1987); league ceased operations.

=== All-time leaders ===
- Rushing attempts: 1,143 Herschel Walker
- Rushing yards: 5,562 Herschel Walker
- Rushing touchdowns: 54 Herschel Walker
- Receiving catches: 234 Jim Smith
- Receiving yards: 3,685 Jim Smith
- Receiving touchdowns: 31 Jim Smith
- Passing attempts: 1,352 John Reaves
- Passing completions: 766 John Reaves
- Passing yards: 10,039 Bobby Hebert
- Passing touchdowns: 83 Jim Kelly
- Passing interceptions: 57 Bobby Hebert

== Teams ==
Projected 1986 teams in gray

=== List ===
- Arizona Wranglers (1983, 1984; Arizona and Chicago traded players)
  - Arizona Outlaws (1985; result of Arizona/Oklahoma merger)
- Birmingham Stallions (1983–1985)
- Boston Breakers (1983)
  - New Orleans Breakers (1984; moved from Boston)
  - Portland Breakers (1985; moved from New Orleans)
- Chicago Blitz (1983, 1984; Arizona and Chicago traded players)
- Denver Gold (1983–1985)
- Houston Gamblers (1984–1985)
- Jacksonville Bulls (1984–1985)
- Los Angeles Express (1983–1985)
- Memphis Showboats (1984–1985)
- Michigan Panthers (1983–1984; merged with Oakland for 1985 season)
- New Jersey Generals (1983–1985)
- Oakland Invaders (1983–1985; merged with Michigan for 1985 season)
- Oklahoma Outlaws (1984)
- Philadelphia Stars (1983–1984)
  - Baltimore Stars (1985; moved from Philadelphia)
- Pittsburgh Maulers (1984)
- San Antonio Gunslingers (1984–1985)
- Tampa Bay Bandits (1983–1985)
- Washington Federals (1983–1984)
  - Orlando Renegades (1985; moved from Washington)

=== Playoff appearances ===
3: Philadelphia (83, 84) / Baltimore (85) Stars
2: Michigan Panthers (83, 84), Oakland Invaders (83, 85), New Jersey Generals (84, 85), Birmingham Stallions (84, 85), Tampa Bay Bandits (84, 85), Houston Gamblers (84, 85)
1: Chicago Blitz (83), Arizona Wranglers (84), Los Angeles Express (84), Memphis Showboats (85), Denver Gold (85)

=== 1986 proposal ===
Prior to the jury award in USFL v. NFL, the league had planned to go forward with a 1986 season with eight teams, divided into an "Independence Division" and a "Liberty Division":

- Independence Division
  - Arizona Outlaws
  - Jacksonville Bulls^{1}
  - Orlando Renegades
  - Tampa Bay Bandits
- Liberty Division
  - Baltimore Stars
  - Birmingham Stallions
  - Memphis Showboats
  - New Jersey Generals^{2}

^{1} merged with Denver Gold
^{2} merged with Houston Gamblers

Due to the legal aftermath of the failed lawsuit against the NFL, the USFL folded and this divisional format never came to fruition.

Out of the 23 USFL teams, only five played for the league's entire three-season duration without relocating or changing team names: Denver Gold, Los Angeles Express, Birmingham Stallions, New Jersey Generals, and Tampa Bay Bandits. Only the latter three teams would have remained on this list if the league had continued in 1986.

== Championship games ==
Date	Winning Team		Losing Team		Location		Attendance	MVP	Television
July 17, 1983	Michigan Panthers	24	Philadelphia Stars	22	Mile High Stadium	Denver, Colorado	50,906	Bobby Hebert	ABC
July 15, 1984	Philadelphia Stars	23	Arizona Wranglers	3	Tampa Stadium	Tampa, Florida	52,662	Chuck Fusina	ABC
July 14, 1985	Baltimore Stars	28	Oakland Invaders	24	Giants Stadium	East Rutherford, New Jersey	49,263	Kelvin Bryant	ABC

The 1985 game was originally to be played at the Pontiac Silverdome, but after the Panthers merged with Oakland, the game was awarded to Giants Stadium.

Had there been a 1986 season, the championship game was scheduled to be played at Jacksonville's Gator Bowl Stadium on February 1, 1987.

The USFL's championship trophy had a silver USFL-logoed helmet with a gold facemask, mounted on a marble base by a swooping silver armature. On the base were mounted gold plaques with the names and scores of the teams in the USFL Championship Games. Like the NHL's Stanley Cup and the CFL's Grey Cup, but unlike the NFL's Vince Lombardi Trophy for their Super Bowl championship game, it was loaned to the winning team for one year rather than a new trophy being made each year for the winning team to keep. After the Philadelphia/Baltimore Stars won the final USFL championship in 1985, General Manager Carl Peterson kept the trophy, and donated it to the Pro Football Hall of Fame in 2018.

== Drafts ==
The USFL held its 1983, 1985 and 1986 college drafts at the Grand Hyatt Hotel in New York. The 1984 draft was held at the Roosevelt Hotel in New York. The 1983–85 drafts were in January while the 1986 draft was held in May.

The USFL held an expansion draft in September 1983 for the 6 expansion teams that started play in 1984. In December 1984, they had a dispersal draft for Chicago, Pittsburgh, Oklahoma and Michigan.

In addition to the four college drafts, the league also held three USFL Territorial Drafts that allowed teams to select collegiate players from within their geographic area before they entered the general collegiate draft.

=== First overall pick in college drafts ===
Of the four first overall draft picks in its history, only 1984 top pick Mike Rozier actually played in the USFL. Dan Marino and Jerry Rice chose to play in the NFL, where they were also picked in the first round by the Miami Dolphins and San Francisco 49ers, respectively, and each went on to have Hall of Fame careers. The USFL ceased operations soon after the 1986 draft, so Mike Haight never signed with nor played in the league, instead being drafted by the NFL's New York Jets.

Draft	Date	Location	Player	Position	College	USFL Team
1983	January 4, 1983	Grand Hyatt Hotel, New York	Dan Marino	QB	Pittsburgh	Los Angeles Express
1984	January 4, 1984	Roosevelt Hotel, New York	Mike Rozier	RB	Nebraska	Pittsburgh Maulers
1985	January 3, 1985	Grand Hyatt Hotel, New York	Jerry Rice	WR	Mississippi Valley State	Birmingham Stallions
1986	May 6, 1986	Grand Hyatt Hotel, New York	Mike Haight	OT	Iowa	Orlando Renegades

== See also ==
- Donald Trump and American football
