= Alan Risher =

American football player (born 1961)

No. 7, 11
- Position: Quarterback

Personal information
- Born: May 6, 1961 (age 65); New Orleans, Louisiana, U.S.
- Listed height: 6 ft 4 in (1.93 m)
- Listed weight: 215 lb (98 kg)

Career information
- High school: Salmen
- College: LSU
- NFL draft: 1983: undrafted

Career history
- Arizona Wranglers (1983-1984); Tampa Bay Buccaneers (1985); Green Bay Packers (1987)

Awards and highlights
- Second-team All-SEC (1982)

Career NFL statistics
- Passing attempts: 74
- Passing completions: 44
- Completion percentage: 59.5%
- TD–INT: 3–3
- Passing yards: 564
- Passer rating: 80
- Stats at Pro Football Reference

Alan David Risher (born May 6, 1961) is a former quarterback for the LSU Tigers and the United States Football League (USFL), where he played for the Arizona Wranglers. The USFL was a 12 team league in 1983, so although Risher was drafted 170th overall in the league's 1983 draft, he was actually the team's 15th round pick that year. Risher was the starting quarterback for the Wranglers for most of the league's initial 1983 season. He is known best for directing what is widely acknowledged as the greatest upset in USFL history. He backed up Greg Landry on the 1984 Western Conference Champion Wranglers squad.

He would later play in the National Football League for the Tampa Bay Buccaneers and the Green Bay Packers going 2-1 as a starting quarterback for the Packers during the strike. Risher played collegiate ball for Louisiana State University from 1979-1982. Alan, has a son, Chad Risher, who owns his own business in Charlotte, North Carolina.

== Professional career ==
=== United States Football League ===
==== 1983 ====
The matchup between the Arizona Wranglers and George Allen's Chicago Blitz that occurred Saturday, March 12, 1983, is widely considered the greatest upset in league history.

The Wranglers opened their initial season with two rookies competing for the starting quarterback job. Risher and fellow rookie quarterback Todd Krueger of Northern Michigan had both played poorly in the teams' 24-0 opening loss to the Oakland Invaders, combining for 140 total yards passing on 32 attempts. Wrangler coach Doug Shively decided to go with Risher as the starter in week 2, vs. the league's preseason title favorite, the Chicago Blitz. NFL veteran head coach George Allen had stocked his Blitz team with NFL vets and CFL all-stars. Most media experts saw the Blitz as "NFL caliber" and thought the team would dominate the league. Some even questioned whether the Blitz would lose a game after seeing the team destroy the Craig James-led Washington Federals in week one, 28–7.

The Wranglers, on the flipside, were assumed to be the league's worst team. For three quarters, the matchup between the Blitz and Wranglers played to expectations. With 11:23 left in the fourth quarter Blitz quarterback, longtime NFL vet Greg Landry, hit TE Paul Ricker with a 15-yard TD pass to put the Blitz up 29–12. After the ensuing kickoff, Risher brought his team to life. He drove his team 85 yards down the field hitting FSU Rookie WR Jackie Flowers on a 10-yard TD pass. The team successfully went for two, when Riser connected with University of Arizona Rookie TE Mark Keel, cutting the lead to 29–20. The Wrangler defense stiffened up and stopped the Blitz on the next series, forcing a punt.

After a short punt, Risher started on the Blitz 45 yard line and quickly took the team in for another score, this one a 9-yard pass to BYU rookie WR Neil Balholm. The kick was good and with 2:48 left in the game, the score was 29-27 Chicago. The Wranglers' Defense came up with another stop and after another punt, Risher and the offense had the ball on the Arizona 42 with 1:06 to play. Risher guided the team into field goal range and with one second left Wranglers kicker Jim Asmus kicked through the game winner.

The Wranglers improbable 30-29 come from behind victory over Chicago is considered by most to be the biggest upset in league history and one of that league's most important moments. The outcome of the game gave viability to the other teams in the league early in the season and told football fans that there was nothing inevitable about any USFL game's outcome.

Fueled by their comeback win, the young Wranglers flourished. Risher started the next 4 games and led the team to a 3–3 record putting the team in a 4-way tie for the Pacific Division lead. Risher struggled in week 7, giving way to Krueger after 2 Interceptions in an ugly 44–23 loss to the potent Johnnie Walton-led Boston Breakers. Risher came back to start the following week, throwing three touchdowns and playing an error free game, leading the Wranglers back into a tie for first in the division with a 24–3 victory over their Division rivals, the Denver Gold.

From here the season collapsed for Risher and his 4-4 Wranglers. They would finish with a USFL record 10 straight losses. Although, Riser, Keel, Balholm, and Flowers would all end the season among the league leaders, the team was legitimately among the youngest and least talented in the league. The defense and offense were both inconsistent. As the rest of the league rounded into midseason form, the offense struggled and the Wrangler D had difficulties keeping the games within reach. Talent and depth shortfalls, the "Arizona heat", the young team collectively hitting a "rookie wall", and bad coaching are listed as possible factors credited with the collapse of the 1983 Wranglers.

Risher was generally solid if unspectacular down the stretch though he struggles in the Wrangler's 20–14 loss to the Tampa Bay Bandits in week 11, throwing 4 Interceptions. In weeks 14–16, COuch Doug Shively repeatedly removed Risher from the game. Risher did not play in weeks 17 and 18.

In spite of the team's finish, Risher would finish the season as the league's 6th ranked quarterback in 1983.

==== 1984 ====
After the season, the Wranglers were sold to Blitz owner Dr. Ted Diethrich. Coach Shively was fired. The teams traded rosters with the exception of Risher, who stayed in Arizona to serve as backup to Landry on the 1984 Western Conference Champion Arizona Wranglers. Risher would throw 103 passes in 1984 in relief of Landry.

=== National Football League ===
Risher was a member of the Tampa Bay Buccaneers in 1985 before being cut in the 1986 NFL preseason. He then started for the Green Bay Packers strike team in 1987, posting a career rating of 80.0 in the NFL in leading the team to a 2–1 record.

== Career stats ==
Year	Team	GP	Passing						
Year	Team	GP	Cmp	Att	Pct	Yds	TD	Int	Rtg
1983	Arizona Wranglers	16	236	424	55.7	2,672	20	16	74.7
1984	Arizona Wranglers	—	63	103	61.2	722	3	7	63.7
USFL Career		—	299	527	56.7	3,394	23	23	72.6

Year	Team	GP	Passing						
Year	Team	GP	Cmp	Att	Pct	Yds	TD	Int	Rtg
1985	TB	16	0	0	0.0	0	0	0	0.0
1987	GB	3	44	74	59.5	564	3	3	80.0
NFL career		19	44	74	59.5	564	3	3	80.0

Preceded by None	Arizona Wranglers Starting Quarterbacks; 1983	Succeeded by Greg Landry
