= 1979 All-South Independent football team =

American college football season

The 1979 All-South Independent football team consists of American football players chosen by the Associated Press for their All-South independent teams for the 1979 NCAA Division I-A football season.

== Offense ==
Quarterback

- Roch Hontas, Tulane (AP-1)
- Jimmy Jordan, Florida State (AP-2)

Running backs

- George Rogers, South Carolina (AP-1)
- Anthony Collins, East Carolina (AP-1)
- Mark Lyles, Florida State (AP-2)
- Theodore Sutton, East Carolina (AP-2)

Wide receivers

- Jackie Flowers, Florida State (AP-1)
- Alton Alexis, Tulane (AP-1)
- Pat Walker, Miami (AP-2)
- Sidney Snell, Virginia Tech (AP-2)

Tight end

- Marvin Harvey, Southern Mississippi (AP-1)
- Rodney Holman, Tulane (AP-2)

Tackles

- George Schechterly, South Carolina (AP-1)
- Ken Lanier, Florida State (AP-1)
- Matt Mulholland, East Carolina (AP-2)
- Greg Ahrens, Southern Mississippi (AP-2)

Guards

- Wayne Inman, East Carolina (AP-1)
- Mike Good, Florida State (AP-1)
- Arnie Diaz, Tulane (AP-2)
- Mitchell Johnston, East Carolina (AP-2)

Center

- Chris Doyle, Tulane (AP-1)
- James Taylor, Tennessee State (AP-2)

== Defense ==
Defensive ends

- Scott Warren, Florida State (AP-1)
- Bob Benel, Tulane (AP-1)
- Wilfred Simon, Tulane (AP-2)
- Jim Burt, Miami (AP-2)

Defensive tackles

- J.J. Stewart, Southern Mississippi (AP-1)
- Steve Bernish, South Carolina (AP-1)
- Arthur Broussard, South Carolina (AP-2)
- Kevin Cole, Tulane (AP-2)
- Fred Sinclair, South Carolina (AP-2)

Linebackers

- Otis Wilson, Louisville (AP-1)
- Mike Brewington, East Carolina (AP-1)
- Clump Taylor, Southern Mississippi (AP-1)
- Reggie Herring, Florida State (AP-2)
- Aaron Joseph, Tennessee State (AP-2)
- Harold Thompson, Northeast Louisiana (AP-2)
- Marty Wetzel, Tulane (AP-2)

Defensive backs

- Francis "Monk" Bonasorte, Florida State (AP-1)
- Gene Coleman, Miami (AP-1)
- Bobby Butler, Florida State (AP-1)
- Charlie Carter, East Carolina (AP-2)
- David O'Dom, Southern Mississippi (AP-2)

== Special teams ==
Kicker

- Ed Murray, Tulane (AP-1)
- Dave Cappelen, Florida State (AP-2)

Punter

- Dave Smigelsky, Virginia Tech (AP-1)
- Bill Weimer, Northeast Louisiana (AP-2)
