= Jim Looney =

American football player (born 1957)

No. 50, 59
- Position: Linebacker

Personal information
- Born: August 18, 1957 (age 69); Bastrop, Louisiana, U.S.
- Listed height: 6 ft 0 in (1.83 m)
- Listed weight: 225 lb (102 kg)

Career information
- High school: Crenshaw (Los Angeles, California)
- College: Los Angeles Southwest (1977–1978); Purdue (1979–1980)
- NFL draft: 1981: undrafted

Career history
- San Francisco 49ers (1981); Arizona Wranglers (1983); Chicago Blitz (1983); Arizona Wranglers (1983); Chicago Blitz (1984); Orlando Renegades (1985)*
- * Offseason or practice squad member only

Awards and highlights
- First-team All-Big Ten (1980)
- Stats at Pro Football Reference

James Looney Jr. (born August 18, 1957) is an American former professional football player who was a linebacker for one season with the San Francisco 49ers of the National Football League (NFL). He played college football for the Purdue Boilermakers. Looney also played for the Arizona Wranglers and Chicago Blitz of the United States Football League (USFL).

== Early life and college ==
James Looney Jr. was born on August 18, 1957, in Bastrop, Louisiana. He attended Crenshaw High School in Los Angeles.

Looney first played college football at Los Angeles Southwest College from 1977 to 1978. He was a member of the Purdue Boilermakers of Purdue University from 1979 to 1980. He recorded one interception in 1979 and three interceptions in 1980. Looney earned Associated Press first-team All-Big Ten honors his senior year in 1980.

== Professional career ==
Looney signed with the San Francisco 49ers on May 9, 1981, after going undrafted in the 1981 NFL draft. He was released on August 17 but later re-signed on October 16. He played in one game for the 49ers during the 1981 season before being released on October 24, 1981.

Looney signed with the Arizona Wranglers of the United States Football League (USFL) on October 28, 1982. He was placed on injured reserve on March 16, 1983. He was later waived.

He was claimed off waivers by the Chicago Blitz on May 13, 1983. He was released on June 2 before appearing in a game.

Looney signed with Wranglers again on June 4, 1983. Overall, he played in six games, starting two, for the Wranglers during the 1983 USFL season.

He signed with the Blitz again in 1984, and played in one game before being released.

Looney was signed by the Orlando Renegades of the USFL for the 1985 season. He was released on January 18, 1985.
