= Marc May =

American football player (born 1956)

No. 88
- Position: Tight end

Personal information
- Born: January 1, 1956 (age 70); Chicago, Illinois, U.S.
- Listed height: 6 ft 4 in (1.93 m)
- Listed weight: 230 lb (104 kg)

Career information
- High school: South Shore (Chicago)
- College: Purdue (1973–1977)
- NFL draft: 1978: undrafted

Career history
- Joliet Fire (1978); Chicago Lions (1979–1982); Chicago Blitz (1983)*; Birmingham Stallions (1983)*; Chicago Blitz (1983); New Jersey Generals (1983); Lincolnwood Chargers (1984); Orlando Renegades (1985)*; Racine Gladiators (1985); DuPage Eagles (1986); Palos-Orland Force (1987); Minnesota Vikings (1987); Chicago Bruisers (1988); DuPage Eagles (1988–1990); Chicago Mavericks (1999)
- * Offseason or practice squad member only
- Stats at Pro Football Reference
- Stats at ArenaFan.com

Marc Edward May (born January 1, 1956) is an American former professional football tight end who played one season with the Minnesota Vikings of the National Football League (NFL). He played college football at Purdue University. He was also a member of the Chicago Blitz, Birmingham Stallions, New Jersey Generals, and Orlando Renegades of the United States Football League (USFL) and the Chicago Bruisers of the Arena Football League (AFL). May played for several semi-pro teams throughout his career as well.

== Early life and college ==
Marc Edward May was born on January 1, 1956, in Chicago, Illinois. He attended South Shore High School in Chicago.

May was a member of the Purdue Boilermakers of Purdue University from 1973 to 1977 as a wide receiver. He was a walk-on at Purdue and did not receive a scholarship during his entire time there. He did not catch a pass in college. Purdue head coach Alex Agase told May that he could move to tight end if he weighed more but May's weight in college never went above 180.

== Professional career ==
May added more weight to his frame after college and converted to tight end. Former Purdue teammate and Olympic sprinter Larry Burton also helped May increase his speed.

May went undrafted in the 1978 NFL draft. He had a tryout with the Los Angeles Rams in 1978 but was not signed. He then played semi-pro football for the Joliet Fire in 1978 and the Chicago Lions of the Northern States Football League from 1979 to 1982. After an impressive 40-yard dash time, he was offered a contract by the Dallas Cowboys in 1982 but failed his physical after a congenital defect in his spine was discovered during an X-ray.

May signed with the Chicago Blitz of the United States Football League (USFL) for the 1983 season. He was later cut by the Blitz and then signed by the USFL's Birmingham Stallions in early March 1983. However, he was also cut by the Stallions and then signed to the Blitz' developmental squad on March 4, 1983. The Journal and Courier reported that he played in ten games for the Blitz during the 1983 season before being traded to the New Jersey Generals in 1983. May played for the semi-pro Lincolnwood Chargers in 1984. He later spent time with the Orlando Renegades of the USFL before being released on January 17, 1985.

May then played semi-pro football for the Racine Gladiators in 1985, the DuPage Eagles in 1986, and the Palos-Orland Force in 1987. On September 26, 1987, he signed with the Minnesota Vikings during the 1987 NFL players strike. He started all three strike games for the Vikings, catching one pass for 22 yards. He was released on October 19, 1987, after the strike ended.

May then played in one game for the Chicago Bruisers of the Arena Football League (AFL) in 1988 and recorded one sack. He was a two-way player during his time in the AFL as the league played under ironman rules. He was listed as an offensive lineman/defensive lineman.

May played for the DuPage Eagles again from 1988 to 1990. He was inducted into the American Football Association Minor League Football Hall of Fame in 1992. He later played for the semi-pro Chicago Mavericks in 1999.

== Post-playing career ==
May was an assistant coach for the DuPage Eagles from 1991 to 1992 and the head coach of the semi-pro Chicago Thunder from 1994 to 1998. He was also the founder and head coach of the Chicago Mavericks from 1999 to 2000. He became the commissioner of the MidStates Football League in 2001. May later spent time as a high school football coach.
