= Larry Douglas (gridiron football) =

American gridiron football player

No. 87, 29, 84
- Position: Wide receiver

Personal information
- Born: April 26, 1957 (age 69); Independence, Louisiana, U.S.
- Listed height: 6 ft 1 in (1.85 m)
- Listed weight: 187 lb (85 kg)

Career information
- High school: Hammond (LA)
- College: Southern

Career history
- Pittsburgh Steelers (1979); Winnipeg Blue Bombers (1980); Chicago Blitz (1983); Arizona Wranglers (1983–84); Birmingham Stallions (1985–86)

Awards and highlights
- Super Bowl champion (XIV)

Larry "Juice" Douglas (born April 26, 1957) is an American former professional football player who was a wide receiver in the National Football League (NFL) for the Pittsburgh Steelers (1979), the Canadian Football League for the Winnipeg Blue Bombers (1980), and the United States Football League for three teams, including the Chicago Blitz (1983), Arizona Wranglers (1983–84), and Birmingham Stallions (1985–86). He played college football for the Southern Jaguars.

Douglas appeared for the Steelers in the 1979 preseason, but spent the regular season on injured reserve as Pittsburgh went on to win Super Bowl XIV.
