= Jeff Smith (wide receiver, born 1962) =

American gridiron football player (born 1962)

No. 87, 88, 80, 82
- Position: Wide receiver

Personal information
- Born: May 28, 1962 (age 64); Framingham, Massachusetts, U.S.
- Listed height: 6 ft 4 in (1.93 m)
- Listed weight: 180 lb (82 kg)

Career information
- High school: Poway (Poway, California)
- College: Cal Poly
- NFL draft: 1984: undrafted

Career history
- Winnipeg Blue Bombers (1984)*; Toronto Argonauts (1984); Orlando Renegades (1985); New York Jets (1987)*; Toronto Argonauts (1987); Winnipeg Blue Bombers (1988–1989); Ottawa Rough Riders (1990–1991); New England Patriots (1992)*; Orlando Predators (1993)*; Shreveport Pirates (1994)*
- * Offseason or practice squad member only

Awards and highlights
- Grey Cup champion (1988); First-team All-WFC (1983)

Jeffrey Jerome Smith (born May 28, 1962) is an American former professional football wide receiver who played five seasons in the Canadian Football League (CFL) and one season in the United States Football League (USFL).

== Early life ==
Jeffrey Jerome Smith was born on May 28, 1962, in Framingham, Massachusetts. He attended Poway High School in Poway, California. He graduated from Poway High in 1979.

== College career ==
The then-6-foot-3, 175-pound Smith transferred to Cal Poly in San Luis Obispo after former football rival Cal Poly Pomona dropped the sport following the fall of 1982. In his only season with the Mustangs on the Central Coast, Smith earned All-WFC first-team honors.

NCAA statistics
Year	Team	Rec.	Rec. Yds.	TD
1980	CPP	unknown	unknown	unknown
1981	CPP	33	481	1
1982	CPP	45	662	5
1983	CP	56	890	8

== Professional career ==
Smith signed with the Winnipeg Blue Bombers of the Canadian Football League (CFL) in 1984 but was later released.He then dressed in one game for the Toronto Argonauts during the 1984 CFL season before being released.

Smith was signed by the Orlando Renegades of the United States Football League (USFL) on February 1, 1985. He played in 14 games for the Renegades during the 1984 USFL season and caught 42 passes for 521 yards and one touchdown.

He signed with the New York Jets of the National Football League (NFL) on April 9, 1987, but was later released.

Smith then dressed in ten games for the Argonauts during the 1987 CFL season and recorded 25 receptions for 391 yards and two touchdowns.

In July 1988, before the start of the 1988 season, Smith and Tony Johns were traded to the Winnipeg Blue Bombers for Jeff Boyd and Ryan Hanson. Smith dressed in nine games for the Blue Bombers in 1988, totaling 39 catches for 436 yards and one touchdown. On November 27, 1988, the Blue Bombers won the 76th Grey Cup against the BC Lions by a score of 22–21. He dressed in nine games for the second straight year in 1989, recording 30 receptions for 358 yards and two touchdowns, 15 punt returns for 97 yards, and one tackle.

Smith dressed in ten games for the Ottawa Rough Riders of the CFL in 1990, catching 28 passes for 342 yards and three touchdowns. He spent the 1991 season on Ottawa's practice roster before being released in November 1991.

Smith signed with the New England Patriots of the NFL on May 2, 1992. However, he was later released.

He signed with the Orlando Predators of the Arena Football League in 1993 but was released before playing in any games.

Smith was signed by the CFL's Shreveport Pirates in 1994 but later released before dressing in any games.

== Personal life ==
Smith is the son of former longtime NFL assistant coach Jerry Smith.
