= Pacella =

Pacella is a surname. Notable people with the surname include:

- Dave Pacella (born 1960), American football player
- Elisabetta Pacella (born 1994), Italian field hockey player
- John Pacella (born 1956), American baseball player

== Fictional characters ==
- Marco Pacella, a character in the television series The 4400
