= Curtis Bledsoe =

American football player (born 1957)

No. 30
- Position: Running back

Personal information
- Born: March 19, 1957 (age 69); Odessa, Texas, U.S.

Career information
- College: San Diego State
- NFL draft: 1981: undrafted

Career history
- Kansas City Chiefs (1981–1982); Arizona Wranglers (1983); Washington Federals (1984); Orlando Renegades (1985)

Career NFL statistics
- Rushing attempts: 30
- Rushing yards: 85
- Average: 2.8
- Stats at Pro Football Reference

Curtis Kemp Bledsoe (born March 19, 1957, in Odessa, Texas) is an American former professional American football player who was a running back in the National Football League (NFL) for the Kansas City Chiefs in 1981 and 1982. He later played for the Arizona Wranglers, Washington Federals and Orlando Renegades of the USFL. Bledsoe played college football for the San Diego State Aztecs. Curtis is also an avid racquetball player and has played in a semi-professional capacity for many years under sponsorship by Wilson and others.

== Personal life ==
Curtis Bledsoe currently lives in Chula Vista, California, with his wife, Deborah Bledsoe. The Bledsoes have a daughter, Breanna Bledsoe, who currently attends the Howard University School of Law.

== Sources ==
- Professional statistics at Pro Football Reference
