= Tony Johns =

Jamaican gridiron football player (born 1960)

No. 21, 23
- Position: FB

Personal information
- Born: August 1, 1960 (age 66); Kingston, Jamaica
- Listed height: 6 ft 0 in (1.83 m)
- Listed weight: 223 lb (101 kg)

Career information
- College: Henderson State University

Career history
- 1985–1986: Montreal Concordes/Alouettes
- 1987: Toronto Argonauts
- 1988–1989: Winnipeg Blue Bombers

Awards and highlights
- Grey Cup champion (1988)

Tony Johns (born August 1, 1960) is a Jamaican former professional Canadian football fullback who played four seasons in the Canadian Football League (CFL) with the Montreal Concordes/Alouettes, Toronto Argonauts and Winnipeg Blue Bombers. He played college football at Henderson State University.

== Early life ==
Tony Johns was born on August 1, 1960, in Kingston, Jamaica. His family moved to Canada when he was 14. He attended Lorne Park Secondary School in Mississauga, Ontario, Canada. Johns ran track in high school and did not play football until his senior year. He had previously tried out for the football team at defensive end as a junior but did not make the team because he broke his ankle after a few practices. He was the football team's starting tailback his senior season. He scored two touchdowns during his first game. The team went undefeated with ten wins while Johns earned all-star honors.

== College career ==
Johns was a four-year letterman for the Henderson State Reddies of Henderson State University from 1981 to 1984. He carried 40 times for 167 yards and one touchdown as a freshman in 1981. He rushed 52 times for 181 yards and two touchdowns in 1982. As a senior in 1984, Johns totaled 108 carries for 459 yards and an Arkansas Intercollegiate Conference-leading seven touchdowns.

== Professional career ==
Johns was selected by the Montreal Concordes in the first round, with the fourth overall pick, of the 1985 CFL draft. He dressed in all 16 games for the Concordes during his rookie year in 1985, rushing 50 times for 194 yards and four touchdowns while also catching 13 passes for 123 yards. He dressed in 16 games for the newly-renamed Montreal Alouettes during the 1986 season, recording 87 carries for 386 yards and two touchdowns, and 23 catches for 127 yards and four touchdowns.

In April 1987, Johns and future considerations were traded to the Toronto Argonauts for Bob Bronk and Tony Antunovic. Johns dressed in 17 games for the Argonauts in 1987, totaling 48 rushing attempts for 171 yards and four touchdowns, 23 receptions for 156 yards and one touchdown, and three tackles.

In July 1988, before the start of the 1988 season, Johns and Jeff Smith were traded to the Winnipeg Blue Bombers for Jeff Boyd and Ryan Hanson. Johns dressed in 15 games in 1988, rushing 88 times for 294 yards and four touchdowns while also catching 21 passes for 229 yards. On November 27, 1988, the Blue Bombers won the 76th Grey Cup against the BC Lions by a score of 22–21. He missed the entire 1989 season after suffering a serious back injury in an auto accident. The next year, Johns failed his physical on June 28, 1990. A doctor had also advised Johns that it would be risky for him to try and play football again.
