= John Gillen =

John Gillen may refer to:

- John Gillen (judge)
- John Gillen (American football)
