= John Stadnik =

American football player (born 1959)

No. 67, 85
- Position: Offensive lineman

Personal information
- Born: February 18, 1959 (age 67); Chicago, Illinois, U.S.
- Listed height: 6 ft 4 in (1.93 m)
- Listed weight: 275 lb (125 kg)

Career information
- High school: Eisenhower (Blue Island, Illinois)
- College: Western Illinois (1979–1982)
- NFL draft: 1983: undrafted

Career history
- Seattle Seahawks (1983)*; Arizona Wranglers (1984); Arizona Outlaws (1985); San Diego Chargers (1987–1988)
- * Offseason or practice squad member only

Awards and highlights
- Second-team All-Mid-Continent Conference (1980)

Career NFL statistics
- Games played: 3
- Games started: 3
- Stats at Pro Football Reference

John Steven Stadnik (born February 18, 1959) is an American former professional football player who was an offensive lineman in the United States Football League (USFL) and National Football League (NFL). He played college football for the Western Illinois Leathernecks and later played for the USFL's Arizona Wranglers / Outlaws and the San Diego Chargers in the NFL. In his career, he played a total of 30 USFL games and three NFL games.

== Early life and college career ==
Stadnik was born on February 18, 1959, in Chicago, Illinois. He attended Eisenhower High School in Blue Island, Illinois, where he was a team captain, the football team's most valuable defensive tackle and an all-conference selection in 1977. He was the third alumnus in Eisenhower history (tied with Brian Glasgow who debuted the same week) to play in the National Football League (NFL).

Stadnik began attending Western Illinois University in 1979, although he did not see playing time for their Leatherneck football team that year. He earned his first letter in 1980 and became a starter at right tackle. He was named a second-team All-Mid-Continent Conference selection that season. As a junior in 1981, Stadnik was named honorable mention Little All-American by the Associated Press (AP). He remained a letterman at Western Illinois as a senior in 1982. He graduated from Western Illinois with a Bachelor of Science degree in commercial recreation and park administration.

== Professional career ==
Stadnik was selected by the Chicago Blitz in the 1983 USFL Territorial Draft. He went unselected in the 1983 NFL draft, but signed with the Seattle Seahawks as an undrafted free agent, turning down the Blitz's offer. He was released by the Seahawks on July 18, 1983. He signed with the Arizona Wranglers of the USFL on October 12, 1983.

Stadnik was placed on the developmental squad of the Wranglers on March 18, 1984, to begin the 1984 USFL season. He was later activated on April 1 after two games there. He appeared in 13 games for the Wranglers in 1984 at right tackle, 11 as a starter, helping them reach the league championship with a 10–8 record. He played with the Arizona Outlaws, a merger of the Wranglers and Oklahoma Outlaws, during the 1985 USFL season, appearing in 17 out of 18 games while they went 8–10.

Stadnik became a free agent when the USFL folded prior to their 1986 season. He returned to the NFL by signing with the San Diego Chargers on April 13, 1987. He missed time in preseason due to injury and was released by the team at the final roster cuts on August 29. On September 24, he was re-signed to the team as a replacement player during the NFL Players Association strike. He appeared in and started all three strike games for the Chargers at center, helping them win each game. Stadnik was among the first 20 alumni of Western Illinois to play in the NFL and was one of five active in the 1987 season. He was released at the end of the strike, on October 20, 1987. He was re-signed by the Chargers on March 4, 1988. He was released again on August 3, 1988, and did not sign with another team afterwards, ending his professional career with 30 USFL games played and three NFL games played.

== Personal life ==
With his wife, Debbie, Stadnik had four children, including two daughters and then twin sons. One of his daughters was a collegiate swimmer for the Gardner–Webb Runnin' Bulldogs while his two sons, Brock and Clayton, both were top high school football linemen and played with the South Carolina Gamecocks.
