= Trumaine Johnson =

Trumaine Johnson may refer to:

- Trumaine Johnson (cornerback), American football cornerback
- Trumaine Johnson (wide receiver), American football wide receiver
