= Jeff Brockhaus =

American football player (born 1959)

No. 5
- Position: Placekicker

Personal information
- Born: April 15, 1959 (age 67); Fort Lauderdale, Florida, U.S.
- Listed height: 6 ft 2 in (1.88 m)
- Listed weight: 218 lb (99 kg)

Career information
- High school: Brentwood (Brentwood, Missouri)
- College: Missouri
- NFL draft: 1981: undrafted

Career history
- Atlanta Falcons (1981)*; New York Jets (1982)*; New York Giants (1983)*; Houston Gamblers (1984); Jacksonville Bulls (1984); Orlando Renegades (1985); Minnesota Vikings (1986)*; San Francisco 49ers (1987)
- * Offseason or practice squad member only

Career NFL statistics
- Field goals: 3
- Field goal attempts: 6
- Field goal %: 50
- Longest field goal: 39
- Stats at Pro Football Reference

Jeffrey Jerome Brockhaus (born April 15, 1959) is an American former professional football placekicker. He played in the National Football League for the San Francisco 49ers for three games in 1987, as a replacement player during that year's NFL players' strike. He played collegiately at Missouri, and also played in the United States Football League for three different teams across two seasons.
