= Ken Times =

American football player (born 1956)

No. 60, 74, 77, 72, 67, 70
- Position: Defensive tackle

Personal information
- Born: January 1, 1956 (age 70); Deerfield Beach, Florida, U.S.
- Listed height: 6 ft 2 in (1.88 m)
- Listed weight: 246 lb (112 kg)

Career information
- High school: Deerfield Beach
- College: Southern
- NFL draft: 1980: 5th round, 112th overall pick

Career history
- San Francisco 49ers (1980); Winnipeg Blue Bombers (1980); Denver Broncos (1981)*; St. Louis Cardinals (1981); Washington Federals (1983)*; Tampa Bay Bandits (1983); Memphis Showboats (1984); Chicago Blitz (1984); Orlando Renegades (1985); Tampa Bay Bandits (1985)
- * Offseason or practice squad member only

Awards and highlights
- Second-team All-USFL (1983)
- Stats at Pro Football Reference

Kenneth Times (born January 1, 1956) is an American former professional football defensive tackle who played in the National Football League (NFL) and United States Football League (USFL). He played college football for the Southern Jaguars and was selected by the San Francisco 49ers in the fifth round of the 1980 NFL draft.

== Early life ==
Kenneth Times was born on January 1, 1956, in Deerfield Beach, Florida. He participated in high school football, basketball, and track at Deerfield Beach High School.

== College career ==
Times played college football for the Jaguars of Southern University, with his final year being in 1979. On November 8, 1979, it was reported that Times was leading the Jaguars in tackles with 106. He was a team captain. At the conclusion of his college career, Times played in the Sheridan All-Star game.

== Professional career ==
Times had a 4.6 second 40-yard dash. He was selected by the 49ers in the fifth round, with the 112th overall pick, of the 1980 NFL draft. He played in the first three games of the 1983 season in a reserve role behind Dwaine Board before being released on September 24, 1980.

Times signed with the Winnipeg Blue Bombers of the Canadian Football League on October 25, 1980. He played in the final game of the 1980 CFL season for Winnipeg but did not record any statistics. He became a free agent after the season and re-signed with the Blue Bombers in March 1981. Times was released on June 15, 1981, during the preseason.

Times then signed with the Denver Broncos. He was released on August 25, 1981, re-signed on August 27, and released again on August 31.

On November 25, 1981, Times was signed by the St. Louis Cardinals. He played in two games for the Cardinals in a backup role before being placed on injured reserve on December 10 with an ankle injury. He was released on August 31, 1982, after the third preseason game.

On January 21, 1983, Times signed with the Washington Federals of the United States Football League (USFL) for the 1983 USFL season. He was traded to the Tampa Bay Bandits on January 27. He appeared in 12 games, starting one, for the Bandits in 1983 while posting 26 solo tackles, 24 assisted tackles, and 11 sacks. Times was named second-team All-USFL for his performance during the 1983 season. He was the Bandits' designated rusher on passing downs, later stating "I made All-Pro off of one down — third down."

On February 20, 1984, Times was traded to the Memphis Showboats for center Lee North after Bandits defensive tackle Ron Simmons performed well during the preseason. Times played in four games, starting two, for Memphis before being waived on April 4, 1984.

Times was claimed off waivers by the Chicago Blitz on April 5, 1984. He appeared in six games for the Blitz and made six sacks. He was fined $1,200 for a rough hit on Steve Young. The Blitz folded after the 1984 season.

In December 1984, Times was selected by the Orlando Renegades in the 1984 USFL allocation draft. Times said he intentionally did not know the names of his offensive line teammates because he wanted to go "full-out" against them in practice. In January 1985, he broke his thumb, was knocked unconscious, and also hyperextended his foot. He recorded one sack and two fumbles recoveries for the Renegades during the 1985 season. At one point during his USFL career, Times was fined $400 for punching another player in the ribs.

On May 16, 1985, Times was traded to the Tampa Bay Bandits for two draft picks after a season-ending injury to Fred Nordgren. Times did not record any stats for the Bandits in 1985. The USFL folded after the 1985 season.
