= Trent Bryant =

American football player (born 1959)

No. 28, 45, 21, 24, 34, 17
- Position: Cornerback

Personal information
- Born: August 14, 1959 (age 67); Arkadelphia, Arkansas, U.S.
- Listed height: 5 ft 10 in (1.78 m)
- Listed weight: 180 lb (82 kg)

Career information
- High school: Arkadelphia
- College: Arkansas
- NFL draft: 1981: 10th round, 259 (by the Baltimore Colts)th overall pick

Career history
- Baltimore Colts (1981)*; Washington Redskins (1981); Kansas City Chiefs (1982–1983); Chicago Blitz (1984); Arizona Outlaws (1985); Los Angeles Express (1985); Saskatchewan Roughriders (1986-1987); Kansas City Chiefs (1987)
- * Offseason or practice squad member only

Career NFL statistics
- Interceptions: 2
- Stats at Pro Football Reference

Trent Baron Bryant (born August 14, 1959) is an American former professional football player who was a cornerback in the National Football League (NFL), Canadian Football League (CFL) and United States Football League (USFL). He played college football for the Arkansas Razorbacks. Bryant played for the Washington Redskins and Kansas City Chiefs in the NFL, the Chicago Blitz, Arizona Outlaws and Los Angeles Express in the USFL, and the Saskatchewan Roughriders in the CFL. He played in the first three games for the Chiefs in his final NFL season as a replacement player during the 1987 NFL Players Strike.
