= Bob Bronk =

Canadian football player (born 1959)

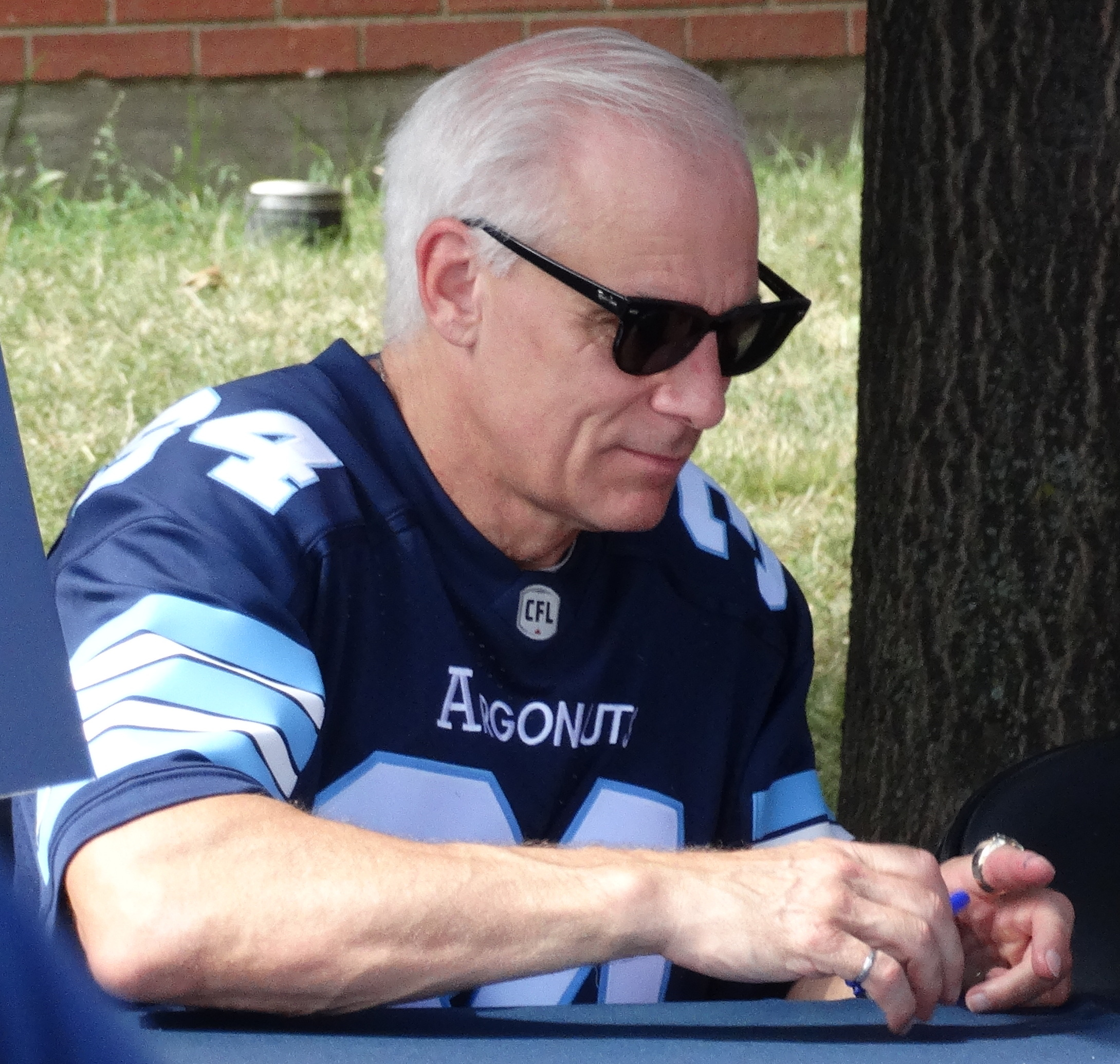
- Bronk signing autographs in 2022

No. 34
- Position: Fullback

Personal information
- Born: November 18, 1959 (age 66); Winnipeg, Manitoba, Canada
- Listed height: 6 ft 0 in (1.83 m)
- Listed weight: 215 lb (98 kg)

Career information
- University: Queen's

Career history
- Toronto Argonauts (1982–1986); Montreal Alouettes (1987)*
- * Offseason or practice squad member only

Awards and highlights
- Grey Cup champion (1983); CFL East All-Star (1985)

Bob Bronk (born November 18, 1959) is a Canadian former professional football fullback who played five seasons with the Toronto Argonauts of the Canadian Football League (CFL). He played CIAU football at Queen's University.

== Early life ==
Bob Bronk was born on November 18, 1959, in Winnipeg, Manitoba, Canada. Growing up, he played football for the East Side Eagles, East Kildonan Lions, and Winnipeg Rods. He played CIAU football for the Queen's Golden Gaels of Queen's University as a 21-year-old freshman in 1980.

== Professional career ==
Bronk was a territorial protection of the Toronto Argonauts in the 1981 CFL draft. He then returned to Queen's for his sophomore year in 1981, rushing 77 times for 528 yards and five touchdowns in five games. His 6.8 yards per carry was the highest in the country that year. Bronk graduated with a civil engineering degree in spring 1982. He officially signed with the Argonauts on March 17, 1982. Bronk missed the majority of the 1983 season after suffering torn knee ligaments. On November 27, 1983, the Argonauts won the 71st Grey Cup in Bronk's absence, beating the BC Lions by a score of 18–17. Bronk was named a CFL East All-Star in 1985. He dressed in 70 games overall for the Argonauts from 1982 to 1986, recording career totals of 108 carries for 419 yards and three touchdowns, and 134 receptions for 1,279 yards and eight touchdowns. He was regarded as an excellent blocker. Bronk requested a trade on March 26, 1987.

In April 1987, Bronk and Tony Antunovic were traded to the Montreal Alouettes for Tony Johns and future considerations. However, the Alouettes folded one day before the start of the regular season.

== Personal life ==
Bronk later became the president of the Canadian Football League Alumni Association. He has also served as the CEO of the Ontario Construction Secretariat.

Bronk, his son, and his father have all competed in the Manitoba Marathon.
