= Joey Walters =

American gridiron football player (born 1954)

Profile
- Positions: Slotback, wide receiver

Personal information
- Born: October 29, 1954 (age 72); Florence, South Carolina, U.S.

Career information
- College: Clemson University

Career history
- 1977–1978: Winnipeg Blue Bombers
- 1978–1982: Saskatchewan Roughriders
- 1983–1984: Washington Federals
- 1985: Orlando Renegades
- 1987: Houston Oilers

Awards and highlights
- 2× CFL All-Star (1981, 1982)
- Stats at Pro Football Reference

Joey Walters (born October 29, 1954) is an American former professional football slotback and wide receiver who played in the Canadian Football League (CFL), United States Football League (USFL), and National Football League (NFL). He played college football at Clemson University.

== Early career ==
Walters played football at West Florence High School. In 2006, he was inducted into the Florence Area Hall of Fame.

== Clemson ==
Walters played for the Clemson Tigers from 1973 to 1976 under head coach Red Parker. He served as co-captain in the 1976 season and caught 26 passes (6th overall in the ACC) for 392 yards and two touchdowns.

== Canadian Football League ==
=== Winnipeg Blue Bombers ===
Walters started his professional career in 1977 with the Winnipeg Blue Bombers. He played in four games, catching six passes for 59 yards, before being traded to the Saskatchewan Roughriders.

=== Saskatchewan Roughriders ===
He finished the remaining 10 games of the 1977 season with the Roughriders, catching 23 more balls for 404 yards and four touchdowns. Walters would go on to play five more seasons in Saskatchewan, culminating in back-to-back West and CFL All-Star honors from 1981 to 1982.

Walters left the Roughriders and the CFL in 1982, but he is still widely regarded as one of the greatest players in team history. In 1990, he was inducted into the team's Plaza of Honor.

== United States Football League ==
In 1983, Walters signed with the Washington Federals of the USFL. He spent three years with the team, including the 1985 season when they moved to Florida and became the Orlando Renegades. Walters' best season was in 1984, when he caught 98 passes for 1410 yards and 13 touchdowns. Although the Federals had a 12-42 record over the USFL's three seasons, Walters' performance was enough to merit him Honorable Mention honors on the USFL All-Time Team.

== National Football League ==
Two years after the USFL folded, Walters signed with the Houston Oilers as a replacement player during the 1987 NFL strike. In just five games, he caught five passes for 99 yards while also helping out in the return game.

== Post-football career ==
After he was done playing football, Walters was employed by Davgar Restaurants, serving as the company's Marketing Manager before being promoted to Director of Marketing. He also worked with Burger King Corporation as a marketing representative for the Southeast Region.

Since 2000, he has worked with Florida Citrus Sports, a not-for-profit organization in Orlando, Florida, that produces sports events such as the Capital One Bowl and Champs Sports Bowl. Walters handles operations and team support, coordinating with football operations officials from the participating bowl schools on practices and game day needs. In addition, he is the director of the Florida Classic, the annual showdown between the Bethune–Cookman Wildcats and the Florida A&M Rattlers that is currently the nation's largest HBCU football game. Florida Citrus Sports manages the Florida Classic on behalf of the two schools.

Walters is also the director of FCSports' summer camp program, a cornerstone of the company's Foundation. The Summer Camp is a free camp for low-income families in Central Florida and focuses on promoting the "Four A's" – Athletics, Academics, Attitude and Achievement.

== Personal life ==
Walters resides in Winter Springs, Florida, with his wife, Patricia, and their son, Leo.
