= Jeff Gabrielson =

American football player (born 1958)

Profile
- Position: Linebacker

Personal information
- Born: August 11, 1958 (age 68); Milwaukee, Wisconsin
- Listed height: 6 ft 2 in (1.88 m)
- Listed weight: 240 lb (109 kg)

Career information
- High school: Madison
- College: Ripon
- NFL draft: 1981: undrafted

Career history
- Montreal Alouettes (1981); Ottawa Rough Riders (1982); Toronto Argonauts (1982); Philadelphia Stars (1983–1984); Chicago Blitz (1984); Orlando Renegades (1985)

Jeffrey Louis Gabrielson (born August 11, 1958) is an American former football linebacker who played five seasons professionally. After playing college football at Ripon College, he was a member of the Montreal Alouettes (1981), Ottawa Rough Riders (1982) and Toronto Argonauts (1982) of the Canadian Football League (CFL), then playing for the Philadelphia Stars (1983–1984), Chicago Blitz (1984) and Orlando Renegades of the United States Football League (USFL).
