= Jerry Doerger =

American football player (born 1960)

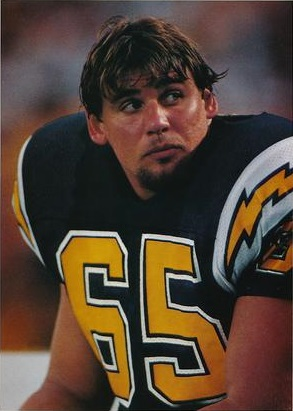
- Doerger c. 1985

No. 72, 78, 70, 65
- Position: Center

Personal information
- Born: July 18, 1960 (age 66); Cincinnati, Ohio, U.S.
- Listed height: 6 ft 5 in (1.96 m)
- Listed weight: 270 lb (122 kg)

Career information
- High school: La Salle (Cincinnati, Ohio)
- College: Wisconsin
- NFL draft: 1982: 8th round, 200th overall pick

Career history
- Chicago Bears (1982); Chicago Blitz (1984); Orlando Renegades (1985); San Diego Chargers (1985)

Career NFL statistics
- Games played: 10
- Stats at Pro Football Reference

Jerry Doerger (born Jerome William Doerger) is a former center in the National Football League (NFL). Doerger was selected by the Chicago Bears in the eighth round of the 1982 NFL draft and played that season with the team. He would later play with the Orlando Renegades of the United States Football League (USFL) during the 1985 USFL season before again playing in the NFL with the San Diego Chargers during the 1985 NFL season. Jerry was initiated into the Alpha Xi chapter of Pi Kappa Alpha in the spring of 2011.
