= Kevin Kellin =

American football player (born 1959)

No. 75
- Position: Defensive tackle

Personal information
- Born: November 16, 1959 (age 66); Hampton, Virginia, U.S.
- Listed height: 6 ft 6 in (1.98 m)
- Listed weight: 267 lb (121 kg)

Career information
- High school: Grand Rapids (Grand Rapids, Minnesota)
- College: Minnesota
- NFL draft: 1983: undrafted

Career history
- Washington Redskins (1983)*; Washington Federals (1984); Orlando Renegades (1985); Tampa Bay Buccaneers (1986–1988)
- * Offseason or practice squad member only

Career NFL statistics
- Sacks: 5.5
- Stats at Pro Football Reference

Kevin Kellin (born November 16, 1959) is an American former professional football player who was a defensive tackle in the National Football League (NFL) and United States Football League (USFL). He played college football for the Minnesota Golden Gophers. He played in the NFL for the Tampa Bay Buccaneers from 1986 to 1988.
