= Jeff Sevy =

American football player (born 1950)

No. 75, 70
- Positions: Offensive tackle, offensive guard, defensive line

Personal information
- Born: October 24, 1950 (age 76); Palo Alto, California, U.S.
- Listed height: 6 ft 5 in (1.96 m)
- Listed weight: 260 lb (118 kg)

Career information
- High school: Homestead (Cupertino, California)
- College: California
- NFL draft: 1974: 12th round, 290th overall pick

Career history
- The Hawaiians (1974); Chicago Bears (1975–1978); Seattle Seahawks (1979–1980); Washington Federals (1983–1984)

Awards and highlights
- PFWA All-Rookie Team (1975)

Career NFL statistics
- GP / GS: 73 / 33
- Sacks: 2
- FR: 3
- Receptions: 1
- Rec. yards: 6
- Stats at Pro Football Reference

Jeffrey Evan Sevy (/ˈsiːviː/ SEE-vee; born October 24, 1950) was a lineman for six years in the National Football League (NFL). In his amateur years, he played at Homestead High School then went to De Anza College before transferring to Cal. He was selected by the Chicago Bears in the 12th round of the 1974 NFL draft. He played for the Bears for four seasons before ending his NFL career with the Seattle Seahawks in 1979 and 1980. Sevy also played for The Hawaiians of the World Football League (WFL) in 1974 and the Washington Federals of the USFL in 1983 and 1984.
