= Mike Fisher (American football) =

American football player (born 1958)

No. 26, 81, 80
- Position: Wide receiver

Personal information
- Born: April 22, 1958 (age 68); Gatesville, Texas, U.S.
- Listed height: 5 ft 11 in (1.80 m)
- Listed weight: 172 lb (78 kg)

Career information
- High school: Gatesville
- College: Baylor
- NFL draft: 1981: 8th round, 198th overall pick

Career history
- St. Louis Cardinals (1981); Los Angeles Raiders (1982)*; Washington Federals (1983–1984)
- * Offseason or practice squad member only
- Stats at Pro Football Reference

James Michael Fisher (born April 22, 1958) is an American former professional football player who was a wide receiver for the St. Louis Cardinals of the National Football League (NFL) in 1981. He played college football for the Baylor Bears.

Fisher also competed for the Baylor Bears track and field team as a sprinter in the NCAA.
