= Harold Randolph =

American gridiron football player (born 1956)

Profile
- Position: Linebacker

Personal information
- Born: January 28, 1956 (age 70); Greenville, North Carolina, U.S.
- Listed height: 6 ft 2 in (1.88 m)
- Listed weight: 215 lb (98 kg)

Career information
- High school: Junius H. Rose (NC)
- College: East Carolina
- NFL draft: 1978: 6th round, 166th overall pick

Career history
- Dallas Cowboys (1978)*; Toronto Argonauts (1978); Edmonton Eskimos (1980)*; Montreal Alouettes (1981); Washington Federals (1984); Orlando Renegades (1985)
- * Offseason or practice squad member only

Awards and highlights
- 2× All-SoCon (1976, 1977); All-Southern Independent (1977)

James Harold Randolph (born January 28, 1956) is an American former football linebacker in the United States Football League (USFL) for the Washington Federals. He also was a member of the Toronto Argonauts and Montreal Alouettes in the Canadian Football League (CFL). He played college football at East Carolina University.

== Early life ==
Randolph entered Third Street School in Greenville, NC in 1964 among the first African-American students at the previously all white elementary school. He and his family were forerunners of racial integration in this eastern NC town.

Randolph attended Junius H. Rose High School, where he practiced football.

He walked-on at East Carolina University. As a sophomore, he became a starter at linebacker in a 5-2 defensive alignment. As a senior, he set a school record with 166 tackles (124 solo), leading the team in tackles for the third straight season.

Randolph finished his college career with 493 tackles (school record), 4 interceptions, 12 pass deflections and one fumble recovery.

In 2013, he was inducted into the East Carolina Athletics Hall of Fame.

== Professional career ==
=== Dallas Cowboys ===
Randolph was selected by the Dallas Cowboys in the sixth round (166th overall) of the 1978 NFL draft. He was waived on August 24.

=== Toronto Argonauts ===
In September 1978, he was signed as a free agent by the Toronto Argonauts of the Canadian Football League. He is known for tackling the Calgary Stampeders Ray Odums from the sidelines, as he was returning an interception for a touchdown.

=== Edmonton Eskimos ===
On April 11, 1980, he was signed by the Edmonton Eskimos of the Canadian Football League. He was released before the start of the season.

=== Montreal Alouettes ===
In 1981, he was signed as a free agent by the Montreal Alouettes of the Canadian Football League. He was released on August 21.

=== Washington Federals/Orlando Renegades ===
In 1983, he was signed as a free agent by the Washington Federals of the United States Football League. At the end of the 1984 season, the franchise was moved to Orlando and was renamed as the Orlando Renegades. Randolph played until the league folded in 1986.
