= Greg Taylor (American football) =

American football player (born 1958)

No. 45, 83
- Positions: Running back, wide receiver

Personal information
- Born: October 23, 1958 (age 68); Richmond, Virginia, U.S.
- Listed height: 5 ft 8 in (1.73 m)
- Listed weight: 175 lb (79 kg)

Career information
- High school: Highland Springs (Henrico County, Virginia)
- College: Virginia (1977–1981)
- NFL draft: 1982: 12th round, 308th overall pick

Career history
- New England Patriots (1982); Montreal Concordes (1983)*; Washington Federals (1984)
- * Offseason or practice squad member only
- Stats at Pro Football Reference

Gregory O'Neil Taylor (born October 23, 1958) is an American former professional football running back who played one season with the New England Patriots of the National Football League (NFL). He was selected by the Patriots in the 12th round of the 1982 NFL draft after playing college football at the University of Virginia. He also played for the Washington Federals of the United States Football League (USFL).

== Early life ==
Gregory O'Neil Taylor was born on October 23, 1958, in Richmond, Virginia. He played high school football at Highland Springs High School in Henrico County, Virginia. He helped the team to a 33–3 record during his final three seasons.

== College career ==
Taylor was a letterman for the Virginia Cavaliers of the University of Virginia in 1977, 1978, 1979, and 1981. He rushed 17 times for 67 yards as a freshman in 1977 while also catching eight passes for 67 yards. In 1978, he recorded 138 carries for 551 yards and three touchdowns, and ten receptions for 64 yards. Taylor ran for a career-high 933 yards and nine touchdowns on 166 carries in 1979 while catching nine passes for 182 yards and two touchdowns. He missed the entire 1980 season due to a hamstring injury. He was converted to flanker his senior year in 1981. That season, Taylor totaled 36 rushing attempts for 102 yards, 25 receptions for 418 yards and three touchdowns, six kick returns for 164 yards, and six punt returns for 44 yards. He also attempted two incomplete passes for two interceptions during his college career.

== Professional career ==
Taylot was selected by the New England Patriots in the 12th round, with the 308th overall pick, of the 1982 NFL draft. He officially signed with the team on May 12. He played in one game for the Patriots during the 1982 season, returning two kicks for 46 yards. He left the game after suffering a leg injury on his second kick return. The next day, the Patriots told Taylor it was a bone bruise. He was released a few days later on September 16, 1982.

Taylor then signed with the Montreal Concordes of the Canadian Football League on September 21, 1982. He had a workout with the Concordes that same day, during which his leg gave way. X-rays revealed that he had suffered a hairline fracture of his leg. In October 1982, Taylor sued the Patriots, claiming that they knew of his broken leg but did not tell him. On June 21, 1983, it was reported that Taylor had been released by the Concordes.

Taylor signed with the Washington Federals of the United States Football League (USFL) on October 12, 1983. He played for the Federals during the 1984 USFL season as a wide receiver, totaling 37 receptions for 487 yards and four touchdowns, 22 kick returns for 537 yards and one touchdown, and one carry for negative 16 yards. He was released by the newly-renamed Orlando Renegades on January 18, 1985.
