= Mark Keel =

American football player (born 1961)

No. 83, 82, 80, 85
- Position: Tight end

Personal information
- Born: October 1, 1961 (age 65); Fort Worth, Texas, U.S.
- Listed height: 6 ft 4 in (1.93 m)
- Listed weight: 228 lb (103 kg)

Career information
- High school: Clover Park (Lakewood, Washington)
- College: Arizona
- NFL draft: 1983: 9th round, 240th overall pick

Career history
- Arizona Wranglers (1983); Chicago Blitz (1984); Jacksonville Bulls (1985); New England Patriots (1986); Seattle Seahawks (1987); Kansas City Chiefs (1987); Green Bay Packers (1989)*
- * Offseason or practice squad member only

Career NFL statistics
- Receptions: 8
- Receiving yards: 97
- Touchdowns: 1
- Stats at Pro Football Reference

Mark Anthony Keel (born October 1, 1961) is an American former professional football player who was a tight end in the National Football League (NFL) for the Kansas City Chiefs and Seattle Seahawks. He played college football for the Arizona Wildcats. He also played in the United States Football League (USFL) for the Arizona Wranglers, Chicago Blitz, and Jacksonville Bulls. He was selected by the New England Patriots in the ninth round (240th overall) of the 1983 NFL Draft.
