= Orlando Renegades =

Defunct American professional football team

General information
- Founded: 1982
- Folded: 1986
- Headquartered: Florida Citrus Bowl in Orlando, Florida
- Colors: 1983-84: Kelly Green, Black, Silver, White 1985: Navy Blue, Red, White

Personnel
- General manager: Bugsy Engelberg (1985)
- Head coach: 1983–1984 Ray Jauch (4–15); 1984 Dick Bielski (3–14); 1985 Lee Corso (5–13)

Team history
- Washington Federals (1983–1984); Orlando Renegades (1985)

Home fields
- RFK Stadium (1983–1984); Florida Citrus Bowl (1985)

League / conference affiliations
- United States Football League (1983–1985): Eastern Conference (1984–1985); Atlantic Division (1983–1984)

The Orlando Renegades were a professional American football team that played in Orlando, Florida, in the United States Football League (USFL) for a single season in 1985. Before its season in Orlando, the franchise played in Washington, D.C., as the Washington Federals for two seasons, in 1983 and 1984.

The franchise was the worst in the USFL in terms of both game play – a combined record of 7 wins and 29 losses, and attendance during its two seasons in Washington, prompting the move to Orlando. In Orlando, attendance was better and the team's performance on the field began to improve over the course of the season despite a 5–13 record, but the USFL folded before the team could play a second season in Orlando.

== In Washington ==
=== Creation of the franchise ===
United States Football League founder Donald Dixon was a strong proponent of a USFL franchise in Washington, D.C., and insisted on one despite the dominance of the National Football League′s Washington Redskins in the Washington market. Real estate magnate Marvin Warner originally was slated to own the Federals, but when the USFL announced it was fielding a team in his hometown of Birmingham, Alabama – the team which became the Birmingham Stallions – Warner opted to take that franchise instead. The USFL then turned to prominent Washington attorney Berl Bernhard. He stood atop a murky ownership structure. The franchise was held by a limited partnership, Washington Football Partners, which was organized in the District of Columbia on August 20, 1982, with Bernhard's Capital City Sports Management as general partner. In turn, Washington Football Partners was owned by a joint venture that was operated by three corporations.

Financial projections submitted to potential investors in Washington Football Partners foresaw the Federals losing $1.12 million during the 1983 season, with anticipated revenues of $4.13 million – including $2.6 million in ticket sales – and expenses of just over $5.25 million. The Federals' efforts were severely hobbled when the Redskins won Super Bowl XVII on January 30, 1983 – their first NFL championship since 1942 – only 36 days before the Federals′ first game. The Federals' already sluggish ticket sales dried up almost completely.

The Federals played in Robert F. Kennedy Memorial Stadium in Washington, D.C. However, under pressure from the Redskins, the city refused to grant the Federals full access to its facilities. They were forced to practice on a small practice field across the street from a prison.

=== 1983 season ===
The team lured Ray Jauch to be its head coach; he had previously guided the Edmonton Eskimos and Winnipeg Blue Bombers to success in the Canadian Football League. At the time he was the fourth-winningest coach in CFL history. The Federals initially made a splash by signing running back Craig James, one half of the famous "Pony Express" backfield at SMU.

More than any other team in the league, the Federals seemed dogged by inconsistency, bad timing, and terrible luck. A week before the season even began, their player personnel expert bolted to the NFL's New York Jets. The team changed quarterbacks almost weekly, with in-game quarterback changes in a number of games. Jauch's biggest mistake was probably giving the opening day starter, NFL veteran Kim McQuilken, the quick hook for rookie quarterback Mike Hohensee. From there the team never seemed to settle in with a quarterback for more than a few games in a row, and when McQuilken did play, he often pressed, forcing his throws into coverage. The team alternated between McQuilken and Hohensee, with occasional appearances by former Pittsburgh Steelers quarterback "Jefferson Street" Joe Gilliam, who was far past his prime; he had last played a meaningful professional down in 1975, and he only threw for 673 yards. The only other quarterback on the team was rookie Mike Forslund, who never played.

Injuries also dogged the team. James was sidelined for five games with a fractured vertebra. Hohensee only played in nine games all season. At one point, all of the Federals′ receivers had leg injuries. The Federals had good linebackers in Joe Harris, Dan Lloyd, and Jeff McIntyre, who was Washington's best outside linebacker and could cover receivers downfield and stop the run. McIntyre lead the team in tackles and sacks until an ankle injury sidelined him for the final six games.

The first game in franchise history was a portent of things to come; the Federals were drilled at RFK Stadium 28–7 by the Chicago Blitz, the preseason title favorites coached by former Washington Redskins coach George Allen. The game was played on March 6, 1983. The Blitz, led by former Detroit Lions and Baltimore Colts quarterback Greg Landry, raced out to a 28–0 lead. The Blitz held Washington to only one first down and a mere 24 yards total offense in the first half; Chicago led 21–0 before the Federals even recorded a second first down. By that time, Landry had hit 15 of his first 17 pass attempts, including a 23-yard touchdown pass to Trumaine Johnson. McQuilken had a horrible debut as the Federals quarterback and was replaced by back-up Hohensee; Hohensee accounted for the Federals only score, a 19-yard pass to Walker Lee. (The only positive was the attendance of 38,007; unfortunately, this was more than double what the Feds would draw in any of their 17 other games played in Washington.)

The next week went even worse for Washington, as quarterback Hohensee, James, and wide receiver Reggie Smith all were injured. McQuilken could only muster three points of offense, while throwing two more interceptions.

In Week 3, the Federals led the Boston Breakers 16–9 with less than five minutes to go in regulation. However, two bad snaps on special teams led to a 19–16 loss.

Playing at home in Week 4, the Federals finally got a victory. They managed to defeat the Michigan Panthers, one of the better teams in the USFL and the eventual 1983 league champions. The Panthers were led by future NFL quarterback Bobby Hebert, and wide receiver Anthony Carter, one of the fastest players in the league. Federals quarterback Kim McQuilken had one of his better games, completing 24 of 48 passes and throwing for 324 yards. He threw three touchdown passes and gave up only one interception, by Panthers linebacker Robert Pennywell; it led to a game-tying score on a pass from Hebert to Derek Holloway. The game went into overtime, during which Washington won on a 22-yard pass from McQuilken to Joey Walters.

In Week 6, the Federals led the Arizona Wranglers 21–16, only to have a potential game-sealing drive stall on the Wranglers′ 2-yard-line. The Wranglers' first play from scrimmage after that was a 98-yard touchdown pass – the longest in USFL history.

The Federals saved their best game for last in the 1983 season, playing at home against the Philadelphia Stars. The Stars, who entered the game with a record of 15–2, were a dominant team who had crushed Washington 34–3 earlier in the season. At first, it seemed like it was going to be another blow-out loss for the Federals, who entered the game with a record of 3–14. The Stars, led by all-league quarterback Chuck Fusina, built a 14–0 lead in the first half, but McQuilken hit Stan Rome with a 19-yard touchdown pass to cut Philadelphia's lead to 14–6 at halftime. In the second half, Federals rookie linebacker Mike Corvino helped stop two late Stars drives with a sack and an interception. Former New York Giants running back Billy Taylor got in on the scoring for Washington with a six-yard run in the third quarter, and the Federals added two points on the conversation. McQuilken scored his first touchdown as a pro with a one-yard run for the go-ahead score in the fourth quarter. Lane had his best day ever as a professional, catching 17 passes for 170 yards, and the Federals shocked the league by defeating the Stars 21–14.

The Federals finished with a record of 4–14, in last place in the USFL's Atlantic Division and tied with the Arizona Wranglers – against whom they finished 1–1–0 for the year – for the worst record in the league. The only USFL all-star on the team was reserve running back Eric Robinson, whose kickoff return for touchdown vs. the Tampa Bay Bandits at RFK Stadium was the only kickoff return for a touchdown in the USFL in 1983.

Despite initial fears at the season's start that they had little going for them other than James – who rushed for 823 yards during the season – the Federals were far more competitive in 1983 than their 4–14 record indicated. Eight of their losses were by a touchdown or less. They had a fair amount of offensive talent and skill players with comparatively good depth, and they finished the season third in the league in passing attempts. The Federals had pulled off an upset win over the Atlantic Division champion Philadelphia Stars to complete the season and had defeated both teams – Philadelphia and Michigan – who played in the 1983 USFL championship game. In spite of a tremendous number of on-field mistakes, the Federals might have been almost a .500 team – and perhaps even a 12–6 team – with just a few lucky breaks. The Federals had started the season 1–13, but they had a strong finish going 3–1 in the last four games, and it appeared that the Federals had finally learned how to turn a close game into a win. The franchise had grounds for optimism as it considered its prospects for its second season in 1984.

The Federals' marketing efforts were crippled by the Redskins' Super Bowl victory only 36 days before the Federals′ first game. Washington-area fans largely viewed the Federals with indifference, and the Federals averaged only 13,800 fans per game in 1983 in a 56,000-seat stadium. Revenue from ticket sales amounted to no more than a third of the $2.6 million projected before the season. Even after taking on several investors who had initially tried to get a USFL franchise for Cleveland, the Federals were still starved for capital. Years later, Bernhard said that he had seriously underestimated the expenses associated with pro football.

=== 1984 season ===
Despite losing millions of dollars in 1983, Bernhard was committed to another season in Washington. The Federals had a lot of reasons for optimism in 1984. The 1983 team had played with heart under Jauch, taking better teams down to the wire even at the end of the season. The USFL added six new teams for the 1984 season, and with the league-wide talent pool expected to be diluted by expansion, the 1984 schedule seemed likely to include a number of very winnable games. With McQuilken's post-season retirement, the team had an undisputed and seemingly capable starter at quarterback in Hohensee. The Birmingham Stallions' acquisition of Cliff Stoudt made their 1983 quarterback Reggie Collier available, and the Federals added him for depth in 1984 alongside Hohensee and rookie Lou Pagley. Star running back Craig James had recovered from his 1983 injury and was healthy for 1984. It seemed like the pitfalls that Jauch had fallen into in the first season might be missed this time around. Player familiarity with the system and their teammates and having a proven winner like Jauch as a coach suggested the Federals were bound to deliver better results in 1984.

Unfortunately, the 1984 season unraveled in a hurry. The league scheduled the Federals to open against the expansion Jacksonville Bulls, probably in an effort to help the get the Federals off to a good start with an easy win. Unfortunately, that plan backfired; hours before the game, the Federals hobbled their defense by cutting all three of their starting linebackers, and the Bulls crushed the Federals 53–14. "We played like a group of untrained gerbils," Bernhard said after the game. In an effort to save face, Bernhard fired Jauch three days after the game and replaced him with his offensive coordinator, former Maryland Terrapins and Dallas Cowboys running back Dick Bielski.

In Week 2 James suffered a season-ending injury. His frequent injuries had disappointed the Federals. For his part, James wanted to play before larger crowds than the Federals could draw. A little over a month into the season, the Federals granted James his release to allow him to sign with the NFL's New England Patriots.

Although the defense was awful throughout the season, the offense was respectable in the last 12 games or so. Hohensee played fairly well for a second-year starter and finished the season with a very respectable – by USFL standards – passer rating of 72.2. Halfback Curtis Bledsoe replaced James as the team's featured running back, rushing for a respectable 1,080 yards and seven touchdowns in 1984. Wide receiver Joey Walters caught 98 passes for 1,410 yards and seven touchdowns and made The Sporting News 1984 USFL All-Star Team, becoming the Federals' main star.

Despite the successes of Hohensee, Bledsoe, and Walters, Washington opened the season with eight straight losses and suffered humiliating defeats at the hands of all six expansion teams; among their season lowlights were two losses to the expansion Pittsburgh Maulers, who won only three games all season. The Federals finished with a record 3–15, tied with the Maulers for both last place in the USFL's Atlantic Division and the worst record in the league.

Fan support dwindled further; the Federals only averaged 7,700 fans per game in 1984, well below 1983's disappointing average. The home opener drew almost 26,000 fewer fans than the 1983 opener; it nonetheless was the biggest home crowd of the season. On April 14 the Federals offered free T-shirts to the first 10,000 fans through the turnstiles for a game against the Oklahoma Outlaws, but only 6,075 showed up, and the crowd of 4,432 who came to RFK Stadium to watch the Federals play the Memphis Showboats on May 6 during a day-long rainstorm was the smallest crowd in USFL history at the time.

==== 1984 Washington Federals schedule and results ====
Week	Date	Opponent	Result	Record	Venue	Attendance
Preseason
1	Bye					
2	February 4	vs. Tampa Bay Bandits	L 9–28	0–1	Fort Lauderdale, Florida	17,225
3	February 11	vs. Pittsburgh Maulers	L 7–31	0–2	Melbourne, Florida	6,000
4	February 17	vs. New Jersey Generals	L 24–27	0–3	Orlando, Florida	3,784
Regular season
1	February 26	at Jacksonville Bulls	L 14–53	0–1	Gator Bowl Stadium	49,392
2	March 4	Philadelphia Stars	L 6–17	0–2	RFK Stadium	12,067
3	March 12	at Arizona Wranglers	L 7–37	0–3	Sun Devil Stadium	25,218
4	March 18	Pittsburgh Maulers	L 7–16	0–4	RFK Stadium	10,121
5	March 25	at New Jersey Generals	L 6–43	0–5	Giants Stadium	38,075
6	March 31	Chicago Blitz	L 20–21	0–6	RFK Stadium	7,373
7	April 9	at Houston Gamblers	L 13–31	0–7	Houston Astrodome	16,710
8	April 14	Oklahoma Outlaws	L 16–20	0–8	RFK Stadium	6,075
9	April 22	at Oakland Invaders	W 31–17	1–8	Oakland–Alameda County Coliseum	14,828
10	April 28	at Tampa Bay Bandits	L 19–37	1–9	Tampa Stadium	42,810
11	May 6	Memphis Showboats	L 10–13 (OT)	1–10	RFK Stadium	4,432
12	May 11	New Jersey Generals	W 31–17	2–10	RFK Stadium	11,367
13	May 20	San Antonio Gunslingers	L 14–30	2–11	RFK Stadium	6,159
14	May 27	at Pittsburgh Maulers	L 6–15	2–12	Three Rivers Stadium	15,153
15	June 3	Los Angeles Express	L 21–35	2–13	RFK Stadium	5,263
16	June 10	at Birmingham Stallions	L 21–42	2–14	Legion Field	22,100
17	June 15	at Philadelphia Stars	L 8–31	2–15	Veterans Stadium	22,582
18	June 24	New Orleans Breakers	W 20–17	3–15	RFK Stadium	6,386

==== 1984 Washington Federals opening day roster ====
Washington Federals 1984 Opening Day Roster (at 26-Feb-84)
Quarterbacks: 10 Reggie Collier; 9 Mike Hohensee; Running backs: 32 Craig James RB; 40 Eric Robinson RB/KR; 38 Billy Taylor FB; 35 Rickey Claitt FB; Wide receivers: 17 Joey Walters; 7 Ricky Simmons; 82 Mike Harris; 83 Greg Taylor	Offensive linemen: 69 Joel Patten LT; 77 Jeff Sevy RT; 76 David Sullivan OT; 60 Dave Pacella LG; 64 Ed Fulton RG; 65 Chuck Slaughter G; 61 James Farr G; 53 Brian Musselman C/LS; 57 Tony Loia C; Defensive linemen: 92 Bennie Smith LDT; 78 Gurnest Brown RDT; 63 Ed Jackson DT; 74 Robert Cobb LDE; 99 Richard Tharpe RDE; 71 Mike Matocha DE	Linebackers: 50 Ben Apuna LLB; 51 Mike Muller MLB; 52 Joe Hines RLB; 58 Mike Corvino LB; 59 Harold Randolph LB; 55 Darnell Dailey LB; 56 Danny Triplett LB; Defensive backs: 36 Jeff Brown LCB; 29 D. D. Hoggard RCB; 21 Victor Jackson FS; 33 Greg Jones FS; 44 Mike Guess SS; 37 Dennis Coit SS; Special teams: 6 Sandro Vitiello K; 8 Dana Moore P	Developmental squad: 16 Lou Pagley QB; 23 Curtis Bledsoe RB; 88 Randy Burke WR; 86 Charles Chisley WR; 80 Mike Fisher WR; 81 Lonnie Harris WR; 93 Kevin Kellin DE; 54 Bernard West LB; 47 Mike Thurman DB; 24 Willie Holley CB; rookies in italics 40 Active, 10 Developmental

==== 1984 Washington Federals final roster ====
Washington Federals 1984 Final Roster (at 24-Jun-84)
Quarterbacks: 10 Reggie Collier; 9 Mike Hohensee; Running backs: 23 Curtis Bledsoe RB; 40 Eric Robinson KR; 22 Johnnie Wright RB; 38 Billy Taylor FB; 35 Rickey Claitt FB; Wide receivers: 17 Joey Walters; 7 Ricky Simmons; 82 Mike Harris; 88 Randy Burke; 80 Mike Fisher; Tight ends: 84 McDonald Oden	Offensive linemen: 69 Joel Patten LT; 77 Jeff Sevy RT; 65 Chuck Slaughter LG; 61 James Farr RG; 60 Dave Pacella G; 64 Ed Fulton G; 53 Brian Musselman C/LS; 57 Tony Loia C; Defensive linemen: 92 Bennie Smith LDT; 78 Gurnest Brown RDT; 63 Ed Jackson DT; 99 Richard Tharpe LDE; 93 Kevin Kellin RDE; 79 Angelo Wells DE/DT	Linebackers: 55 Darnell Dailey LLB; 51 Mike Muller MLB; 52 Joe Hines RLB; 58 Mike Corvino LB; 59 Harold Randolph LB; 54 Bernard West LB; 56 Danny Triplett LB; Defensive backs: 36 Jeff Brown LCB; 47 Mike Thurman RCB; 24 Willie Holley CB; 28 Cookie Jackson CB; 20 Victor Jackson FS; 29 Kevin Donnalley FS; 44 Mike Guess SS; Special teams: 5 Jeff Brockhaus K; 3 Dave Smigelsky P	Developmental squad: 16 Lou Pagley QB; 10 Joe Gilliam QB; 76 David Sullivan T; 72 Leroy Robinson G; 83 Greg Taylor WR; 86 Charles Chisley WR; 50 Ben Apuna LB	Injured reserve: 37 Dennis Coit SS; 8 Dana Moore P	Other Players active in 1984: 20 Harold Woods CB; 11 Greg Porter K; rookies in italics 43 Active, 7 Inactive

== Moving the franchise ==
In March 1984, with the Federals failing on the field and at the gate for a second straight season, Bernhard decided to sell the franchise. Florida real estate developer Sherwood "Woody" Weiser agreed in principle to buy the Federals for $5.5 million and made plans to relocate the team to Miami as The Spirit of Miami for the 1985 season. In anticipation of the deal, the USFL executed a lease agreement for the Spirit to play at the Miami Orange Bowl. At a meeting on May 9, 1984, the USFL's team owners unanimously approved the sale of the Federals to Weiser.

Weiser signed up University of Miami head coach Howard Schnellenberger as part-owner, president, general manager, and head coach for the 1985 season. Schnellenberger was to assume his new posts as soon as the 1984 USFL season ended. Weiser envisioned closing the deal to purchase the Federals soon after the end of the 1984 USFL season, with Schnellenberger in the interim hiring assistant coaches and joining them in evaluating player talent on the Federals and elsewhere in the USFL and preparing a plan of action for the team after Weiser concluded the purchase. USFL owners openly discussed their expectation that a USFL championship game would take place at the Orange Bowl in the near future.

In June 1984, Bernhard's Washington Football Partners entered into a preliminary agreement to sell the Federals to American Sports, Ltd., a company controlled by Weiser. However, by this time there were persistent rumors that the USFL was considering moving to a fall schedule in 1986. Knowing that he could not even begin to compete with the NFL's Miami Dolphins for Miami's professional football market in the fall, Weiser insisted on writing an escape clause into the purchase agreement that allowed him to cancel the sale if the USFL switched to a fall schedule. On August 22, 1984, the USFL team owners voted to move to a fall schedule in 1986. Weiser promptly canceled the deal to purchase the Federals, and American Sports, Ltd., relinquished the franchise to Washington Football Partners two days later.

This left Bernhard in a desperate situation. Even without the impossible task of competing with the Redskins once the USFL moved to the fall, he had no intention of sticking it out for 1985 even if the USFL had stuck with playing in the spring. Years later, he said Washington fans had very little tolerance for losers, and had spoiled by the Redskins' resurgence in the 1970s and early 1980s.

Shortly thereafter, hospital magnate Donald Dizney, who had been a minority owner of the Tampa Bay Bandits before briefly joining Weiser's group, stepped in to end Bernhard's suffering. Dizney quickly reached a deal on the same terms that Bernhard had reached with Weiser. In a deal agreed to on August 28, 1984, and announced on September 1, 1984, Dizney bought the Federals, moved them to Orlando, Florida, and renamed them the Orlando Renegades.

== In Orlando ==
Orlando Football Partners, Inc., was incorporated in Florida on September 10, 1984, as the general partnership which owned the Orlando Renegades. On December 31, 1984, Orlando Football Partners, Ltd., was organized as a limited partnership to hold the franchise, with Orlando Football Partners, Inc., as the general partner.

The Renegades played at the Florida Citrus Bowl. Orlando originally lay within the territory of the Bandits, who had drawn many fans from the Orlando area. Rather than resist the franchise's move to Orlando, however, Bandits owner John F. Bassett embraced the natural rivalry. Bassett had claimed nearly all of Florida south of the Jacksonville area as his home territory, but readily surrendered those rights when the Federals initially made plans to move to Miami, and did the same when they ultimately moved to Orlando.

Unlike Schnellenberger and Weiser of the stillborn Miami franchise, Dizney did not have the benefit of several months of research of coaching and player possibilities. With Schnellenberger opting not to follow the team to Orlando, Dizney turned to Lee Corso, a Florida State University alumnus and a longtime college head coach best known for his tenure at Indiana. Corso had a clear plan that involved building the team around third-year quarterback Reggie Collier. After starting out looking much like the 1984 Federals, opening the season with six straight losses, the Renegades were fairly competitive in their remaining 12 games, winning five of them as the mobile and talented Collier, who had been an abysmal failure in Birmingham and Washington in his first two seasons, began to develop. (Collier later went on to play briefly for the Dallas Cowboys in the NFL). Backup quarterbacks Jerry Golstyen and Steve Pisarkiewicz also played. The team's offense also featured running back Curtis Bledsoe and wide receiver Joey Walters. The Renegades finished with a record of 5–13 and a seventh-place finish.

The Renegades drew far better than the Federals, averaging about 25,000 fans per game over their nine regular-season home dates, and the crowd of 26,847 that attended the June 1 game against Tampa Bay, which included many Bandits fans who traveled to Orlando from the Tampa area for the game as part of a growing Tampa Bay-Orlando rivalry, was a highlight of the season. Dizney had hoped to draw more Orlando-area fans away from the Bandits than the Renegades did in 1985 and for bigger crowds overall at Renegades home games. He nonetheless decided to move forward with the team in Orlando for the 1986 USFL season. One of his limited partners, Charles Givens, told NPR that he knew that the Renegades would not be included in any potential merger with the NFL, and contented himself with the likelihood that the Renegades and any other teams left out of a merger would automatically receive $14 million.

After the conclusion of the 1985 season, the USFL considered contraction of the league to focus on its more successful franchises. At a meeting on July 2, 1985, league owners discussed a possible merger of the league's three Florida teams. Dizney rejected the idea of the Renegades being involved in any merger, fearing he would lose credibility in Orlando if he agreed to move the Renegades out of the Orlando area. Ultimately, the Renegades were one of eight teams selected to continue operations in the 1986 season, when the USFL planned to switch to a fall schedule. However, the entire league collapsed before any games were played in 1986 after the USFL was only awarded three dollars in an antitrust suit against the NFL. The aborted move to Miami was cited as a factor in the adverse jury award.

Orlando Football Partners, Ltd., was dissolved on January 25, 1988, and the franchise's existence as a corporate entity came to an official end when Orlando Football Partners, Inc., was dissolved on September 26, 1997.

=== 1985 Orlando Renegades schedule and results ===
Week	Date	Opponent	Result	Record	Venue	Attendance
Preseason
1	February 2	vs. Baltimore Stars	W 16–10	1–0	Spec Martin Stadium, Deland, Florida	3,000
2	February 9	at Jacksonville Bulls	W 20–10	2–0	Gator Bowl Stadium	
3	February 15	New Jersey Generals	L 14–24	2–1	Florida Citrus Bowl	33,000
Regular season
1	February 23	at Tampa Bay Bandits	L 7–35	0–1	Tampa Stadium	45,045
2	March 1	New Jersey Generals	L 10–28	0–2	Florida Citrus Bowl	32,748
3	March 9	Birmingham Stallions	L 10–34	0–3	Florida Citrus Bowl	25,831
4	March 16	at Portland Breakers	L 17–23	0–4	Civic Stadium	25,885
5	March 21	at Jacksonville Bulls	L 31–34 (OT)	0–5	Gator Bowl Stadium	31,883
6	March 31	at Denver Gold	L 17–21	0–6	Mile High Stadium	10,217
7	April 4	Memphis Showboats	W 28–17	1–6	Florida Citrus Bowl	21,223
8	April 14	at Arizona Outlaws	W 24–19	2–6	Sun Devil Stadium	32,169
9	April 20	Jacksonville Bulls	L 10–31	2–7	Florida Citrus Bowl	34,338
10	April 29	at New Jersey Generals	L 7–24	2–8	Giants Stadium	38,084
11	May 5	Oakland Invaders	L 7–21	2–9	Florida Citrus Bowl	21,085
12	May 13	San Antonio Gunslingers	W 21–20	3–9	Florida Citrus Bowl	22,404
13	May 17	Baltimore Stars	L 21–34	3–10	Florida Citrus Bowl	23,121
14	May 27	at Birmingham Stallions	L 17–41	3–11	Legion Field	24,500
15	June 1	Tampa Bay Bandits	W 37–7	4–11	Florida Citrus Bowl	26,847
16	June 7	at Memphis Showboats	L 17–41	4–12	Liberty Bowl Memorial Stadium	23,216
17	June 15	at Baltimore Stars	L 10–41	4–13	Byrd Stadium	6,988
18	June 22	Los Angeles Express	W 17–10	5–13	Florida Citrus Bowl	22,865

=== 1985 Orlando Renegades opening day roster ===
Orlando Renegades 1985 Opening Day Roster (at 26-Feb-85)
Quarterbacks: 12 Jerry Golsteyn; 11 Steve Pisarkiewicz; Running backs: 23 Curtis Bledsoe RB; 33 William Miller KR; 36 Henry Odom FB; 24 Randy Johnson FB; Wide receivers: 17 Joey Walters; 7 Ricky Simmons; 85 Jerry Parrish KR; 81 Tom Mut; Tight ends: 89 Bob Niziolek; 88 Don Echols; 80 Tom Wheeler	Offensive linemen: 70 Jerry Doerger LT; 69 Joel Patten RT; 76 David Sullivan T; 73 Don Corbin LG; 64 Ed Fulton RG; 57 Mark Fischer C; 52 Brian Musselman C/G; Defensive linemen: 77 James Scott LDT; 74 Joe Ehrmann RDT; 67 Ken Times DT; 79 Ed McAleney DT; 94 Kevin Kellin LDE; 66 Scott Hutchinson RDE; 75 Mike Summerfield DE	Linebackers: 55 Kelvin Atkins LLB; 51 Jeff Gabrielson RLB; 59 Harold Randolph LB; 71 Mike Corvino LB; 50 Ed Jackson LB; 58 Bernard West LB; Defensive backs: 21 Lupe Sanchez LCB; 22 Elbert Gray RCB; 25 Fred Nichols CB; 44 Mike Guess FS; 30 Neal Colzie NB; 20 Victor Jackson FS; 34 James Stewart SS; Special teams: 5 Jeff Brockhaus K; 62 Bruce Byrom LS; 14 Greg Cater P	Inactives: 10 Reggie Collier QB; 84 Jackie Flowers WR; 87 Jeff Smith WR; 60 James Farr G; 78 Val Brown DE; 53 Fred McCallister LB; 56 Ron Freeman LB; rookies in italics 43 Active, 7 Inactive

=== 1985 Orlando Renegades final roster ===
Orlando Renegades 1985 Final Roster (at 22-Jun-85)
Quarterbacks: 10 Reggie Collier; 12 Jerry Golsteyn; Running backs: 23 Curtis Bledsoe RB; 26 Richard Crump RB; 31 Lonnie Johnson KR; 40 Cornelius Quarles FB; Wide receivers: 17 Joey Walters; 7 Ricky Simmons; 85 Jerry Parrish KR; 84 Jackie Flowers; 87 Jeff Smith; 82 Wilford Morgan; Tight ends: 89 Bob Niziolek; 88 Don Echols	Offensive linemen: 72 Ed Muransky LT; 69 Joel Patten RT; 70 Jerry Doerger T/C; 63 Thom Dornbrook LG; 64 Ed Fulton RG; 76 Ron Mikolajczyk G/T; 52 Brian Musselman C/LS; 57 Mark Fischer C; Defensive linemen: 68 David Graham LDT; 77 James Scott RDT; 79 Ed McAleney DT; 94 Kevin Kellin LDE; 66 Scott Hutchinson RDE; 99 Charles Riggins DE; 65 Ike Griffin DE	Linebackers: 55 Kelvin Atkins LLB; 56 Ron Freeman MLB; 50 Ed Jackson RLB; 58 Bernard West LB; 59 Harold Randolph LB; 53 Fred McCallister LB; Defensive backs: 43 Jeff George LCB; 22 Elbert Gray RCB; 20 Victor Jackson FS; 48 Kevin McGowan FS; 21 Lupe Sanchez SS/CB; 34 James Stewart SS; Special teams: 5 Jeff Brockhaus K; 62 Bruce Byrom LS; 14 Greg Cater P	Inactives: 11 Steve Pisarkiewicz QB; 35 Ricky Claitt FB; 60 James Farr G; 71 Dan Doubiago G; 74 Joe Ehrmann DT; 51 Jeff Gabrielson LB; 44 Mike Guess CB; rookies in italics 43 Active, 7 Inactive

== Single season leaders ==
Rushing Yards: 1080 (1984), Curtis Bledsoe

Receiving Yards: 1510 (1984), Joey Walters

Passing Yards: 2766 (1984), Mike Hohensee

== Season-by-season results ==
Season records
Season	W	L	T	Finish	Playoff results
Washington Federals
1983	4	14	0	4th Atlantic Division	–
1984	3	15	0	T-3rd Atlantic Division	–
Orlando Renegades
1985	5	13	0	7th Eastern Conference	–
Totals	12	42	0		
