= Dave Smigelsky =

American football player (born 1959)

No. 3
- Position: Punter

Personal information
- Born: July 3, 1959 (age 67); Perth Amboy, New Jersey, U.S.
- Listed height: 5 ft 11 in (1.80 m)
- Listed weight: 180 lb (82 kg)

Career information
- High school: North Hunterdon
- College: Virginia Tech
- NFL draft: 1981: undrafted

Career history
- Washington Redskins (1981)*; Baltimore Colts (1982)*; Atlanta Falcons (1982); Washington Redskins (1983)*; Washington Federals (1984)
- * Offseason or practice squad member only

Career NFL statistics
- Punts: 26
- Punt yards: 1,000
- Longest punt: 54
- Stats at Pro Football Reference

David William Smigelsky (born July 3, 1959) is an American former professional football player who was a punter for the Atlanta Falcons of the National Football League (NFL) and Washington Federals of the United States Football League (USFL). He played college football for the Virginia Tech Hokies.
