= Victor Jackson =

Australian rules footballer

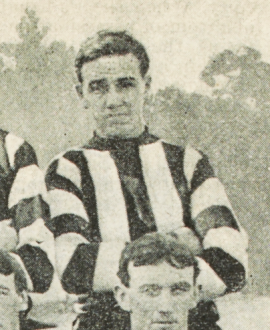
- Jackson in 1912

Personal information
- Full name: George Victor Claude Jackson
- Born: 9 April 1889; Fentons Creek, Victoria
- Died: 28 December 1959 (aged 70); Pascoe Vale, Victoria
- Original team: Castlemaine
- Height: 185 cm (6 ft 1 in)
- Weight: 84 kg (185 lb)

Playing career^{1}
Years	Club	Games (Goals)
1912	Collingwood	3 (0)
- ^{1} Playing statistics correct to the end of 1912.

George Victor Claude Jackson (9 April 1889 – 28 December 1959) was an Australian rules footballer who played with Collingwood in the Victorian Football League (VFL).
