= Dave Pacella =

American football player (born 1960)

No. 72
- Positions: Center, guard

Personal information
- Born: February 7, 1960 (age 66); Sewickley, Pennsylvania, U.S.
- Listed height: 6 ft 2 in (1.88 m)
- Listed weight: 266 lb (121 kg)

Career information
- High school: Reading (PA)
- College: Maryland

Career history
- Washington Federals (1983–1984); Philadelphia Eagles (1984)

Awards and highlights
- First-team All-ACC (1982)
- Stats at Pro Football Reference

Dave Pacella (born February 7, 1960) is an American former football center and guard. He played for the Washington Federals from 1983 to 1984 and for the Philadelphia Eagles in 1984.
