= John Gillen (American football) =

American football player (born 1958)

No. 53, 54, 55, 57
- Position: Linebacker

Personal information
- Born: November 5, 1958 (age 68); Arlington Heights, Illinois, U.S.
- Listed height: 6 ft 3 in (1.91 m)
- Listed weight: 227 lb (103 kg)

Career information
- High school: St. Viator (Arlington Heights)
- College: Illinois
- NFL draft: 1981: 5th round, 116th overall pick

Career history
- St. Louis Cardinals (1981–1982); New England Patriots (1983); Chicago Blitz (1984); Arizona Outlaws (1985)
- Stats at Pro Football Reference

John Francis Gillen Sr. (born November 5, 1958) is an American former professional football player who was a linebacker for the St. Louis Cardinals and New England Patriots of the National Football League (NFL), as well as the Chicago Blitz and the Arizona Outlaws of the United States Football League (USFL). He played college football for the Illinois Fighting Illini.

== Early life ==
Gillen was born in Arlington Heights, Illinois, and attended St. Viator High School, where he lettered in football, basketball, and track. He was the MVP of his high school football team and was honored as an all-state linebacker. He graduated from the school in 1977.

== College years ==
From 1977 to 1981, Gillen was a starter at middle linebacker for the Illinois Fighting Illini. He led the team in tackles for three years and was the defensive captain for two. In 1980, he received All-Big Ten honors and was voted the most valuable defensive player at Illinois. He played in the 1981 Senior Bowl.

== Professional football career ==
=== St. Louis Cardinals ===
Gillen was selected by the St. Louis Cardinals in the fifth round of the 1981 NFL draft, with the 116th pick overall. During the 1981 season, Gillen played in all 16 games.

He was injured before the 1982 season and was placed on injured reserve in September 1982. By December, he was able to play again, and appeared in the team's last four regular season games as well as their first and only playoff game, a 41–16 loss to the Green Bay Packers.

=== New England Patriots ===
Gillen played eight games with the New England Patriots in 1983. His last appearance in an NFL game was a November 20, 1983 home game against the Cleveland Browns, in which the Patriots were shut out 30–0.

=== Chicago Blitz ===
In 1984, Gillen headed to the United States Football League, where he played the rest of his professional career. He joined the Chicago Blitz that year, where he played middle linebacker and was used once on a kickoff return for 11 yards.

=== Arizona Outlaws ===
In 1985, Gillen played with the USFL's Arizona Outlaws, alongside his younger brother Ken.

== Personal life ==
Gillen lives in Glen Ellyn, Illinois, with his wife, Wendy, and three children, John, Conor, and Grace. Both of his sons played college football: John for the Wisconsin Badgers and Conor for the Fighting Illini.
