= Ed Fulton (American football) =

American football player (born 1955)

Profile
- Position: Offensive guard

Personal information
- Born: January 27, 1955 (age 71); Abington, Pennsylvania, U.S.

Career information
- College: Maryland
- NFL draft: 1977: 3rd round, 68th overall pick

Career history
- 1978: Los Angeles Rams
- 1979: Buffalo Bills
- 1980–1982: Hamilton Tiger-Cats (CFL)

Awards and highlights
- First-team All-ACC (1976)
- Stats at Pro Football Reference

Edward Ulmer Fulton (born January 27, 1955) is an American former professional football player who was an offensive guard in the National Football League (NFL) for the Los Angeles Rams and the Buffalo Bills. He finished his professional career in the Canadian Football League, playing three seasons for the Hamilton Tiger-Cats, where he was a two-time Eastern All Star. He played college football for the Maryland Terrapins. He continued his love of football by coaching high school football in Carroll County, Maryland. He worked with Westminster High School, North Carroll High School and Liberty High School.
