= Chicago Blitz =

American football team

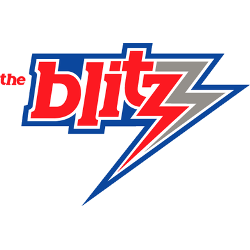
Logo

General information
- Founded: 1982
- Folded: 1984
- Headquartered: Soldier Field in Chicago, Illinois
- Colors: Red, Blue, Silver, White

Personnel
- Owners: 1983 Dr. Ted Diethrich; 1984 Dr. James Hoffman; 1984 The USFL
- General manager: Bruce Allen (1983)
- Head coach: 1983 George Allen (12-7); 1984 Marv Levy (5-13)

Team history
- Chicago Blitz (1983–1984)

Home fields
- Soldier Field (1983–1984)

League / conference affiliations
- United States Football League (1983–1985): Western Conference (1984); Central Division (1983–1984)

The Chicago Blitz was a professional American football team that played in the United States Football League (USFL) in the mid-1980s. They played at Soldier Field in Chicago, Illinois.

== Team history ==
The Blitz were one of the twelve charter franchises of the USFL. The owner was originally slated to be J. Walter Duncan, an Oklahoma oil magnate who had grown up in Chicago. However, league founder David Dixon persuaded Duncan to take on ownership of the New York City franchise–which became the New Jersey Generals–after its original owner, Donald Trump, pulled out.

With Duncan's withdrawal, legendary NFL coach George Allen and Southern California developer Willard Vernon Harris, Jr. applied for the vacant Chicago franchise. A search for capital led them to renowned heart surgeon Dr. Ted Diethrich, who had originally expressed interest in a franchise for his hometown of Phoenix. Allen and Diethrich had been friends since the 1970s, when Diethrich gave a talk on heart disease to Allen's Washington Redskins. However, he agreed to join Allen and Harris' group in return for controlling interest. Diethrich served as president, with Harris as executive vice president and Allen as chairman of the board and head coach.

=== George Allen ===
Allen had been out of coaching since 1977; he had been a candidate for the vacant head coaching position with the Chicago Bears a year earlier; he'd made his mark in the NFL a quarter-century earlier as the Bears' de facto defensive coordinator. However, Bears owner George Halas had never forgiven Allen for defecting to the Los Angeles Rams in 1965. The feeling was mutual; Allen relished the chance to get the better of the rival Bears. Allen immediately became the "face" of the new team, and set about putting together the best 40-man roster he could find. The result was a team loaded with NFL veterans that was the early favorite to be the new league's first champion.

=== 1983 season ===
The Blitz finished in a tie for the Central Division title with the Michigan Panthers. However, the Panthers were awarded the division title after sweeping the Blitz in the regular season, and would go on to become the league's first champions.

In the playoffs, the Blitz blew a 21-point lead over the Philadelphia Stars, losing 44–38 in overtime.

==== Struggling at the gate ====
The Blitz was one of the strongest teams in the league. Indeed, some suggested that the Blitz and the two finalists, the Stars and Panthers, could have been competitive in the NFL. However, they struggled at the gate, averaging only 18,100 fans—a total that looked even smaller in the relatively spacious configuration of Soldier Field. These numbers were very similar to the gates for the Stars and Panthers in their first year. Both of those franchises would see dramatically higher attendance numbers in their second season based on their on-field success in their first year.

Diethrich lost millions of dollars in 1983. Although he, like most of the other owners, knew that he could expect years of losses until the USFL established itself, he soon tired of flying between his home in Phoenix (he was the founder of the Arizona Heart Institute) and Chicago. Indeed, he had actually sought a team in Phoenix when the USFL initially took shape, but backed out when he could not hammer out a stadium deal. Years later, he said that spending three days a week in Chicago or wherever the Blitz were playing made it difficult to continue his heart research, and led him to conclude he could not be an absentee owner in the long run.

==== Franchise swap with Arizona Wranglers ====
As it turned out, Arizona Wranglers owner Jim Joseph had lost almost as much money as Diethrich, and was looking to sell the Wranglers. Diethrich was willing to take over in Arizona if he could bring Allen and his NFL veteran-loaded roster with him. Joseph readily agreed. Soon afterward, Diethrich found a buyer for the Blitz in Milwaukee-based heart surgeon James Hoffman.

This resulted in one of the most unusual transactions in sports history. On September 20, 1983, Diethrich sold the Blitz to Hoffman for $7.2 million, then bought the Wranglers from Joseph. Hoffman and Diethrich then engineered a swap of assets in which Allen, the Blitz coaching staff and most of the Blitz players moved to Phoenix while most of the Wranglers roster moved to Chicago. Over 100 total players changed hands. The most notable exception was that Wrangler quarterback Alan Risher stayed in Arizona to back up Greg Landry.

Diethrich initially wanted to take the Blitz name with him to Arizona, but Hoffman insisted on keeping the Blitz name in Chicago. However, little else was left. As soon as the deal closed, Allen sent virtually everything of value at Blitz headquarters in Des Plaines to Phoenix, including typewriters and mirrors. Nearly everything with a Blitz logo or even the team name was thrown into the dumpster. Allen also sent some $100,000 worth of equipment that should have stayed in Chicago as part of the purchase, but Diethrich promised it would be returned.

The deal transformed the Wranglers from a cellar-dweller to a powerhouse almost overnight, while turning the Blitz from the third-best team in the league into a lesser version of a team that finished 4–14, tied for the worst record in the league. However, Hoffman claimed that he would not have even considered buying the team had he been required to keep the expensive player contracts. Nonetheless, the transaction raised serious questions about the USFL's credibility—especially in Chicago.

The USFL considered the 1983 and 1984 Wranglers to be the same franchise, even though almost all the players were different.

=== The Hoffman era ===
Hoffman spent heavily in promoting the new Blitz. He hired NFL veteran, future Pro Football Hall of Famer and Chicago native Marv Levy as coach: Levy reportedly thought he would be taking over George Allen's team when he took the job.

Bears backup QB Vince Evans was brought in to be the new Blitz starting quarterback. Evans signed in November 1983 to a 4-year, $5 million deal in spite of owning a rather unimpressive 57.31 QB rating in seven previous NFL seasons. Evans' accuracy was always an issue in the NFL. His most accurate season up to that point was 1980 when he completed 53.2% of his passes. He entered the USFL with a career NFL competition percentage of 48.7% and a 31–53 TD to INT ratio.

In January 1984, the Blitz tendered an offer that would have been the largest contract in football, $2 million a year for 3 years, to Bears star running back Walter Payton. Payton promised to consider the offer, but would not be rushed. The Blitz 1984 season was scheduled to start on February 27 and the new ownership had little success selling season tickets. As the Blitz needed Payton quickly to help sales, so they put a deadline on the offer of February 9. In the event, before Payton made his decision, the Blitz withdrew the offer realizing they simply did not have the finances.

After this failure, Hoffman aggressively marketed the Blitz, pouring much money into advertising. It was to no avail; with a less talented team and no big names to attract fans, ticket sales flatlined. Fans were unhappy that Hoffman had jettisoned the core of a near NFL-quality team in favor of an also-ran.

At the outset, the USFL had made much of the fact that it required potential owners to submit to a detailed due diligence and meet strict capitalization requirements. However, it subsequently emerged that USFL officials had largely dispensed with these procedures after Hoffman made an offer for the Blitz. They had been so desperate to get an apparently solid owner in the nation's third-largest market that they never took a close look at Hoffman's finances. He only paid $500,000 at signing, with the remainder of the purchase price due in installments.

When Hoffman realized that he had grossly underestimated the cost of running a professional football team, he scrambled to find minority investors, but not before falling behind in paying several bills. After the second preseason game, Hoffman abruptly walked away and nominally left the team in the hands of his minority partners. However, Hoffman's now-former partners returned the franchise to the league soon afterward when they could not even begin to secure the financing needed to take the field.

The USFL now had a major problem, as they could not simply shut down the Blitz. Its contract with ABC required the league to have teams in the New York, Los Angeles and Chicago markets, which were home to ABC's strongest-performing stations.

The league was forced to take over the franchise, with league personnel director Carl Marasco taking over as team president, and future Hall of Famer Bill Polian becoming player personnel director. Soon after taking control, Marasco fired nearly all of Hoffman's front office staff in a cost-cutting move.

=== The 1984 season ===
Although the 1984 Blitz had many of the same players as the 1983 Wranglers, they were a weaker team due to two reasons.

First, there was an expansion draft and its requirements. All of the initial 12 teams were required to make players available for the six new expansion teams. Secondly, Evans was not a capable replacement for Risher, the league's 6th-ranked passer in 1983.

Levy kept the "new" Blitz competitive at first. While they lost their first five games, two came as a result of late field goals and one came in overtime. They managed consecutive wins over Washington and San Antonio, but won only three more times after that, finishing with the third-worst record in the league. The 1983 Wrangler defense gave up a league worst 442 points and the 1984 Blitz were equally as challenged defensively, finishing second to last in the league with 466 points allowed.

Evans was the quarterback many fans expected—a flashy talent with little accuracy or consistency and a penchant for turnovers. For the season, he completed 48.7% of his passes with 14 TDs and 22 INTs for a rating of 58.29. Featured HB Larry Canada was solid, running for 915 yards and 7 TDs and adding 48 catches. WR Marcus Anderson led the team with 50 catches for 940 yards with 5 TDs. All-Pro punter Jeff Gossett led the USFL with a 42.5-yard avg.

Matters were little better off the field. The league only pumped the bare minimum into the team to keep it on the field through the season. With their promotional efforts derailed by the firing of the front office staff the Blitz attracted only 7,500 people per game, the second-lowest average gate in the league. The inability to draw even 10,000 per game would dramatically affect the team's bottom line.

=== Shutting down ===
With four games to go, a press conference was held announcing that the Blitz would be shut down. At the same time, the USFL awarded a new Chicago franchise to Chicago White Sox minority owner Eddie Einhorn. While it was stressed that Einhorn's franchise was not the Blitz, Einhorn retained the rights to all Blitz players and coaching staff—strongly implying the team would play in the 1985 season. ABC had no objections to this move, probably due to the USFL's anemic ratings in Chicago.

Einhorn was a strong proponent of the USFL's planned move to the fall in 1986 (so as not to compete with his own White Sox or their crosstown rivals the Chicago Cubs for fans), and focused his efforts on getting a new television deal for the team. He was only willing to field a team in the USFL's final spring lame duck season of 1985 if he could merge with another team and was allowed to select players in an expansion draft. When the league refused to agree to these terms, he opted to sit out the 1985 season. He decided to sit out 1986 as well and concentrate instead on getting a new television deal. It wound up being academic when the USFL suspended operations after only winning three dollars in damages in an antitrust suit against the NFL.

=== Players who went on to the National Football League ===
The Blitz had a number of players who had played in the National Football League or would go on to play there. Some of them were Vince Evans, Tim Spencer, Trumaine Johnson, Greg Landry, Jeff Gossett, Vagas Ferguson, Richard Holland, Joe Ehrmann, Tim Wrightman, Larry Canada, Tom Thayer, Frank Minnifield, Jim Fahnhorst, Marc May, Brian Glasgow, Walter Easley, Luther Bradley, Troy Thomas, Robert Cobb, Ed Smith, Stan White, Eddie Brown, Kevin Long, and Mark Keel.

There are currently two coaches in the Pro Football Hall of Fame that coached in the USFL, both whom coached the Blitz: George Allen (1983) and Marv Levy (1984).

== 1984 Blitz game results ==
Week	Date	Opponent	Result	Record	Venue	Attendance
Preseason
1	Bye					
2	February 4	vs. Michigan Panthers	L 20–21	0–1	Scottsdale, Arizona	
3	February 11	vs. Oakland Invaders	W 31–21	1–1	Mesa, Arizona	
4	February 18	vs. Denver Gold	L 24–25	1–2	Casa Grande, Arizona	
Regular season
1	February 27	at Michigan Panthers	L 18–20	0–1	Pontiac Silverdome	22,428
2	March 4	at Memphis Showboats	L 13–23	0–2	Liberty Bowl	10,152
3	March 11	Houston Gamblers	L 36–45	0–3	Soldier Field	7,808
4	March 17	Oklahoma Outlaws	L 14–17	0–4	Soldier Field	6,206
5	March 25	at New Orleans Breakers	L 35–41 (OT)	0–5	Louisiana Superdome	43,692
6	March 31	at Washington Federals	W 21–20	1–5	RFK Stadium	7,373
7	April 7	San Antonio Gunslingers	W 16–10	2–5	Soldier Field	9,412
8	April 15	at Philadelphia Stars	L 7–41	2–6	Veterans Stadium	17,417
9	April 20	Los Angeles Express	W 49–29	3–6	Soldier Field	11,713
10	April 29	Oakland Invaders	L 13–17	3–7	Soldier Field	7,802
11	May 6	at San Antonio Gunslingers	L 21–30	3–8	Alamo Stadium	15,233
12	May 11	at Denver Gold	W 29–17	4–8	Mile High Stadium	45,299
13	May 18	Birmingham Stallions	L 7–41	4–9	Soldier Field	8,578
14	May 28	New Jersey Generals	L 17–21	4–10	Soldier Field	4,307
15	June 2	at Oklahoma Outlaws	W 14–0	5–10	Skelly Stadium	17,195
16	June 10	at Houston Gamblers	L 13–38	5–11	Houston Astrodome	24,243
17	June 15	Arizona Wranglers	L 0–36	5–12	Soldier Field	5,711
18	June 24	Michigan Panthers	L 17–20	5–13	Soldier Field	5,557

== 1984 Chicago Blitz roster ==
1984 Chicago Blitz roster
Quarterbacks: 8 Vince Evans; 11 Dennis Shaw; 14 Tim Koegel; 15 Ron Reeves; Running backs: 26 Vagas Ferguson RB; 29 Gary Worthy RB; 33 Glenn Ford RB; 35 Larry Canada RB; 42 Jim Stone FB; 44 Terdell Middleton RB; Wide receivers: 80 Marcus Anderson; 82 Darryl Stokes; 82 Vic James; 84 Keith Magee; 84 Dan Fulton; 85 T.K. Ehlerbracht; 86 Gary Lewis; 87 Oliver Williams; 87 Frank McClain; 88 Jackie Flowers; 88 Shawn Potts; 89 Kris Haines; Tight ends: 81 Brian Glasgow; 83 Mark Keel	Offensive linemen: 57 Mark Fischer C; 60 Mike Weston C; 62 Perry Hartnett G; 63 Vince Stroth T; 65 Glenn Hyde G; 71 Rod Walters G; 73 Bob Simmons G; 74 Doug Hoppock T; 77 Dan Jiggetts T; 78 Jerry Doerger T; Defensive linemen: 61 Ray Cattage DE; 68 Curtis Bunche DE; 70 Malcolm Taylor DT; 72 Ken Times DE; 76 Mike Morgan DT; 79 Bruce Thornton DE; 91 Bob Clasby DE; 91 Chris Lindstrom DE; 93 Dennis Puha DT	Linebackers: 51 Robin Fisher LB; 51 Russ Washington LB; 52 Jimmy Rivera LB; 52 Jeff Gabrielson OLB; 53 John Gillen MLB; 54 Tom Kilkenny LB; 55 Sam Norris LB; 55 Dann Lute LB; 56 Clinton Haynes LB; 56 Greg Williams LB; 56 Guy Ruff LB; 58 Jon Kimmel LB; 58 Bob Knapton LB; 59 Jim Looney LB; 59 Ken Kelley OLB; 51 Andy Cannavino LB	Defensive backs: 19 Carlton Peoples CB; 20 Ronnie Harris CB; 21 Trent Bryant CB; 22 Donnell Daniel SS; 24 Virgil Livers CB; 25 Tommy Wilcox SS; 27 Mike Fox FS; 28 John Arnaud FS; 44 Roy Eppes FS; 46 Doug Plank SS; 47 Charles Armstead CB; 44 Kirk Wilson CB; 37 Kerry Baird FS; Special teams: 3 Kevin Seibel K; 7 Jeff Gossett P; 13 David Whitt P

== Single season leaders ==
Rushing Yards: 1157 (1983), Tim Spencer

Receiving Yards: 1327 (1983), Trumaine Johnson

Passing Yards: 2624 (1984), Vince Evans

== Season-by-season ==
Season records
Season	W	L	T	Finish	Playoff results
1983	12	6	0	2nd Central	Lost Divisional (Philadelphia)
1984	5	13	0	5th WC Central	-
Totals	17	20	0	(including playoffs)	
