= Jackie Flowers =

American football player (born 1958)

No. 23
- Position: Wide receiver

Personal information
- Born: March 4, 1958 (age 68); Jacksonville, Florida, U.S.
- Listed height: 6 ft 2 in (1.88 m)
- Listed weight: 195 lb (88 kg)

Career information
- High school: William M. Raines (Jacksonville)
- College: Florida State
- NFL draft: 1980: 9th round, 246th overall pick

Career history
- Dallas Cowboys (1980)*; Tampa Bay Buccaneers (1980–1981); Arizona Wranglers (1983); Chicago Blitz (1984); Pittsburgh Maulers (1984); Orlando Renegades (1985)
- * Offseason or practice squad member only

Awards and highlights
- Second-team All-American (1979)

Jackie Flowers (born March 4, 1958) is an American former professional football player who was a wide receiver in the United States Football League (USFL) for the Arizona Wranglers, Chicago Blitz, Pittsburgh Maulers and Orlando Renegades. He also played in the National Football League (NFL) for the Tampa Bay Buccaneers. He played college football for the Florida State Seminoles.

== Early life ==
Flowers was a standout wide receiver at William M. Raines High School, graduating in 1976. He accepted a football scholarship from Florida State University where he was a four-year letterman.

In 1978, he made 43 catches for 757 yards (led the team) and 7 touchdowns, earning honorable-mention All-American honors.

In his senior year, he caught 37 passes for 622 yards (led the team), 7 touchdowns, a 2-point conversion reception and was named second-team All-American. Against Memphis State University, he had 9 receptions for 117 yards and one touchdown.

He finished his college career as the school's fifth-leading receiver with 102 receptions for 1,730 yards (17-yards per catch) and 15 touchdowns.

== Professional career ==
=== Dallas Cowboys ===
Flowers was selected by the Dallas Cowboys in the ninth round (246th overall) of the 1980 NFL draft, after dropping because he lacked speed and was seen as a possession receiver. On August 25, he was waived in pre-season after the Cowboys decided to keep only 3 wide receivers on the roster.

=== Tampa Bay Buccaneers ===
In December 1980, he was signed as a free agent by the Tampa Bay Buccaneers. In 1981, he was placed on the injured reserve list with a knee injury, before being released the next year.

=== Arizona Wranglers ===
In 1983, Flowers jumped to the Arizona Wranglers of the United States Football League after being out of football for a year, registering 63 receptions for 869 yards and 11 touchdowns, including the longest reception (98 yards) in league history. At the end of the season, Wranglers owner Jim Joseph did an unprecedented swap of franchises with Chicago Blitz owner Ted Diethrich. Diethrich sold the Blitz to James Hoffman, then bought the Wranglers from Joseph. Hoffman and Diethrich then engineered a swap of assets in which Allen, the Blitz coaching staff and most of its players moved to Phoenix while most of the Wranglers roster moved to Chicago.

=== Chicago Blitz ===
In 1984, he played for the Chicago Blitz with head coach Marv Levy. On March 19, he was traded to the Pittsburgh Maulers in exchange for a draft choice.

=== Pittsburgh Maulers ===
In 1984, Flowers was one of the league's best wide receivers with the Pittsburgh Maulers, leading the team with 46 catches for 881 yards and 8 touchdowns. The next year owner Edward J. DeBartolo, Sr. folded the team, after the USFL announced that they would be switching to a fall schedule in 1986.

=== Orlando Renegades ===
In 1985, he signed with the Orlando Renegades for what would become the final season of USFL operations, registering 30 catches for 373 yards and 5 touchdowns.

== Career statistics ==
=== USFL ===
USFL Statistics
Season	Team	Games	Rec	Yds	Avg	TD	Att	Yds	Avg	TD	Att	Yds	Avg	TD
Team		Receiving					Rushing				Kickoff Returns			
1983	Arizona Wranglers	18	63	869	13.8	11	2	-2	-1.0	0	2	44	22.0	0
1984	Chicago Blitz	3	5	23	4.6	0	0	0	0	0	0	0	0	0
1984	Pittsburgh Maulers	14	46	881	19.2	8	5	41	8.2	0	0	0	0	0
1985	Orlando Renegades	12	30	373	12.4	5	2	17	8.5	0	0	0	0	0
	Career	47	144	2,146	14.9	24	9	56	6.2	0	2	44	22.0	0

=== College ===
Legend
	Led Independents
	Independent record
	Led the NCAA
	NCAA record
**Bold**	Career high

College receiving & rushing statistics*
Season	School	Games	Rec	Yds	Avg	TD	Att	Yds	Avg	TD
Team		Receiving					Rushing			
1976	Florida State	**11**	9	160	**17.8**	1	0	0	0.0	0
1977	Florida State	**11**	13	191	14.7	0	**1**	**3**	**3.0**	0
1978	Florida State	**11**	**43**	**757**	17.6	**7**	0	0	0.0	0
1979	Florida State	**11**	37	622	16.8	**7**	0	0	0.0	0
Career	Florida State	44	102	1,730	17.0	15	1	3	3.0	0

* Includes bowl games.
