= Jeff Boyd =

Canadian football player

No. 70, 80
- Position: Wide receiver

Personal information
- Born: April 17, 1958 (age 68); Riverside, California, U.S.
- Listed height: 6 ft 2 in (1.88 m)
- Listed weight: 180 lb (82 kg)

Career information
- College: Cal State Fullerton

Career history
- 1982: Edmonton Eskimos*
- 1983–1987: Winnipeg Blue Bombers
- 1988–1991: Toronto Argonauts
- * Offseason or practice squad member only

Awards and highlights
- 2× Grey Cup champion (1984, 1991); CFL All-Star (1985)

Jeff Boyd (born April 17, 1958) is a former Canadian Football League (CFL) wide receiver for the Winnipeg Blue Bombers and the Toronto Argonauts who, in a 9-year career from 1983 to 1991, caught 69 touchdown passes. He won two Grey Cups, 1984 with Winnipeg and 1991 with Toronto.
