= Arizona Wranglers =

American football team (1982–1985)

General information
- Founded: 1982
- Folded: 1985
- Headquartered: Sun Devil Stadium in Tempe, Arizona
- Colors: Flag Blue, Red, Copper, Yellow, White

Personnel
- Owners: Jim Joseph (1983); Ted Diethrich (1984)
- General manager: Bruce Allen (1984)
- Head coach: Doug Shively (1983); George Allen (1984)

Team history
- Arizona Wranglers (1982–1984); Arizona Outlaws (1985)

Home fields
- Sun Devil Stadium (1982–1985)

League / conference affiliations
- United States Football League (1982–1985): Western Conference (1982–1985); Pacific Division (1982–1985)

Championships
- Conference championships: 1; 1984

Playoff appearances (1)
- 1984

The Arizona Wranglers were a professional American football team in the United States Football League (USFL) that existed from late 1982 to mid-1985. They played at Sun Devil Stadium on the campus of Arizona State University in Tempe, Arizona.

== History ==
=== Founding ===
The team that would eventually become the Arizona Wranglers was originally supposed to be the USFL's Los Angeles franchise. The team's planned original owner, Alex Spanos, pulled out of his USFL commitment and instead bought a minority stake in the NFL's San Diego Chargers.

The owners of the Oakland Invaders, Bay Area real estate executives Jim Joseph and Tad Taube, flipped a coin to decide who would take action to become the new owner of the USFL's Los Angeles franchise. Joseph won the flip and got the USFL rights to Los Angeles, selling his stake in the Invaders to Taube.

A few months later, fate shuffled the deck. The owners of the USFL's San Diego franchise, cable television pioneers Bill Daniels and Alan Harmon, could not secure access to Jack Murphy Stadium. (Due to pressure from the Chargers, the USFL would never be able to successfully negotiate a lease to Jack Murphy Stadium, a situation that would force a second USFL team, the Outlaws, to leave San Diego before playing a down.)

USFL officials felt that Daniels and Harmon's ties to the cable industry would be better suited for the country's second-largest market; David Dixon's blueprint depended on heavy television exposure. The league forced Joseph to surrender rights to Los Angeles to Daniels and Harmon, whose franchise became the Los Angeles Express. Joseph finally settled on a move to Phoenix, bringing professional football to the city for the first time.

=== 1983 season ===
Joseph appeared to hold fast to the USFL's original blueprint. He aggressively marketed the team in Arizona while keeping a tight rein on spending (including player salaries). The results were a mixed bag. The roster was a young team with some talent at the skill positions, but fewer quality starters in the starting lineup and less depth of talent than their opponents. Due to a weaker product, the ticket sales were only in line with most other teams in the league.

The Wranglers were quite competitive at first, posting a 4–4 record and moving into a four-way tie for first in their division. However, they lost their last 10 games—tied for the longest losing streak in league history—finishing in a tie for the worst record in the league (the Wranglers split with the Washington Federals, who also finished 4–14).

The 1983 Wranglers featured some talent on offense including the League's 6th ranked passer in rookie QB Alan Risher, 12th ranked rusher in 3rd year vet Leon Calvin Murray, and the league's #7, #10, #11 receivers (1983 rookies TE Mark Keel, WR Jackie Flowers, and WR Neil Balholm, respectively).

Their defense was not as strong, although it looked fairly strong on paper before the season. The Wranglers signed San Francisco 49er ILB Jeff McIntyre and ILB Glen Perkins from the University of Arizona. But during the pre-season McIntyre, who had a personal services contract with Joseph, asked to be traded because of contract issues. Perkins suffered a knee injury that slowed his play and development.

The Wranglers probably benefited early on from the league's decision not to have a preseason. When the rest of their opponents reached mid-season form, the undermanned Wrangler defense appeared to have trouble keeping the games within reach of the offense. The Wranglers gave up 442 points, easily the most in the league. The Wranglers only scored more than 23 points once all season—in their week 2 upset of George Allen's Chicago Blitz.

In hopes of avoiding Arizona's often-oppressive summer heat, the league scheduled six of the Wranglers' first eight games at home. They were on the road for seven of their last 10, including the last three weeks and five of the last six.

=== Transaction with the Chicago Blitz ===
Joseph lost millions of dollars in the 1983 season. Like most of the other owners, he had bought into the league knowing to expect years of losses. However, he was disappointed in the team's attendance and unwilling to stick it out in Arizona.

In a stroke of luck for Joseph, Chicago Blitz owner Dr. Ted Diethrich (a Phoenix resident and founder of the Arizona Heart Institute) wanted a chance to move closer to his business interests in the Phoenix area. Despite fielding a near-NFL quality team that had come up one game short of the USFL title game, the Blitz' attendance had been lackluster at best. Diethrich had lost millions of dollars, and did not believe those losses justified an investment that far from home.

Diethrich thought he had a solution to both his and Joseph's problems—an unprecedented swap of franchises. Diethrich sold the Blitz to fellow surgeon James Hoffman, who then bought the Wranglers from Joseph. Allen, who had been chairman and head coach of the Blitz, took the same posts in Arizona. His entire coaching staff moved to Phoenix as well. Hoffman and Diethrich engineered a swap of assets in which most of the Blitz players moved to Phoenix, while most of the Wranglers roster moved to Chicago. The most notable exception was that Wrangler quarterback Alan Risher stayed in Arizona to back up former Blitz quarterback Greg Landry. The deal allowed Allen to keep virtually all of the NFL veteran-laden roster that he had painstakingly assembled for the Blitz in 1983. It also allowed Diethrich to get a team in his hometown; he had originally sought a USFL franchise for Phoenix in 1983, only to buy controlling interest in the (original) Blitz after being unable to get a lease for Sun Devil Stadium.

Diethrich wanted to take the Blitz name with him to Arizona, but Hoffman rebuffed him. As a result, Diethrich rebranded his team as the "new" Arizona Wranglers. While the USFL was active, the league considered the 1983 and 1984 Wranglers to be the same franchise, even though almost all the players were different.

The deal transformed the Wranglers from a cellar-dweller to a league powerhouse almost overnight. However, the trade raised questions about the USFL's credibility. The questions were particularly loud in Chicago. While the old Blitz had been at worst, the third-best team in the league, the new Blitz were a lesser version of one of the worst teams in the league. The Blitz would never recover, and would be effectively euthanized at the end of the season (Eddie Einhorn was awarded a replacement Chicago franchise, but it never played a down).

=== 1984 season ===
The 1984 Wranglers finished in a tie for first in the Western Division. In the playoffs, they upset the powerful Houston Gamblers, then defeated the Los Angeles Express for the conference title. Although the Express had a better record, the game was played at Sun Devil Stadium because the Express' home field, Los Angeles Memorial Coliseum, was being readied for the 1984 Summer Olympics. To accommodate the oppressive summer heat in the state, as well as the ABC Sports television schedule, the game kicked off at 8:30 p.m. local time (11:30 p.m. Eastern time).

The Wranglers' run ended in the championship game with a 23–3 defeat by the Philadelphia Stars in what would be Allen's last game as a professional coach. Quarterback Greg Landry retired after the season. Allen retired as coach in September 1984, but remain involved with the team. Allen named assistant coach Paul Lanham as head coach.

The Wranglers intended to change to red jerseys for the 1984 season, but the league office had put in a rule that stated any team changing jersey colors (in this case, blue to red) had to wait one season before doing so. This forced Arizona to wear its white jerseys the entire season.

==== Schedule ====
| Week | Date | Opponent | Result | Record | Venue | Attendance |
|---|---|---|---|---|---|---|
Preseason
| 1 | January 29 | Oakland Invaders | W 6–0 | 1–0 | Sun Devil Stadium | |
| 2 | Bye | | | | | |
| 3 | February 11 | vs. Denver Gold | L 14–31 | 1–1 | Casa Grande, Arizona | |
| 4 | Bye | | | | | |
Regular Season
| 1 | February 26 | Oakland Invaders | W 35–7 | 1–0 | Sun Devil Stadium | 29,176 |
| 2 | March 2 | Tampa Bay Bandits | L 17–20 | 1–1 | Sun Devil Stadium | 31,264 |
| 3 | March 12 | Washington Federals | W 37–7 | 2–1 | Sun Devil Stadium | 25,218 |
| 4 | March 18 | at Michigan Panthers | L 26–31 | 2–2 | Pontiac Silverdome | 43,130 |
| 5 | March 24 | Oklahoma Outlaws | W 49–7 | 3–2 | Sun Devil Stadium | 29,434 |
| 6 | April 1 | at Denver Gold | L 7–17 | 3–3 | Mile High Stadium | 31,666 |
| 7 | April 8 | Philadelphia Stars | L 21–22 | 3–4 | Sun Devil Stadium | 30,252 |
| 8 | April 15 | at New Jersey Generals | W 20–3 | 4–4 | Giants Stadium | 31,917 |
| 9 | April 21 | at Houston Gamblers | L 24–37 | 4–5 | Houston Astrodome | 23,117 |
| 10 | April 28 | San Antonio Gunslingers | L 23–24 | 4–6 | Sun Devil Stadium | 12,259 |
| 11 | May 7 | at New Orleans Breakers | W 28–13 | 5–6 | Louisiana Superdome | 22,937 |
| 12 | May 13 | at Oakland Invaders | L 3–14 | 5–7 | Oakland–Alameda County Coliseum | 20,004 |
| 13 | May 19 | Denver Gold | W 41–6 | 6–7 | Sun Devil Stadium | 21,741 |
| 14 | May 26 | at Los Angeles Express | L 17–24 | 6–8 | Los Angeles Memorial Coliseum | 11,702 |
| 15 | June 3 | at Birmingham Stallions | W 38–28 | 7–8 | Legion Field | 32,500 |
| 16 | June 8 | Jacksonville Bulls | W 45–14 | 8–8 | Sun Devil Stadium | 15,513 |
| 17 | June 15 | at Chicago Blitz | W 36–0 | 9–8 | Soldier Field | 5,711 |
| 18 | June 23 | Los Angeles Express | W 35–10 | 10–8 | Sun Devil Stadium | 35,258 |
Playoffs
| Divisional | July 1 | at Houston Gamblers | W 17–16 | 1–0 | Houston Astrodome | 32,713 |
| Conference | July 7 | Los Angeles Express | W 35–23 | 2–0 | Sun Devil Stadium | 33,188 |
| USFL Championship | July 15 | vs. Philadelphia Stars | L 3–23 | 2–1 | Tampa Stadium | 52,662 |

=== 1984 Arizona Wranglers Roster ===
1984 Arizona Wranglers roster
| Quarterbacks (QB): 11 Greg Landry; 8 Tom Porras; 7 Alan Risher; Running backs (RB): -- Mack Boatner FB; -- Allan Clark; -- Doug Dennison; 24 Randy Johnson; 33 Kevin Long FB; 46 Tim Spencer; Wide receivers (WR): -- Wamon Bugg; 82 Larry Douglas; -- Al Hill; 2 Trumaine Johnson; 85 Mark Tolbert; 89 Leonard Willis; Tight ends (TE): -- Clay Brown; -- Doug Cozen; -- Kerry Locklin; 86 Paul Ricker; -- Tim Wrightman | Offensive linemen (OL): 76 Frank Giddens T; 68 Dave Huffman G; -- Rick Kehr G; -- Jeff Kiewel G; -- John Stadnik T; -- Mark Stevenson G; 51 Gerry Sullivan C; 75 Rob Taylor T; 61 Tom Thayer G; -- Todd Thomas T; Defensive linemen (DL): -- Mark Buben DE; 74 Joe Ehrmann DT; -- Nick Epps DE; 72 Dallas Hickman DE; 64 John Lee DE; 70 Kit Lathrop DT; -- Karl Lorch DE; -- Robert Smith DE; -- Wilbur Young DT | Linebackers (LB): -- Derrick Casey; 55 Jim Fahnhorst; -- Doak Field; -- Bruce Gheesling; -- Andy Melontree; 56 Ed Smith; 52 Stan White; Defensive backs (DB): 32 Carl Allen CB; -- Ryan Barbieri SS; -- Luther Bradley FS; 25 Eddie Brown SS; 40 Bruce Laird SS; -- David McNair FS; 1 Frank Minnifield CB; 44 Lupe Sanchez CB; -- Don Schwartz SS; 22 Lance Shields CB; -- Ted Walton SS; Special teams (ST): 3 Frank Corral K/P; 50 Dave Ohton LS; -- Tom Piette LS | Rookies in italics |

1984 Arizona Wranglers staff
| Front office: Owner – Dr. Ted Diethrich; Head coaches: Head coach – George Allen; Offensive coaches: Quarterbacks – Roman Gabriel; Offensive backs – Ray Wietecha; Offensive line – John Payne | Defensive coaches: Defensive line – John Teerlinck; Defensive backs – Donald "Deek" Pollard; Strength and conditioning: Strength & Conditioning – Warren Anderson |

=== Merger with the Oklahoma Outlaws ===
Despite making it to the championship game, Diethrich was bleeding in red ink. He expected his all-star team's attendance to be much greater than the 25,776 fans per game the no-name Wranglers averaged in 1983. However, as had been the case a year earlier, Phoenix-area fans viewed the Wranglers mostly with indifference. Despite fielding a winning team, the Wranglers' 1984 attendance figures (25,568 fans per game) were lower than the 1983 numbers, as fans were slow to warm to the new players. It did not help matters that Hoffman had walked away from the Blitz during the preseason and had stopped payment on the installment plan he had brokered with Diethrich.

After losing millions for the second year in a row and realizing that he would never see the remainder of the $7.2 million that Hoffman had promised to pay him for the Blitz, Diethrich decided to get out. He found a willing buyer in Oklahoma Outlaws owner William Tatham, who was looking for a larger market with an acceptable stadium. The two men reached a deal in which the two teams would be merged as the Arizona Outlaws. The Outlaws would be the nominal survivor; the Tathams would own a 75 percent controlling interest with Diethrich retaining 25 percent. However, ex-Wranglers were to make up a majority of the offseason roster. When Diethrich suggested that the merged team might have to file for bankruptcy, the merger fell apart, and Diethrich decided to get out of the league altogether. As a result, the deal was restructured so that the Wranglers folded and the Outlaws took their place in Phoenix. However, since Tatham acquired all the Wranglers' player contracts–including almost all of the 1984 Wranglers defense–the deal was still widely reported as a merger.

== Statistics and records ==
=== Season-by-season record ===
Note: The finish, wins, losses, and ties columns list regular season results and exclude any postseason play.

Legend
| USFL champions | Conference champions | Division champions | Wild Card berth |

Arizona Wranglers season-by-season records
| Season | Team | League | Conference | Division | Regular season | | | | Postseason results | Awards |
| Season | Team | League | Conference | Division | Finish | Wins | Losses | Ties | Postseason results | Awards |
|---|---|---|---|---|---|---|---|---|---|---|
| 1983 | 1983 | USFL | | Pacific | 4th | 4 | 14 | 0 | – | – |
| 1984 | 1984 | USFL | Western | Pacific | 2nd | 10 | 8 | 0 | Won Divisional Playoff (Gamblers); Won Western Conference Championship (Express); Lost USFL championship (Stars) | – |

=== Records ===
Wranglers single season leaders
| Leader | Player | Record | Season |
|---|---|---|---|
| Passing | Greg Landry | 3,534 passing yards | 1984 |
| Rushing | Tim Spencer | 1,207 rushing yards | 1984 |
| Receiving | Trumaine Johnson | 1,258 receiving yards | 1984 |
