= 1983 Birmingham Stallions season =

Defunct football team in the USFL

- Owner: Marvin L. Warner
- Head coach: Rollie Dotsch
- Home stadium: Legion Field

Results
- Record: 4–14
- Division place: 4th Pacific Division
- Playoffs: Did not qualify

The 1983 season was the inaugural season for the Birmingham Stallions in the United States Football League. The Stallions were led by head coach Rollie Dotsch and finished with a 4–14 record.

== Schedule ==
Week	Date	Opponent	Result	Record	Venue	Attendance
1	March 7	Michigan Panthers	L7–9	0–1	Legion Field	30,305
2	March 13	at Oakland Invaders	W 20–14 (OT)	1–1	Oakland–Alameda County Coliseum	47,344
3	March 21	Philadelphia Stars	L 10–17	1–2	Legion Field	12,850
4	March 26	Arizona Wranglers	W 16–7	2–2	Legion Field	5,000
5	April 2	at Boston Breakers	L 16–27	2–3	Nickerson Field	10,976
6	April 10	at Chicago Blitz	L 11–22	2–4	Soldier Field	13,859
7	April 17	Denver Gold	L 7–9	2–5	Legion Field	26,250
8	April 24	Oakland Invaders	W 21–9	3–5	Legion Field	18,500
9	May 1	at Washington Federals	W 35–3	4–5	RFK Stadium	12,818
10	May 9	at New Jersey Generals	W 22–7	5–5	Giants Stadium	38,734
11	May 14	Los Angeles Express	W 35–20	6–5	Legion Field	42,212
12	May 23	at Michigan Panthers	W23-20	7–5	Pontiac Silverdome	20,042
13	May 27	at Denver Gold	L 19–21	7–6	Mile High Stadium	38,829
14	June 5	at Tampa Bay Bandits	L 17–45	7–7	Tampa Stadium	35,623
15	June 12	Boston Breakers	W 31–19	8–7	Legion Field	20,500
16	June 17	Chicago Blitz	L 14–29	8–8	Legion Field	22,500
17	June 26	at Philadelphia Stars	L 10–31	8–9	Veterans Stadium	17,973
18	July 2	Tampa Bay Bandits	W 29–17	9–9	Legion Field	20,300

== Standings ==
USFL Central Division
	W	L	T	PCT	DIV	PF	PA	STK
Michigan Panthers	12	6	0	.667	4–2	451	337	W4
Chicago Blitz	12	6	0	.667	4–2	456	271	W1
Tampa Bay Bandits	11	7	0	.611	2–4	363	378	L1
Birmingham Stallions	9	9	0	.500	2–4	343	326	W1

== Statistics ==
=== 1983 Birmingham Stallions statistics ===
No.	Rushing	Pos	GP-GS	Car	Yds	Avg	Lng	TDs
32	Ken Talton	FB	15-11	228	907	4.0	28	5
23	Earl Gant	RB	17-14	133	530	4.0	19	2
40	Cornelius Quarles	FB	15-7	107	495	4.6	39	3
45	Billy White	RB	16-4	117	349	3.0	14	2
10	Reggie Collier	QB	8-5	39	253	6.5	30	4
30	Lonnie Johnson	RB	11-0	52	181	3.5	22	3
12	Bobby Lane	RB	18-13	42	178	4.2	32	3
11	Melvin Williams	QB	10-0	7	58	8.3	17	0
86	Jim Smith	WR	12-10	5	39	7.8	21	0
82	Ron Frederick	WR	15-4	4	19	4.8	17	0
31	John Skibinski	FB	17-0	6	13	2.2	4	0
84	Sylvester Moy	WR	13-2	1	-5	-5.0	-5	0
	Total			741	3,017	4.1	39	22
	Opponents			520	2,330	4.5	73	18

No.	Passing	Pos	GP-GS	Cmp-Att	Yds	Lng	Pct	TD	IC	Skd	Lost
12	Bobby Lane	QB	18-13	175-346	2,264	53	50.6%	14	18	15	106
10	Reggie Collier	QB	8-5	47-108	604	46	43.5%	1	7	14	132
11	Melvin Williams	QB	10-0	9-21	131	39	42.9%	0	2	1	5
	Total			231-475	2,999	53	48.6%	15	27	30	243
	Opponents			278-554	3,520	81	50.2%	22	22	51	414

No.	Receiving	Pos	GP-GS	Rec	Yds	Avg	Lng	TDs
86	Jim Smith	WR	12-10	51	756	14.8	39	3
81	Darryl Mason	TE	18-18	45	547	12.2	33	2
83	Greg Anderson	WR	18-16	28	529	18.9	50	5
23	Earl Gant	RB	17-14	24	299	12.5	37	1
32	Ken Talton	RB	15-11	21	156	7.4	25	0
82	Ron Frederick	WR	15-4	16	290	18.1	46	2
84	Sylvester Moy	WR	13-2	12	203	16.9	53	0
40	Cornelius Quarles	FB	15-7	12	86	7.2	17	0
45	Billy White	RB	16-4	7	47	6.7	8	0
88	Steve Stephens	TE	14-3	6	36	6.0	17	1
85	Johnnie Dirden	WR	8-0	3	22	7.3	12	0
31	John Skibinski	FB	17-0	2	13	6.5	8	0
30	Lonnie Johnson	RB/KR	11-0	2	12	6.0	16	1
80	Mike Kincaid	WR/KR	10-0	1	3	3.0	3	0
4	Scott Norwood	K	18-0	1	0	0.0	0	0
	Total			231	2,999	13.0	53	15
	Opponents			278	3,520	12.7	81	22

No.	Kickoff returns	Pos	GP-GS	KOR	Yds	Avg	Lng	TDs
80	Mike Kincaid	WR/KR	10-0	19	404	21.3	43	0
85	Johnnie Dirden	WR/KR	8-0	16	322	20.1	41	0
30	Lonnie Johnson	RB/KR	11-0	10	190	19.0	39	0
21	Charles Grandjean	SS	18-6	8	97	12.1	26	0
87	Kevin Miller	WR	5-1	2	34	17.0	21	0
45	Billy White	WR	16-4	1	27	27.0	27	0
82	Ron Frederick	WR	15-4	1	14	14.0	14	0
40	Charlie Trotman	CB	3-0	1	11	11.0	11	0
59	Mark Battaglia	G/C	18-11	1	10	10.0	10	0
57	Dallas Hickman	LB	18-16	1	0	0.0	0	0
	Total			60	1,109	18.5	43	0
	Opponents			71	1,183	16.7	67	0

No.	Punt returns	Pos	GP-GS	PR	FC	Yds	Avg	Lng	TDs
82	Ron Frederick	WR/KR	15-4	23	6	170	7.4	15	0
80	Mike Kincaid	WR/KR	10-0	15	1	100	6.7	14	0
45	Billy White	RB	16-4	1	0	15	15.0	15	0
87	Kevin Miller	WR/KR	5-1	4	1	6	1.5	3	0
85	Johnnie Dirden	WR/KR	8-0	1	0	0	0.0	0	0
32	Ken Talton	FB	15-11	1	0	0	0.0	0	0
	Total			45	8	291	6.5	15	0
	Opponents			45	7	380	8.4	31	0

No.	Kicking	Pos	GP-GS	FGM	FGA	XPM	XPA	PTS
4	Scott Norwood	K	18-0	25	34	34	35	109
	Total			25	34	34	35	109
	Opponents			14	27	34	37	76

No.	PUNTING	Pos	GP-GS	Pnt	Yds	Avg	Lng	TB	In20
7	Alan Bollinger	P	11-0	51	2,008	39.4	56	7	11
8	Skip Johnston	P	4-0	21	870	41.4	63	2	2
8	Dario Casarino	P	3-0	12	437	36.4	52	1	1
	Total			84	3,315	39.5	63	9	13
	Opponents			88	3,674	41.8	70	8	27

No.	Defense	Pos	GP-GS	Tkl	Ast	Tot	Skd	PD	FR	IC	Yds
55	Herb Spencer	LB	16-12	83	22	105	7.5	5	2	1	42
44	Billy Cesare	SS	18-18	66	23	89	0.0	18	2	4	52
53	Rich D'Amico	LB	16-16	71	13	84	1.0	0	2	0	0
57	Dallas Hickmam	LB	18-16	61	14	75	6.5	3	0	1	7
28	Frank Reed	CB	15-14	59	14	73	1.0	13	1	3	24
75	Jimmy Walker	NT	18-16	49	14	63	5.0	3	1	1	27
20	Emmuel Thompson	CB	18-13	48	10	58	0.0	19	0	5	24
98	Jackie Cline	DE	17-16	38	11	49	5.5	0	1	0	0
49	Mike Thomas	FS	18-17	41	8	49	0.0	12	0	2	27
97	Reggie Lewis	DE	14-3	33	15	48	2.0	0	0	0	0
79	Mike Raines	DE	17-13	31	17	48	8.0	2	0	0	0
50	Larry McPherson	LB	16-16	29	14	43	4.0	0	2	4	55
21	Charles Grandjean	CB	18-6	26	12	38	0.0	0	0	0	0
42	Mike Hatchett	SS	18-0	23	11	34	0.0	0	0	0	0
56	Mike Murphy	LB	13-2	27	5	32	1.5	0	0	0	0
26	David Evans	CB	4-3	21	7	28	0.0	2	0	0	0
96	Charles Martin	NT	14-2	20	7	27	0.0	0	1	0	0
51	Freddie Smith	LB	9-2	11	3	14	3.0	0	0	0	0
99	Moochie Allen	NT	7-0	6	7	13	0.5	0	0	0	0
77	Drew Taylor	DE	7-4	10	0	10	4.5	0	0	0	0
63	Brett Williams	DE	5-0	3	3	6	1.0	0	0	0	0
60	Melvin Land	LB	7-4	5	1	6	0.0	0	0	1	9
24	Charlie Trotman	CB	3-0	3	1	4	0.0	0	0	0	0
90	Wendell Ray	LB	3-2	3	0	3	0.0	0	0	0	0
58	Lester Dickey	LB	2-2	2	1	3	0.0	0	0	0	0
38	David Smilo	FS	6-1	2	1	3	0.0	0	0	0	0
51	Carl McGee	LB	2-0	0	0	0	0.0	0	0	0	0
	Total			771	234	1,005	51.0	77	12	22	267
	Opponents			---	---	---	30.0	--	--	27	283

No.	Offensive linemen	Pos	GP-GS
72	Robert Woods	LT	16-15
71	Pat Phenix	RT	16-16
70	Mark Goodspeed	OT	1-0
78	Buddy Aydelette	LG/T	18-18
59	Mark Battaglia	RG	18-11
74	Pat Saindon	RG	10-6
64	Mike Turner	RG/T	14-2
69	Bill Searcey	OG	5-0
54	Tom Banks	C	18-18
