= Birmingham Stallions =

Football team in Birmingham, Alabama

General information
- Founded: 1982
- Folded: 1985
- Headquartered: Legion Field in Birmingham, Alabama
- Colors: Red, Gold, White

Personnel
- Owners: Marvin L. Warner; Others
- Head coach: 1983–1985 Rollie Dotsch (38–18)

Team history
- Birmingham Stallions (1983–1985)

Home fields
- Legion Field (1983–1985)

League / conference affiliations
- United States Football League (1982–1985): Eastern Conference (1982–1986); Central Division (1983); Southern Division (1984–1985)

Championships
- Division championships: 2; 1984, 1985

The Birmingham Stallions were a franchise in the United States Football League, an attempt to establish a second professional league of American football in the United States in competition with the National Football League. They played their home games at Birmingham, Alabama's Legion Field. They competed in all three USFL seasons, 1983–1985. During their run, they were one of the USFL's more popular teams and seemed to have a realistic chance of being a viable venture had the USFL been better run.

The owner was Cincinnati financier and Birmingham native Marvin Warner. The team's coach was Rollie Dotsch, who was previously the offensive line coach of the Pittsburgh Steelers during its Super Bowl years and ended up with the second most wins in USFL history. The Stallions starting quarterback for their final two seasons was Cliff Stoudt, a long-time backup to Terry Bradshaw with the Steelers. Stoudt had finally taken over for the injured Bradshaw in 1983 and had played very well for the first half of the season, but his game fell apart in the second half of the season, leading Steeler fans to harshly turn on him. After the season, Stoudt quickly decided it was not worth staying in Pittsburgh and signed with the Stallions. (Amusingly, the expansion Pittsburgh Maulers' lone sellout was the game where Cliff Stoudt returned to Pittsburgh. Steeler fans pelted the hated Stoudt with snowballs throughout the game, but Stoudt and Birmingham won, 30–18.)

In Birmingham, Stoudt proved to be an excellent QB, finishing in the league's top 5 in 1984 and 1985, among such peers as Jim Kelly and Chuck Fusina and leading the team to two divisional titles. The Stallions also added Bills star HB Joe Cribbs in 1984. Cribbs led the league in rushing in 1984 and finished 6th in 1985. Former Steeler WR Jim Smith was another of the team's stars. Many other Stallions players would play in the NFL once the USFL went out of existence.

== 1983 season ==
Warner was initially slated to be the owner of the USFL's Washington franchise–what became the Washington Federals. However, when he learned that the USFL was putting a franchise in his hometown, he jumped at it. Without Warner's wealth behind them, the Federals were forced to abandon the capital after two seasons and move to Orlando as the Renegades.

The Stallions scrambled to put a roster together after training camp and signed or claimed approximately 20 players via trades or waivers in the week prior to their first game. However, Dotsch managed to mold them into a fairly competitive team that finished 9-9.

Although the team made a splash in signing their first-round draft pick, quarterback Reggie Collier out of Southern Mississippi, the remainder of the Stallions consisted of mostly unsung former NFL reserves and college free agents.

One of the few pro veterans signed was center Tom Banks (a Birmingham native), who spent ten seasons with the St. Louis Cardinals. Banks played 116 NFL games (starting 63) while with the Cardinals and was brought in by coach Rollie Dotsch to serve as a mentor to a very young club. Banks eventually retired after the 1984 Stallions' season and became an assistant coach on the Birmingham staff in 1985.

Other NFL veterans who signed with the Stallions included former Kansas City Chief RB Earl Gant (2 years, 20 games with the Chiefs), RB Ken Talton (1 year, 2 games with the Lions), WR/KR Kevin Miller (3 years, 20 games with the Vikings), TE Steve Stephens (1 year, 16 games with the Jets), OT Robert Woods (8 years, 99 games with the Jets and Saints), OG Buddy Aydelette (1 year, 9 games with the Packers), DE Mike Raines (7 years, 104 games with the CFL Ottawa Rough Riders), DE Reggie P. Lewis (2 years, 22 games with the Buccaneers), LB Dallas Hickman (6 years, 91 games with the Redskins), CB Mike Thomas (6 years, 77 games with the Redskins and Chargers) and SS Billy Cesare (5 years, 46 games with the Buccaneers, Dolphins and Lions),

The Stallions had some success in signing several of their 1983 draft picks to go along with Collier. Guard Pat Saindon (8th round, Vanderbilt), nose tackle Charles Martin (15th round, Livingston College) and reserve guard Mike Turner (16th round, Louisiana State). Martin would go on to play for the Green Bay Packers and was involved in an infamous bodyslam tackle of Chicago Bears QB Jim McMahon in 1986 at Soldier Field. They also signed two key territorial draft selections in defensive end Jackie Cline from Alabama and offensive tackle Pat Phenix from Ole' Miss.

The Stallions also signed a rookie free agent named Scott Norwood who would later be infamous as the Buffalo Bills kicker who missed a field goal in the dying minutes of the Super Bowl in 1990.

After dropping their opening game on a Monday night (9-7, at home to the Michigan Panthers) the Stallions rebounded on the road the following week with a 20–14 overtime victory in Oakland against the Invaders to record their first franchise win.

However, the Stallions struggled out of the gate with a 2–5 record as Coach Rollie Dotsch and his staff put a patchwork, blue-collar, run-oriented club together.

Prior to the Stallions' sixth game of the season, former Pittsburgh Steelers wide receiver Jim Smith (6 years, 73 games with the Steelers) was signed by Dotsch to add some punch to a listless receiving corps. Smith did not disappoint as his arrival helped the offense almost immediately. Dotsch was very familiar with Smith as they were members of two Super Bowl Championship clubs in the Steel City.

The turning point in the season, however, was during a home game in Week #8 (Sunday, April 24) against the Oakland Invaders when backup quarterback Bobby Lane took the reins of the Stallions offense from Collier, who struggled with injuries and inconsistency.

Lane's heroics won the game vs. Oakland and the Stallions went on to win four subsequent games that improved their record to a 7–5 mark. However, the club managed to only win two of their last six games to finish with a 9–9 mark and a fourth-place finish in the Central Division.

All four teams in the USFL Central Division in 1983 were at .500 or above (Michigan 12–6, Chicago 12-6 and Tampa Bay 11-7 all recorded strong campaigns).

The biggest game of the 1983 season for the Stallions came in Week #11 on a Saturday night (May 14, 1983) when they defeated the visiting Los Angeles Express, 35–20, in front of the largest crowd of the year at Legion Field (42,212). The crowd featured over 20,000 people from the families of local steel and Iron workers unions.

The following week, the Stallions went on the road and defeated the eventual USFL Champion Michigan Panthers, 23–20 at the Pontiac Silverdome. The game was highlighted by a disputed touchdown late in the game when a Michigan defender intercepted a ball in the end zone, spiked the ball and had it recovered by a Stallions' player before the play was blown dead.

Birmingham finished the season as the top rushing club in the USFL with 3,017 yards on 701 carries, however, the Stallions ranked 11th in the 12-team loop with 2,999 yards passing.

Late in the season, the club also announced the signing of former Buffalo Bills running back Joe Cribbs, who would join the club at the start of the 1984 season. Cribbs, who played his college ball locally for the Auburn Tigers, signed a three-year contract with the Stallions.

=== 1983 Birmingham Stallions opening day roster ===
1983 Birmingham Stallions roster
Quarterbacks (QB): 10 Reggie Collier; 12 Bobby Lane; Running backs (RB): 23 Earl Gant; 31 John Skibinski FB; 32 Ken Talton FB; 45 Billy White; Wide receivers (WR): 83 Greg Anderson; 82 Ron Frederick; 80 Mike Kincaid; 87 Kevin Miller; Tight ends (TE): 85 Mike Hirn; 81 Darryl Mason; 88 Steve Stephens	Offensive linemen (OL): 78 Buddy Aydelette LG; 54 Tom Banks C; 59 Mark Battaglia RG; 71 Pat Phenix RT; 74 Pat Saindon RG; 72 Robert Woods LT; Defensive linemen (DL): 98 Jackie Cline LDE; 76 Reggie Lewis DE; 96 Charles Martin NT; 79 Mike Raines RDE; 75 Jimmy Walker NT	Linebackers (LB): 58 Lester Dickey RILB; 57 Dallas Hickman LB/DE; 51 Carl McGee LB; 50 Larry McPherson LILB; 56 Mike Murphy ROLB; 90 Wendell Ray LOLB; Defensive backs (DB): 20 Emmuel Thompson LCB; 49 Mike Thomas RCB; 28 Frank Reed CB; 21 Charles Grandjean CB; 44 Billy Cesare SS; 24 Charlie Trotman FS; 42 Mike Hatchett SS; Special teams (ST): 17 Dario Casarino P; 52 Tim James LS; 4 Scott Norwood K	Reserve: 89 Johnnie Dirden WR/KR; 70 Mark Goodspeed OT; 30 Lonnie Johnson RB/KR; 84 Sylvester Moy WR; 40 Cornelius Quarles FB; 69 Bill Searcey OG/C; 55 Herb Spencer LB; 64 Mike Turner OG; 63 Brett Williams DE; 11 Melvin Williams QB; Rookies in italics 40 active, 10 reserve

=== 1983 Birmingham Stallions schedule ===
Week	Date	Opponent	Result	Record	Venue	Attendance
1	March 7	Michigan Panthers	L7–9	0–1	Legion Field	30,305
2	March 13	at Oakland Invaders	W 20–14 (OT)	1–1	Oakland–Alameda County Coliseum	47,344
3	March 21	Philadelphia Stars	L 10-17	1–2	Legion Field	12,850
4	March 26	Arizona Wranglers	W 16–7	2–2	Legion Field	5,000
5	April 2	at Boston Breakers	L 16–27	2–3	Nickerson Field	10,976
6	April 10	at Chicago Blitz	L 11–22	2–4	Soldier Field	13,859
7	April 17	Denver Gold	L 7–9	2–5	Legion Field	26,250
8	April 24	Oakland Invaders	W 21–9	3–5	Legion Field	18,500
9	May 1	at Washington Federals	W 35–3	4–5	RFK Stadium	12,818
10	May 9	at New Jersey Generals	W 22–7	5–5	Giants Stadium	38,734
11	May 14	Los Angeles Express	W 35–20	6–5	Legion Field	42,212
12	May 23	at Michigan Panthers	W23-20	7–5	Pontiac Silverdome	20,042
13	May 27	at Denver Gold	L 19–21	7–6	Mile High Stadium	38,829
14	June 5	at Tampa Bay Bandits	L 17–45	7–7	Tampa Stadium	35,623
15	June 12	Boston Breakers	W 31–19	8–7	Legion Field	20,500
16	June 17	Chicago Blitz	L 14–29	8–8	Legion Field	22,500
17	June 26	at Philadelphia Stars	L 10–31	8–9	Veterans Stadium	17,973
18	July 2	Tampa Bay Bandits	W 29–17	9–9	Legion Field	20,300

=== 1983 Birmingham Stallions numerical roster ===
No.	Name	Pos	Ht.	Wt.	College	GP/GS
4	Scott Norwood	K	6.00	207	James Madison	18/0
8	Skip Johnston	P	6.01	175	Auburn	4/0
9	Alan Bollinger	P	6.01	190	Auburn	11/0
10	Reggie Collier	QB	6.03	207	Southern Mississippi	8/5
11	Melvin Williams	QB	6.03	200	Mississippi Valley State	10/0
12	Bobby Lane	QB	6.03	205	Louisiana State	18/13
14	Jay Venuto	QB	6.01	195	Wake Forest	IA/7G
21	Charles Grandjean	SS	5.11	200	Kent State	18/6
23	Earl Gant	RB	6.00	207	Missouri	17/14
24	Charlie Trotman	SS	5.10	185	Auburn	3/0
26	David Evans	CB	6.00	170	Central Arkansas	4/3
28	Frank Reed	CB	5.11	193	Washington	15/14
30	Lonnie Johnson	RB/KR	6.01	206	Indiana	11/0
31	John Skibinski	FB	6.00	222	Purdue	17/0
32	Ken Talton	FB	6.00	209	Cornell	15/11
37	David Smilo	SS	6.02	190	Eastern Michigan	6/1
40	Cornelius Quarles	FB	6.00	220	Howard	15/7
42	Mike Hatchett	FS	5.10	176	Texas	18/0
44	Billy Cesare	FS	5.11	190	Miami (Fl.)	18/18
45	Billy White	RB	5.11	196	Missouri	16/4
49	Mike Thomas	CB/FS	6.00	175	Tennessee State	18/17
50	Larry McPherson	LB	6.00	225	Fort Valley State	16/16
51	Carl McGee	LB	6.03	228	Duke	2/0
51	Freddie Smith	LB	5.11	219	Auburn	9/2
52	Tim James	C/LS	6.03	250	Elon College	2/0
53	Rich D'Amico	LB	6.02	238	Penn State	16/16
54	Tom Banks	C	6.01	255	Auburn	18/18
55	Herb Spencer	LB	6.03	225	Newberry College	16/12
56	Mike Murphy	LB	6.02	222	Southwest Missouri State	13/2
57	Dallas Hickman	LB/DE	6.06	238	California	18/16
58	Lester Dickey	LB	6.01	225	Missouri	2/2
58	Sammy Green	LB	6.00	223	Alabama State	IA/7G
59	Mark Battaglia	G	6.02	255	Penn State	18/11
60	Melvin Land	LB	6.03	242	Michigan State	7/4
63	Brett Williams	DE	6.03	260	Austin Peay	5/0
64	Mike Turner	G/T	6.03	254	Louisiana State	14/2
65	Joe Bock	C/LS	6.04	256	Virginia	16/0
69	Bill Searcey	G	6.02	270	Alabama	5/0
70	Mark Goodspeed	T	6.05	270	Nebraska	1/0
71	Pat Phenix	T	6.05	275	Mississippi	16/16
72	Robert Woods	T	6.05	250	Tennessee State	16/15
74	Pat Saindon	G	6.03	273	Vanderbilt	16/10
75	Jimmy Walker	NT	6.02	250	Arkansas	18/16
76	Reggie Lewis	DE	6.03	260	North Texas State	14/3
77	Drew Taylor	DE	6.05	225	San Jose State	7/4
78	Buddy Aydelette	G	6.04	256	Alabama	18/18
79	Mike Raines	DE	6.05	260	Alabama	17/13
80	Mike Kincaid	WR/KR	5.04	165	Mississippi College	10/0
81	Darryl Mason	TE	6.01	220	Arkansas	18/18
82	Ron Frederick	WR/PR	5.11	180	Duke	15/4
83	Greg Anderson	WR	5.10	170	Alabama State	18/16
84	Sylvester Moy	WR	6.00	180	Grambling State	13/2
85	Mike Hirn	TE	6.03	234	Central Michigan	6/0
86	Jim Smith	WR	6.02	205	Michigan	12/10
87	Kevin Miller	WR/KR	5.10	180	Louisville	5/1
88	Steve Stephens	TE	6.03	227	Oklahoma State	14/3
89	Johnnie Dirden	WR/KR	6.00	190	Sam Houston State	8/0
90	Wendell Ray	LB	6.04	233	Missouri	3/2
96	Charles Martin	NT	6.04	276	Livingston College	14/2
98	Jackie Cline	DE	6.04	275	Alabama	17/16
99	Moochie Allen	NT	6.04	258	Southern Mississippi	7/0

=== 1983 Birmingham Stallions end-of-season roster ===
Birmingham Stallions 1983 End of Season Roster (at 2-Jul-83)
Quarterbacks: 12 Bobby Lane; 11 Melvin Williams; Running backs: 23 Earl Gant RB; 30 Lonnie Johnson RB/KR; 32 Ken Talton FB; 31 John Skibinski FB; 40 Cornelius Quarles FB; Wide receivers Ron Frederick: 86 Jim Smith; 84 Sylvester Moy; 83 Greg Anderson; 80 Mike Kincaid; Tight ends: 81 Darryl Mason; 88 Steve Stephens	Offensive linemen: 72 Robert Woods LT; 71 Pat Phenix RT; 78 Buddy Aydelette LG; 59 Mark Battaglia RG; 64 Mike Turner G; 74 Pat Saindon G; 69 Bill Searcey G; 54 Tom Banks C; Defensive linemen: 75 Jimmy Walker NT; 96 Charles Martin NT; 99 Moochie Allen NT; 98 Jackie Cline LDE; 70 Drew Taylor RDE; 79 Mike Raines DE	Linebackers: 95 Herb Spencer LOLB; 51 Freddie Smith LILB; 53 Rich D'Amico RILB; 57 Dallas Hickman LB/DE; 56 Mike Murphy LB; 60 Melvin Land LB; Defensive backs: 26 David Evans LCB; 49 Mike Thomas RCB; 20 Emmuel Thompson CB; 44 Billy Cesare SS; 37 David Smilo FS; 21 Charles Grandjean SS; 42 Mike Hatchett SS; Special teams: 4 Scott Norwood K; 8 Skip Johnston P; 65 Joe Bock LS	Developmental squad: 14 Jay Venuto QB; 45 Billy White RB; 40 Cornelius Quarles FB; 71 Pat Phenix OT; 70 Mark Goodspeed OT; 76 Reggie Lewis DE; 50 Larry McPherson LB; 28 Frank Reed FS; 56 Danny Crosby LB	Injured Reserve: 10 Reggie Collier QB; 90 Wendell Ray LB; 58 Sammy Green LB; T rookies in italics 43 active, 7 developmental

== 1984 season ==
With the off-season signing of former NFL'ers quarterback Cliff Stoudt, running back Joe Cribbs, full back Leon Perry, defensive end Dave Pureifory and CFL cornerback Ricky Ray, the Stallions outlook for the 1984 campaign was bright.

Coach Dotsch shored up several areas, including the defensive line where three players from the 1983 squad were let go. Also added to the lineup was a college free agent in safety Chuck Clanton who burst onto the scene with the Stallions in 1984 as a major force on a re-build defense.

The Stallions also employed a re-vamped defense with a regular "Nickel" formation featuring, two linebackers and 5 defensive backs – one of the first defenses of its kind utilized in the USFL (the San Antonio Gunslingers were the other team to feature the nickel defense as well in 1984). They already had a reputation as a hard-hitting team, which was thought to be carried over from Dotsch's days with the Steelers.

The Stallions' first game of the 1984 campaign was before a league record 62,500 fans at Legion Field against another re-constructed club in the New Jersey Generals. With the Generals arriving in town like a circus with new owner Donald Trump, running back Herschel Walker and quarterback Brian Sipe in tow, Birmingham was abuzz with anticipation for the new season.

The opening game against New Jersey was broadcast on national television on ABC, however, the Stallions were listless in a 17–6 loss to the Generals to start the season.

However, the game would mark the start of a nine-game unbeaten streak that took the Stallions into a May 6 contest at Legion Field with a 9–1 record against the 9-1 Philadelphia Stars. In its biggest game since the opener against New Jersey, the Stallions came up flat in a 43-11 spanking at the hands of the Stars who would go on to win the 1984 USFL Championship.

The game against the Stars drew a crowd of 49,500, however, the loss sullied interest in the team for the rest of the season as the club averaged only averaged 27,000 fans per game for their last four home games, despite chalking up a 14–4 record. The decline was also blamed on the USFL's decision in May to move to a fall schedule for the 1986 season – a scenario that transpired in several USFL markets.

With their 14–4 mark, the Stallions captured the Southern Division Championship and a berth in the USFL playoffs with a 35–20 win over the Memphis Showboats in Week #17 at a sold-out Liberty Bowl.

In the Eastern Conference Semi-Finals, the Stallions defeated their southern division rivals the Tampa Bay Bandits with a convincing 36–16 win at Legion Field in front of 32,000.

One week later, the Stallions dropped the Eastern Conference Championship, 20–10 to the Philadelphia Stars in a game played at Franklin Field. The venue was moved to the University of Pennsylvania campus when Veterans Stadium was occupied by the Philadelphia Phillies.

=== 1984 Birmingham Stallions opening day roster ===
Birmingham Stallions 1984 Opening Day Roster (at 26-Feb-84)
Quarterbacks: 18 Cliff Stoudt; 12 Bobby Lane; Running backs: 20 Joe Cribbs RB; 23 Earl Gant RB; 33 Lonnie Johnson RB/KR; 32 Ken Talton FB; 30 Leon Perry FB; Wide receivers: 86 Jim Smith; 82 Ron Frederick; 4 Joey Jones; 85 Ken Toler; Tight ends: 81 Darryl Mason; 89 Robin Earl	Offensive linemen: 72 Robert Woods LT; 71 Pat Phenix RT; 78 Buddy Aydelette LG; 74 Pat Saindon RG; 59 Mark Battaglia G/C; 64 Mike Turner G; 54 Tom Banks C; Defensive linemen: 98 Jackie Cline LDT; 75 Jimmy Walker RDT; 95 Joe Cugliari DT; 78 Dave Pureifory LDE; 57 Dallas Hickman RDE; 69 Mike Perko DE; 90 Joe Gary DE	Linebackers: 55 Herb Spencer LLB; 52 Dan Gooch RLB; 56 Mike Murphy LB; 50 Milton Fields LB; 58 Taft Sales LB; Defensive backs: 21 Dennis Woodberry LCB; 27 Ricky Ray RCB; 41 Fred Bohannon FS; 26 David Evans NB; 24 Chuck Clanton FS; 34 Robert Gentry SS; Special teams: 4 Scott Norwood K; 8 Skip Johnston P	Developmental squad: 11 Phil Kessel, Sr. QB; 35 Mike Horton RB/KR; 25 Ken Simon RB; 80 Joe Hartsfield WR; 88 Jay Repko TE; 76 Phil Boren T; 97 Larry Curtis DT; 53 Thomas Boyd LB; 60 Dan Niederhofer LS	Injured Reserve: 63 Fred Anderson DE; 51 Max Jones LB; rookies in italics 40 active, 10 developmental

=== 1984 Birmingham Stallions schedule ===
Week	Date	Opponent	Result	Record	Venue	Attendance
Preseason
1	Bye					
2	Bye					
3	February 11	New Orleans Breakers	W 30–10	1–0	Legion Field	12,000
4	February 18	at San Antonio Gunslingers	W 23–15	2–0	Alamo Stadium	
Regular season
1	February 26	New Jersey Generals	L 6–17	0–1	Legion Field	62,500
2	March 4	at Los Angeles Express	W 21–14	1–1	Los Angeles Coliseum	14,789
3	March 11	at Pittsburgh Maulers	W 30–18	2–1	Three Rivers Stadium	53,771
4	March 17	Memphis Showboats	W 54–6	3–1	Legion Field	41,500
5	March 26	at Tampa Bay Bandits	W 27–9	4–1	Tampa Stadium	37,899
6	April 2	New Orleans Breakers	W 31–17	5–1	Legion Field	28,100
7	April 7	at Jacksonville Bulls	W 24–17	6–1	Gator Bowl	43,654
8	April 15	at Michigan Panthers	W 28–17	7–1	Pontiac Silverdome	42,655
9	April 21	Oklahoma Outlaws	W 41–17	8–1	Legion Field	41,653
10	April 29	at Denver Gold	W 31–14	9–1	Mile High Stadium	35,262
11	May 6	Philadelphia Stars	L 11–43	9–2	Legion Field	49,500
12	May 11	Jacksonville Bulls	W 42–10	10–2	Legion Field	29,500
13	May 18	at Chicago Blitz	W 41–7	11–2	Soldier Field	8,578
14	May 27	at New Orleans Breakers	W 31–14	12–2	Louisiana Superdome	23,748
15	June 3	Arizona Wranglers	L 28–38	12–3	Legion Field	32,500
16	June 10	Washington Federals	W 42–21	13–3	Legion Field	22,100
17	June 16	at Memphis Showboats	W 35–20	14–3	Liberty Bowl Memorial Stadium	50,079
18	June 23	Tampa Bay Bandits	L 16–17	14–4	Legion Field	24,500
Playoffs
Divisional	July 1	Tampa Bay Bandits	W 36–16	1–0	Legion Field	32,000
Conference Championship	July 8	at Philadelphia Stars	L 10–20	1–1	Franklin Field	26,616

=== 1984 Birmingham Stallions end-of-season roster ===
Birmingham Stallions 1984 End of Season Roster (at 24-Jun-84)
Quarterbacks: 18 Cliff Stoudt; 12 Bobby Lane; Running backs: 20 Joe Cribbs RB; 23 Earl Gant RB; 33 Lonnie Johnson RB/KR; 32 Ken Talton FB; 30 Leon Perry FB; 28 Andre Thomas FB; Wide receivers: 86 Jim Smith; 82 Ron Frederick; 4 Joey Jones; 85 Ken Toler; 80 Joe Hartsfield; Tight ends: 81 Darryl Mason; 89 Robin Earl; 88 Jay Repko	Offensive linemen: 72 Robert Woods LT; 71 Pat Phenix RT; 78 Buddy Aydelette LG; 74 Pat Saindon RG; 59 Mark Battaglia G/C; 64 Mike Turner G; 54 Tom Banks C; Defensive linemen: 98 Jackie Cline LDT; 95 Joe Cugliari RDT; 78 Dave Pureifory LDE; 69 Mike Perko DE; 99 Ronnie Paggett DE; 93 Ray Coley DE	Linebackers: 55 Herb Spencer LLB; 52 Billy Roe MLB; 58 Taft Sales RLB; 56 Mike Murphy LB; 53 Thomas Boyd LB; Defensive backs: 45 Von Mansfield LCB; 27 Ricky Ray RCB; 22 Don Burrell CB; 26 David Evans FS; 41 Fred Bohannon FS; 34 Robert Gentry SS; Special teams: 1 Danny Miller K; 89 Bob Parsons P	Developmental squad: 11 Phil Kessel, Sr. QB; 84 Jim Brown TE; 97 Larry Curtis DT; 52 Dan Gooch LB; 51 Max Jones LB; 21 Dennis Woodberry CB	Injured Reserve: 76 Phil Boren OT; 62 Scott LaFond OG; 4 Scott Norwood K; rookies in italics 43 active, 7 developmental

== 1985 season ==
After having a very successful 1984 season and coming to within a win of the USFL Championship game, the Stallions entered 1985 with high hopes. However, the team was nearly derailed in mid-season. On March 4, ESM Government Securities, a Florida-based securities dealer owned by Tampa Bay Bandits co-owner Steve Arky, was raided and shut down by the Securities and Exchange Commission. The ESM raid, and Arky's subsequent suicide, triggered a massive run on Home State Savings Bank, the Cincinnati-based savings and loan Warner controlled, resulting in its seizure by Ohio regulators.

With most of his money tied up in either Home State or the Stallions, Warner was forced to give up control of the Stallions just days after Home State's collapse. The league had required its owners to post a $1.3 million letter of credit for just such an emergency. Unfortunately, the Stallions' letter of credit was backed by Home State, rendering it worthless.

In response, team president Jerry Sklar urged the Stallions' limited partners to chip in more money, and persuaded the city government to buy a $100,000 stake in the team along with a $900,000 credit line. This allowed the Stallions to stay in business and remain in Birmingham.

More or less out of necessity, the Stallions exercised more fiscal responsibility in 1985 and made only minor upgrades to their roster in the off-season. The only notable addition during the off-season was defensive tackle Doug Smith who was a 2nd round pick by the Houston Oilers in 1984. Smith, an Auburn graduate, was a territorial selection of the Stallions in 1984, and signed with the Stallions after being unable to come to a contract agreement with the Oilers.

After acquiring the first overall pick in the 1985 USFL Open Draft, the Stallions selected a wide receiver from Mississippi Valley State University named Jerry Rice. The USFL draft was held in January 1985, however, when the NFL Draft was held four months later, Rice was considered a "project" by several NFL scouting staffs and dropped to the 16th overall pick to the San Francisco 49ers.

Although Rice signed with the 49ers, credit should be given to GM Jerry Sklar and his staff for realizing the potential of Rice well ahead of most other professional scouting staffs.

With the USFL from 18 to 14 teams, the Stallions also acquired some solid depth in safety David Dumars from the Denver Gold, offensive tackle Phil McKinnely from the Memphis Showboats, linebacker Ken Kelley from the Chicago Blitz and defensive back Mickey Sutton from the Pittsburgh Maulers.

Birmingham opened the season, as they did in 1984, by hosting the New Jersey Generals at Legion Field. The game featured the USFL debut of 1984 Heisman Trophy winner Doug Flutie at quarterback for the Generals. In front of 34,785 at Legion Field, the Stallions controlled the majority of the game and won their opener, 38–28 over New Jersey.

The Stallions jumped out to a 5–1 record in 1985 and finished the regular season on a 6-1 clip to claim the Eastern Conference title and the #2 seed in the USFL Playoffs with a 13-5-0 mark. Only the Oakland Invaders had a better record in 1985 with a 13-4-1 record.

Quarterback Cliff Stoudt had a solid season passing for 3,358 yards, 34 touchdowns and 19 interceptions. Stoudt's 34 touchdown passes was second only to Houston's Jim Kelly who tossed for 39 majors in 1985.

Stoudt's primary target in 1985 was wide receiver Jim Smith who had a career year catching a USFL record 20 touchdown passes. Smith caught 87 passes for a league leading 1,322 yards and was named to the USFL All-Star team.

Running back Joe Cribbs recorded his second consecutive 1,000+ yard season with 1,047 yards on 267 carries and 7 touchdowns.

Safety Chuck Clanton also set a professional football record with 16 interceptions in 1985 as he also added 275 returns yards and a major picking off passes. The NFL record of 14 in a season was set in 1952 by Dick 'Night Train' Lane of the Los Angeles Rams. The CFL record of 15 in a season was set in 1972 by Al Brenner of the Calgary Stampeders.

In the USFL Quarter-Final, the Stallions defeated the visiting Houston Gamblers 22–20, at Legion Field.

The following week, the Stallions hosted the defending champion, and nemesis, the Baltimore Stars at Legion Field. After losing to the Stars in the Eastern Conference final in 1984, the Stallions were hoping to exact revenge, however, they dropped a 28-14 decision to Baltimore in what would eventually be Birmingham's last USFL game.

=== 1985 Birmingham Stallions opening day roster ===
Birmingham Stallions 1985 Opening Day Roster (at 26-Feb-85)
Quarterbacks: 18 Cliff Stoudt; 12 Bobby Lane; Running backs: 20 Joe Cribbs RB; 23 Earl Gant RB; 42 Paul Ott Carruth RB/KR; 35 Joel Coles FB; 30 Leon Perry FB; Wide receivers: 86 Jim Smith; 80 Thad McFadden; 4 Joey Jones; 85 Ken Toler; Tight ends: 81 Darryl Mason; 89 Robin Earl	Offensive linemen: 73 Phil McKinnely LT; 79 Lindsey Mason RT; 78 Buddy Aydelette LG; 74 Pat Saindon RG; 59 Mark Battaglia C; 64 Mike Turner C/G; Defensive linemen: 98 Jackie Cline LDT; 97 Doug Smith RDT; 70 Malcolm Taylor DT; 78 Dave Pureifory LDE; 76 Don Reese RDE; 99 Ronnie Paggett DE; 91 Mike St. Clair DE	Linebackers: 55 Herb Spencer LLB; 52 Billy Roe MLB; 56 Ken Kelley RLB; 52 Thomas Boyd LB; 57 Doak Field LB; 58 Taft Sales LB; Defensive backs: 21 Dennis Woodberry LCB; 26 David Evans RCB; 25 Mickey Sutton CB; 43 Fletcher Louallen CB; 24 Chuck Clanton FS; 22 David Dumars SS; 31 Ted Walton FS; 40 Larry Friday SS; Special teams: 1 Danny Miller K; 87 Bob Parsons P; 65 Joe Bock LS	Developmental squad: 14 Tom Rozantz QB; 28 Andre Thomas RB; 84 Jim Brown TE; 71 Pat Phenix OT; 62 Scott LaFond OG; 90 Mike Simeta DT; 69 Mike Perko DE	Injured Reserve: None; rookies in italics 43 active, 7 developmental

=== 1985 Birmingham Stallions schedule ===
Week	Date	Opponent	Result	Record	Venue	Attendance
Preseason
1	February 2	at San Antonio Gunslingers	T 0–0	0–0–1	Alamo Stadium	
2	Bye					
3	February 16	Houston Gamblers	L 10–20	0–1–1	Legion Field	
Regular season
1	February 24	New Jersey Generals	W 38–28	1–0	Legion Field	34,785
2	March 3	Denver Gold	L 23–40	1–1	Legion Field	27,400
3	March 9	at Orlando Renegades	W 34–10	2–1	Orlando Stadium	25,831
4	March 16	Memphis Showboats	W 34–19	3–1	Legion Field	34,500
5	March 24	at Baltimore Stars	W 7–3	4–1	Byrd Stadium	14,529
6	March 30	Jacksonville Bulls	W 25–18	5–1	Legion Field	41,200
7	April 7	at San Antonio Gunslingers	L 14–15	5–2	Alamo Stadium	8,873
8	April 13	Oakland Invaders	W 20–17	6–2	Legion Field	44,500
9	April 20	Tampa Bay Bandits	W 30–3	7–2	Legion Field	28,900
10	April 28	at Jacksonville Bulls	L 17–27	7–3	Gator Bowl	41,298
11	May 3	at Memphis Showboats	L 24–38	7–4	Liberty Bowl Memorial Stadium	29,025
12	May 11	Portland Breakers	W 14–0	8–4	Legion Field	28,500
13	May 19	at Los Angeles Express	W 44–7	9–4	Los Angeles Coliseum	4,658
14	May 27	Orlando Renegades	W 41-17	10–4	Legion Field	24,500
15	June 3	at Houston Gamblers	W 29–27	11–4	Houston Astrodome	13,202
16	June 8	Baltimore Stars	W 14–7	12–4	Byrd Stadium	24,300
17	June 15	at Tampa Bay Bandits	L 14–17	12–5	Tampa Stadium	42,131
18	June 23	at New Jersey Generals	W 14–6	13–5	Giants Stadium	44,098
Playoffs
Quarterfinals	June 29	Houston Gamblers	W 22–20	1–0	Legion Field	18,500
Semifinals	July 7	Baltimore Stars	L 14–28	1–1	Legion Field	23,250

=== 1985 Birmingham Stallions end-of-season roster ===
Birmingham Stallions 1985 End of Season Roster (at 23-Jun-85)
Quarterbacks: 18 Cliff Stoudt; 12 Bobby Lane; Running backs: 20 Joe Cribbs RB; 42 Paul Ott Carruth RB/KR; 35 Joel Coles FB; 28 Andre Thomas FB; Wide receivers: 86 Jim Smith; 4 Joey Jones; 85 Ken Toler; 80 Thad McFadden; Tight ends: 81 Darryl Mason; 89 Robin Earl; 88 Jay Repko	Offensive linemen: 73 Phil McKinnely LT; 71 Pat Phenix RT; 72 Franky Smith T; 64 Mike Turner LG; 74 Pat Saindon RG; 62 Scott LaFond G; 59 Mark Battaglia G/C; Defensive linemen: 98 Jackie Cline LDT; 97 Doug Smith RDT; 70 Malcolm Taylor DT; 90 Mike Simeta DT; 78 Dave Pureifory LDE; 69 Mike Perko RDE; 99 Ronnie Paggett DE; 54 Dallas Hickman DE	Linebackers: 55 Herb Spencer LLB; 52 Billy Roe MLB; 56 Mike Kelley RLB; 57 Greg Gerken LB; 53 Thomas Boyd LB; Defensive backs: 21 Dennis Woodberry LCB; 26 David Evans RCB; 25 Mickey Sutton CB; 24 Chuck Clanton FS; 22 David Dumars SS; 31 Ted Walton SS; Special teams: 1 Danny Miller K; 89 Bob Parsons P; 65 Joe Bock LS	Developmental squad: 14 Tom Rozantz QB; 37 Ted Sample FB; 78 Buddy Aydelette OG; 76 Don Reese DE; 43 Fletcher Louallen CB; 34 Robert Gentry FS	Injured Reserve: 84 Jim Brown TE; rookies in italics 43 active, 6 developmental

== Single-season records ==
- Rushing attempts; 297 (1984), Joe Cribbs
- Rushing yards: 1467 (1984), Joe Cribbs
- Rushing TDs: 13 (1984), Leon Perry
- Receptions: 89 (1984), Jim Smith
- Receiving yards: 1607 (1984), Jim Smith (USFL record)
- Receiving TDs; 20 (1985), Jim Smith (USFL record)
- Pass Completions: 266 (1985), Cliff Stoudt
- Pass Attempts; 444 (1985), Cliff Stoudt
- Passing yards: 3188 (1985), Cliff Stoudt
- Passing TDs: 35 (1985), Cliff Stoudt
- Kickoff returns: 26 (1985), Paul Ott Carruth
- Kickoff return yards: 477 (1985), Paul Ott Carruth
- Kickoff return Avg: 23.2 (1984), Lonnie Johnson
- Punt returns: 33 (1985), Thad McFadden
- Punt return yards: 328 (1985), Thad McFadden
- Punt return Avg: 9.9 (1985), Thad McFadden
- Field Goals Made: 25 (1983), Scott Norwood
- Field Goal Attempts: 34 (1983), Scott Norwood
- Punts: 67 (1985), Bob Parsons
- Punt Yardage: 2626 (1985), Bob Parsons
- Punt Average: 41.4 (1983), Skip Johnston
- Tackles: 149 (1985), Herb Spencer
- Sacks: 10.0 (1984), Dave Pureifory
- Passes Defensed: 18 (1985), Chuck Clanton
- Fumbles Recoveries: 3 (1984), Mike Murphy
- Interceptions: 16 (1985), Chuck Clanton (USFL and Pro Football record)
- Interception yards: 275 (1985), Chuck Clanton (USFL record)

== Season-by-season ==
Season records
Season	W	L	T	Finish	Playoff results
1983	9	9	0	4th Central	--
1984	14	4	0	1st EC Southern	Won Quarterfinal (Tampa Bay); Lost Semifinal (Philadelphia)
1985	13	5	0	1st EC	Won Quarterfinal (Houston); Lost Semifinal (Baltimore)
Totals	38	20	0	(including playoffs)	

== After football ==
A few of those associated with the Stallions made their mark in Birmingham after the league folded:

- Joey Jones, who played wide receiver, coached football at two local high schools. In 2006, he became the first head football coach at Birmingham Southern College since 1939, when football was cancelled as a varsity sport. In 2008, after just one year at BSC, he returned to his hometown of Mobile and started the college football program at the University of South Alabama.
- Joe Cribbs returned to the NFL to finish out his football career. He returned to Birmingham to help those recovering from drug and alcohol addiction.
- Jim Hilyer, an assistant coach, went on to be the first ever football coach at the University of Alabama at Birmingham. He would also be an assistant to three other pro football teams to play in Birmingham. After football, he was an instructor in physical fitness at the Birmingham Police Academy.
- Buddy Aydelette is a city councilman with Trussville. Aydelette played offensive lineman for the Stallions and the University of Alabama.

== Other history ==
The Stallions were the first pro football team to draft Jerry Rice. They received the first overall pick in the 1985 USFL Draft, due to a trade with the Orlando Renegades. Rice never played in Birmingham.

Among those considered to be Birmingham's coach were Bobby Bowden, Gene Stallings, and Hank Stram.
