= Jim Bunch =

American football player and businessman (born 1956)

No. 63
- Position: Offensive tackle

Personal information
- Born: March 10, 1956 (age 70); Mechanicsville, Virginia, U.S.

Career information
- College: Alabama

Career history
- 1976–1979: Alabama Crimson Tide
- 1980: West Virginia Rockets

Awards and highlights
- 2× National champion (1978, 1979); Consensus All-American (1979); 3× First-team All-SEC (1977, 1978, 1979)

Jim Bunch (born March 10, 1956) is an American former football player and businessman. He played offensive tackle for the University of Alabama Crimson Tide from 1976 through 1979 and was a member of the 1978 and 1979 national championship teams and a consensus selection to the 1979 College Football All-America Team. After his collegiate career, Bunch played one season as a semi-professional with the West Virginia Rockets. After his playing career ended, Bunch entered the hospitality business. Bunch served as an innkeeper at Winston Place, a bed and breakfast listed on the National Register of Historic Places in Valley Head, Alabama until July 2022.

== Early life ==
As a native of Mechanicsville, Virginia, Bunch played offensive guard for Lee Davis High School football team as a youth. From there, Bunch then enrolled at Fork Union Military Academy where he was recruited initially by Virginia Tech and NC State. Alabama later offered him an opportunity to play with the Crimson Tide only after Alabama assistant coach Ken Donahue noticed Bunch on film that he was viewing for a defensive back that he was recruiting at that time.

== Playing career ==
Bunch entered the Alabama starting lineup in the third game of the 1976 season against Vanderbilt. He was the only freshman to start during the season and was recognized as First Team Freshman All-SEC for his efforts. Bunch remained as a fixture in the Crimson Tide offensive line over the next three seasons alongside Buddy Aydelette, Vince Boothe, Mike Brock and Dwight Stephenson and helped lead Alabama to an overall record of 43 wins and 5 losses (43–5) during his career at the Capstone.

In recognition for his play during his sophomore and junior years, Bunch was a First Team All-SEC selection. After his senior year, Bunch was named First Team All-SEC and as a consensus selection to the 1979 College Football All-America Team and was awarded the Douglas MacArthur Trophy in early 1980 in recognition for his achievements as a Virginia athlete outside the commonwealth. In recognition of his accomplishments as a student athlete, the Virginia state legislature passed a resolution that declared February 2, 1980, as "Jim Bunch Day."

Although he was a consensus selection to the All-America Team, Bunch went undrafted and was not signed as an undrafted free agent after the 1980 NFL draft. He was left unsigned due to NFL teams believing he was too short to be competitive as an offensive lineman as a professional. As such, Bunch then played a single season as a semi-professional with the West Virginia Rockets.

== Later life ==
After the completion of his playing career, Bunch returned to Alabama where he served as a graduate assistant on Bear Bryant's staff for the 1980 season. After he completed his graduate degree, Bunch then worked for Quincy's Family Steakhouses for 25 years until his retirement in 2005. Bunch was an innkeeper at the Winston Place, a bed and breakfast in Valley Head, Alabama along with his wife Leslie until July 2022 when the property was sold.
