= Charlie Trotman =

Charlie Trotman may refer to:

- Spike Trotman (Charlie Spike Trotman, born 1978), American cartoonist and publisher
- Charlie Trotman (American football) (born 1958), American football quarterback and safety
