= Thad McFadden =

Thad McFadden may refer to:

- Thad McFadden (American football) (born 1962), American football player
- Thad McFadden (basketball) (born 1987), American basketball player
