= Joe Bock (American football) =

American football player (born 1959)

No. 56, 65, 66, 77
- Positions: Center, defensive lineman, long snapper

Personal information
- Born: July 21, 1959 (age 67); Rochester, New York, U.S.
- Listed height: 6 ft 4 in (1.93 m)
- Listed weight: 250 lb (113 kg)

Career information
- College: Virginia
- NFL draft: 1981: undrafted

Career history
- Buffalo Bills (1981)*; New York Jets (1982)*; Birmingham Stallions (1983); Houston Gamblers (1984); Birmingham Stallions (1985); St. Louis Cardinals (1987); Buffalo Bills (1987); Chicago Bruisers (1988); Rochester Raiders (2006); New York/New Jersey Revolution (2006)
- * Offseason or practice squad member only

Career NFL statistics
- NFL games: 2
- Stats at Pro Football Reference

Career AFL statistics
- Tackles: 56
- Sacks: 9
- Stats at ArenaFan.com

Joseph Alan Bock (born July 21, 1959) is an American former professional football player in the National Football League (NFL) and United States Football League (USFL).

He attended East Rochester High School and played college football for the Virginia Cavaliers from 1977 to 1981. He was a defensive lineman and long snapper.

== Professional football career ==
Joseph Alan Bock's professional career was from 1981 to 1988. In 2006, Bock played for the Rochester Raiders and the New York/New Jersey Revolution of the Great Lakes Indoor Football League at the age of 46. Bock played for the Buffalo Bills in 1981 and 1987, the Birmingham Stallions of the USFL in 1983 and 1985, the Houston Gamblers in 1984, and the St. Louis Cardinals in 1987. In 1988, Bock played in the Arena Football League for the Chicago Bruisers and appeared in ArenaBowl II.

== Sources ==
- databaseFootball.com – Joe Bock
- Joe Bock Statistics – Pro-Football-reference.com
- AFL Players
- Houston Gamblers
- arenafan.com
