= Mike Perko =

American football player (born 1957)

No. 71, 69
- Position: Defensive tackle

Personal information
- Born: March 30, 1957 (age 69); Seattle, Washington, U.S.
- Listed height: 6 ft 4 in (1.93 m)
- Listed weight: 235 lb (107 kg)

Career information
- High school: Moraga (CA) Campolindo
- College: Utah State
- NFL draft: 1982: 6th round, 155th overall pick

Career history
- Pittsburgh Steelers (1982)*; Atlanta Falcons (1982); Birmingham Stallions (1984–1985)
- * Offseason or practice squad member only

Career NFL statistics
- Sacks: 1
- Fumble recoveries: 2
- Stats at Pro Football Reference

Mike Perko (born March 30, 1957) is an American former professional football player who was a defensive tackle in the National Football League (NFL) and United States Football League (USFL). He played college football for the Utah State Aggies. Perko played for the NFL's Atlanta Falcons in 1982 and in the USFL for the Birmingham Stallions from 1984 to 1985.
