= Sam Venuto =

American football player (1927–2014)

No. 49
- Position: Running back

Personal information
- Born: November 2, 1927; Havertown, Pennsylvania
- Died: July 12, 2014 (aged 86)

Career information
- College: Guilford

Career history
- 1952: Washington Redskins
- Stats at Pro Football Reference

Samuel Laurence Venuto (November 2, 1927 – July 7, 2014) was an American football running back in the National Football League. He played professionally for the Washington Redskins.

== Biography ==
Venuto was born in Havertown, Pennsylvania, and attended Haverford High School in Haverford Township, Pennsylvania. He played college football at Guilford College. In 1952, he played for the Washington Redskins.

He was a coach for more than 25 years at Salem High School, where he posted record of 132-94-11 and coached players including Lydell Mitchell and Jay Venuto, his son.
