= Jay Repko =

American football player (born 1958)

No. 88, 89
- Position: Tight end

Personal information
- Born: June 12, 1958 (age 68); Pottstown, Pennsylvania, U.S.
- Listed height: 6 ft 3 in (1.91 m)
- Listed weight: 240 lb (109 kg)

Career information
- High school: Boyertown Area
- College: Ursinus
- NFL draft: 1981: undrafted

Career history
- Philadelphia Eagles (1981)*; Detroit Lions (1982)*; Michigan Panthers (1983)*; Birmingham Stallions (1984-1985); Philadelphia Eagles (1987)
- * Offseason or practice squad member only

Career NFL statistics
- Receptions: 5
- Receiving yards: 46
- Stats at Pro Football Reference

Jay Kevin Repko (born June 12, 1958) is an American former professional football player who was a tight end for the Philadelphia Eagles of the National Football League (NFL). He played college football for the Penn Quakers and Ursinus Bears.
