= Bob Lane (American football) =

American gridiron football player (born 1959)

Profile
- Position: Quarterback

Personal information
- Born: April 12, 1959 (age 67); Lake Charles, Louisiana, U.S.
- Listed height: 6 ft 3 in (1.91 m)
- Listed weight: 219 lb (99 kg)

Career information
- High school: Neville (Monroe, Louisiana)
- College: Northeast Louisiana
- NFL draft: 1982: 9th round, 242nd overall pick

Career history

Playing
- Tampa Bay Buccaneers (1982)*; Birmingham Stallions (1983); Atlanta Falcons (1984)*; Birmingham Stallions (1984–1985)
- * Offseason or practice squad member only

Coaching
- Northeast Louisiana (1987-1989) Quarterbacks coach; Neville High School (2026-present) Quarterbacks coach

Bob Lane (born April 12, 1959) is a former gridiron football quarterback who played in the United States Football League (USFL). He played college football at Northeast Louisiana.

== College career ==
Lane started his collegiate career at Louisiana State. He suffered a knee injury and broke his foot as a freshman and redshirted his sophomore season. He returned as a redshirt sophomore and played mostly defensive back and was the third-string quarterback as a redshirt junior before transferring to Northeast Louisiana for his fourth season of NCAA eligibility. In his only season with the Indians, Lane started one game but was mostly used as a "relief pitcher" during games, completing 93 of 198 pass attempts for 11 touchdowns and 4 interceptions.

== Professional career ==
Lane was selected in the ninth round of the 1982 NFL draft by the Tampa Bay Buccaneers. After being released by the Buccaneers during the preseason he was signed by the Birmingham Stallions of the United States Football League (USFL). Lane platooned with starter Reggie Collier and eventually took over starting quarterback duties after Collier suffered a season ending hip injury. He finished the 1983 season with 2,264 yards on 175-of-346 passing with 14 touchdown passes and 18 interceptions and also rushed for three touchdowns. After the season Lane was signed by the Atlanta Falcons, but was cut during training camp. Lane was re-signed by the Stallions and was the primary backup quarterback for the team for two seasons until the league folded.

== Post-football ==
After retiring from football, Lane joined Northeast Louisiana's coaching staff, serving as the team's quarterback's coach from 1987 (when the Indians won the Division I-AA national championship) to 1989. Lane's son, Robert, played quarterback and tight end at Ole Miss.
