= Malcolm Taylor (American football) =

American football player (born 1960)

No. 70, 77, 96, 67
- Position: Defensive end

Personal information
- Born: July 21, 1961 (age 65); Crystal Springs, Mississippi, U.S.
- Listed height: 6 ft 6 in (1.98 m)
- Listed weight: 288 lb (131 kg)

Career information
- High school: Crystal Springs
- College: Tennessee State
- NFL draft: 1982: 5th round, 121st overall pick

Career history
- Houston Oilers (1982–1983); Chicago Blitz (1984); Birmingham Stallions (1985); Houston Oilers (1986); Los Angeles Raiders (1987–1988); Atlanta Falcons (1989)

Career NFL statistics
- Sacks: 10.5
- Fumble recoveries: 1
- Stats at Pro Football Reference

Malcolm Taylor (born June 20, 1960) is an American former professional football player who was a defensive end in the National Football League (NFL). He played college football for the Tennessee State Tigers. He played six seasons in the NFL for the Houston Oilers (1982–1986), Los Angeles Raiders (1987–1988), and Atlanta Falcons (1989).
