= Fred Bohannon =

American football player (1958–1999)

No. 23
- Positions: Defensive back, kickoff returner

Personal information
- Born: May 31, 1958; Birmingham, Alabama, U.S.
- Died: February 8, 1999 (aged 40); Birmingham, Alabama, U.S.
- Listed height: 6 ft 0 in (1.83 m)
- Listed weight: 201 lb (91 kg)

Career information
- High school: Woodlawn High School (Birmingham, Alabama)
- College: Mississippi Valley State
- NFL draft: 1982: undrafted

Career history
- Pittsburgh Steelers (1982)

Career NFL statistics
- Games played: 7
- Games started: 0
- Kick returns / Yds: 14 / 329
- Stats at Pro Football Reference

Frederick Jerome Bohannon (May 31, 1958 – February 8, 1999) was an American professional football defensive back who played one season in the National Football League (NFL) with the Pittsburgh Steelers.

== Early life ==
Bohannon was born in Birmingham, Alabama and attended Woodlawn High School. He matriculated at Mississippi Valley State University.

== Pro football career ==
Bohannon signed with the Toronto Argonauts of the Canadian Football League prior to the 1982 NFL draft. He quickly became disenchanted with his situation in Toronto and asked the team for his release. His request was granted after the team's second exhibition game.

Shortly after leaving Toronto, Bohannon contacted the Pittsburgh Steelers who signed him. He was on the Steelers roster for seven games in the strike-shortened 1982 season. He was used primarily on special teams as a kickoff returner and in kick coverage. Bohannon was placed on the Steelers injured reserve list prior to the 1983 season due to a thigh injury and he never again played for the team.

Bohannon later caught on with his hometown Birmingham Stallions of the United States Football League in 1984. He was cut by the Stallions in January 1985.

He attended training camp with the Tampa Bay Buccaneers in 1985, but was cut prior to the start of the season.

== Post-football life ==
After leaving football, Bohannon attended the police academy in Birmingham.
