= Fletcher Louallen =

American football player (born 1962)

No. 43, 38
- Position: Safety

Personal information
- Born: September 12, 1962 (age 64); Jefferson, South Carolina, U.S.
- Listed height: 6 ft 0 in (1.83 m)
- Listed weight: 195 lb (88 kg)

Career information
- High school: Central (Pageland, South Carolina)
- College: West Alabama

Career history
- Winnipeg Blue Bombers (1984)*; Birmingham Stallions (1985); St. Louis Cardinals (1987)*; Minnesota Vikings (1987–1988)
- * Offseason or practice squad member only

Career statistics
- Games played: 3
- Games started: 3
- Stats at Pro Football Reference

Fletcher Allison Louallen (born September 12, 1962) is an American former professional football player who was a safety for one season in the National Football League (NFL) with the Minnesota Vikings and one season in the United States Football League (USFL) for the Birmingham Stallions. He played college football for the West Alabama Tigers.

== Early life and education ==
Louallen was born on September 12, 1962, in Jefferson, South Carolina. He attended Central High School in Pageland, South Carolina, graduating in c. 1980. He committed to the University of West Alabama, where he spent all four seasons on their football roster. When he was a senior in 1983, the West Alabama defense was nicknamed the "Legion of Doom" and Louallen was called the "head Legionnaire." That year he made 43 tackles, three-for-loss, two interceptions and recovered a fumble.

== Professional career ==
Louallen was selected in the 14th round (282nd overall) of the 1984 USFL draft by the Birmingham Stallions, but instead chose to sign with the Winnipeg Blue Bombers of the Canadian Football League (CFL), saying, "Winnipeg's offer was a lot better than Birmingham's." He was released before the season started. In 1985, Louallen signed with the Birmingham Stallions. He appeared in eight total games with the team.

After sitting out the 1986 season, Louallen was signed by the St. Louis Cardinals of the National Football League (NFL). He was released in August. When the Players Association went on strike early in the season, he was signed by the Minnesota Vikings as a replacement player. Louallen started three games, making one interception return of 16 yards before being released when the strike ended. Louallen was re-signed by Minnesota for the 1988 season, but was placed on injured reserve in August and released on September 1.
