= Joe Skibinski =

American football player (1928–2015)

No. 65, 63
- Position: Guard

Personal information
- Born: December 23, 1928; Chicago, Illinois, U.S.
- Died: August 18, 2015 (aged 86); Chicago, Illinois, U.S.
- Listed height: 5 ft 11 in (1.80 m)
- Listed weight: 245 lb (111 kg)

Career information
- High school: Chicago Vocational
- College: Purdue
- NFL draft: 1951: 15th round, 183rd overall pick

Career history
- Cleveland Browns (1952); Green Bay Packers (1955–1956)

Awards and highlights
- Second-team All-Big Ten (1951)

Career NFL statistics
- Games played: 36
- Games started: 25
- Fumble recoveries: 2
- Stats at Pro Football Reference

Joseph John Skibinski (December 23, 1928 – August 18, 2015) was an American professional football guard who played in the National Football League (NFL). He was drafted in the fifteenth round of the 1951 NFL draft by the Cleveland Browns and later played with the team during the 1952 NFL season. After two years away from the NFL, he played with the Green Bay Packers for two seasons.

He was voted 2nd Team All-Big Ten following the 1951 season.

Following his NFL career, he became a high school educator and coach in his native Illinois. One of his sons, John was one of his better players; he following his father's footsteps to Purdue and the NFL and the USFL.
