= 1979 All-SEC football team =

American college football all-star team

The 1979 All-SEC football team consists of American football players selected to the All-Southeastern Conference (SEC) chosen by various selectors for the 1979 NCAA Division I-A football season.

== Offensive selections ==
=== Receivers ===
- Preston Brown, Vanderbilt (AP-1, UPI)
- Cris Collinsworth, Florida (AP-1, UPI)
- Mardye McDole, Mississippi State (AP-2)

=== Tight ends ===
- Reggie Harper, Tennessee (AP-1)
- Felix Wilson, Kentucky (AP-2)

=== Tackles ===
- Jim Bunch, Alabama (AP-1, UPI)
- Matt Braswell, Georgia (AP-1, UPI)
- George Stephenson, Auburn (AP-2, UPI)
- Buddy Aydelette, Alabama (AP-2)
- Tim Irwin, Tennessee (AP-2)

=== Guards ===
- Mike Brock, Alabama (AP-1, UPI)
- Tim Kearns, Kentucky (AP-2)
- Alan Hartlein, Mississippi State (AP-2)

=== Centers ===
- Dwight Stephenson, Alabama (AP-1, UPI)
- Ray Donaldson, Georgia (AP-1 [as G])
- John Ed Bradley, LSU (AP-2)

=== Quarterbacks ===
- Steadman Shealy, Alabama (AP-1)
- Jimmy Streater, Tennessee (UPI)
- John Fourcade, Ole Miss (AP-2)

=== Running backs ===
- Joe Cribbs, Auburn (AP-1, UPI)
- James Brooks, Auburn (AP-1, UPI)
- Major Ogilvie, Alabama (AP-2, UPI)
- Frank Mordica, Vanderbilt (AP-2)
- Steve Whitman, Alabama (AP-2)

== Defensive selections ==
=== Ends ===
- E. J. Junior, Alabama (AP-1, UPI)
- Lyman White, LSU (AP-1)
- John Adams, LSU (AP-2, UPI)
- Wayne Hamilton, Alabama (AP-2)

=== Tackles ===
- David Hannah, Alabama (AP-1, UPI)
- Frank Warren, Auburn (AP-1)
- Benjy Thibodeaux, LSU (UPI)
- Byron Braggs, Alabama (AP-2)
- Tyrone Keys, Mississippi State (AP-2)

=== Middle guards ===
- Richard Jaffe, Kentucky (AP-1, UPI)
- George Atiyeh, LSU (AP-2)

=== Linebackers ===
- Tom Boyd, Alabama (AP-1, UPI)
- Freddie Smith, Auburn (AP-1, UPI)
- Craig Puki, Tennessee (AP-2, UPI)
- David Little, Florida (AP-2)

=== Backs ===
- Scott Woerner, Georgia (AP-1, UPI)
- Roland James, Tennessee (AP-1, UPI)
- Don McNeal, Alabama (AP-1)
- Willie Teal, LSU (AP-1)
- Jim Bob Harris, Alabama (UPI)
- James McKinney, Auburn (AP-2)
- Chris Williams, LSU (AP-2)
- Kenny Johnson, Mississippi State (AP-2)
- Larry Carter, Kentucky (AP-2)
- Tommy Wilcox, Alabama (AP-2)

== Special teams ==
=== Kicker ===
- Rex Robinson, Georgia (AP-1, UPI)
- Jorge Portela, Auburn (AP-2)

=== Punter ===
- Jim Miller, Ole Miss (AP-1, UPI)
- Jim Arnold, Vanderbilt (AP-2)

== Key ==
AP = Associated Press

UPI = United Press International

Bold = Consensus first-team selection by both AP and UPI

== See also ==
- 1979 College Football All-America Team
