= Herb Spencer =

American football player (born 1959)

No. 55, 51
- Position: Linebacker

Personal information
- Born: September 23, 1959 (age 67); Fort Worth, Texas, U.S.
- Listed height: 6 ft 3 in (1.91 m)
- Listed weight: 230 lb (104 kg)

Career information
- High school: Hanahan
- College: Newberry
- NFL draft: 1981: undrafted

Career history
- Washington Redskins (1981)*; New York Giants (1982)*; Birmingham Stallions (1983-1985); Atlanta Falcons (1987)
- * Offseason or practice squad member only
- Stats at Pro Football Reference

Herbert Seabrook Spencer (born September 23, 1959) is an American former professional football player who was a linebacker in the National Football League (NFL) and United States Football League (USFL). He played college football for the Newberry Wolves. He played in the USFL for the Birmingham Stallions before playing for the NFL's Atlanta Falcons in 1987.
