= Ricky Ray (defensive back) =

American football player (born 1957)

No. 22, 43
- Position: Cornerback

Personal information
- Born: May 30, 1957 (age 69); Waynesboro, Virginia, U.S.
- Listed height: 5 ft 11 in (1.80 m)
- Listed weight: 180 lb (82 kg)

Career information
- High school: Waynesboro
- College: Norfolk State (1975–1978)
- NFL draft: 1979: 6th round, 146th overall pick

Career history
- New Orleans Saints (1979–1981); Miami Dolphins (1981); Ottawa Rough Riders (1982–1983); Birmingham Stallions (1984)

Career NFL statistics
- Games played: 31
- Stats at Pro Football Reference

Ricky Lee Ray (born May 30, 1957) is an American former professional football player who was a cornerback for the New Orleans Saints and the Miami Dolphins of the National Football League (NFL). He played college football for the Norfolk State Spartans.
