= Chuck Clanton =

American football player (born 1962)

No. 23
- Position: Defensive back

Personal information
- Born: January 12, 1962 (age 64); Richmond, Virginia, U.S.
- Listed height: 5 ft 11 in (1.80 m)
- Listed weight: 192 lb (87 kg)

Career information
- High school: Pine Forest (Florida)
- College: Auburn
- Supplemental draft: 1984: 2nd round, 39th overall pick

Career history
- Green Bay Packers (1985)

Career NFL statistics
- Games played: 3
- Stats at Pro Football Reference

Cleveland Edward "Chuck" Clanton III (born July 15, 1962) is an American former professional football player who was a defensive back for the Green Bay Packers of the National Football League (NFL). He played college football for the Auburn Tigers.

== Biography ==
Cleveland Edward Clanton III was born in Richmond, Virginia.

== Career ==
After playing with the Birmingham Stallions of the United States Football League, Clanton was selected by the Green Bay Packers in the second round of the 1984 NFL Supplemental Draft of USFL and CFL Players and played with the team that season. He played at the collegiate level at Auburn University.

In 1985, while playing for the USFL's Birmingham Stallions, Clanton set a professional football record by recording 16 interceptions in a single season, eclipsing the previous mark of 14 set in 1952 by Dick 'Night Train' Lane of the Los Angeles Rams.
