= Paul Ott Carruth =

American football player (born 1961)

No. 30, 42
- Position: Running back

Personal information
- Born: July 12, 1961 (age 65); Hattiesburg, Mississippi, U.S.
- Listed height: 6 ft 1 in (1.85 m)
- Listed weight: 220 lb (100 kg)

Career information
- High school: Parklane (MS)
- College: Alabama
- NFL draft: 1985: undrafted

Career history
- Birmingham Stallions (1985); Green Bay Packers (1986–1988); Kansas City Chiefs (1989)

Career NFL statistics
- Rushing yards: 614
- Rushing average: 3.2
- Touchdowns: 5
- Stats at Pro Football Reference

Paul Ott Carruth, Jr. (born July 22, 1961) is a former running back in the National Football League (NFL) and the United States Football League (USFL).

== Biography ==
Carruth, Jr. was born on July 12, 1961, in Hattiesburg, Mississippi. His father, Paul Ott Carruth, Sr. (September 25, 1934 – July 1, 2018), known professionally as Paul Ott, was a country music singer-songwriter, conservationist, and radio and television host.

== Career ==
Carruth played at the collegiate level at Alabama. where he played halfback in 1981 and 1982 on Coach Paul Bear Bryant's last two Alabama teams. After being redshirted in 1983, he was a star on Coach Ray Perkins' 1984 Alabama squad. In his three-year career, Carruth rushed for 1,336 yards on 277 carries and scored 14 touchdowns. He earned Most Valuable Player honors at the 1985 Senior Bowl, before heading off to the NFL.

Carruth played three seasons with the Green Bay Packers. He would spend his final NFL season with the Kansas City Chiefs. He also played for the Birmingham Stallions of the USFL in 1985.
