= Jay Venuto =

American football player (born 1958)

Profile
- Position: Quarterback

Personal information
- Born: February 5, 1958 (age 68); Salem, New Jersey, U.S.
- Listed height: 6 ft 1 in (1.85 m)
- Listed weight: 197 lb (89 kg)

Career information
- High school: Salem (NJ)
- College: Wake Forest
- NFL draft: 1981: undrafted

Career history
- Baltimore Colts (1981); New York Jets (1982); Birmingham Stallions (1983)

Awards and highlights
- ACC Player of the Year (1979)

Jason Schellenger "Jay" Venuto (born February 5, 1958) is a former American football quarterback who played in the National Football League for the Baltimore Colts and the New York Jets, and in the United States Football League for the Birmingham Stallions.

Born in Salem, New Jersey, on February 5, 1958, he is the son of Sam Venuto, who played in the NFL for the Washington Redskins.

He played prep football at Salem High School and played collegiately for the Wake Forest Demon Deacons football team. Leading the team to a 9–3 record and a bowl berth, Venuto was named as the 1979 Atlantic Coast Conference football player of the year, earning the choice from 60% of the 121 votes cast. He was inducted into the Wake Forest Sports Hall of Fame and was recognized as a 2013 Atlantic Coast Conference Legend.
