= Tom Boyd (gridiron football) =

American football player (born 1959)

Thomas Boyd
No. 52, 53, 54
- Position: Linebacker

Personal information
- Born: November 24, 1959 (age 66); Huntsville, Alabama, U.S.
- Listed height: 6 ft 3 in (1.91 m)
- Listed weight: 210 lb (95 kg)

Career information
- High school: Lee (Huntsville, Alabama)
- College: Alabama
- NFL draft: 1982: 8th round, 210th overall pick

Career history
- Green Bay Packers (1982)*; Saskatchewan Roughriders (1982–1983); Birmingham Stallions (1984–1985); Detroit Lions (1987); Detroit Drive (1988)
- * Offseason or practice squad member only

Awards and highlights
- ArenaBowl champion (1988); National champion (1979); Second-team All-American (1980); Third-team All-American (1979); 3× First-team All-SEC (1979, 1980, 1981)

Career NFL statistics
- Sacks: 1
- Stats at Pro Football Reference

Thomas Barton Boyd (born November 24, 1959) is an American former professional football player who was a linebacker in the National Football League (NFL). He played college football for the Alabama Crimson Tide and was selected by the Green Bay Packers in the eighth round of the 1982 NFL draft. He later played with the Detroit Lions during the 1987 NFL season.

== College years ==
Boyd attended the University of Alabama from 1978 to 1981. He was an All-American in 1980 and 1981. During his time at Alabama, the Crimson Tide won back to back National titles in 1978 and 1979.
