= Craig Puki =

American football player (1957–2023)

No. 54, 50
- Position: Linebacker

Personal information
- Born: January 18, 1957; Deadwood, South Dakota, U.S.
- Died: May 14, 2023 (aged 66); Washington, U.S.
- Listed height: 6 ft 1 in (1.85 m)
- Listed weight: 231 lb (105 kg)

Career information
- High school: Glacier (Seattle, Washington)
- College: Tennessee (1975–1979)
- NFL draft: 1980: 3rd round, 77th overall pick

Career history
- San Francisco 49ers (1980–1981); St. Louis Cardinals (1982)

Awards and highlights
- Super Bowl champion (XVI); First-team All-SEC (1979)

Career NFL statistics
- Games played: 39
- Games started: 6
- Interceptions: 1
- Stats at Pro Football Reference

Craig Alan Puki (January 18, 1957 – May 14, 2023) was an American professional football player who was a linebacker for two seasons in the National Football League (NFL) with the San Francisco 49ers and St. Louis Cardinals. He was selected by the 49ers in the third round of the 1980 NFL draft after playing college football for the Tennessee Volunteers. He was a member of the 49ers team that won Super Bowl XVI.

== Early life ==
Craig Alan Puki was born on January 18, 1957, in Deadwood, South Dakota. He attended Glacier High School in Seattle.

== College career ==
Puki was a letterman for the Tennessee Volunteers of the University of Tennessee in 1975, 1976, 1978, and 1979. He began his college career as a running back, rushing 26 times for 135 yards as a freshman in 1975. He later switched to linebacker, totaling one interception in 1978 and one interception in 1979. As a senior in 1979, Puki was named second-team All-SEC by the Associated Press and first-team All-SEC by United Press International.

== Professional career ==
Puki was selected by the San Francisco 49ers in the third round, with the 77th overall pick, of the 1980 NFL draft. He played in 16 games for the 49ers during his rookie year in 1980 and made one interception. He appeared in all 16 games for the second straight season, starting six, in 1981, recording two fumble recoveries. Puki also played in all three playoff games, starting two, that season and posted two solo tackles. On January 24, 1982, the 49ers won Super Bowl XVI against the Cincinnati Bengals. He was released on June 25, re-signed on July 6, and released again on July 31, 1982.

Puki was claimed off waivers by the St. Louis Cardinals on August 2, 1982. He was placed on injured reserve on September 7 and was later activated on November 20, 1982. He then played in seven games for the Cardinals during the 1982 season. Puki also appeared in one playoff game that year. He was released in 1983.

== Personal life ==
Puki died on May 14, 2023, at the age of 66.
