= Ken Toler =

American football player (born 1959)

No. 82, 85
- Position: Wide receiver

Personal information
- Born: April 9, 1959 (age 67); Greenville, Mississippi, U.S.
- Listed height: 6 ft 2 in (1.88 m)
- Listed weight: 195 lb (88 kg)

Career information
- High school: Jackson (Flowood, Mississippi)
- College: Ole Miss
- NFL draft: 1981: 7th round, 185th overall pick

Career history
- New England Patriots (1981–1982); Birmingham Stallions (1984-1985)

Awards and highlights
- Second-team All-SEC (1980)

Career NFL statistics
- Receptions: 7
- Receiving yards: 133
- Touchdowns: 2
- Stats at Pro Football Reference

Kenneth Pack Toler (born April 9, 1959) is an American former professional football player who was a wide receiver for the New England Patriots of the National Football League (NFL). He played college football for the Ole Miss Rebels. He also played in the United States Football League (USFL) for the Birmingham Stallions.
