= John Skibinski =

American football player (born 1955)

No. 30
- Position: Running back

Personal information
- Born: April 27, 1955 (age 71); Chicago, Illinois, U.S.
- Listed height: 6 ft 0 in (1.83 m)
- Listed weight: 222 lb (101 kg)

Career information
- High school: LaSalle-Peru (IL)
- College: Purdue
- NFL draft: 1978: 6th round, 139th overall pick

Career history
- Chicago Bears (1978–1981); Birmingham Stallions (1983); Jacksonville Bulls (1984)

Awards and highlights
- Second-team All-Big Ten (1977); East-West Shrine Game (1977); Hula Bowl (1978); Japan Bowl (1978)

Career NFL statistics
- Rushing yards: 64
- Rushing average: 4
- Receptions: 6
- Receiving yards: 22
- Stats at Pro Football Reference

John Skibinski (born April 27, 1955) is a former running back who played in the National Football League (NFL). He was drafted in the sixth round of the 1978 NFL draft by the Chicago Bears. His NFL career was spent with the Chicago Bears. and ran from 1978 to 1981. He spent the 1982 season out of professional football before returning to the game via the USFL; he played in the 1983 & 1984 seasons as a member of the Birmingham Stallions and Jacksonville Bulls, respectively.

He carried the ball sparingly during the 1975 season, as Mike Pruitt was the main threat for the Boilermakers but Hall of Fame coach Alex Agase saw his potential. In 1976, he was part of a power backfield with Scott Dierking. As the 1977 season approached, Agase had been replaced by Jim Young, Dierking had graduated and moved on to the NFL and the highly touted Freshman Mark Herrmann was taking over at QB. Skibinski was voted team captain for the 1977 season and led the Boilermakers in rushing yardage (665 yards) and total offense (886 yards) and a record of 5-6 in Jim Young's inaugural season at Purdue. He was voted 2nd Team All-Conference following the 1977 season. He currently ranks #20 Career Rushing Attempts (339 carries); #18 Career Rushing Yards (1,605 yards) and #16 Career Rushing Average (4.7 yards/carry).

While at Purdue appeared in the 1977 East-West Shrine Game, the 1978 Hula Bowl and the 1978 Japan Bowl.

He is the son of Joe Skibinski, a former Cleveland Brown and Green Bay Packer. His father was also his high school coach at LaSalle-Peru Township High School in Illinois.
