= Pat Saindon =

French gridiron football player (born 1961)

No. 68, 55
- Position: Guard

Personal information
- Born: March 3, 1961 (age 65); Nice, France
- Listed height: 6 ft 3 in (1.91 m)
- Listed weight: 273 lb (124 kg)

Career information
- College: Vanderbilt
- NFL draft: 1983: undrafted

Career history
- Birmingham Stallions (1983) - (1985); New Orleans Saints (1986); Atlanta Falcons (1987)
- Stats at Pro Football Reference

Patrick Arthur Saindon is a former professional American football player who played offensive lineman for three seasons for the New Orleans Saints and Atlanta Falcons.
