= Thad McFadden (American football) =

American football player (born 1962)

No. 80, 89
- Position: Wide receiver

Personal information
- Born: August 14, 1962 (age 64); Flint, Michigan
- Listed height: 6 ft 2 in (1.88 m)
- Listed weight: 200 lb (91 kg)

Career information
- High school: Beecher (MI)
- College: Wisconsin
- NFL draft: 1985: undrafted

Career history
- Birmingham Stallions (1985); Minnesota Vikings (1987)*; Buffalo Bills (1987)
- * Offseason or practice squad member only
- Stats at Pro Football Reference

Thaddus Dewayn McFadden Sr. (born August 14, 1962) played for the Buffalo Bills during the 1987 NFL season. Previously, he had been a member of the Birmingham Stallions of the United States Football League. He was a wide receiver.

== Personal ==
He is the father of professional basketball player Thad McFadden.
