= Bill Searcey =

American football player (1958–2021)

No. 64
- Position: Guard

Personal information
- Born: March 3, 1958; Savannah, Georgia
- Died: March 8, 2021 (aged 63)
- Listed height: 6 ft 1 in (1.85 m)
- Listed weight: 281 lb (127 kg)

Career information
- High school: Benedictine Military School
- College: Alabama

Career history
- Birmingham Stallions (1983); Houston Gamblers (1984); San Diego Chargers (1985)

Awards and highlights
- 2× National champion (1978, 1979)
- Stats at Pro Football Reference

William Alexander Searcey, known professionally as Bill Searcey, (March 3, 1958 – March 8, 2021) was an American offensive guard for the San Diego Chargers. Born in Savannah, Georgia, he attended Benedictine Military School. He attended college at the University of Alabama and played college football with the Alabama Crimson Tide. He started his career with the Birmingham Stallions in 1983 and then played for the Houston Gamblers. He made his NFL debut in the 1985 season, only appearing in one game during his career. He died on March 8, 2021, due to pancreatic cancer, days after his 63rd birthday. He is survived by his widow, Karen Searcey.
