= Mel Land =

American football player (born 1965)

No. 52, 60
- Position: Linebacker

Personal information
- Born: November 30, 1955; Youngstown, Ohio, U.S.
- Died: April 27, 1997 (aged 41); Campbell, Ohio, U.S.
- Listed height: 6 ft 3 in (1.91 m)
- Listed weight: 243 lb (110 kg)

Career information
- High school: Memorial (St. Mary's, Ohio)
- College: Michigan State
- NFL draft: 1979: 3rd round, 63rd overall pick

Career history
- Miami Dolphins (1979); San Francisco 49ers (1980); Toronto Argonauts (1982); Michigan Panthers (1983); Birmingham Stallions (1983)

Career NFL statistics
- Fumble recoveries: 1
- Stats at Pro Football Reference

Melvin Land (November 30, 1955 – April 27, 1997) was an American professional football linebacker who played four seasons of professional football. After playing collegiately with the Michigan State Spartans, he was selected in the third round of the 1979 NFL draft by the Miami Dolphins and spent his rookie season with them. He then spent 1980 with the San Francisco 49ers before joining the Toronto Argonauts of the Canadian Football League (CFL) after a year out of football in 1982. He split the 1983 season between the Michigan Panthers and Birmingham Stallions of the United States Football League (USFL) before retiring.

Land was killed in a car crash on April 27, 1997.
