= Rollie Dotsch =

American football player and coach (1933–1988)

Biographical details
- Born: February 14, 1933; Garden, Michigan, U.S.
- Died: March 16, 1988 (aged 55); Minnesota, U.S.

Playing career
- 1952–1954: Michigan State
- Positions: Guard, tackle

Coaching career (HC unless noted)
- 1955: Michigan State (assistant freshmen)
- 1956–1957: Escanaba HS (MI)
- 1958–1960: Northern Michigan (line)
- 1961: Colorado (line)
- 1962–1965: Missouri (OL)
- 1966–1970: Northern Michigan
- 1971–1973: Green Bay Packers (OL)
- 1974–1976: New England Patriots (LB)
- 1977: Detroit Lions (LB)
- 1978–1981: Pittsburgh Steelers (OL)
- 1983–1985: Birmingham Stallions
- 1987: Minnesota Vikings (RB)

Head coaching record
- Overall: 33–15–1 (college); 36–18 (USFL); 7–7–2 (high school)
- Tournaments: 0–1 (NAIA playoffs)

Accomplishments and honors

Championships
- National (1952)

Roland Daniel Dotsch (February 14, 1933 – March 16, 1988) was an American football coach who served primarily in an assistant capacity before becoming the first coach of the United States Football League (USFL)'s Birmingham Stallions on September 2, 1982.

The son of politician James D. Dotsch and Lorna M. née. Boudreau, he played college football at Michigan State University, helping the 1952 Spartans win the national championship, then started during his senior year on Michigan State's squad that captured both the Big Ten Conference and Rose Bowl championships.

Dotsch first entered the coaching ranks at Escanaba High School in Michigan, then from 1958 to 1960, served as defensive coordinator at Northern Michigan University. He then went to the University of Colorado as a defensive backs coach in 1962 before moving to another school in the Big Eight Conference at the University of Missouri, where he served as offensive line coach for four years.

He returned to Northern Michigan as head coach before later taking over as athletic director. During his coaching stint, Dotsch's teams compiled a 33–15–1 mark.

When Dan Devine, who had hired him at Missouri, became head coach of the Green Bay Packers, he hired Dotsch as offensive line coach on February 22, 1971. Dotsch remained with the team through four seasons until Devine left to become head coach at the University of Notre Dame at the conclusion of the 1974 NFL season. He moved to coach the New England Patriots linebackers under former college teammate Chuck Fairbanks.

Dotsch was on Tommy Hudspeth's coaching staff with the Detroit Lions until the entire group was dismissed on January 9, 1978. He was hired by the Steelers, and was on the sidelines for their third and fourth Super Bowl titles. Following two more years with the team, Dotsch resigned to accept the head coaching position with the Stallions of the fledgeling USFL.

During the three years of the league's existence, Dotsch was 36–18 and reached the 1984 Eastern Conference title game before losing to the league's eventual champion, the Philadelphia Stars, 20–10. They would be knocked out of the playoffs in the Eastern Conference semi-finals by the Stars again in 1985, 28–14.

After the league voted to suspend play in 1986 in anticipation of a move to the fall, Dotsch was asked if the Stallions would ever play again. "I just don't know. I never say never, though. It would be a long pull."

Dotsch was also critical of league spending. "Every good coach has a game plan. In this case, the USFL got away from the game plan. There's no question we did, or I'll say the USFL did. I don't think we did or Tampa Bay did. Hindsight is much better than foresight, I know, but things were done that hurt us. We (the Stallions) didn't go crazy. We lost the fewest dollars of any USFL team. We were always the poorest team in the playoffs, but we held our own and I'm proud of that. We did a good job with what we had. We won a lot more than we lost, and that's the biggest thing".

Dotsch returned to the NFL in 1987 as running backs coach for the Minnesota Vikings. However, just as training camp began, Dotsch was diagnosed with pancreatic cancer, battling the disease for just over seven months before dying.

== Head coaching record ==
=== College ===
Year	Team	Overall	Conference	Standing	Bowl/playoffs	NAIA^{#}
Northern Michigan Wildcats (NCAA College Division independent) (1966–1970)
1966	Northern Michigan	6–3–1				
1967	Northern Michigan	9–1			L NAIA Semifinal	3
1968	Northern Michigan	5–4				
1969	Northern Michigan	5–5				
1970	Northern Michigan	8–2				
Northern Michigan:		33–15–1				
Total:		33–15–1				
^{#}Rankings from NAIA poll.

=== USFL ===
Team	Year	Regular season					Postseason			
Team	Year	Won	Lost	Ties	Win %	Finish	Won	Lost	Win %	Result
BIRM	1983	9	9	0	.500	4th in Central Div.	-	-	-	None
BIRM	1984	14	4	0	.778	1st EC Southern	1	1	.500	Won Quarterfinal (Tampa Bay); Lost Semifinal (Philadelphia)
BIRM	1985	13	5	0	.722	1st EC	1	1	.500	Won Quarterfinal (Houston); Lost Semifinal (Baltimore)
Total		36	18	0	.667		2	2	.500	
