= Winston Place (Valley Head, Alabama) =

Historic house in Alabama, United States

- U.S. National Register of Historic Places
- Alabama Register of Landmarks and Heritage
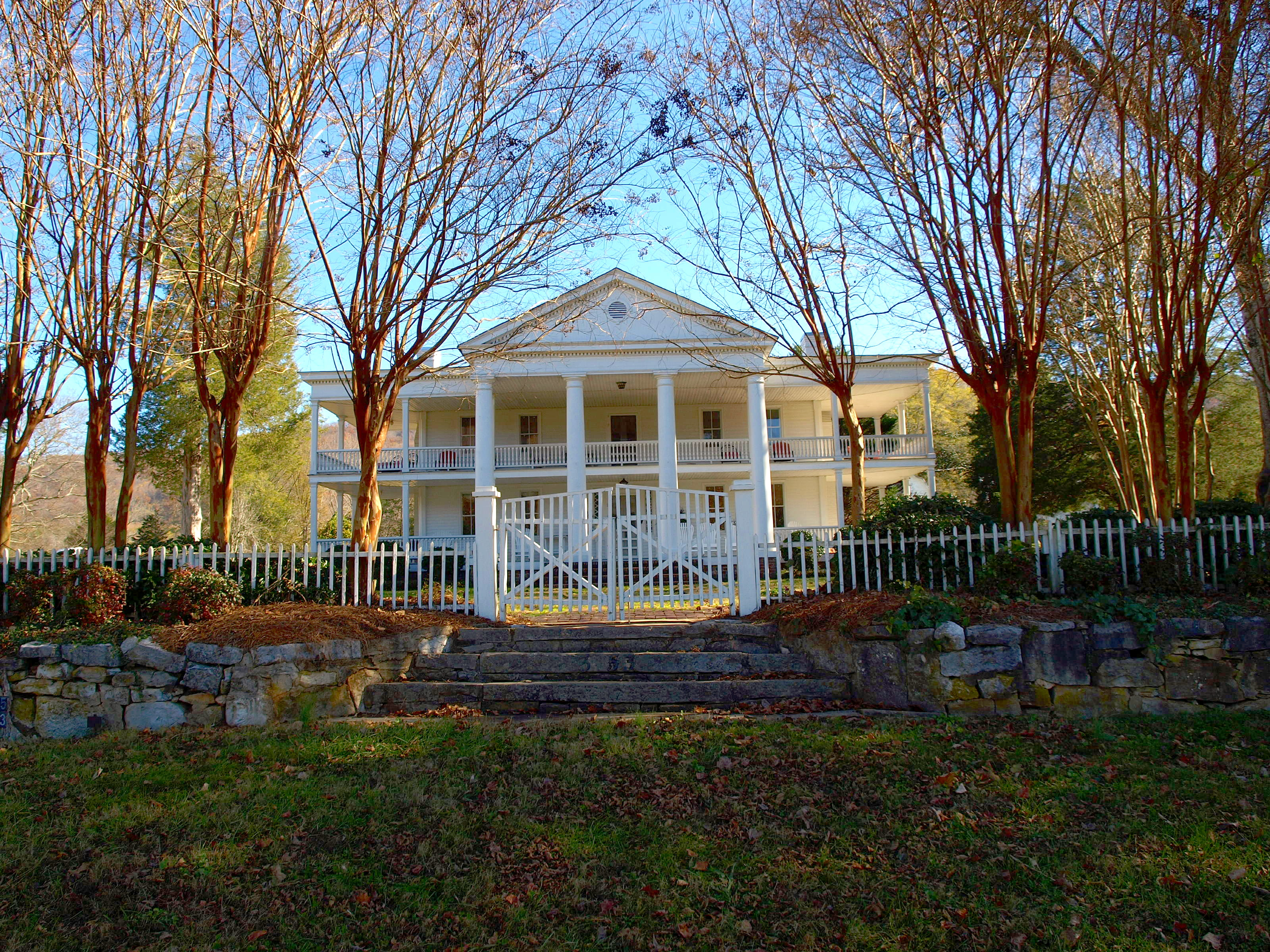
- The house in November 2017

- Location within Alabama Location within the United States
- Location: Off AL 117, Valley Head, Alabama
- Coordinates: 34°34′6″N 85°36′51″W
- Area: 15 acres (6.1 ha)
- Built: c.1838
- Architectural style: Colonial Revival
- NRHP reference No.: 87000476

Significant dates
- Added to NRHP: March 19, 1987
- Designated ARLH: August 3, 1976

Winston Place is a historic residence in Valley Head, Alabama, United States. William O. Winston, a lawyer from Rogersville, Tennessee, moved to DeKalb County in 1838. Winston would later serve in the Alabama House of Representatives and was a major investor in the Wills Valley Railroad, which would later connect Chattanooga with Birmingham. Soon after arriving in Alabama, Winston built a two-story I-house. In the late 19th century, the exterior was extensively modified with a two-story, wrap-around, Colonial Revival porch and tetrastyle portico. Around 1930, rear outbuildings were connected to the house, giving it an L-shaped plan. The house was listed on the Alabama Register of Landmarks and Heritage in 1976 and the National Register of Historic Places in 1987.
