= Robert Woods (offensive tackle) =

American football player (born 1950)

No. 72, 65
- Position: Offensive tackle

Personal information
- Born: July 26, 1950 (age 76); Florence, Alabama, U.S.
- Listed height: 6 ft 3 in (1.91 m)
- Listed weight: 255 lb (116 kg)

Career information
- High school: Lauderdale (AL)
- College: Tennessee State
- NFL draft: 1973: 2nd round, 38th overall pick

Career history
- New York Jets (1973–1977); New Orleans Saints (1977–1980); Birmingham Stallions (1983–1984); Memphis Showboats (1985)

Awards and highlights
- First-team Little All-American (1972)

Career NFL statistics
- Games played: 99
- Games started: 82
- Fumble recoveries: 1
- Stats at Pro Football Reference

Robert Earl Woods (born July 26, 1950) is an American former professional football player who was an offensive tackle for eight seasons in the National Football League (NFL) with the New York Jets and New Orleans Saints. He also played for the Birmingham Stallions and Memphis Showboats of the United States Football League (USFL). Woods played college football for the Tennessee State Tigers. He was selected by the Associated Press as a first-team running back on the 1972 Little All-America college football team.
