= Kevin Miller (American football) =

American football player (born 1955)

No. 87
- Positions: Wide receiver, return specialist

Personal information
- Born: March 21, 1955 (age 71); Weirton, West Virginia, U.S.
- Listed height: 5 ft 10 in (1.78 m)
- Listed weight: 180 lb (82 kg)

Career information
- High school: Weir (Weirton)
- College: Louisville (1974–1977)
- NFL draft: 1978: undrafted

Career history
- Minnesota Vikings (1978–1980); Birmingham Stallions (1983)

Career NFL statistics
- Receptions: 1
- Receiving yards: 35
- Receiving touchdowns: 1
- Stats at Pro Football Reference

Kevin Von Miller (born March 21, 1955) is an American former professional football player who was a wide receiver and return specialist for three seasons with the Minnesota Vikings of the National Football League (NFL). He played college football for the Louisville Cardinals. He was also a member of the Birmingham Stallions of the United States Football League (USFL).

== Early life and college ==
Kevin Von Miller was born on March 21, 1955, in Weirton, West Virginia. He attended Weir High School in Weirton.

Miller was a four-year letterman for the Louisville Cardinals of the University of Louisville from 1974 to 1977. He caught 25 passes for 361 yards and two touchdowns as a freshman in 1974. He recorded 17 receptions for 277 yards and two touchdowns in 1975. During the 1976 season, Miller totaled 10 catches for 165 yards and one touchdown and 11 carries for 69 yards and one touchdown. As a senior in 1977, he accumulated 20 receptions for 230 yards and one touchdown, 13 rushing attempts for 97 yards, 29 punt returns for 223 yards, and 15 kick returns for 366 yards.

== Professional career ==
=== Minnesota Vikings ===
After going undrafted in the 1978 NFL draft, Miller signed with the Minnesota Vikings on May 19. He played in all 16 games for the Vikings during his rookie year in 1978, totaling one reception for 35 yards and a touchdown, 48 punt returns for 239 yards, 40 kick returns for 854 yards, and three fumbles. Miller led the Vikings in punt and kick return yardage in 1978. His 88 kick/punt returns were the most in the NFL that year. He also played in one playoff game that season, returning two punts for negative one yard, fumbling once, and recovering one fumble.

Miller was placed on injured reserve on August 14, 1979. He was later released on November 27 but re-signed two days later. He then appeared in three games during the 1979 season, returning 18 punts for 85 yards, fumbling once, and recovering one fumble.

Miller was released by the Vikings on September 27, 1980, but later re-signed on December 11, 1980. Overall, he played in four games in 1980. He was released by the Vikings for the final time on August 17, 1981.

=== Birmingham Stallions ===
Miller played for the Birmingham Stallions of the United States Football League (USFL) in 1983, returning four punts for six yards and two kicks for 34 yards.

== Minnesota Vikings franchise records ==
- Most punt and kick returns, season: 88
- Most punt returns by a rookie, season: 48
- Most punt returns, game: 8
