= Mike Raines =

American gridiron football player (born 1953)

No. 68, 70, 79, 78
- Position: Defensive tackle

Personal information
- Born: February 14, 1953 (age 73); Montgomery, Alabama, U.S.
- Listed height: 6 ft 5 in (1.96 m)
- Listed weight: 255 lb (116 kg)

Career information
- High school: Lanier (Montgomery)
- College: Alabama
- NFL draft: 1974: 6th round, 138th overall pick

Career history
- San Francisco 49ers (1974); Montreal Alouettes (1975); Ottawa Rough Riders (1975–1982); Winnipeg Blue Bombers (1982); Birmingham Stallions (1983); Jacksonville Bulls (1984); Houston Gamblers (1985)

Awards and highlights
- Grey Cup champion (1976); CFL All-Star (1980); 3× CFL East All-Star (1978, 1980, 1981); All-USFL (1983); National champion (1973); First-team All-SEC (1973)
- Stats at Pro Football Reference

Vaughn Michael Raines (born February 14, 1953) is an American former professional and college football player.

Raines was an Associated Press second-team All American his senior year at Alabama and was also chosen for the All-SEC defensive team. Raines was also the 1973 defensive player of the year at Alabama and played alongside Too Tall Jones in the 1973 Senior Bowl. Following the Senior Bowl Raines was drafted in the 1st. Round of the 1984 WFL draft by the California Suns and in the 6th Round of the 1974 NFL draft by the San Francisco 49ers. Raines chose to play in the NFL for the San Francisco 49ers instead of in the WFL. Following the 74 season he left the NFL for the CFL and played for the Montreal Alouettes. Raines played in the Canadian football league for nine seasons for three teams, Montreal (1975), Ottawa (1975–1982), Winnipeg (1982). He was named CFL Eastern Conference All-Star in 1978 and 1981. Raines was also named 1st Team All-Pro Defensive End in 1981 as well.

Following the 1982 CFL Season Raines chose to leave the CFL and join the Birmingham Stallions in the USFL. Following the 1983 Season in the USFL Raines received several honors. Raines was the only unanimous All-Pro Defensive Player voted to the 1983 First-team All-Pro USFL defensive team. Following the 1983 season Raines was traded to The Jacksonville Bulls. During the 1984 Season Raines was severely injured during practice, diagnosis was severe head trauma, stretched Brachial Plexus. Even though injured the Jacksonville Bulls attempted to trade Raines to The Houston Gamblers of the USFL. Upon arriving in Houston Raines was given a physical and was told he had nerve damage, possibly a slipped disk and may need surgery. He was promptly returned to Jacksonville where he finished out the season on injured reserve and retired the following year.

== See also ==
- United States Football League
- 1978 Canadian Football League season
- 1981 Canadian Football League season
