= Dallas Hickman =

American football player (born 1952)

No. 82, 57, 78
- Positions: Defensive end, linebacker

Personal information
- Born: February 16, 1952 (age 74); Martinez, California, U.S.
- Listed height: 6 ft 6 in (1.98 m)
- Listed weight: 238 lb (108 kg)

Career information
- College: California
- NFL draft: 1975: 9th round, 228th overall pick

Career history
- Washington Redskins (1976–1980); Baltimore Colts (1981); Washington Redskins (1981)

Career NFL statistics
- Sacks: 2.5
- Fumble recoveries: 1
- Stats at Pro Football Reference

Dallas Mark Hickman (born February 16, 1952) is an American former professional football player who was a defensive end in the National Football League (NFL) for the Washington Redskins and Baltimore Colts. He played seven years for the Redskins, from 1975 to 1981. He was a special teams captain during the latter part of the Coach Allen years He played college football for the California Golden Bears and was selected in the ninth round of the 1975 NFL draft.

== USFL ==
=== Washington Federals ===
On October 22, 1982, the Oakland Invaders traded the rights to Hickman to the Washington Federals. He signed with the Federals on January 28, 1983, but then was released on February 27, 1983.

=== Birmingham Stallions ===
On February 28, 1983, he was awarded on waivers to the Birmingham Stallions and would play in 18 games during their 1983 season. The Stallions traded him to the Arizona Wranglers in exchange for guard Rick Kehr on March 7, 1984.

=== Arizona Wranglers ===
Hickman played in 14 games for the 1984 Wranglers.
