= Scott Norwood =

American football player (born 1960)

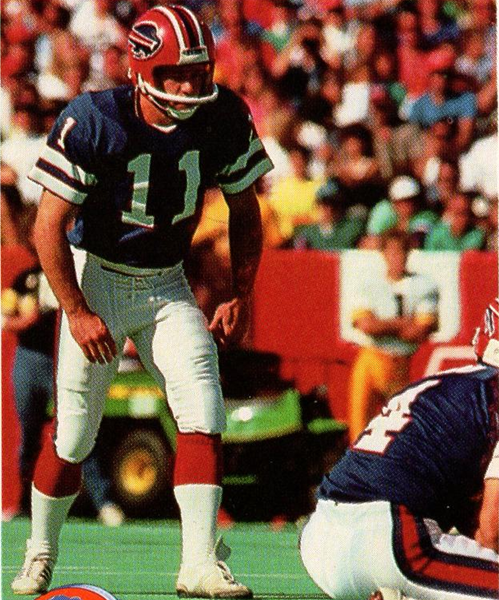
- Norwood with the Buffalo Bills in 1989

No. 4, 11
- Position: Placekicker

Personal information
- Born: July 17, 1960 (age 66); Alexandria, Virginia, U.S.
- Listed height: 6 ft 0 in (1.83 m)
- Listed weight: 207 lb (94 kg)

Career information
- High school: Jefferson (Alexandria)
- College: James Madison (1978–1981)
- NFL draft: 1982: undrafted

Career history
- Atlanta Falcons (1982)*; Birmingham Stallions (1983–1984); Buffalo Bills (1985–1991)
- * Offseason or practice squad member only

Awards and highlights
- First-team All-Pro (1988); Pro Bowl (1988); NFL scoring leader (1988); PFW Golden Toe Award (1988); James Madison Dukes No. 4 retired

Career NFL statistics
- Field goal attempts: 184
- Field goals made: 133
- Field goal %: 72.28
- Stats at Pro Football Reference

Scott Allan Norwood (born July 17, 1960) is an American former professional football player who was a placekicker for seven seasons with the Buffalo Bills of the National Football League (NFL). He also played for the Birmingham Stallions in the United States Football League (USFL) for two seasons. As Buffalo's placekicker, Norwood led the league in scoring for the 1988 season and played in their first two Super Bowl appearances. Despite his accomplishments, he is best known for missing a game-winning field goal attempt at the end of Super Bowl XXV.

== Early life and college ==
Norwood was born in Alexandria, Virginia and graduated from Thomas Jefferson High School in Alexandria in 1978. He played both football and soccer at James Madison University and graduated with a business degree in 1982.

== Professional career ==
=== Birmingham Stallions ===
Norwood began his professional career with the Birmingham Stallions of the United States Football League, playing two seasons before the Stallions signed Danny Miller to replace him.

=== Buffalo Bills ===
Norwood was one of many players the Bills picked up as the USFL contracted and ultimately collapsed; he eventually beat out Todd Schlopy (who would later come back when Norwood went on strike in 1987) for the Bills' starting kicker position. He quickly became an asset to an offense that was going places as the Bills' general manager, Bill Polian, assembled talent like Jim Kelly, Thurman Thomas, and Bruce Smith. Within two seasons of Norwood's arrival, the Bills had won the AFC East for the first time since 1980 and made it to the conference championship game. He soon overtook O. J. Simpson as the team's all-time leading scorer. Following the 1990 season, the Bills advanced to their first-ever Super Bowl.

==== Super Bowl XXV ====
Norwood's field goal range was unusually short for a professional kicker and he had difficulties in converting field goals over 40 yards throughout his career, especially on natural grass (the Bills' home stadium used AstroTurf, which mitigated this issue). Super Bowl XXV, which was played on January 27, 1991, cemented Norwood's name in football history when he missed a 47-yard field goal attempt with 8 seconds left in the game, giving the New York Giants their second Super Bowl victory, and started the Bills' string of four consecutive Super Bowl losses. This kick was made famous by the "wide right" call by ABC announcer Al Michaels. Later video analysis revealed the holder mistakenly aligned the laces to the right, thereby positioning the kicked ball to fade right once in the air. Norwood said his mind went blank as he watched the ball sail, followed by an "empty feeling" upon realizing he missed.

Despite his miss, Norwood was greeted positively by Bills fans when the team returned to Buffalo. He tearfully addressed the fans at the accompanying ceremony, telling them that "we're struggling with this right now. I know I've never felt more loved than this right now." Norwood also received letters of support and praise from coaches and teachers about life lessons amid defeat; he recalled in 2020 that "it's not always fun, but you can't just soak up the sunshine in life. Sometimes, you got to soak up a little rain, too."

Although the Bills signed Björn Nittmo as Norwood's potential replacement in the 1991 offseason, Norwood remained with the Bills through that season. The Bills returned to the Super Bowl and Norwood was perfect throughout the postseason, including a 44-yard field goal that served as the decisive margin in the AFC Championship Game against the Denver Broncos.

Norwood was waived in the first roster move of the 1992 offseason after the Bills signed Steve Christie, formerly of the Tampa Bay Buccaneers.

== Post-football career ==
After the Bills waived him, Norwood initially returned home to Northern Virginia and disappeared completely from the public eye for several years, eventually becoming an insurance salesman during the 1990s then moving back to Buffalo as a real estate agent in 2002.

Norwood has publicly reflected on his career's positives, including his Pro Bowl nod and Super Bowl appearances. While acknowledging that Wide Right remains the most prominent part of his career, he said in 2010 that he had "moved on and [had] it in its proper place and perspective."

== NFL career statistics ==
Legend
	Led the league
**Bold**	Career high

Year	Team	GP	FGM	FGA	FG%	XPM	XPA	XP%	PTS
1985	BUF	16	13	17	76.5	23	23	100.0	62
1986	BUF	16	17	27	63.0	32	34	94.1	83
1987	BUF	12	10	15	66.7	31	31	100.0	61
1988	BUF	16	**32**	**37**	**86.5**	33	33	100.0	**129**
1989	BUF	16	23	30	76.7	46	47	97.9	115
1990	BUF	16	20	29	69.0	50	52	96.2	110
1991	BUF	16	18	29	62.1	**56**	**58**	96.6	110
Total		**108**	**133**	**184**	**72.3**	**271**	**278**	**97.5**	**670**

=== Playoffs ===
Year	Team	GP	FGM	FGA	FG%	XPM	XPA	XP%	PTS
1988	BUF	2	2	5	40.0	3	3	100.0	9
1989	BUF	1	1	1	**100.0**	3	4	75.0	6
1990	BUF	3	5	**7**	71.4	13	14	92.9	**28**
1991	BUF	3	5	5	100.0	8	8	100.0	23
Total		**9**	**13**	**18**	**72.2**	**27**	**29**	**93.1**	**66**

== Personal life ==
Norwood lives with his wife Kimberly in the Washington, D.C. suburb of Centreville, Virginia. They have three children: twins Carly and Connor (born 1995) and Corey (born 1996).

== In popular culture ==
In the 1994 film Ace Ventura: Pet Detective, a key plot point involves a kicker for the 1984 Miami Dolphins named Ray Finkle; in the story, Finkle misses a field goal attempt in the closing moments of Super Bowl XVII, causing the Dolphins to lose the game to the San Francisco 49ers by a single point–an obvious reference to Norwood's infamous kick in Super Bowl XXV. (In reality, while the Dolphins did advance to Super Bowl XVII, the game was held at the end of the 1982 season; the Dolphins and 49ers met at Super Bowl XIX at the end of the 1984 season. The Dolphins were defeated in both contests by multiple scores.)

In the 1998 film Buffalo '66, the main character, Billy Brown, desires to murder a former Buffalo kicker named "Scott Wood," whose missed field goal led to Brown losing a large bet, which Brown blames for ruining his life.
