= Carl McGee =

American football player (born 1956)

No. 58, 51
- Position: Linebacker

Personal information
- Born: July 15, 1956 (age 70); Cincinnati, Ohio, U.S.
- Listed height: 6 ft 3 in (1.91 m)
- Listed weight: 228 lb (103 kg)

Career information
- High school: Woodward (Cincinnati)
- College: Duke
- NFL draft: 1979: 9th round, 234th overall pick

Career history
- Cleveland Browns (1979)*; San Francisco 49ers (1979)*; San Diego Chargers (1980); Houston Oilers (1982)*; Los Angeles Express (1983)*; Birmingham Stallions (1983)
- * Offseason or practice squad member only

Awards and highlights
- First-team All-ACC (1976)

Career NFL statistics
- Games played: 6
- Stats at Pro Football Reference

Carl Demetrius McGee (born July 15, 1956) is an American former professional football player who was a linebacker for one season with the San Diego Chargers in the National Football League (NFL). He also played one season for the Birmingham Stallions of the United States Football League (USFL). He played college football for the Duke Blue Devils.

== Early life and education ==
Carl McGee was born on July 15, 1956, in Cincinnati, Ohio. He attended Woodward High School there before playing college football for the Duke Blue Devils. After leading his team to the championship, he was named by The Cincinnati Enquirer as the high school football player of the year in 1974. He became a starter as soon as he entered the school, becoming one of the top defensive players almost instantly. He made 60 tackles by just week 5. Playing the second half of week 1, McGee made 11 tackles, against the defending champion Southern California. He scored his first career touchdown in his fifth career game, on a 68-yard return against Army. "That was my first touchdown ever. I really didn't think I would go all the way with the interception but when I got to the end zone I was pretty excited," said McGee. Until a shipment of jerseys came, McGee would wear a different number each week, wearing 96, 58, 68, and 36 in his first few games. He recorded 130 tackles and one interception during the following season, being named All-ACC for the second straight year. By the end of his junior year he had compiled 377 tackles. In 1978, McGee said that he senior year goal was to "go out and have a little bit of fun."

== Professional career ==
McGee was selected by the Cleveland Browns as the 234th overall pick of the 1979 NFL draft. A 9th round selection, McGee was released at roster cuts by the Browns. He was then acquired off waivers by the San Francisco 49ers, but released shortly afterwards. In January 1980, he was signed by the San Diego Chargers. He was given number 58 with the Chargers, the number he had worn in week one of his freshman season. He spent the beginning of the season on the practice squad, before being promoted to the active roster in early November. He played his first career game in a 13–20 loss against the Denver Broncos. He would play in five other games, missing just week 12. He also appeared in their two playoff games, ending when they lost 27–34 in the conference championship. He was released the next season, and did not sign with another team until with the Houston Oilers a year later. He was released at roster cuts again, this time ending his National Football League (NFL) career. On February 24, 1983, he signed a contract with the Los Angeles Express of the United States Football League (USFL). He was released and then signed by the Birmingham Stallions. He spent a few games on their roster, and played in a couple games. It would be the last team of his professional career.
