= Frank Reed (American football) =

American football player (born 1954)

No. 28
- Positions: Cornerback, safety

Personal information
- Born: May 13, 1954 (age 72); Seattle, Washington, U.S.
- Listed height: 5 ft 11 in (1.80 m)
- Listed weight: 193 lb (88 kg)

Career information
- High school: Renton (WA) Hazen
- College: Washington
- NFL draft: 1976: 8th round, 219th overall pick

Career history
- Atlanta Falcons (1976–1980); Birmingham Stallions (1983)

Awards and highlights
- Second-team All-Pac-8 (1975)

Career NFL statistics
- Interceptions: 6
- Fumble recoveries: 7
- Sacks: 5
- Stats at Pro Football Reference

Frank Rodney Reed (born May 13, 1954) is an American former professional football player who was a defensive back for five seasons with the Atlanta Falcons of the National Football League (NFL). He played college football for the Washington Huskies.

== Playing career ==
Before the 1981 season, the Falcons traded Reed to the Green Bay Packers with Dewey McClain for Steve Luke and a draft pick. In 1983 he played for the Birmingham Stallions of the United States Football League.
