= Mark Goodspeed =

American football player (1956–1998)

No. 70
- Position: Offensive tackle

Personal information
- Born: December 1, 1956; Kansas City, Kansas, U.S.
- Died: January 10, 1998 (aged 41); Kearney, Nebraska, U.S.
- Listed height: 6 ft 5 in (1.96 m)
- Listed weight: 270 lb (122 kg)

Career information
- High school: Kansas City (MO) Rockhurst
- College: Nebraska
- NFL draft: 1980: 9th round, 239th overall pick

Career history
- Miami Dolphins (1980)*; St. Louis Cardinals (1980); Houston Oilers (1982)*; Birmingham Stallions (1983)
- * Offseason or practice squad member only

Awards and highlights
- Second-team All-Big Eight (1979)

Career NFL statistics
- Games played: 3
- Stats at Pro Football Reference

Mark Judson Goodspeed (December 1, 1956 – January 10, 1998) was an American professional football tackle. He played for the St. Louis Cardinals in 1980 and the Birmingham Stallions in 1983.
