= Ken Talton =

American football player (born 1956)

No. 45
- Position: Running back

Personal information
- Born: June 25, 1956 (age 70); Mansfield, Ohio, U.S.
- Listed height: 6 ft 0 in (1.83 m)
- Listed weight: 208 lb (94 kg)

Career information
- High school: Shady Side Academy
- College: Cornell
- NFL draft: 1979: undrafted

Career history
- New England Patriots (1979)*; Detroit Lions (1980); Birmingham Stallions (1983–1984)
- * Offseason or practice squad member only
- Stats at Pro Football Reference

Kenneth B. Talton (born June 25, 1956) is an American former professional football player who was a running back for the Detroit Lions of the National Football League (NFL). He played college football for the Cornell Big Red. He was a member of the Quill and Dagger society at Cornell University.
