= Jackie Cline =

American football player (1960–2026)

No. 96, 98, 94
- Position: Defensive lineman

Personal information
- Born: March 13, 1960; Kansas City, Kansas, U.S.
- Died: July 24, 2026 (aged 66)

Career information
- College: Alabama

Career history
- 1983–1985: Birmingham Stallions
- 1986: Green Bay Packers*
- 1987: Cleveland Browns*
- 1987: Pittsburgh Steelers
- 1987–1989: Miami Dolphins
- 1990: Atlanta Falcons*
- 1990: Miami Dolphins*
- 1990: Detroit Lions
- * Offseason or practice squad member only

Awards and highlights
- National champion (1979); Second-team All-SEC (1982)
- Stats at Pro Football Reference

Jackie Cline (March 13, 1960 – July 24, 2026) was an American professional football player who was a defensive lineman for eight seasons with the Birmingham Stallions, Ottawa Rough Riders, Pittsburgh Steelers, Miami Dolphins, and Detroit Lions. He played college football for the Alabama Crimson Tide. Cline died on July 24, 2026, at the age of 66.
