= Steve Stephens (American football) =

American football player (born 1957)

No. 86, 88
- Position: Tight end

Personal information
- Born: March 4, 1957 (age 69); Tampa, Florida, U.S.
- Listed height: 6 ft 3 in (1.91 m)
- Listed weight: 227 lb (103 kg)

Career information
- High school: Thomas Jefferson (Tampa)
- College: Oklahoma State
- NFL draft: 1979: 10th round, 254th overall pick

Career history
- Baltimore Colts (1979)*; Tampa Bay Buccaneers (1980)*; New York Jets (1981); Denver Gold (1983)*; Michigan Panthers (1983)*; Birmingham Stallions (1983)
- * Offseason or practice squad member only
- Stats at Pro Football Reference

Stephen B. Stephens (born March 4, 1957) is an American former professional football tight end who played for the New York Jets of the National Football League (NFL). He played college football for the Oklahoma State Cowboys and was selected by the Baltimore Colts in the tenth round of the 1979 NFL draft.

== Early life ==
Stephen B. Stephens was born on March 4, 1957, in Tampa, Florida. He attended Thomas Jefferson High School in Tampa.

== College career ==
Stephens enrolled at Oklahoma State University to play college football for the Cowboys. He was a four-year letterman from 1975 to 1978. He was a fullback his freshman year in 1975, rushing nine times for 54 yards and one touchdown. Stephens moved to tight end in 1976. Stephens was primarily a blocking tight end, finishing his college career with nine receptions for 112 yards and one touchdown.

== Professional career ==
Stephens was selected by the Baltimore Colts in the tenth round, with the 254th overall pick, of the 1979 NFL draft. He was released on August 21, 1979, after the third of four preseason games.

Stephens signed with the Tampa Bay Buccaneers on March 15, 1980. He was released on August 6, 1980, before the first game of the 1980 preseason.

Stephens was signed by the New York Jets on May 5, 1981. He was released on August 31 but re-signed the next day. He played in all 16 games for the Jets during the 1981 season as a reserve tight end and returned two kicks for 21 yards. Stephens also appeared in one playoff game. Stephens was released on September 6, 1982, before the start of the regular season.

Stephens signed with the Denver Gold of the United States Football League (USFL) on January 10, 1983. He was released on February 7, 1983, a month before the regular season.

Stephens was signed by the USFL's Michigan Panthers on February 12, 1983. He was waived on February 27, a week before the start of the regular season.

Stephens was claimed off waivers by the Birmingham Stallions on February 28. He played in 14 games for the Stallions during the 1983 USFL season as a backup tight end, catching six passes for 56 yards and one touchdown. He was released with an injury settlement the next year on February 13, 1984.
