= Reggie Collier =

American football player (born 1961)

No. 10, 7
- Position: Quarterback

Personal information
- Born: May 14, 1961 (age 65); Biloxi, Mississippi, U.S.
- Listed height: 6 ft 3 in (1.91 m)
- Listed weight: 205 lb (93 kg)

Career information
- High school: D'Iberville (MS)
- College: Southern Miss
- NFL draft: 1983: 6th round, 162nd overall pick

Career history
- Birmingham Stallions (1983); Washington Federals (1984); Orlando Renegades (1985); Dallas Cowboys (1986); Ottawa Rough Riders (1987); Pittsburgh Steelers (1987); Orlando Predators (1991); Albany Firebirds (1993)

Awards and highlights
- 2× Third-team All-American (1981, 1982); 2× All-South Independent (1981, 1982); Southern Miss Golden Eagles No. 10 retired

Career NFL statistics
- Passing attempts: 22
- Passing completions: 12
- Completion percentage: 54.5%
- TD–INT: 3–3
- Passing yards: 206
- Passer rating: 86.6
- Stats at Pro Football Reference

Career AFL statistics
- TD–INT: 36–9
- Passing yards: 1,923
- Passer rating: 83.09
- Stats at ArenaFan.com

Reginald C. Collier (born May 14, 1961) is an American former professional football player who was a quarterback in the National Football League (NFL). Best known as a dynamic college football star, he had a short-lived professional career in both the United States Football League (USFL) and National Football League (NFL). He played college football for the Southern Miss Golden Eagles.

== Early life ==
Collier’s grandparents didn't allow him to play football until his junior year in D'Iberville High School, when he became a starter at quarterback, until breaking his collarbone after playing in three games (all of them wins).

As a senior, he guided his team to a perfect 13–0 record, while also playing safety on defense. He received MVP honors in the state's high school all-star game. He also practiced basketball.

== College career ==
Collier accepted a football scholarship from the University of Southern Mississippi under head coach Bobby Collins, who was using the veer offense and promised him that he could play quarterback. As a freshman, he was a backup behind Dane McDaniel.

He became a starter as a sophomore, leading the team to a 6–0 start, with victories over the University of Mississippi and Mississippi State University (in back-to-back weeks) and the first Associated Press Top 25 ranking in the program history (No. 20 on October 21, 1980). The team beat McNeese State University 16–14 at the Independence Bowl, for the school's first bowl game win in history. He tallied 1,268 passing yards, 7 passing touchdowns, 464 rushing yards and 2 rushing touchdowns.

As a junior in 1981, he had a season for the ages, when he became the first quarterback in NCAA Division I history to pass and rush for over 1,000 yards in a single season, posting 81 out of 139 attempts for 1,004 passing yards and had 153 carries for 1,005 rushing yards. He accomplished several noteworthy victories in school history, against Mississippi State University, Florida State University and tying the University of Alabama 13–13 at Legion Field in Birmingham, when he led the offense down the field for a dramatic game-tying field goal. He had a career-high 186 rushing yards against the University of Texas at Arlington. He finished with a 9–2–1 record, was ninth in the Heisman Trophy voting and helped the school achieve its highest Associated Press ranking ever (No. 9).

In 1982, Collins left and Jim Carmody took over the head coaching responsibilities. He changed the offense and the team struggled with a 7–4 record. Still Collier posted 1,265 passing yards, 3 passing touchdowns, 803 rushing yards and 12 rushing touchdowns. He also had a 38–29 historic win against Alabama, ending their 57-game winning streak at Bryant–Denny Stadium.

He finished his college career with 3,662 passing yards, 2,304 rushing yards on 446 carries, 5,977 yards of total offense (school record), 16 passing touchdowns and 26 rushing touchdowns.

In 2000, he was inducted into the USM Athletic Hall of Fame and was selected along with Brett Favre, to the Southern Miss Team of the Century. In 2008, his collegiate No. 10 Jersey was retired by Southern Miss and became one of three players in school history to have been given this honor. In 2008, he also was inducted into the Mississippi Sports Hall of Fame.

== Professional career ==
=== Birmingham Stallions ===
Collier was selected by the Birmingham Stallions of the United States Football League in the first round (third overall) of the 1983 USFL draft. He injured his hip in the season opener and started being platooned with Bob Lane. He suffered a season ending knee injury in the tenth game, after registering 5 starts, 604 passing yards, one touchdown, 253 rushing yards and 4 rushing touchdowns.

On January 12, 1984, the team signed quarterback Cliff Stoudt and traded Collier to the Washington Federals in exchange for a number one draft choice (#1 Jerry Rice) and the rights to center Joel Hilgenberg.

=== Washington Federals / Orlando Renegades ===
In 1984, he was being platooned with Mike Hohensee during the pre-season, until he was relegated to the backup position after the opening game of the season.

In 1985, the team moved to Orlando and was renamed as the Orlando Renegades. The owner chose not to retain Howard Schnellenberger and asked Lee Corso to take over as the head coach. He would name Collier the starter at quarterback in the fifth game of the season, after being limited with a finger injury early in the year. He finished with a 5–13 record, 229 of 427 attempts for 2,578 passing yards, 606 rushing yards, 13 passing touchdowns, 12 rushing touchdowns (including 2 runs of 63 and 71 yards) and 16 interceptions. In the last six games, he passed for 8 touchdowns and 4 interceptions. He had his best passing game as a professional against the Tampa Bay Bandits, making 17 out of 30 passes for 214 yards, 3 touchdowns and one interception. Against the Jacksonville Bulls, he rushed for 171 yards and 4 touchdowns, setting pro football single-game rushing records for a quarterback.

In his USFL career, he recorded 358 out of 695 attempts for 4,151 passing yards, 20 passing touchdowns, 35 interceptions, 155 carries for 1,033 rushing yards, a 6.7 yard per carry average and 17 rushing touchdowns.

=== Dallas Cowboys ===
The Dallas Cowboys of the National Football League, gambling that the USFL was not going to last, acquired Collier's NFL rights by selecting him in the sixth round (162nd overall) of the 1983 NFL draft, even though he had already signed with the Washington Federals. On May 23, 1986, he signed a four-year contract, which was a transaction that was overshadowed by the acquisition of running back Herschel Walker.

Although he was considered as a "raw" player at the time, he was also seen as the prototype of the future NFL quarterback. In pre-season he was productive in his appearances, but could not move out of the third-string quarterback role. He was the first African American quarterback to make the Cowboys roster.

The team accommodated Collier expecting that he could develop and refine his skills, but it was perceived that he never practiced or prepared diligently enough.

On November 23, down 41–7 against the Washington Redskins, Collier was sent in the fourth quarter with 8 minutes to play, helped the offense score 7 points and ran out of time while looking for a possible second touchdown. In the season finale against the defending Super Bowl Champions the Chicago Bears, he became the first African American quarterback to start in franchise history. He had four turnovers (three came in his first three series) and was replaced with Steve Pelluer in the third quarter.

Collier played in four games in 1986, completing 8–15 passes for 96 yards and one touchdown. He was waived on June 17, 1987.

=== Pittsburgh Steelers ===
After the players went on a strike on the third week of the 1987 season, those games were canceled (reducing the 16 game season to 15) and the NFL decided that the games would be played with replacement players. Collier was signed to be a part of the Pittsburgh Steelers replacement team. He played in two games before being released after the strike was over on October 19.

=== Orlando Predators ===
In 1991, Collier was the first ever player signed by the Orlando Predators franchise of the Arena Football League. He passed for 1,312 yards, 21 touchdowns, 5 interceptions (a league low), before being replaced by future AFL Hall of Famer Ben Bennett, after being sacked 24 times (highest in the league). He was waived on April 14, 1992.

=== Albany Firebirds ===
On April 13, 1993, He signed with the Albany Firebirds after being out of football for a year rehabbing a knee injury. On June 29, he was lost for the season with a knee injury.

== Personal life ==
Collier is currently the Coordinator of Athletic Development and Community Relations in the Southern Miss Athletics Department. He is also a member of the Nu Eta chapter of Omega Psi Phi fraternity.

== See also ==
- Racial issues faced by black quarterbacks
