= David Evans (American football) =

American football player (born 1959)

No. 26
- Position: Cornerback

Personal information
- Born: May 1, 1959 (age 67); Naples, Texas, U.S.
- Listed height: 6 ft 0 in (1.83 m)
- Listed weight: 178 lb (81 kg)

Career information
- High school: Pewitt (Omaha, Texas)
- College: Central Arkansas
- NFL draft: 1982: undrafted

Career history
- Birmingham Stallions (1983–1985); Minnesota Vikings (1986–1987); Tampa Bay Buccaneers (1988)*; Detroit Drive (1988–1991); Calgary Stampeders (1989)*
- * Offseason or practice squad member only

Awards and highlights
- 3× ArenaBowl champion (1988, 1989, 1990)
- Stats at Pro Football Reference
- Stats at ArenaFan.com

David Wayne Evans (born May 1, 1959) is an American former professional football cornerback who played for the Minnesota Vikings of the National Football League (NFL). He played college football for the Central Arkansas Bears.

== Early life ==
David Wayne Evans was born on May 1, 1959, in Naples, Texas. He attended Pewitt High School in Omaha, Texas.

== College career ==
Evans enrolled at the University of Central Arkansas (UCA) to play college football for the Bears. He was a four-year letterman from 1978 to 1981 and earned All-Arkansas Intercollegiate Conference honors. He was also a two-time NAIA All-American sprinter on the track team.

== Professional career ==
Evans went undrafted in the 1982 NFL draft and thereafter started working as a student teacher at Conway Junior High School in Conway, Arkansas. While bicycling back to the UCA dorm from his student teaching job, the initially reluctant Evans was persuaded by some friends to attend a tryout on the campus' track that was being held by a pro football scout. The scout told Evans that if he could run a 4.3 second 40-yard dash on the grass, then he would offer Evans a contract to play for the Birmingham Stallions of the United States Football League. Evans reportedly ran a 4.28 second 40-yard dash. Without an agent, he signed with the Stallions on May 21, 1983. He played in five games, starting three, for the Stallions during the 1985 USFL season. Evans started all 18 games in 1984, recording three interceptions for 60 yards and one touchdown while also recovering a fumble for a five-yard touchdown. Birmingham finished the 1984 season with a 14–4 record. Evans played in all 18 games for the second consecutive year in 1985, posting one interception and one fumble recovery. The USFL folded after the 1985 season.

Evans was signed by the Minnesota Vikings of the National Football League (NFL) on August 11, 1986. He appeared in all 16 games, starting one, for the Vikings in 1986. He was released on September 7, 1987, before the start of the 1987 regular season. On September 24, Evans re-signed with Minnesota during the 1987 NFL players strike. He started all three strike games for the Vikings and recovered one fumble. He was released on October 19, 1987, after the strike ended.

Evans signed with the NFL's Tampa Bay Buccaneers on April 5, 1988. He was waived on June 8, 1988.

Evans played in 23 games for the Detroit Drive of the Arena Football League (AFL) from 1988 to 1991, winning the ArenaBowl in 1988, 1989, and 1990. He was a wide receiver/defensive back during his AFL career as the league played under ironman rules. Evans recorded AFL career totals of 43 solo tackles, 16 assisted tackles, seven interceptions for 58 yards, nine pass breakups, one forced fumble, two fumble recoveries, and 11 receptions for 103 yards and one touchdown.

On October 10, 1989, after the AFL season, Evans was signed to the practice roster of the Calgary Stampeders of the Canadian Football League (CFL). He missed part of the 1990 AFL season while attending CFL training camp with the Stampeders. On June 23, 1990, it was reported that Evans had been released. He then returned to the Detroit Drive.

In 1992, Evans was drafted by the expansion Cincinnati Rockers of the AFL but did not play for them.
