= Buddy Aydelette =

American football player (born 1956)

No. 62, 72, 78
- Position: Guard

Personal information
- Born: August 19, 1956 (age 70); Mobile, Alabama, U.S.
- Listed height: 6 ft 4 in (1.93 m)
- Listed weight: 256 lb (116 kg)

Career information
- High school: Murphy (Mobile)
- College: Alabama
- NFL draft: 1980: 7th round, 169th overall pick

Career history
- Green Bay Packers (1980–1981); Birmingham Stallions (1983–1985); Minnesota Vikings (1987)*; Pittsburgh Steelers (1987–1988)
- * Offseason or practice squad member only

Awards and highlights
- 3× All-USFL (1983, 1984, 1985); 2× National champion (1978, 1979); Second-team All-SEC (1979)

Career NFL statistics
- Games played: 21
- Games started: 5
- Fumble recoveries: 1
- Stats at Pro Football Reference

William Leslie "Buddy" Aydelette (born August 19, 1956) is an American former professional football player who was a guard in the National Football League (NFL) and United States Football League (USFL). He was drafted by the Green Bay Packers in the 7th round (169th overall) of the 1980 NFL draft. Over the three seasons Aydelette started for the Birmingham Stallions, he would make every USFL All-League team and every TSN USFL All-Star Team.

In 1983, the Stallions offense led the league in rushing. In 1984, the Stallions would again lead the league in rushing averaging 184 yards rushing per game and QB Cliff Stoudt would finish with a 101.6 QB rating, good for 3rd in the league. They would end the season as the league's #2 offense, behind the run and shoot offense of Jim Kelly's Houston Gamblers. The 1985 team would finish 3rd in the league in offense behind the Gamblers and Bobby Hebert's Oakland Invaders team.

After the USFL folded, Aydelette finished his football career with one final season in the NFL with the Pittsburgh Steelers.
