= Earl Gant =

American football player (born 1957)

Earl Leon Gant (born July 6, 1957) is an American former professional football player who was a running back for the Kansas City Chiefs of the National Football League (NFL) . He played college football for the Missouri Tigers. He also played professionally in the United States Football League (USFL) for the Birmingham Stallions.
