= Billy Cesare =

American football player (born 1955)

No. 44, 33, 40, 20
- Position: Defensive back

Personal information
- Born: June 2, 1955 (age 71); New York, New York, U.S.
- Listed height: 5 ft 11 in (1.80 m)
- Listed weight: 190 lb (86 kg)

Career information
- High school: Miami Beach (Miami Beach, Florida)
- College: Miami
- NFL draft: 1978: undrafted

Career history
- Tampa Bay Buccaneers (1978–1979); Cleveland Browns (1980)*; Miami Dolphins (1980); Tampa Bay Buccaneers (1981); Detroit Lions (1982); Birmingham Stallions (1983–1984); Jacksonville Bulls (1984); Pittsburgh Maulers (1984); New Jersey Generals (1984)
- * Offseason or practice squad member only
- Stats at Pro Football Reference

William Joseph Cesare (born June 2, 1955) is an American former professional football player who was a defensive back for five seasons in the National Football League (NFL) with the Tampa Bay Buccaneers, Miami Dolphins, and Detroit Lions. He played college football for the Memphis Tigers and Miami. Cesare also played in the United States Football League (USFL).

== Early life and college ==
William Joseph Cesare was born on June 2, 1955, in New York City. He attended Miami Beach Senior High School in Miami Beach, Florida.

Cesare was a member of the Memphis State Tigers of Memphis State University from 1973 to 1974. He was then a member of the Miami Hurricanes of the University of Miami from 1975 to 1977.

== Professional career ==
Cesare signed with the Tampa Bay Buccaneers of the National Football League (NFL) after going undrafted in the 1978 NFL draft. He was released on September 7 but re-signed on September 11. He played in ten games for the Buccaneers during the 1978 season, recovering one fumble, before being placed on injured reserve on November 30, 1978. Cesare appeared in all 16 games in 1979 and also two postseason games. He became a free agent after the 1979 season. He mostly played special teams during his time with the Buccaneers.

Cesare was signed by the Cleveland Browns on March 28, 1980. He voluntarily left the team on August 20, 1980, stating he did not want to play football anymore. He was waived by the Browns on August 21, 1980.

Cesare later signed with the Miami Dolphins on December 11, 1980. He played in two games for the Dolphins during the 1980 season. He was released on February 1, 1981.

Cesare signed with the Buccaneers again on May 1, 1981. He played in all 16 regular-season games in 1981 and also one playoff game. He was released on September 6, 1982.

Cesare was signed by the Detroit Lions on November 19, 1982. He was placed on injured reserve on December 1 and later activated on December 31, 1982. Overall, he appeared in two regular-season games and one postseason game in 1982. Cesare became a free agent after the 1982 season.

Cesare signed with the Birmingham Stallions of the United States Football League (USFL) on February 28, 1983. He started all 18 games for the Stallions during the 1983 USFL season, recording four interceptions for 52 yards, as Birmingham finished the season 9–9.

Cesare played in eight games, starting one, for the Jacksonville Bulls of the USFL in 1984 and posted one sack. He was waived on April 24, 1984.

Cesare was claimed off waivers by the Pittsburgh Maulers on April 25, 1984. He was released on April 28, 1984, before appearing in any games.

Cesare signed with the USFL's New Jersey Generals on May 9, 1984. He played in seven games for the Generals in 1984. He was released on February 11, 1985.

== Personal life ==
Cesare became a horse trainer after his football career.

He was previously married to tennis player Allegra Pero, the daughter of tennis player George Pero.
