= Lonnie Johnson (American football) =

American football player (born 1971)

No. 84, 83
- Position: Tight end

Personal information
- Born: February 14, 1971 (age 55); Miami, Florida, U.S.
- Listed height: 6 ft 3 in (1.91 m)
- Listed weight: 240 lb (109 kg)

Career information
- High school: Miami
- College: Florida State
- NFL draft: 1994: 2nd round, 61st overall pick

Career history
- Buffalo Bills (1994–1998); Kansas City Chiefs (1999)

Awards and highlights
- National champion (1993); Second-team All-ACC (1993)

Career NFL statistics
- Receptions: 163
- Receiving yards: 1,587
- Touchdowns: 6
- Stats at Pro Football Reference

Lonnie Demetrius Johnson (born February 14, 1971) is an American former professional football player who was a tight end in the National Football League (NFL). He was selected by the Buffalo Bills in the second round of the 1994 NFL draft with the 61st overall pick. He played college football for the Florida State Seminoles.

Johnson also played for the Kansas City Chiefs.
