= Cliff Stoudt =

American football player (born 1955)

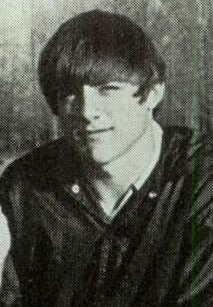
- Stoudt in 1972

No. 18
- Position: Quarterback

Personal information
- Born: March 27, 1955 (age 71); Oberlin, Ohio, U.S.
- Listed height: 6 ft 4 in (1.93 m)
- Listed weight: 215 lb (98 kg)

Career information
- High school: Oberlin
- College: Youngstown State
- NFL draft: 1977: 5th round, 121st overall pick

Career history
- Pittsburgh Steelers (1977–1983); Birmingham Stallions (1984–1985); St. Louis/Phoenix Cardinals (1986–1988); Miami Dolphins (1989); Dallas Cowboys (1990)

Awards and highlights
- 2× Super Bowl champion (XIII, XIV)

Career NFL statistics
- Passing attempts: 684
- Passing completions: 359
- Completion percentage: 52.5%
- TD–INT: 23–43
- Passing yards: 4,506
- Passer rating: 58.3
- Stats at Pro Football Reference

Clifford Lewis Stoudt (born March 27, 1955) is an American former professional football player who was a quarterback in the National Football League (NFL) for the Pittsburgh Steelers, St. Louis/Phoenix Cardinals, Miami Dolphins and Dallas Cowboys. He also was a member of the Birmingham Stallions of the United States Football League (USFL). Stoudt played college football for the Youngstown State Penguins. He was selected in the fifth round of the 1977 NFL draft by the Steelers.

== Early life ==
Stoudt attended Oberlin High School, where he played quarterback. He also was one of the state's top prep golfers.

Stoudt accepted a football scholarship from Youngstown State University, where he became a four-year starter. As a sophomore, he led the Penguins to an 8–1 regular season record and the school's first appearance at the NCAA Division II playoffs, where they lost against the University of Delaware.

As a junior, he posted 1,022 passing yards and 406 rushing yards. As a senior, he started all 10 games, passing for 1,259 yards and 5 touchdowns, while also rushing for 307 yards and 7 touchdowns.

He finished his college career with 303 completions out of 637 attempts for 4,387 yards (second in school history), 5,459 total yards (second in school history) and 16 touchdowns.

In 1987, he was inducted into the YSU Athletics Hall of Fame.

== Professional career ==
=== Pittsburgh Steelers ===
Stoudt was selected by the Pittsburgh Steelers in the fifth round (121st overall) of the 1977 NFL draft. Stoudt was the third-string quarterback to Terry Bradshaw from 1977 to 1979. At the time he set an NFL record, after spending the first 56 games of his career as an active roster member without appearing in an official game.

In 1980, he became Bradshaw's backup. His first career start came against the Cleveland Browns.

In 1981, Stoudt broke the ulna in his right arm after he tried to hit a strength tester machine in a Seattle bar but missed and hit a post instead. As a result, when Bradshaw broke his hand late in the season, third-stringer Mark Malone played the last three games instead of Stoudt.

In 1983, he took over as the starter during Bradshaw's injury-plagued final season. He led the Steelers to a 9–2 start, but the team melted down late in the season. Steeler fans, accustomed to Bradshaw's late game heroics, turned viciously on Stoudt. The Steelers won the AFC Central with a 10–6 record and stumbled into the playoffs, but were quickly dispatched by the Los Angeles Raiders.

=== Birmingham Stallions ===
In 1984, Stoudt left the NFL and signed with the Birmingham Stallions of the United States Football League. The third game of the season was the home opener for the Pittsburgh Maulers on March 11 at Three Rivers Stadium, Stoudt was heckled and pelted with snowballs by fans who remembered his lackluster performance of a year earlier. It would turn out to be the only sellout in the one season history of the Maulers.

Stoudt started every game, registering 3,121 passing yards, 26 passing touchdown, 400 rushing yards, 9 rushing touchdowns and 7 interceptions, while leading the team to a division championship and ranking No. 2 overall in quarterback rating (behind Jim Kelly).

In 1985, he had 3,358 passing yards, 34 passing touchdowns, 437 rushing yards, 5 rushing touchdowns and 19 interceptions, repeating as division champion and the No. 2 overall quarterback rating. He led the Stallions to a two-year record of 27-9 (no other team won more games), while passing for 6,479 yards, 60 touchdowns and 26 interceptions. He was a Second Team selection to the 1985 All-USFL team.

In 1986, the league ceased operations after losing most of its claims in an antitrust suit against the National Football League, with its top talent absorbed by the NFL in a dispersal draft conducted in the aftermath.

=== St. Louis / Phoenix Cardinals ===
Because the Pittsburgh Steelers still owned the rights to Stoudt, on September 1, 1986, he was traded to the St. Louis Cardinals in exchange for a conditional draft choice (fifth round #121-Darin Jordan). He served as Neil Lomax's backup and was also the team holder on kicks. He had two starts each in 1986 and 1988. In 1989, Stoudt asked for his release after the team acquired free agent Gary Hogeboom and he was cut in March of that year.

=== Miami Dolphins ===
On April 14, 1989, he was signed as a free agent by the Miami Dolphins. Although he performed well during most of training camp, he was released on September 3, after he had two interceptions returned for touchdowns in the Dolphins' 20-10 preseason loss against the Philadelphia Eagles and Scott Secules was promoted as the backup to Dan Marino. On September 7, he was re-signed when Marino suffered a right bruised elbow on his throwing arm. He appeared in 3 games and didn't attempt a pass. He was cut on August 28, 1990.

=== Dallas Cowboys ===
On December 24, 1990, he was signed by the Dallas Cowboys, to be an emergency back-up quarterback to Babe Laufenberg for the season's final game against the Atlanta Falcons, after Troy Aikman suffered a right shoulder injury in Week 15.

In 1991, he went into training camp with Aikman, Laufenberg, and fourth-round draft choice Bill Musgrave at quarterback. On August 25, the Cowboys traded for Steve Beuerlein to improve the backup position and released Stoudt the next day, opting to keep just 2 quarterbacks.

== Career statistics ==
=== NFL statistics ===
Year	Team	GP	Passing							
Year	Team	GP	Cmp	Att	Pct	Yds	Avg	TD	Int	Rtg
1980	PIT	6	32	60	53.3	493	8.2	2	2	78.0
1981	PIT	2	1	3	33.3	17	5.7	0	0	53.5
1982	PIT	6	14	35	40.0	154	4.4	0	5	14.2
1983	PIT	16	197	381	51.7	2,553	6.7	12	21	60.5
1986	STL	5	52	91	57.1	542	6.0	3	7	53.5
1987	STL	12	0	1	0.0	0	0.0	0	0	39.6
1988	PHX	16	63	113	55.8	747	6.6	6	8	64.3
1989	MIA	3	0	0	0.0	0	0.0	0	0	0.0
Career		66	359	684	52.5	4,506	6.76	23	43	58.3

=== USFL statistics ===
Year	Team	GP	Passing							
Year	Team	GP	Cmp	Att	Pct	Yds	Avg	TD	Int	Rtg
1984	Birmingham Stallions	18	212	366	57.9	3,121	8.5	26	7	101.6
1985	Birmingham Stallions	18	266	444	59.9	3,358	7.6	34	19	91.2
Career		36	478	810	59.0	6,479	8.0	60	26	95.9

== Personal life ==
He lives in Greenville, South Carolina. His son, Cole, is a former quarterback at Clemson and currently the quarterbacks coach at Morehead State. Another son, Zack, played quarterback at Ole Miss.

Preceded by Bob Lane	Birmingham Stallions Starting quarterbacks 1985	Succeeded by none
