= Charlie Trotman (American football) =

American football player (born 1958)

No. 6, 24
- Positions: Quarterback, Safety

Personal information
- Born: March 15, 1958 (age 68); Montgomery, Alabama, U.S.
- Listed height: 5 ft 10 in (1.78 m)
- Listed weight: 185 lb (84 kg)

Career information
- High school: Jefferson Davis High School
- College: Auburn

Career history
- Birmingham Stallions (1983)

Awards and highlights
- Cliff Hare Award (1980)

Charles Rodgers Trotman (born March 15, 1958) is an American former football quarterback and safety who played one season in the United States Football League for the Birmingham Stallions. He went to college at Auburn.

== Early life ==
Charlie Trotman was born on March 15, 1958, in Montgomery, Alabama. He went to Jefferson Davis High School.

== College career ==
Trotman went to college at Auburn. He was their quarterback from 1977 to 1979. In 1980 he won the Cliff Hare Award.

== Later career ==
After he graduated he became an attorney. In 1983 he made a return to football by playing in a few games for the Birmingham Stallions as a safety. His only stat was a 11-yard kick return. He later was an Auburn Tigers football announcer.
