= Reggie Lewis (defensive lineman, born 1956) =

American football player (born 1956)

No. 79
- Position: Defensive end

Personal information
- Born: May 6, 1956 (age 70); Port Arthur, Texas, U.S.
- Listed height: 6 ft 3 in (1.91 m)
- Listed weight: 200 lb (91 kg)

Career information
- High school: Lincoln
- College: North Texas
- NFL draft: 1979: 3rd round, 78th overall pick

Career history
- Tampa Bay Buccaneers (1979–1980)

Reginald Paul Lewis (born May 6, 1956) is an American former professional football player who was a defensive end for the Tampa Bay Buccaneers of the National Football League (NFL). He played college football for the North Texas Mean Green.
