= Mike Murphy (gridiron football) =

American football coach (born 1944)

Personal information
- Born: September 25, 1944 (age 82); New York City, New York, U.S.

Career information
- College: Huron

Career history

Coaching
- Vermont (1970–1973) Defensive line coach; Idaho State (1974–1975) Defensive line coach; Idaho State (1976) Defensive coordinator; Western Illinois (1977–1978) Linebackers coach; Saskatchewan Roughriders (1979–1983) Defensive coordinator; Chicago Blitz (1984) Defensive line coach; Detroit Lions (1985–1989) Linebackers coach; Phoenix Cardinals (1990–1993) Linebackers coach; Seattle Seahawks (1995–1997) Linebackers coach; Indianapolis Colts (1998–2011) Linebackers coach; Indianapolis Colts (2011) Defensive coordinator

Operations
- Carolina Panthers (1994) Executive of professional personnel

Awards and highlights
- Super Bowl champion (XLI)

Mike Murphy (born September 25, 1944) is an American football coach who held a variety of defensive coaching positions at the college and professional levels of the sport over a period of four decades, starting in 1970.

Murphy was the defensive line coach for Vermont from 1970 to 1973 and Idaho State from 1974 to 1975. He became the defensive coordinator for Idaho State in 1976. He was the linebackers coach at Western Illinois from 1977 to 1978 before becoming the defensive coordinator for the Saskatchewan Roughriders of the Canadian Football League (CFL) from 1979 to 1983. In 1984, he was the defensive line coach for the Chicago Blitz of the United States Football League (USFL).

Murphy coached the linebackers for the Detroit Lions of the National Football League (NFL) from 1985 to 1989. He was the inside linebackers coach for the Phoenix Cardinals from 1990 to 1993. He was also a pro personnel executive for the Carolina Panthers in 1994. He then was the linebackers coach for the Seattle Seahawks from 1995 to 1997.

Murphy joined the Indianapolis Colts in 1998 as the team's linebackers coach. He held the position until 2011, during which he was given the role of defensive coordinator following Larry Coyer's firing. He retired following the 2011 season.
