= Johnnie Dirden =

American football player (born 1952)

No. 81, 80, 87
- Positions: Wide receiver, kick returner

Personal information
- Born: March 14, 1954 (age 72); Houston, Texas, U.S.
- Listed height: 6 ft 0 in (1.83 m)
- Listed weight: 188 lb (85 kg)

Career information
- High school: Stephen F. Austin (Houston)
- College: Sam Houston State
- Supplemental draft: 1978: 10th round

Career history
- Houston Oilers (1978); Kansas City Chiefs (1979); Pittsburgh Steelers (1981)

Career NFL statistics
- Games played: 26
- Kick returns: 42
- Return yards: 979
- Stats at Pro Football Reference

Johnnie B. Dirden Jr. (born March 14, 1954) is an American former professional football player who was a wide receiver for three seasons in the National Football League (NFL) with the Houston Oilers, the Kansas City Chiefs, and the Pittsburgh Steelers. He played college football for the Sam Houston State Bearkats. He now resides in Denver, Colorado.
