= 1983 Los Angeles Express season =

Defunct football team in the USFL

- Head coach: Hugh Campbell
- Home stadium: Los Angeles Memorial Coliseum

Results
- Record: 8–10
- Division place: 2nd Pacific Division (USFL)
- Playoffs: Did not qualify

The 1983 season was the inaugural season for the Los Angeles Express in the United States Football League. The Express were led by head coach Hugh Campbell and finished with a 8–10 record.

== Schedule ==
Week	Date	Opponent	Result	Record	Venue	Attendance
1	March 6	New Jersey Generals	W 20–15	1–0	Los Angeles Memorial Coliseum	32,008
2	March 14	Washington Federals	W 20–3	2–0	Los Angeles Memorial Coliseum	22,453
3	March 19	at Arizona Wranglers	L 14–21	2–1	Sun Devil Stadium	29,335
4	March 27	at Chicago Blitz	L 14–20	2–2	Soldier Field	10,936
5	April 3	Oakland Invaders	W 10–7	3–2	Los Angeles Memorial Coliseum	17,139
6	April 10	Philadelphia Stars	L 3–17	3–3	Los Angeles Memorial Coliseum	18,671
7	April 18	at Tampa Bay Bandits	W 18–13	4–3	Tampa Stadium	32,223
8	April 23	at Michigan Panthers	L 24–34	4–4	Pontiac Silverdome	13,184
9	May 1	Chicago Blitz	L 17–38	4–5	Los Angeles Memorial Coliseum	21,123
10	May 7	Boston Breakers	W 23–20	5–5	Los Angeles Memorial Coliseum	16,307
11	May 14	at Birmingham Stallions	L 20–35	5–6	Legion Field	42,212
12	May 22	at Denver Gold	W 14–10	6–6	Mile High Stadium	32,963
13	May 29	at Oakland Invaders	L 10–20	6–7	Oakland-Alameda County Coliseum	28,967
14	June 5	Arizona Wranglers	W 17–13	7–7	Los Angeles Memorial Coliseum	13,826
15	June 12	Michigan Panthers	L 17–42	7–8	Los Angeles Memorial Coliseum	16,023
16	June 17	at New Jersey Generals	L 13–20	7–9	Giants Stadium	31,807
17	June 26	at Washington Federals	L 21–28	7–10	RFK Stadium	9,792
18	July 3	Denver Gold	W 21–14	8–10	Los Angeles Memorial Coliseum	11,471

== Standings ==
USFL Pacific Division
	W	L	T	PCT	DIV	PF	PA	STK
Oakland Invaders	9	9	0	.500	4–2	319	319	W1
Los Angeles Express	8	10	0	.444	3–3	296	370	W1
Denver Gold	7	11	0	.389	2–4	284	304	L2
Arizona Wranglers	4	14	0	.222	2–4	261	442	L10

== Roster ==
=== Opening Day roster ===
Los Angeles Express 1983 Opening Day Roster (at 6-Mar-83)
Quarterbacks: 15 Mike Rae; 14 Tom Ramsey; Running backs: 24 Tony Boddie RB; 28 Anthony Davis HB; 32 LaRue Harrington FB; 31 Wilbert Haslip FB; Wide receivers: 84 Kevin Williams; 85 Vister Hayes WR; 81 Lonnie Turner; 89 Mike Harris WR; Tight ends: 88 Ricky Ellis; 80 Vic Rakhshani; 86 Mike Sherrod TE/WR	Offensive linemen: 78 Gus Coppens LT; 71 Wayne FaaLafua RT; 79 Mike Fields LG; 64 Chuck Pitcock RG; 60 Mike Durrette LG; 69 Pat Cornelius C; Defensive linemen: 61 Eddie Weaver NT; 99 Greg Fields; 74 Dennis Edwards; 73 Junior Filiaga NT; 77 Charles Philyaw DT; 70 Clifton Alapa DE	Linebackers: 53 Danny Rich LOLB; 54 David Aupiu LB; 59 Ron Seawell RILB; 51 Eric Scoggins; 57 Dann Lute LB; 56 Greg Williams LB; Defensive backs: 22 Wymon Henderson; 23 David Croudip CB; 42 Scott Byers FS; 40 Al Burleson SS; 20 Tyrone Justin CB; 27 Mike Fox FS; Special teams: 2 Vince Abbott K; 4 Glen Walker P	Developmental squad: 12 Russ Jensen QB; 18 Brian Broomell QB; 21 John Barnett RB; 83 Kris Haines WR; 72 Phil Murphy DT; 92 Rich Dimler DE; 55 Jerome Franey LB; 58 Ken Faul LB; 43 Bobby Hosea SS	Injured reserve rookies in italics 40 Active, 9 Developmental

=== 1983 Los Angeles Express final roster ===
Los Angeles Express 1983 Final Game Roster (at 3-Jul-83)
Quarterbacks: 15 Mike Rae; 18 Russ Jensen; Running backs: 21 John Barnett RB; 24 Tony Boddie RB; 32 LaRue Harrington FB; 31 Wilbert Haslip FB; Wide receivers: 87 Anthony Allen; 26 JoJo Townsell; 81 Greg Moser; Tight ends: 88 Ricky Ellis; 86 Mike Sherrod WR/TE	Offensive linemen: 78 Gus Coppens LT; 72 Eric Moran RT; 60 Mike Durrette LG; 64 Chuck Pitcock RG; 71 Wayne Faalafua OT; 67 Michael Wilson G/T; 50 Carl Allen C; 69 Pat Cornelius C; 65 Wayne Jones C/LS; Defensive linemen: 61 Eddie Weaver LDT; 92 Rich Dimler; 99 Greg Fields; 70 Clifton Alapa RDE; 73 Junior Filiaga NT; 77 Charles Philyaw DT	Linebackers: 53 Danny Rich LLB; 56 Greg Williams MLB; 51 Eric Scoggins; 54 David Aupiu LB; 59 Ron Seawell LB; 57 Dan Lute LB; 55 Jerome Franey LB; 58 Rickey Orange LB; Defensive backs: 22 Wymon Henderson; 20 Tyrone Justin RCB; 27 Mike Fox FS; 43 Bobby Hosea SS; 23 David Croudip CB; 46 Robert Sparks SS; 38 Rodney Weber FS; 33 Brett Axelson DB; Special teams: 2 Vince Abbott K; 16 Jeff Partridge P	Developmental squad: 14 Tom Ramsey QB; 85 Vister Hayes WR; 80 Grady Richardson TE; 83 Kris Haines WR; 76 Denver Johnson T; 75 George Achica DT; 52 John Barefield LB	Injured reserve rookies in italics 40 Active, 9 Developmental
