= 1984 Los Angeles Express season =

Defunct football team in the USFL

- Head coach: John Hadl
- Home stadium: Los Angeles Memorial Coliseum

Results
- Record: 10–8
- Division place: 1st Pacific Division (USFL)
- Conference place: 2nd, Western Conference
- Playoffs: Won Divisional Playoffs (vs. Michigan Panthers) 27–21; Lost Western Conference Championship (vs. Arizona Wranglers) 25–35

The 1984 season was the second season for the Los Angeles Express in the United States Football League. The Express were led by new head coach John Hadl and finished with a 10–8 record, clinching the Pacific division and qualifying for the playoffs and improving on their record from the previous season by two games. The Express faced and defeated the Michigan Panthers, the Central division wildcard team, 27-21, at home in the divisional playoff game. They then faced their division rivals, the Arizona Wranglers, whom had upset the heavily favored Central division champion Houston Gamblers in a divisional playoff matchup, in the Western Conference title game. The Express had finished the regular season tied with the Wranglers with a record of 10-8 before winning the Pacific division on a tie breaker. The Express lost the game, which was played in Sun Devil Stadium, 35-25.

== Schedule ==
Week	Date	Opponent	Result	Record	Venue	Attendance
1	February 26	Denver Gold	L 10–27	0–1	Los Angeles Memorial Coliseum	32,082
2	March 4	Birmingham Stallions	L 14-21	0-2	Los Angeles Memorial Coliseum	14,789
3	March 11	at Oakland Invaders	W 10–0	1-2	Oakland-Alameda County Coliseum	23,479
4	March 17	at San Antonio Gunslingers	W 13-12	2–2	Alamo Stadium	9,821
5	March 25	Jacksonville Bulls	L 7-13	2-3	Los Angeles Memorial Coliseum	8,000
6	April 1	New Jersey Generals	L 10–26	2-4	Los Angeles Memorial Coliseum	19,853
7	April 9	at Denver Gold	L 27–35	2–5	Mile High Stadium	19,115
8	April 14	Memphis Showboats	W 23–17 (OT)	3–5	Los Angeles Memorial Coliseum	10,049
9	April 20	at Chicago Blitz	L 29–49	3–6	Soldier Field	11,713
10	April 30	at Houston Gamblers	W 27–24 (OT)	4–6	Astrodome	30,727
11	May 5	Pittsburgh Maulers	W 20–12	5–6	Los Angeles Memorial Coliseum	16,789
12	May 13	at Philadelphia Stars	L 14–18	5–7	Veterans Stadium	22,391
13	May 20	Michigan Panthers	W 24–17	6–7	Los Angeles Memorial Coliseum	10,193
14	May 26	Arizona Wranglers	W 24-17	7–7	Los Angeles Memorial Coliseum	11,702
15	June 3	at Washington Federals	W 35–21	8-7	RFK Stadium	5,263
16	June 10	at Oklahoma Outlaws	W 17–10	9-7	Skelly Stadium	22,017
17	June 15	Oakland Invaders	W 24–19	10-17	Los Angeles Memorial Coliseum	14,794
18	July 3	Arizona Wranglers	L 10–35	10–8	Sun Devil Stadium	35,258

=== Playoff schedule ===
Round	Date	Opponent	Result	Record	Location
Divisional Playoffs	June 30	Michigan Panthers	W 27–21 (3 OT)	1–0	Los Angeles Memorial Coliseum
Western Conference Championship	July 17	Arizona Wranglers	L 25–35	1–1	Sun Devil Stadium

== Rosters ==
=== Opening Day roster ===
1984 Los Angeles Express Opening Day roster
Quarterbacks: 8 Steve Young; 15 Tom Ramsey; 10 Frank Seurer; Running backs: 3 Kevin Nelson FB; 27 Kevin Mack FB; 25 Mel Gray RB; 24 Tony Boddie RB; 32 LaRue Harrington FB; 31 Reggie Brown FB; 81 David Hersey RB/TE; Wide receivers: 87 Anthony Allen; 26 JoJo Townsell; 83 Duane Gunn; 87 Freddie Scott; 84 Malcolm Moore; Tight ends: 88 Ricky Ellis RB/TE; 86 Mike Sherrod WR/TE; 89 Darren Long	Offensive linemen: 70 Derrick Kennard G; 78 Gus Coppens LT; 60 Mike Durrette LG; 72 Jeff Hart RG; 66 Chris Foote C; 67 Michael Wilson G/T; 66 Terry Crouch G; 55 Mike Ruether OL /TE/LB; 62 Greg Loberg OL; Defensive linemen: 61 Eddie Weaver DT/DE; 92 Rich Dimler; 71 Dewey Forte DT; 90 Fletcher Jenkins DE /DT; 95 Ivan Lesnik DT; 99 James Robinson DT; 79 Charles Ussery RDT; 73 Lee Williams RDE	Linebackers: 52 John Truitt LB; 53 Danny Rich LLB; 56 Greg Williams MLB; 58 David Howard; 54 Howard Carson; 50 Kevin Turner LB; 57 Dan Lute LB; 55 Jerome Franey LB; 58 Rickey Orange LB; Defensive backs: 22 Wymon Henderson; 20 Tyrone Justin RCB; 27 Mike Fox FS; 43 Dwight Drane DB; 43 Gary Lowell CB/WR; 46 Darrell Patillo CB; 23 Ed Scott DB; 47 Troy West S; 34 Aaron Mitchell FS; Special teams: 11 Tony Zendejas K; 16 Jeff Partridge P	Developmental squad: 55 Sam Norris LB; 65 Wayne Jones G; 63 Doug West LB; 14 Tom Ramsey QB; 76 Denver Johnson T; 75 George Achica DT	Injured reserve: rookies in italics; 55 Active, 5 Developmental

== Final roster ==
1984 Los Angeles Express final roster
Quarterbacks: 8 Steve Young; 15 Tom Ramsey; 10 Frank Seurer; Running backs: 3 Kevin Nelson FB; 27 Kevin Mack FB; 25 Mel Gray RB; 24 Tony Boddie RB; 32 LaRue Harrington FB; 31 Reggie Brown FB; 81 David Hersey RB/TE; Wide receivers: 87 Anthony Allen; 26 JoJo Townsell; 83 Duane Gunn; 87 Freddie Scott; 84 Malcolm Moore; Tight ends: 88 Ricky Ellis RB/TE; 86 Mike Sherrod WR/TE; 89 Darren Long	Offensive linemen: 70 Derrick Kennard G; 78 Gus Coppens LT; 60 Mike Durrette LG; 72 Jeff Hart RG; 66 Chris Foote C; 67 Michael Wilson G/T; 66 Terry Crouch G; 55 Mike Ruether OL /TE/LB; 62 Greg Loberg OL; Defensive linemen: 61 Eddie Weaver DT/DE; 75 George Achica DT; 71 Dewey Forte DT; 90 Fletcher Jenkins DE /DT; 95 Ivan Lesnik DT; 99 James Robinson DT; 73 Lee Williams RDE	Linebackers: 52 John Truitt LB; 53 Danny Rich LLB; 58 David Howard; 54 Howard Carson; 50 Kevin Turner LB; Defensive backs: 22 Wymon Henderson; 20 Tyrone Justin RCB; 27 Mike Fox FS; 48 David Rackley DB; 43 Dwight Drane DB; 43 Gary Lowell CB/WR; 46 Darrell Patillo CB; 23 Ed Scott DB; 47 Troy West S; 34 Aaron Mitchell FS; Special teams: 11 Tony Zendejas K; 16 Jeff Partridge P	Developmental squad: -- John Barnett RB; -- Kirby Warren RB; 55 Sam Norris LB; 65 Wayne Jones G; 56 Greg Williams MLB; 63 Doug West LB; -- Timmy White WR / RB; 85 Gordon Hudson WR; 14 Tom Ramsey QB; 76 Denver Johnson T; 57 Dann Lute LB	Injured reserve: None - N/A; rookies in italics 50 Active, 11 Developmental
