= 1983 Tampa Bay Bandits season =

Defunct football team in the USFL

- Head coach: Steve Spurrier
- Home stadium: Tampa Stadium

Results
- Record: 11–7
- Division place: 3rd Central Division
- Playoffs: Did not qualify

The 1983 season was the inaugural season for the Tampa Bay Bandits in the United States Football League. The Bandits were led by head coach Steve Spurrier and finished with a 11–7 record.

== Schedule ==
| Week | Date | Opponent | Result | Record | Venue | Attendance |
|---|---|---|---|---|---|---|
| 1 | March 6 | Boston Breakers | W 21–17 | 1–0 | Tampa Stadium | 42,437 |
| 2 | March 12 | Michigan Panthers | W 19–7 | 2–0 | Tampa Stadium | 38,789 |
| 3 | March 20 | at New Jersey Generals | W 32–9 | 3–0 | Giants Stadium | 53,307 |
| 4 | March 27 | at Philadelphia Stars | W 27–22 | 4–0 | Veterans Stadium | 18,718 |
| 5 | April 2 | Chicago Blitz | L 3–42 | 4–1 | Tampa Stadium | 46,585 |
| 6 | April 9 | at Denver Gold | W 22–16 (OT) | 5–1 | Mile High Stadium | 46,848 |
| 7 | April 18 | Los Angeles Express | L 13–18 | 5–2 | Tampa Stadium | 32,223 |
| 8 | April 24 | at Washington Federals | W 30–23 | 6–2 | RFK Stadium | 9,070 |
| 9 | April 30 | Philadelphia Stars | L 10–24 | 6–3 | Tampa Stadium | 41,559 |
| 10 | May 8 | at Oakland Invaders | W 17–10 | 7–3 | Oakland-Alameda County Coliseum | 26,989 |
| 11 | May 15 | Arizona Wranglers | W 20–14 | 8–3 | Tampa Stadium | 32,327 |
| 12 | May 21 | Oakland Invaders | W 29–9 | 9–3 | Tampa Stadium | 43,389 |
| 13 | May 30 | at Michigan Panthers | L 7–43 | 9–4 | Pontiac Silverdome | 23,976 |
| 14 | June 5 | Birmingham Stallions | W 45–17 | 10–4 | Tampa Stadium | 35,623 |
| 15 | June 12 | at Chicago Blitz | L 9–31 | 10–5 | Soldier Field | 21,249 |
| 16 | June 19 | at Boston Breakers | L 17–24 | 10–6 | Nickerson Field | 15,530 |
| 17 | June 27 | Denver Gold | W 26–23 | 11–6 | Tampa Stadium | 46,128 |
| 18 | July 2 | at Birmingham Stallions | L 17–29 | 11–7 | Legion Field | 20,300 |

== Standings ==
USFL Central Division
| | W | L | T | PCT | DIV | PF | PA | STK |
|---|---|---|---|---|---|---|---|---|
| Michigan Panthers | 12 | 6 | 0 | .667 | 4–2 | 451 | 337 | W4 |
| Chicago Blitz | 12 | 6 | 0 | .667 | 4–2 | 456 | 271 | W1 |
| Tampa Bay Bandits | 11 | 7 | 0 | .611 | 2–4 | 363 | 378 | L1 |
| Birmingham Stallions | 9 | 9 | 0 | .500 | 2–4 | 343 | 326 | W1 |

== Roster ==
1983 Tampa Bay Bandits roster
| Quarterbacks: 15 Jimmy Jordan; 7 John Reaves; Running backs: 21 Greg Boone; 23 George Ragsdale; 34 Willie Wilder FB; 44 Ricky Williams; Wide receivers: 42 Danny Buggs; 81 Martin Cox; 83 Jim Fitzpatrick; 88 Willie Gillespie; 80 Anthony Stephens; 84 Eric Truvillion; Tight ends: 86 Lewis Gilbert; 61 Wes Phillips; 87 Bob Young | Offensive linemen: 69 Steve Gettel T; 64 Bobby Hopkins G; 60 Doug Mackie T; 66 Bob Norris G; 70 Joe Robinson T; 67 Bob Van Duyne C; 55 Bill Winters C; Defensive linemen: 63 Curtis Bunche DE; 75 Walter Carter DE; 68 Fred Nordgren DT; 78 Jim Ramey DE; 74 Ken Times DT | Linebackers: 56 Keith Clark; 45 Mike Goedecker; 54 Tony Hayes; 55 Kelly Kirchbaum; 53 Paul Piurowski; 59 Russ Washington; Defensive backs: 25 Alvin Bailey; 28 Doug Beaudoin; 32 Glen Edwards; 33 Jeff George; 20 Tim Groves; 36 Ken Taylor; 22 Leon Williams; Special teams: 9 Zenon Andrusyshyn K/P | Reserve lists: 65 Ed Gantner DT; 46 Warren Hanna DB; 58 Alonzo Johnson LB; 11 Nat Koonce QB; 52 Merv Krakau LB; 62 Ron Mikolajczyk T; 72 Ray Robinson LB; 50 Ron Simmons G; 48 Jim Tyson LB; 30 Greg Wilson RB; added during season: 43 Gary Anderson RB; 83 Jim Fitzpatrick WR; 32 Carl Franks RB; 35 Richard Holmes FB; 12 Mike Kelley QB; 29 Sam Platt RB; rookies in italics |
