= 1983 Washington Federals season =

Defunct football team in the USFL

- Owner: Berl Bernhard
- General manager: Ray Jauch
- Head coach: Ray Jauch
- Home stadium: RFK Stadium

Results
- Record: 4-14
- Division place: 4th Atlantic Division
- Playoffs: Did not qualify

Uniform
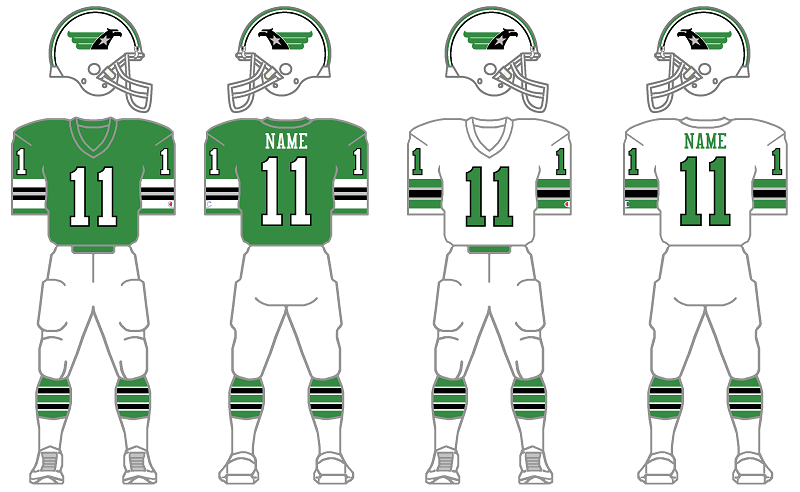

The team lured Ray Jauch to be its head coach; he had previously guided the Edmonton Eskimos and Winnipeg Blue Bombers to success in the Canadian Football League. At the time he was the fourth-winningest coach in CFL history. The Federals initially made a splash by signing running back Craig James, one half of the famous "Pony Express" backfield at SMU. More than any other team in the league, the Federals seemed dogged by inconsistency, bad timing, and terrible luck. A week before the season even began, their player personnel expert bolted to the NFL's New York Jets. The team changed quarterbacks almost weekly, with in-game quarterback changes in a number of games. Jauch's biggest mistake was probably giving the opening day starter, NFL veteran Kim McQuilken, the quick hook for rookie quarterback Mike Hohensee. From there the team never seemed to settle in with a quarterback for more than a few games in a row, and when McQuilken did play, he often pressed, forcing his throws into coverage. The team alternated between McQuilken and Hohensee, with occasional appearances by former Pittsburgh Steelers quarterback "Jefferson Street" Joe Gilliam, who was far past his prime; he had last played a meaningful professional down in 1975, and he only threw for 673 yards. The only other quarterback on the team was rookie Mike Forslund, who never played.

Injuries also dogged the team. James was sidelined for five games with a fractured vertebra. Hohensee only played in nine games all season. At one point, all of the Federals′ receivers had leg injuries. The Federals had good linebackers in Joe Harris, Dan Lloyd, and Jeff McIntyre, who was Washington's best outside linebacker and could cover receivers downfield and stop the run. McIntyre lead the team in tackles and sacks until an ankle injury sidelined him for the final six games.

The first game in franchise history was a portent of things to come; the Federals were drilled at RFK Stadium 28–7 by the Chicago Blitz, the preseason title favorites coached by former Washington Redskins coach George Allen. The game was played on March 6, 1983. The Blitz, led by former Detroit Lions and Baltimore Colts quarterback Greg Landry, raced out to a 28–0 lead. The Blitz held Washington to only one first down and a mere 24 yards total offense in the first half; Chicago led 21–0 before the Federals even recorded a second first down. By that time, Landry had hit 15 of his first 17 pass attempts, including a 23-yard touchdown pass to Trumaine Johnson. McQuilken had a horrible debut as the Federals quarterback, and was replaced by back-up Hohensee; Hohensee accounted for the Federals only score, a 19-yard pass to Walker Lee. (The only positive was the attendance of 38,007; unfortunately, this was more than double what the Feds would draw in any of their 17 other games played in Washington.

== Personnel ==
=== Staff ===
1983 Washington Federals staff
| Front office: Owner – Berl Bernhard; General manager – Ray Jauch; Head coaches: Head coach – Ray Jauch; Offensive coaches: Offensive Coordinator - Dick Bielski; Quarterbacks – Dick Bielski; Wide receivers – Dick Bielski; Tight ends – Dick Bielski; Offensive line – Bruce Beatty | Defensive coaches: Defensive Coordinator - Leo McKillip; Defensive line – Gene Stauber; Linebackers – Ted Vactor; Defensive backs – Ted Vactor; Special teams coaches: Special teams coordinator – Ted Vactor/Bruce Beatty |

=== Roster ===
1983 Washington Federals roster
| Quarterbacks (QB): 9 Mike Hohensee; 11 Kim McQuilken; Running backs (RB): 23 Curtis Bledsoe; 35 Rickey Claitt; 32 Craig James; 40 Eric Robinson; 38 Billy Taylor; Wide receivers (WR): 86 Charles Chisley; 82 Mike Harris; 80 Mike Fisher; 88 Jeff Postell; 89 Stan Rome; Tight ends (TE): 83 Vince Rogusky | Offensive linemen (OL): 52 Bruce Byrom C/G; 66 Vaughn Harman G; 75 Myke Horton G; 57 Tony Loia C/G/T; 71 Mike Matocha G; 60 Dave Pacella G/T; 69 Joel Patten T; 72 LeRoy Robinson T/G; 77 Jeff Sevy T; 67 Mike Wilson G; Defensive linemen (DL): 79 Coy Bacon DE; 90 Bob Barber DE; 74 Bob Cobb DE; 78 Ronnie Estay DT; 63 Eddie Jackson DT; 93 Richard Murray DE; 92 Bennie Smith DT; 76 Tony Suber DT | Linebackers (LB): 50 Ed Baxley MLB; 58 Mike Corvino OLB; 56 Scott Facyson MLB; 55 Joe Harris OLB; Defensive backs (DB): 36 Jeff Brown CB; 28 Gregg Butler CB; 21 Doug Greene SS; 44 Mike Guess FS; 26 Don Harris S; 24 Willie Holly CB; 43 Mike Hurst FS; 33 Anthony Watson SS; Special teams (ST): 3 Dana Moore P/K; 6 Sandro Vitiello K | Practice squad: -- Mike Forsland QB; 10 Joe Gilliam QB; 84 Mike Holmes WR; 39 James Mayberry RB; 51 Mike Muller LB; 54 Kevin Patterson LB; 87 Joey Walters WR; Reserve: -- Brian Butcher G (Exempt); 22 Buddy Hardeman RB (IR); 20 Victor Jackson S (IR); 81 Vince Kenney WR (IR); 59 Jeff McIntyre LB (IR); 53 Brian Musselman C/G (IR); 80 Reggie Smith WR (IR); 67 Tony Vitale G (IR); Rookies in italics |

== USFL draft ==
| Round | Pick | Player | Position | School |
|---|---|---|---|---|
| 1 | 4 | Craig James | Running Back | SMU |
| 2 | 21 | Tim Lewis | Defensive Back | Pittsburgh |
| 3 | 28 | Stephen Starring | Quarterback | McNeese State |
| 4 | 45 | Bob Winckler | Offensive Tackle | Wisconsin |
| 5 | 50 | Mike Hohensee | Quarterback | Minnesota |
| 5 | 54 | Doug Howard | Offensive Tackle | North Carolina State |
| 5 | 57 | Brett Miller | Offensive Tackle | Iowa |
| 6 | 63 | George Parker | Running Back | Norfolk State |
| 7 | 76 | Perry Williams | Defensive Back | North Carolina State |
| 10 | 114 | Jeff Nyce | Center | North Carolina State |
| 10 | 117 | Dennis Fowlkes | Linebacker | West Virginia |
| 11 | 124 | Kiki DeAyala | Linebacker | Texas |
| 11 | 130 | Steve Bird | Wide Receiver | Eastern Kentucky |
| 12 | 141 | Dee Dee Hoggard | Defensive Back | North Carolina State |
| 13 | 148 | William Wall | Tight End | Virginia Union |
| 14 | 165 | Jody Schulz | Linebacker | East Carolina |

== Schedule ==
| Week | Date | Opponent | Result | Record | Venue | Attendance |
|---|---|---|---|---|---|---|
| 1 | March 6 | Chicago Blitz | L 7–28 | 0–1 | RFK Stadium | 38,007 |
| 2 | March 14 | at Los Angeles Express | L 3–20 | 0–2 | Los Angeles Memorial Coliseum | 22,453 |
| 3 | March 20 | at Boston Breakers | L 16–19 | 0–3 | Nickerson Field | 18,430 |
| 4 | March 27 | Michigan Panthers | W 22–16 (OT) | 1–3 | RFK Stadium | 11,404 |
| 5 | April 3 | at Philadelphia Stars | L 3–34 | 1–4 | Veterans Stadium | 14,576 |
| 6 | April 11 | Arizona Wranglers | L 21–22 | 1–5 | RFK Stadium | 13,936 |
| 7 | April 17 | at New Jersey Generals | L 22–23 | 1–6 | Giants Stadium | 35,381 |
| 8 | April 24 | Tampa Bay Bandits | L 23–30 | 1–7 | RFK Stadium | 9,070 |
| 9 | May 1 | Birmingham Stallions | L 3–35 | 1–8 | RFK Stadium | 12,818 |
| 10 | May 8 | at Chicago Blitz | L 3–31 | 1–9 | Soldier Field | 11,300 |
| 11 | May 16 | at Oakland Invaders | L 24–31 | 1–10 | Oakland-Alameda County Coliseum | 25,900 |
| 12 | May 22 | Boston Breakers | L 14–21 | 1–11 | RFK Stadium | 33,812 |
| 13 | May 29 | New Jersey Generals | L 29–32 | 1–12 | RFK Stadium | 11,264 |
| 14 | June 3 | at Denver Gold | L 12–24 | 1–13 | Mile High Stadium | 40,671 |
| 15 | June 11 | at Arizona Wranglers | W 18–11 | 2–13 | Sun Devil Stadium | 16,656 |
| 16 | June 20 | at Michigan Panthers | L 25–27 | 2–14 | Pontiac Silverdome | 26,418 |
| 17 | June 26 | Los Angeles Express | W 28–21 | 3–14 | RFK Stadium | 9,792 |
| 18 | July 3 | Philadelphia Stars | W 21–14 | 4–14 | RFK Stadium | 11,039 |

== Standings ==
USFL Atlantic Division
| | W | L | T | PCT | DIV | PF | PA | STK |
|---|---|---|---|---|---|---|---|---|
| Philadelphia Stars | 15 | 3 | 0 | .833 | 4–2 | 379 | 204 | L1 |
| Boston Breakers | 11 | 7 | 0 | .611 | 5–1 | 399 | 334 | W1 |
| New Jersey Generals | 6 | 12 | 0 | .333 | 2–4 | 314 | 437 | L1 |
| Washington Federals | 4 | 14 | 0 | .222 | 1–5 | 297 | 422 | W2 |

== Awards ==
| Award | Winner | Position |
|---|---|---|
| All-USFL Team | Eric Robinson | RB/KR |

== Final statistics ==
=== Offense ===
Federals Passing
| | C/ATT | Yds | TD | INT |
|---|---|---|---|---|
| Kim McQuilken | 188/334 | 1912 | 7 | 14 |
| Mike Hohensee | 92/190 | 1017 | 9 | 7 |
| Joe Gilliam | 40/102 | 673 | 5 | 12 |
Federals Rushing
| | Car | Yds | TD | LG |
| Craig James | 202 | 823 | 4 | 24 |
| Billy Taylor | 171 | 757 | 5 | 34 |
| Curtis Bledsoe | 26 | 133 | 0 | 31 |
| James Mayberry | 42 | 120 | 2 | 11 |
| Eric Robinson | 49 | 97 | 0 | 8 |
| Mike Hohensee | 19 | 73 | 0 | 19 |
| Kim McQuilken | 13 | 9 | 1 | 7 |
| Rickey Claitt | 1 | 1 | 0 | 1 |
| Buddy Hardeman | 3 | –3 | 0 | 4 |
| Joe Gilliam | 3 | –6 | 0 | 0 |
| Dana Moore | 1 | –8 | 0 | –8 |
Federals Receiving
| | Rec | Yds | TD | LG |
| Billy Taylor | 64 | 523 | 2 | 55 |
| Joey Walters | 63 | 959 | 6 | 42 |
| Craig James | 40 | 342 | 3 | 52 |
| Mike Holmes | 35 | 654 | 7 | 80 |
| Mike Harris | 26 | 441 | 2 | 42 |
| Eric Robinson | 18 | 172 | 0 | 20 |
| Buddy Hardeman | 18 | 114 | 0 | 16 |
| Stan Rome | 12 | 157 | 1 | 26 |
| Vince Kenney | 7 | 120 | 0 | 30 |
| Reggie Smith | 6 | 87 | 0 | 22 |
| James Mayberry | 5 | 14 | 0 | 6 |
| Vince Rogusky | 4 | 47 | 0 | 20 |
| Jeff Postell | 4 | 32 | 0 | 9 |
| Curtis Bledsoe | 4 | 25 | 0 | 8 |
| Charles Chisley | 3 | 47 | 0 | 30 |
| Bubba Diggs | 3 | 19 | 0 | 8 |
| Walker Lee | 2 | 32 | 1 | 19 |
| Rickey Claitt | 2 | 27 | 0 | 14 |
| William Wall | 2 | 20 | 0 | 11 |
| Tony Samuels | 1 | 30 | 0 | 30 |
| Marc Brown | 1 | 18 | 0 | 18 |
| Tony Loia | 0 | 2 | 0 | 2 |

=== Defense ===
Federals Sacks
| | Sacks |
|---|---|
| Bennie Smith | 7.0 |
| Coy Bacon | 7.0 |
| Ronnie Estay | 6.5 |
| Bob Barber | 5.0 |
| Tony Suber | 4.0 |
| Mike Corvino | 2.5 |
| Joe Harris | 2.5 |
| Drew Taylor | 2.5 |
| Jeff McIntyre | 1.5 |
| Mike Muller | 1.0 |
| Robert Cobb | 1.0 |
| Mike Guess | 1.0 |
| Bob Shupryt | 1.0 |
| Doug Greene | 1.0 |
| Eddie Jackson | 0.5 |
| Don Harris | 0.5 |

Federals Interceptions
| | Int | Yds | TD | LG | PD |
|---|---|---|---|---|---|
| Doug Greene | 9 | 121 | 1 | 35 | |
| Jeff Brown | 6 | 27 | 0 | 22 | |
| Mike Guess | 5 | 49 | 0 | 18 | |
| Gregg Butler | 2 | 25 | 0 | 14 | |
| Donnie Harris | 1 | 12 | 0 | 12 | |
| Mike Corvino | 1 | 2 | 0 | 2 | |
| Scott Facyson | 1 | 0 | 0 | 0 | |

Federals Fumbles
| | FF | Fmb | FR | Yds | TD |
|---|---|---|---|---|---|
| Kim McQuilken | | 11 | 6 | –12 | 0 |
| Billy Taylor | | 6 | 1 | 0 | 0 |
| Craig James | | 6 | 0 | 0 | 0 |
| Mike Hohensee | | 5 | 3 | 0 | 0 |
| Eric Robinson | | 4 | 1 | 0 | 0 |
| Mike Harris | | 3 | 1 | 0 | 0 |
| Joe Gilliam | | 2 | 3 | 0 | 0 |
| Mike Guess | | 2 | 2 | 0 | 0 |
| Jeff Postell | | 1 | 1 | 0 | 0 |
| Rickey Claitt | | 1 | 1 | 0 | 0 |
| Gregg Butler | | 1 | 1 | 0 | 0 |
| Curtis Bledsoe | | 1 | 1 | 0 | 0 |
| Charles Chisley | | 1 | 0 | 0 | 0 |
| James Mayberry | | 1 | 0 | 0 | 0 |
| Steve Hoffman | | 1 | 0 | 0 | 0 |
| Eric Sanford | | 1 | 0 | 0 | 0 |

=== Special teams ===
Federals Kicking
| | FGM–FGA | XPM–XPA |
|---|---|---|
| Sandro Vitiello | 10-17 | 14-17 |

Federals Punting
| | Pnt | Yds | Lng | Blck |
|---|---|---|---|---|
| Dana Moore | 86 | 3480 | 60 | 0 |
| Steve Hoffman | 15 | 542 | 49 | 0 |

Federals Kick Returns
| | Ret | Yds | TD | Lng |
|---|---|---|---|---|
| Eric Robinson | 21 | 609 | 1 | 94 |
| Mike Guess | 22 | 486 | 0 | 55 |
| Mike Harris | 15 | 365 | 0 | 71 |
| Curtis Bledsoe | 7 | 109 | 0 | 32 |
| Reggie Smith | 5 | 81 | 0 | 31 |
| Louie Giammona | 3 | 66 | 0 | 24 |
| Mike Muller | 2 | 34 | 0 | 19 |
| Mike Corvino | 3 | 31 | 0 | 13 |
| Joey Walters | 1 | 20 | 0 | 20 |
| Rickey Claitt | 1 | 13 | 0 | 13 |
| Kevin McLain | 1 | 12 | 0 | 12 |
| Mike Hurst | 1 | 4 | 0 | 4 |
| Bob Shupryt | 1 | 3 | 0 | 3 |

Federals Punt Returns
| | Ret | Yds | TD | Lng |
|---|---|---|---|---|
| Eric Robinson | 24 | 171 | 0 | 29 |
| Mike Guess | 7 | 62 | 0 | 43 |
| Gregg Butler | 8 | 39 | 0 | 11 |
| Buddy Hardeman | 5 | 32 | 0 | 17 |
| Reggie Smith | 2 | 20 | 0 | 13 |
| Mike Harris | 1 | 0 | 0 | 0 |
| Jeff Postell | 1 | 0 | 0 | 0 |
