= 1983 Chicago Blitz season =

Defunct football team in the USFL

- Owner: Ted Diethrich
- General manager: Bruce Allen
- Head coach: George Allen
- Home stadium: Soldier Field

Results
- Record: 12–6
- Division place: 2nd Central Division
- Playoffs: Lost Divisional Playoffs (vs. Stars) 38-44 (OT)

The 1983 season was inaugural season for the Chicago Blitz in the United States Football League, and under head coach George Allen. The team finished with a 12–6 record.

== Background ==
The Blitz finished in a tie for the Central Division title with the Michigan Panthers. However, the Panthers were awarded the division title after sweeping the Blitz in the regular season, and would go on to become the league's first champions. In the playoffs, the Blitz blew a 21-point lead over the Philadelphia Stars, losing 44–38 in overtime.

== Schedule ==
Week	Date	Opponent	Result	Record	Venue	Attendance
1	March 6	at Washington Federals	W 28–7	1–0	RFK Stadium	38,007
2	March 12	at Arizona Wranglers	L 29–30	1–1	Sun Devil Stadium	28,434
3	March 20	Denver Gold	L 13–16	1–2	Soldier Field	22,600
4	March 27	Los Angeles Express	W 20–14	2–2	Soldier Field	10,936
5	April 2	at Tampa Bay Bandits	W 42–3	3–2	Tampa Stadium	46,585
6	April 10	Birmingham Stallions	W 22–11	4–2	Soldier Field	13,859
7	April 17	at Michigan Panthers	L 12–17	4–3	Pontiac Silverdome	11,634
8	April 25	New Jersey Generals	W 17–14 (OT)	5–3	Soldier Field	32,184
9	May 1	at Los Angeles Express	W 38–17	6–3	Los Angeles Memorial Coliseum	21,123
10	May 8	Washington Federals	W 31–3	7–3	Soldier Field	11,303
11	May 15	at Philadelphia Stars	L 24–31	7–4	Veterans Stadium	20,931
12	May 22	at New Jersey Generals	W 19–13 (OT)	8–4	Giants Stadium	33,812
13	May 30	Arizona Wranglers	W 36–11	9–4	Soldier Field	13,952
14	June 6	at Boston Breakers	L 15–21	9–5	Nickerson Field	15,087
15	June 12	Tampa Bay Bandits	W 31–8	10–5	Soldier Field	21,249
16	June 17	at Birmingham Stallions	W 29–14	11–5	Legion Field	22,500
17	June 26	Michigan Panthers	L 19–34	11–6	Soldier Field	25,041
18	July 3	Oakland Invaders	W 31–7	12–6	Soldier Field	12,346

=== Playoffs ===
Round	Date	Opponent	Result	Record	Venue	Attendance
Divisional	July 9	Philadelphia Stars	L 38–44 (OT)	0–1	Veterans Stadium	15,684

== Standings ==
USFL Central Division
	W	L	T	PCT	DIV	PF	PA	STK
Michigan Panthers	12	6	0	.667	4–2	451	337	W4
Chicago Blitz	12	6	0	.667	4–2	456	271	W1
Tampa Bay Bandits	11	7	0	.611	2–4	363	378	L1
Birmingham Stallions	9	9	0	.500	2–4	343	326	W1

== Roster ==
1983 Chicago Blitz roster
Quarterbacks: 14 Tim Koegel; 11 Greg Landry; 8 Tom Porras; 15 Tom Rozantz; 10 Bobby Scott; Running backs: 43 Mack Boatner FB; 34 Frank Collins; 21 Doug Dennison; 31 Walt Easley FB; 48 Kevin Long FB; 34 Walter Poole; 46 Tim Spencer; 42 Jim Stone; Wide receivers: 80 Marcus Anderson; 88 Wamon Buggs; 82 Larry Douglas; 2 Trumaine Johnson; 89 Lenny Willis; Tight ends: 84 Doug Cozen; 86 Paul Ricker; 81 Tim Wrightman	Offensive linemen: 54 Robert Barnes G; 59 Bruce Branch G; 78 Nick Eyre T; 66 Tim James; 50 Jack Lafferty; 62 Jim Lohmann T; 59 James Looney; 66 Bill McClung G; 79 Bob Newton G; 68 Tim Norman G; 65 Wally Pesuit C; 59 Tom Piette C; 73 Mark Stevenson G; 75 Rob Taylor T; 61 Tom Thayer G; 50 Steve Tobin; 69 Kari Yli-Renko T; Defensive linemen: 77 Junior Ah You DE; 63 Mark Buben DE; 72 Bob Cobb DE; 74 Joe Ehrmann DT; 76 Ken Gillen DE; 70 Kit Lathrop DT; 64 John Lee DE; 71 Karl Lorch DE; 79 Troy Thomas DT	Linebackers: 59 Tim Darling; 55 Jim Fahnhorst; 51 Joe Federspiel; 57 Doak Field; 58 Bruce Gheesling; 53 Andrew Melontree; 56 Ed Smith; 52 Stan White; Defensive backs: 32 Carl Allen CB; 27 Luther Bradley FS; 25 Eddie Brown SS; 24 Virgil Livers CB; 1 Frank Minnifield CB; 28 Don Schwartz SS; 37 Pat Schmidt SS; 22 Lance Shields CB; 20 Maurice Tyler CB; Special teams: 3 Frank Corral K/P; 5 Frank Garcia P; 7 John Roveto K
