= Truvillion =

Truvillion is a surname. Notable people with the surname include:

- Eric Truvillion (born 1959), American football player
- Tobias Truvillion (born 1975), American actor
- Troy Truvillion (born 1968), American basketball player
