= 1988 Minnesota Vikings season =

NFL team season

- General manager: Mike Lynn
- Head coach: Jerry Burns
- Offensive coordinator: Bob Schnelker
- Defensive coordinator: Floyd Peters
- Home stadium: Metrodome

Results
- Record: 11–5
- Division place: 2nd NFC Central
- Playoffs: Won Wild Card Playoffs (vs. Rams) 28–17; Lost Divisional Playoffs (at 49ers) 9–34
- All-Pros: S Joey Browner (1st team); CB Carl Lee (1st team); DT Keith Millard (1st team); T Gary Zimmerman (1st team)
- Pro Bowlers: S Joey Browner; WR Anthony Carter; DE Chris Doleman; TE Steve Jordan; CB Carl Lee; DT Keith Millard; LB Scott Studwell; QB Wade Wilson; T Gary Zimmerman

Uniform
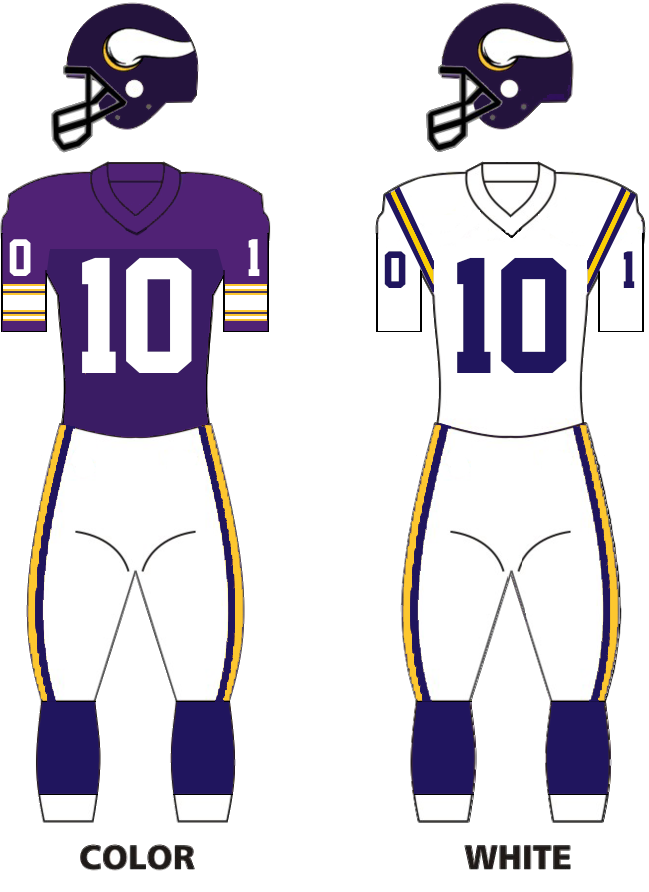

The 1988 season was the Minnesota Vikings' 28th in the National Football League. They finished with an 11–5 record, and finished second to the Chicago Bears in the NFC Central division.

The Vikings had one of the best defenses in the NFL in 1988. The team allowed 4,091 total yards, 4.3 yards per play, and 243 first downs, all best in the league. The Vikings also had a league-best 53 takeaways. Opposing quarterbacks had a league-worst 41.2 passer rating against the Vikings' defense, the lowest total of the 1980s and fifth all-time for the Super Bowl era.

The Vikings made the postseason for the second consecutive time under coach Jerry Burns. They defeated the Los Angeles Rams 28–17 in the wildcard round, but lost 34–9 in the divisional round to the San Francisco 49ers, who went on to win their third Super Bowl. This was the last time the Vikings won a playoff game until 1997.

== Offseason ==
=== 1988 draft ===
Hall of Famer

1988 Minnesota Vikings Draft
Draft order		Player name	Position	College	Notes
Round	Selection	Player name	Position	College	Notes
1	19	Randall McDaniel	Guard	Arizona State	
2	45	Traded to the Denver Broncos (Note: The Vikings traded their second-round selection (45th overall) to the Broncos in exchange for the second-, fourth- and sixth-round selections (54th, 108th and 164th overall).)			
2	54	Brad Edwards	Safety	South Carolina	From Broncos
3	71	Al Noga	Defensive end	Hawaii	
4	97	Traded to the New England Patriots (Note: The Vikings traded their fourth- and 11th-round selections (97th and 294th overall) to the Patriots in exchange for QB Rich Gannon.)			
4	108	Todd Kalis	Guard	Arizona State	From Broncos
5	124	Darrell Fullington	Safety	Miami (FL)	
6	156	Traded to the Miami Dolphins (Note: The Vikings traded their sixth-round selection (156th overall) and a 1989 10th-round selection (275th overall) to the Dolphins for OT Greg Koch.)			
6	164	Derrick White	Defensive back	Oklahoma	From Broncos
7	183	Brad Beckman	Tight end	Nebraska–Omaha	
8	210	Joe Cain	Linebacker	Oregon Tech	
9	237	Paul McGowan	Linebacker	Florida State	
10	264	Brian Habib	Offensive tackle	Washington	
11	296	Norman Floyd	Safety	South Carolina	From Vikings, via Patriots (Note: The Vikings traded their 1989 ninth-round selection to the Patriots in exchange for the 11th-round selection that New England received in the Gannon trade (296th overall).)
12	323	Traded to the New York Giants (Note: The Vikings traded their 12th-round selection (323rd overall) to the Giants in exchange for C Chris Foote.)			

==== Supplemental draft ====
Round	Name	Position	College	Notes
5	Ryan Bethea	Defensive back	South Carolina	Resulted in forfeiture of 1989 fifth-round selection.

=== Undrafted free agents ===
1988 undrafted free agents of note
Player	Position	College
Bob Furlong	Guard	Wisconsin–Stevens Point
Mike Greenfield	Quarterback	Northwestern
Darryl Harris	Running back	Arizona State
Van Sheppard	Wide receiver	Nebraska
Reggie Ward	Wide receiver	Notre Dame

== Staff ==
1988 Minnesota Vikings staff
Front office: President – Wheelock Whitney, Jr.; General manager – Mike Lynn; Head coaches: Head coach – Jerry Burns; Offensive coaches: Offensive coordinator – Bob Schnelker; Receivers – Dick Rehbein; Offensive assistant/wide receivers – Jerry Brown; Running backs – John Brunner; Offensive line – John Michels	Defensive coaches: Defensive coordinator – Floyd Peters; Defensive line – Paul Wiggin; Linebackers – Monte Kiffin; Defensive backs – Pete Carroll; Special teams coaches: Special teams/tight ends – Tom Batta

== Roster ==
1988 Minnesota Vikings roster
Quarterbacks (QB): 16 Rich Gannon; 9 Tommy Kramer; 11 Wade Wilson; Running backs (RB): 46 Alfred Anderson FB; 42 D. J. Dozier; 31 Rick Fenney FB; 32 Darryl Harris KR; 20 Darrin Nelson; 36 Allen Rice; Wide receivers (WR): 81 Anthony Carter; 80 Jim Gustafson; 84 Hassan Jones; 87 Leo Lewis PR; Tight ends (TE): 82 Carl Hilton; 83 Steve Jordan; 86 Mike Mularkey	Offensive linemen (OL): 62 Chris Foote C; 76 Tim Irwin T; 69 Todd Kalis G; 63 Kirk Lowdermilk C; 64 Randall McDaniel G; 52 Randy Rasmussen C/G; 66 Terry Tausch G; 65 Gary Zimmerman T; Defensive linemen (DL): 60 Al Baker DE; 78 Barry Bennett DT; 56 Chris Doleman DE; 73 Stafford Mays DT; 75 Keith Millard DT; 96 Tim Newton DT; 99 Al Noga DE; 97 Henry Thomas DT	Linebackers (LB): 58 Walker Lee Ashley MLB; 50 Ray Berry OLB; 51 David Howard OLB; 54 Jesse Solomon OLB; 55 Scott Studwell MLB; Defensive backs (DB): 47 Joey Browner SS; 27 Brad Edwards FS; 29 Darrell Fullington FS; 44 John Harris FS; 24 Wymon Henderson CB; 30 Issiac Holt CB; 39 Carl Lee CB; 48 Reggie Rutland CB; Special teams (ST): 1 Chuck Nelson K; 13 Bucky Scribner P	Practice squad None Reserve: -- Norman Floyd S (IR); 74 Brian Habib G (IR); 72 Dave Huffman G (IR); 79 Doug Martin DE (IR); Rookies in italics 47 active, 4 reserve

== Preseason ==
Week	Date	Opponent	Result	Record	Venue	Attendance	Notes
1	August 7	New Orleans Saints	L 20–23	0–1	Hubert H. Humphrey Metrodome	47,624	
2	August 14	Chicago Bears	W 28–21	1–1	Ullevi Stadium (Gothenburg, Sweden)	33,115	Volvo American Football Classic
3	August 21	at Phoenix Cardinals	W 19–16 (OT)	2–1	Sun Devil Stadium	45,429	
4	August 26	Miami Dolphins	W 24–17	3–1	Hubert H. Humphrey Metrodome	51,463	

== Regular season ==
=== Schedule ===
Week	Date	Opponent	Result	Record	Venue	Attendance
1	September 4	at Buffalo Bills	L 10–13	0–1	Rich Stadium	76,783
2	September 11	New England Patriots	W 36–6	1–1	Hubert H. Humphrey Metrodome	55,545
3	September 18	at Chicago Bears	W 31–7	2–1	Soldier Field	63,990
4	September 25	Philadelphia Eagles	W 23–21	3–1	Hubert H. Humphrey Metrodome	56,012
5	October 2	at Miami Dolphins	L 7–24	3–2	Joe Robbie Stadium	59,867
6	October 9	Tampa Bay Buccaneers	W 14–13	4–2	Hubert H. Humphrey Metrodome	55,274
7	October 16	Green Bay Packers	L 14–34	4–3	Hubert H. Humphrey Metrodome	59,053
8	October 23	at Tampa Bay Buccaneers	W 49–20	5–3	Tampa Stadium	48,020
9	October 30	at San Francisco 49ers	L 21–24	5–4	Candlestick Park	60,738
10	November 6	Detroit Lions	W 44–17	6–4	Hubert H. Humphrey Metrodome	55,573
11	November 13	at Dallas Cowboys	W 43–3	7–4	Texas Stadium	57,830
12	November 20	Indianapolis Colts	W 12–3	8–4	Hubert H. Humphrey Metrodome	58,342
13	November 24	at Detroit Lions	W 23–0	9–4	Silverdome	46,379
14	December 4	New Orleans Saints	W 45–3	10–4	Hubert H. Humphrey Metrodome	61,215
15	December 11	at Green Bay Packers	L 6–18	10–5	Lambeau Field	48,892
16	December 19	Chicago Bears	W 28–27	11–5	Hubert H. Humphrey Metrodome	62,067

=== Game summaries ===
==== Week 5: at Miami Dolphins ====
Week 5: Minnesota Vikings at Miami Dolphins – Game summary

Quarter	1	2	3	4	Total
Vikings	0	0	0	7	7
Dolphins	0	17	7	0	24

at Joe Robbie Stadium, Miami, Florida

- Date: October 2
- Game time: 4:00 p.m. EST
- Game weather: 88 °F (31 °C)
- Game attendance: 59,867
- Referee: Jerry Markbreit (9)
- TV announcers (CBS): Dick Stockton and Dan Fouts
- Pro-Football-Reference

Game information

First quarter

- No scoring plays.

Second quarter

- MIA – Fuad Reveiz 38-yard field goal. Dolphins 3–0.
- MIA – Jim Jensen 3-yard pass from Dan Marino (Fuad Reveiz kick). Dolphins 10–0.
- MIA – Lorenzo Hampton 1-yard pass from Dan Marino (Fuad Reveiz kick). Dolphins 17–0.

Third quarter

- MIA – Lorenzo Hampton 5-yard pass from Dan Marino (Fuad Reveiz kick). Dolphins 24–0.

Fourth quarter

- MIN – Carl Lee 48-yard interception return (Chuck Nelson kick). Dolphins 24–7.

Top passers

- MIN – Tommy Kramer – 13/33, 220 yards, 4 INT
- MIA – Dan Marino – 20/37, 264 yards, 2 TD, 3 INT

Top rushers

- MIN – Allen Rice – 4 rushes, 20 yards
- MIA – Troy Stradford – 7 rushes, 42 yards

Top receivers

- MIN – Anthony Carter – 4 receptions, 92 yards
- MIA – Mark Duper – 6 receptions, 81 yards

==== Week 11: at Dallas Cowboys ====
Week 11: Minnesota Vikings at Dallas Cowboys – Game summary

Quarter	1	2	3	4	Total
Vikings	17	0	17	9	43
Cowboys	0	3	0	0	3

at Texas Stadium, Irving, Texas

- Date: November 13
- Game time: 7:00 p.m.
- Game weather: 59 °F (15 °C)
- Game attendance: 57,830
- Pro-Football-Reference.com

Game information

First quarter

- MIN – Hassan Jones 26-yard pass from Wade Wilson (Chuck Nelson kick). Vikings 7–0.
- MIN – Henry Thomas 2-yard fumble return (Chuck Nelson kick). Vikings 14–0.
- MIN – Chuck Nelson 39-yard field goal. Vikings 17–0.

Second quarter

- DAL – Roger Ruzek 50-yard field goal. Vikings 17–3.

Third quarter

- MIN – Hassan Jones 64-yard pass from Wade Wilson (Chuck Nelson kick). Vikings 24–3.
- MIN – Chuck Nelson 27-yard field goal. Vikings 27–3.
- MIN – Steve Jordan 3-yard pass from Wade Wilson (Chuck Nelson kick). Vikings 34–3.

Fourth quarter

- MIN – D. J. Dozier 19-yard run (Chuck Nelson kick). Vikings 41–3.
- MIN – Kevin Sweeney tackled by Al Baker in the end zone for a safety. Vikings 43–3.

Top passers

- MIN – Wade Wilson – 12/27, 240 yards, 3 TD, INT
- DAL – Kevin Sweeney – 10/28, 93 yards, 4 INT

Top rushers

- MIN – D. J. Dozier – 4 rushes, 36 yards, TD
- DAL – Herschel Walker – 21 rushes, 86 yards

Top receivers

- MIN – Hassan Jones – 3 receptions, 132 yards, 2 TD
- DAL – Michael Irvin – 2 receptions, 42 yards

=== Standings ===
NFC Central
	W	L	T	PCT	DIV	CONF	PF	PA	STK
Chicago Bears^{(1)}	12	4	0	.750	6–2	9–3	312	215	L1
Minnesota Vikings^{(4)}	11	5	0	.688	6–2	9–3	406	233	W1
Tampa Bay Buccaneers	5	11	0	.313	4–4	4–8	261	350	W1
Detroit Lions	4	12	0	.250	2–6	3–11	220	315	L2
Green Bay Packers	4	12	0	.250	2–6	3–9	240	313	W2

== Playoffs ==
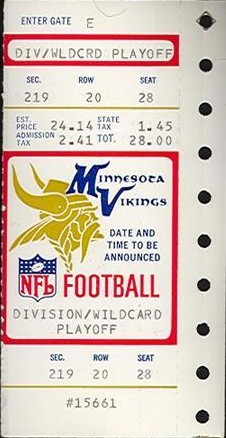
A ticket for the 1988 NFC Wildcard Game between the Vikings and the Rams

=== Schedule ===
Week	Date	Opponent (seed)	Result	Record	Venue	Attendance
Wild Card	December 26	Los Angeles Rams (5)	W 28–17	1–0	Hubert H. Humphrey Metrodome	57,666
Divisional	January 1	at San Francisco 49ers (2)	L 9–34	1–1	Candlestick Park	61,848

=== Game summaries ===
==== NFC Wild Card: vs. (#5) Los Angeles Rams ====
NFC Wild Card Playoff: (#5) Los Angeles Rams at (#4) Minnesota Vikings – Game summary

Quarter	1	2	3	4	Total
Rams	0	7	3	7	17
Vikings	14	0	7	7	28

at Hubert H. Humphrey Metrodome, Minneapolis, Minnesota

- Date: December 26, 1988
- Game time: 2:30 p.m. EST/1:30 p.m. CST
- Game attendance: 57,666
- Referee: Dick Hantak
- TV announcers (CBS): Pat Summerall (play-by-play) and John Madden (color commentator)
- Pro-Football-Reference.com

Game information

First quarter

- MIN – Alfred Anderson 7-yard run (Chuck Nelson kick). Vikings 7–0.
- MIN – Allen Rice 17-yard run (Chuck Nelson kick). Vikings 14–0.

Second quarter

- LAR – Damone Johnson 3-yard pass from Jim Everett (Mike Lansford kick). Vikings 14–7.

Third quarter

- MIN – Alfred Anderson 1-yard run (Chuck Nelson kick). Vikings 21–7.
- LAR – Mike Lansford 33-yard field goal. Vikings 21–10.

Fourth quarter

- MIN – Carl Hilton 5-yard pass from Wade Wilson (Chuck Nelson kick). Vikings 28–10.
- LAR – Pete Holohan 11-yard pass from Jim Everett (Mike Lansford kick). Vikings 28–17.

Top passers

- LAR – Jim Everett – 19/45, 247 yards, 2 TD, 3 INT
- MIN – Wade Wilson – 17/28, 253 yards, TD

Top rushers

- LAR – Greg Bell – 17 rushes, 91 yards
- MIN – Allen Rice – 17 rushes, 79 yards, TD

Top receivers

- LAR – Henry Ellard – 4 receptions, 54 yards
- MIN – Anthony Carter – 4 receptions, 102 yards

==== NFC Divisional Playoffs: at (#2) San Francisco 49ers ====
NFC Divisional Playoff: (#4) Minnesota Vikings at (#2) San Francisco 49ers – Game summary

Quarter	1	2	3	4	Total
Vikings	3	0	6	0	9
49ers	7	14	0	13	34

at Candlestick Park, San Francisco

- Date: January 1, 1989
- Game time: 4:00 p.m. EST/1:00 p.m. PST
- Game attendance: 61,848
- Referee: Jerry Markbreit
- TV announcers (CBS): Pat Summerall and John Madden
- Pro-Football-Reference.com

Game information

First quarter

- MIN – Chuck Nelson 47-yard field goal. Vikings 3–0.
- SF – Jerry Rice 2-yard pass from Joe Montana (Mike Cofer kick) 49ers 7–3.

Second quarter

- SF – Jerry Rice 4-yard pass from Joe Montana (Mike Cofer kick). 49ers 14–3.
- SF – Jerry Rice 11-yard pass from Joe Montana (Mike Cofer kick). 49ers 21–3.

Third quarter

- MIN – Hassan Jones 5-yard pass from Wade Wilson (kick failed). 49ers 21–9.

Fourth quarter

- SF – Roger Craig 4-yard run (Mike Cofer kick). 49ers 28–9.
- SF – Roger Craig 80-yard run (kick failed). 49ers 34–9.

Top passers

- MIN – Wade Wilson – 23/47, 255 yards, TD, 2 INT
- SF – Joe Montana – 16/27, 178 yards, 3 TD, INT

Top rushers

- MIN – Allen Rice – 5 rushes, 20 yards
- SF – Roger Craig – 21 rushes, 135 yards, 2 TD

Top receivers

- MIN – Hassan Jones – 7 receptions, 71 yards, TD
- SF – Jerry Rice – 5 receptions, 61 yards, 3 TD

== Statistics ==
=== Team leaders ===
Category	Player(s)	Value
Passing yards	Wade Wilson	2,746
Passing touchdowns	Wade Wilson	15
Rushing yards	Darrin Nelson	380
Rushing touchdowns	Alfred Anderson	7
Receiving yards	Anthony Carter	1,225
Receiving touchdowns	Anthony Carter	6
Points	Chuck Nelson	108
Kickoff return yards	Darryl Harris	833
Punt return yards	Leo Lewis	550 *
Tackles	Jesse Solomon	124
Sacks	Chris Doleman; Keith Millard	8.0
Interceptions	Carl Lee	8
Forced fumbles	Henry Thomas	4

* Vikings single season record

=== League rankings ===
Category	Total yards	Yards per game	NFL rank (out of 28)
Passing offense	3,789	236.8	4th
Rushing offense	1,806	112.9	20th
Total offense	5,595	349.7	7th
Passing defense	2,489	155.6	2nd
Rushing defense	1,602	100.1	5th
Total defense	4,091	255.7	1st
