= 1983 Oakland Invaders season =

Defunct football team in the USFL

- Head coach: John Ralston
- Home stadium: Oakland–Alameda County Coliseum

Results
- Record: 9–9
- Division place: 1st Pacific Division
- Playoffs: Lost Divisional to Panthers, 21–37

The 1983 season was the inaugural season for the Oakland Invaders in the United States Football League. The Generals were led by head coach John Ralston and finished with a 9–9 record.

== Schedule ==
Week	Date	Opponent	Result	Record	Venue	Attendance
1	March 6	at Arizona Wranglers	W 24–0	1–0	Sun Devil Stadium	45,167
2	March 13	Birmingham Stallions	L 14–20 (OT)	1–1	Oakland-Alameda County Coliseum	47,344
3	March 19	at Michigan Panthers	W 33–27	2–1	Pontiac Silverdome	28,952
4	March 28	at Denver Gold	L 12–22	2–2	Mile High Stadium	38,720
5	April 3	at Los Angeles Express	L 7–10	2–3	Los Angeles Memorial Coliseum	23,538
6	April 10	at Boston Breakers	W 26–7	3–3	Nickerson Field	7,984
7	April 16	Philadelphia Stars	L 7–17	3–4	Oakland-Alameda County Coliseum	34,901
8	April 24	at Birmingham Stallions	L 9–21	3–5	Legion Field	18,500
9	May 2	Arizona Wranglers	W 34–20	4–5	Oakland-Alameda County Coliseum	27,460
10	May 8	Tampa Bay Bandits	L 10–17	4–6	Oakland-Alameda County Coliseum	26,989
11	May 16	Washington Federals	W 34–27	5–6	Oakland-Alameda County Coliseum	25,900
12	May 21	at Tampa Bay Bandits	L 9–29	5–7	Tampa Stadium	43,389
13	May 29	Los Angeles Express	W 20–10	6–7	Oakland-Alameda County Coliseum	28,967
14	June 4	New Jersey Generals	W 34–21	7–7	Oakland-Alameda County Coliseum	32,908
15	June 13	Denver Gold	W 16–10	8–7	Oakland-Alameda County Coliseum	26,840
16	June 20	at Philadelphia Stars	L 6–12	8–8	Veterans Stadium	16,933
17	June 25	Boston Breakers	W 17–16	9–8	Oakland-Alameda County Coliseum	30,396
18	July 3	at Chicago Blitz	L 7–31	9–9	Soldier Field	12,346

== Playoffs ==
Week	Date	Opponent	Result	Record	Venue	Attendance
Divisional Playoff	July 10	at Michigan Panthers	L 21–37	0–1	Pontiac Silverdome	60,237

== Standings ==
USFL Pacific Division
	W	L	T	PCT	DIV	PF	PA	STK
Oakland Invaders	9	9	0	.500	4–2	319	319	W1
Los Angeles Express	8	10	0	.444	3–3	296	370	W1
Denver Gold	7	11	0	.389	2–4	284	304	L2
Arizona Wranglers	4	14	0	.222	2–4	261	442	L10
