= Eric Scoggins =

American football player (1959–2009)

No. 63, 51, 55
- Position: Linebacker

Personal information
- Born: January 23, 1959; Inglewood, California, U.S.
- Died: January 10, 2009 (aged 49); Tracy, California, U.S.
- Listed height: 6 ft 2 in (1.88 m)
- Listed weight: 235 lb (107 kg)

Career information
- High school: Inglewood
- College: USC
- NFL draft: 1981: 12th round, 315th overall pick

Career history
- Baltimore Colts (1981)*; Los Angeles Raiders (1982)*; San Francisco 49ers (1982); Los Angeles Express (1983); Houston Gamblers (1984); Denver Broncos (1985)*
- * Offseason or practice squad member only
- Stats at Pro Football Reference

Eric Thomas Scoggins (January 23, 1959 – January 10, 2009) was an American professional football player who was a linebacker for one season in the National Football League (NFL) for the San Francisco 49ers. Scoggins also played in the United States Football League (USFL) for the Los Angeles Express and Houston Gamblers.

He was diagnosed with ALS in January 2007 and died from the disease on January 10, 2009. He is one of at least 345 NFL players to be diagnosed after death with chronic traumatic encephalopathy (CTE), which is caused by repeated hits to the head.
