= Kevin Nelson =

Kevin Nelson may refer to:

- Kevin Nelson (broadcaster) (1959–2011), radio announcer and television reporter in Ottawa, Ontario, Canada
- Kevin Nelson (soccer) (born 1979), former Trinidadian footballer
