= Chris Foote (American football) =

American football player (born 1956)

No. 66, 62
- Position: Center

Personal information
- Born: December 2, 1956 (age 69); Louisville, Kentucky, U.S.
- Listed height: 6 ft 3 in (1.91 m)
- Listed weight: 256 lb (116 kg)

Career information
- High school: Fairview (Boulder, Colorado)
- College: USC
- NFL draft: 1980: 6th round, 144th overall pick

Career history
- Baltimore Colts (1980–1981); New York Giants (1982–1983); New York Jets (1983)*; Los Angeles Express (1984); Tampa Bay Bandits (1985); New York Giants (1987)*; Minnesota Vikings (1987–1991)
- * Offseason or practice squad member only

Awards and highlights
- National champion (1978); Second-team All-Pac-10 (1979)

Career NFL statistics
- Games played: 104
- Games started: 8
- Fumble recoveries: 1
- Stats at Pro Football Reference

Christopher D. Foote (born December 2, 1956) is an American former professional football player who was a center for 11 seasons in the National Football League (NFL) and the United States Football League (USFL). He was primarily a long snapper on punt teams during his NFL career.

He played college football for the USC Trojans, starting at center during their 1980 Rose Bowl championship season. He found his niche in professional football as a long snapper and special teams member.

In the NFL Foote spent two years each with the Baltimore Colts and New York Giants, finishing up with five years playing for the Minnesota Vikings. He retired from football in 1991.

== Biography ==
=== Early life ===
Chris Foote was born December 2, 1956, in Louisville, Kentucky. His family relocated to Boulder, Colorado, where he attended Fairview High School.

A wrestler and track and field participant in the power disciplines of shot put and discus during his high school years, it was as a football player that Foote excelled. He was named to the 50-member Parade Magazine High School All-American Team, listed at the offensive tackle and nose guard positions.

=== College career ===
Foote enrolled at the University of Southern California (USC), where he majored in Speech Communications. His time there was injury-wracked and he underwent no fewer than three operations to repair damage to his knees during his time at USC.

Foote finally got healthy during his senior year and started every game at center for the Trojans during the 1979 season — a year which culminated with a victory at the 1980 Rose Bowl.

After the 17–16 Rose Bowl win over Ohio State, Foote was effusive in praising his mates. "It was like so many other games this year, it was like at LSU, at Cal, at Washington — there's just that confidence we'll do it, no matter the situation," he told the Los Angeles Times. "Our offense is good at wearing people down. You can actually feel it over the course of a game. The linebacker's not stepping up as hard, or the lineman's not charging as hard.... We just wear them down."

=== Professional career ===
Foote was selected in the sixth round (144th overall) of the 1980 NFL draft by the Baltimore Colts.

He played for the Colts during the 1980 and 1981 seasons, finding a spot on the roster as the team's long snapper on punts. He played in all 16 of the Colts' games in the 1980 season without making a single errant snap, making 2 tackles and contributing 7 assists in punt coverage. He also made a fumble recovery in a late November game against the Buffalo Bills, setting up a scoring drive as part of a 28–24 victory.

Foote similarly saw action in every Colts game of the 1981 Colts season, making 2 tackles and 4 assists on coverage and downing two punts inside the 10-yard line. Foote was listed as a reserve center and guard on the team's depth chart during these years.

Foote was a member of the New York Giants in 1982 and 1983. In the 1982 season he played in 12 games for the Giants as long snapper, making 5 tackles and contributing 2 assists in punt coverage.

Foote moved to the United States Football League (USFL) in 1984, playing for the Los Angeles Express before moving to the Tampa Bay Bandits for the 1985 season.

He returned to the NFL to play for the Minnesota Vikings from 1987 to 1990. He saw action in 6 games during his first year with the team and played the full 16-game schedule in the 1988, 1989, and 1990 seasons. This includes 5 games in which he started at center in 1988 and 3 games in 1990, when he was impressed into duty by injuries.

=== Life after football ===
Foote retired from professional football after the 1990 season, at the age of 34.

During his playing career, Foote made his home in Laguna Hills, California, where he enjoyed playing golf, driving sports cars, and showing dogs.
