= Fred Nordgren =

American football player (born 1959)

No. 76
- Position: Defensive tackle

Personal information
- Born: December 11, 1959 (age 66); Hillsboro, Oregon, U.S.
- Listed height: 6 ft 0 in (1.83 m)
- Listed weight: 240 lb (109 kg)

Career information
- High school: Hillsboro
- College: Portland State
- NFL draft: 1982: undrafted

Career history
- Toronto Argonauts (1982); Tampa Bay Bandits (1983–1985); Tampa Bay Buccaneers (1987); Houston Oilers (1988)*
- * Offseason or practice squad member only
- Stats at Pro Football Reference

Frederic Marvin Nordgren (born December 11, 1959) is an American former professional football defensive tackle who played for the Tampa Bay Buccaneers of the National Football League (NFL). He played college football at Portland State University.

Nordgren also played for the Toronto Argonauts in the Canadian Football League (CFL) and for the Tampa Bay Bandits of the United States Football League (USFL); he also had a stint with the Houston Oilers. While with the Bandits in 1983, he was selected All-USFL after totaling 15 sacks and an interception returned for a touchdown.
