= Wilbert Haslip =

American football player (born 1956)

No. 34
- Position: Running back

Personal information
- Born: December 8, 1956 (age 69); El Centro, California, U.S.
- Listed height: 5 ft 11 in (1.80 m)
- Listed weight: 212 lb (96 kg)

Career information
- High school: Santa Ana (CA) Valley
- College: Hawaii
- NFL draft: 1979: 8th round, 210th overall pick

Career history
- Kansas City Chiefs (1979); Los Angeles Express (1983)

Career NFL statistics
- Rushing yards: 1
- Rushing average: 0.5
- Stats at Pro Football Reference

Wilbert Haslip (born December 8, 1956) is an American former professional football player who was a running back in the National Football League (NFL) and United States Football League (USFL). He played college football for the Hawaii Rainbow Warriors. He played in the NFL for the Kansas City Chiefs in 1979 and for the USFL's Los Angeles Express in 1983.
