= 1983 Arizona Wranglers season =

Defunct football team in the USFL

- Owner: Jim Joseph
- Head coach: Doug Shively
- Home stadium: Sun Devil Stadium

Results
- Record: 4–14
- Division place: 2nd Atlantic Division
- Playoffs: Did not qualify

The 1983 season was the inaugural season for the Arizona Wranglers in the United States Football League. The Wranglers were led by head coach Doug Shively and finished with a 4–14 record.

== USFL draft ==
Arizona Wranglers 1983 USFL Draft selections
Draft order			Player name	Position	Height	Weight	College	Contract	Notes
Round	Choice	Overall	Player name	Position	Height	Weight	College	Contract	Notes
1	2	2	Traded to the Chicago Blitz						
1	6	6	Eric Dickerson	RB	6'2"	190	Southern Methodist		
2	23	23	Gary Williams	WR	6'2"	215	Ohio State		
3	26	26	Sid Abramowitz	OT	6'6"	280	Tulsa		
4	47	47	Rob Fada	OG	6'2"	265	Pittsburgh		
6	27	196	Jamar Wall	CB	5'10"	204	Texas Tech		
7	27	234	Sean Lissemore	NT/DE	6'4"	298	William & Mary		

== Schedule ==
Week	Date	Opponent	Result	Record	Venue	Attendance
1	March 6	Oakland Invaders	L 0–24	0–1	Sun Devil Stadium	45,167
2	March 12	Chicago Blitz	W 30–29	1–1	Sun Devil Stadium	28,434
3	March 19	Los Angeles Express	W 21–14	2–1	Sun Devil Stadium	29,335
4	March 26	at Birmingham Stallions	L 7–16	2–2	Legion Field	5,000
5	April 3	New Jersey Generals	L 21–35	2–3	Sun Devil Stadium	31,382
6	April 11	at Washington Federals	W 22–21	3–3	RFK Stadium	13,936
7	April 17	Boston Breakers	L 23–44	3–4	Sun Devil Stadium	20,911
8	April 23	Denver Gold	W 24–3	4–4	Sun Devil Stadium	21,557
9	May 2	at Oakland Invaders	L 20–23	4–5	Oakland–Alameda County Coliseum	27,460
10	May 7	Michigan Panthers	L 10–21	4–6	Sun Devil Stadium	20,423
11	May 15	at Tampa Bay Bandits	L 14–20	4–7	Tampa Stadium	32,327
12	May 22	Philadelphia Stars	L 7–24	4–8	Sun Devil Stadium	18,151
13	May 30	at Chicago Blitz	L 11–36	4–9	Soldier Field	13,952
14	June 5	at Los Angeles Express	L 13–17	4–10	Los Angeles Memorial Coliseum	13,826
15	June 11	Washington Federals	L 11–18	4–11	Sun Devil Stadium	16,656
16	June 17	at Denver Gold	L 6–32	4–12	Mile High Stadium	42,621
17	June 25	at New Jersey Generals	L 14–21	4–13	Giants Stadium	30,612
18	July 3	at Michigan Panthers	L 7–33	4–14	Pontiac Silverdome	31,905

- Sources

== Standings ==
USFL Pacific Division
	W	L	T	PCT	DIV	PF	PA	STK
Oakland Invaders	9	9	0	.500	4–2	319	319	W1
Los Angeles Express	8	10	0	.444	3–3	296	370	W1
Denver Gold	7	11	0	.389	2–4	284	304	L2
Arizona Wranglers	4	14	0	.222	2–4	261	442	L10
