= Jeff George (defensive back) =

American gridiron football player (born 1957)

No. 33, 43, 29
- Position: Cornerback

Personal information
- Born: December 24, 1957 (age 68); Atchison, Kansas, U.S.
- Listed height: 6 ft 1 in (1.85 m)
- Listed weight: 185 lb (84 kg)

Career information
- High school: Atchison
- College: Illinois State
- NFL draft: 1980: undrafted

Career history
- New Orleans Saints (1980)*; Montreal Concordes (1982); Tampa Bay Bandits (1983-1985); Orlando Renegades (1985); Edmonton Eskimos (1986); Tampa Bay Buccaneers (1987)
- * Offseason or practice squad member only
- Stats at Pro Football Reference

Jeffrey L. George (born December 24, 1957) is an American former professional football player who was a cornerback for two games with the Tampa Bay Buccaneers of the National Football League (NFL) in 1987. He played college football for the Illinois State Redbirds. He also played in the Canadian Football League (CFL) for the Montreal Concordes and Edmonton Eskimos, and the United States Football League (USFL) for the Tampa Bay Bandits and Orlando Renegades. He was selected to the 1983 USFL All-Star team.
