= Doug Greene =

American football player (born 1956)

No. 40, 21, 41
- Position: Defensive back

Personal information
- Born: February 10, 1956 (age 70); Los Angeles, California, U.S.
- Listed height: 6 ft 2 in (1.88 m)
- Listed weight: 205 lb (93 kg)

Career information
- High school: Yates (Houston, Texas)
- College: Texas A&M-Kingsville
- NFL draft: 1978: 3rd round, 69th overall pick

Career history
- St. Louis Cardinals (1978); Buffalo Bills (1979–1980); Washington Federals (1983); San Antonio Gunslingers (1984)

Career NFL statistics
- Interceptions: 1
- Stats at Pro Football Reference

Douglas Parks Greene (born February 10, 1956) is an American former professional football player who was a defensive back for three seasons in the National Football League (NFL) with the St. Louis Cardinals and Buffalo Bills. He played college football for the Texas A&M–Kingsville Javelinas He also played professionally for two seasons in the United States Football League (USFL) with the Washington Federals and San Antonio Gunslingers.

== Early life and education ==
Doug Greene was born on February 10, 1956, in Los Angeles, California. He went to high school at Yates High School. He went to college at Texas A&M-Kingsville.

== Professional career ==
=== St. Louis Cardinals ===
Greene was selected in the third round (69th overall) in the 1978 NFL draft. He played in 15 out of 16 games in his rookie season. He also started 4 games. He went to the Buffalo Bills the next season.

=== Buffalo Bills ===
With the Buffalo Bills in 1979, he had his first and only career interception; a 21-yard return. He played 15 games for the Bills. The next year he only played in 8 games.

=== Washington Federals ===
After not playing in 1981 or 1982, he played a season in 1983 with the Washington Federals of the USFL. He had 9 interceptions for 121 yards and a touchdown. He also had a 5-yard sack. He played in all 18 games.

=== San Antonio Gunslingers ===
In 1984, he played for the San Antonio Gunslingers. 1984 was his last season.
