= Hassan Jones =

American football player (born 1964)

No. 84, 81
- Position: Wide receiver

Personal information
- Born: July 2, 1964 (age 62); Clearwater, Florida, U.S.
- Listed height: 6 ft 0 in (1.83 m)
- Listed weight: 198 lb (90 kg)

Career information
- High school: Clearwater
- College: Florida State
- NFL draft: 1986: 5th round, 120th overall pick

Career history
- Minnesota Vikings (1986–1992); Kansas City Chiefs (1993); Oakland Raiders (1995)*
- * Offseason or practice squad member only

Career NFL statistics
- Receptions: 229
- Receiving yards: 3,824
- Receiving touchdowns: 24
- Stats at Pro Football Reference

Hassan Ameer Jones (born July 2, 1964) is an American former professional football player who was a wide receiver for eight seasons in the National Football League (NFL) from 1986 to 1993. He played college football for the Florida State Seminoles and was selected by the Minnesota Vikings in the fifth round of the 1986 NFL draft.

Jones played for the Clearwater High School Tornadoes. A 6'0", 195-lb. wide receiver from Florida State University, Jones' best year as a pro came during the 1990 season for the Vikings when he had 51 receptions for 810 yards and seven touchdowns. He was a first-team All-South Independent in 1985.

== NFL career statistics ==
Legend
**Bold**	Career high

=== Regular season ===
Year	Team	Games		Receiving				
Year	Team	GP	GS	Rec	Yds	Avg	Lng	TD
1986	MIN	**16**	6	28	570	20.4	55	4
1987	MIN	12	0	7	189	**27.0**	58	2
1988	MIN	**16**	**15**	40	778	19.5	68	5
1989	MIN	**16**	13	42	694	16.5	50	1
1990	MIN	15	10	**51**	**810**	15.9	**75**	**7**
1991	MIN	**16**	7	32	384	12.0	43	1
1992	MIN	9	5	22	308	14.0	43	4
1993	KAN	8	0	7	91	13.0	22	0
Career		108	56	229	3,824	16.7	75	24

=== Playoffs ===
Year	Team	Games		Receiving				
Year	Team	GP	GS	Rec	Yds	Avg	Lng	TD
1987	MIN	**3**	0	2	49	**24.5**	**44**	**2**
1988	MIN	2	**2**	**9**	**99**	11.0	18	1
1989	MIN	1	1	2	18	9.0	11	0
1992	MIN	1	0	0	0	0.0	0	0
Career		7	3	13	166	12.8	44	3
