= 1983 Denver Gold season =

Defunct football team in the USFL

- Owner: Ron Blanding
- Head coach: Red Miller; Charley Armey (interim); Craig Morton
- Home stadium: Mile High Stadium

Results
- Record: 7–11
- Division place: 3rd Pacific Division
- Playoffs: Did not qualify

The 1983 season was the inaugural season for the Denver Gold in the United States Football League. The Gold finished with a 7–11 record.

== Schedule ==
Week	Date	Opponent	Result	Record	Venue	Attendance
1	March 6	Philadelphia Stars	L 7–13	0–1	Mile High Stadium	45,102
2	March 13	Boston Breakers	L 7–21	0–2	Mile High Stadium	41,926
3	March 20	at Chicago Blitz	W 16–13	1–2	Soldier Field	22,600
4	March 28	Oakland Invaders	W 22–12	2–2	Mile High Stadium	38,720
5	April 4	at Michigan Panthers	W 29–21	3–2	Pontiac Silverdome	11,279
6	April 9	Tampa Bay Bandits	L 16–22 OT	3–3	Mile High Stadium	46,848
7	April 17	at Birmingham Stallions	W 9–7	4–3	Legion Field	26,250
8	April 23	at Arizona Wranglers	L 3–24	4–4	Sun Devil Stadium	21,557
9	May 1	New Jersey Generals	L 29–34	4–5	Mile High Stadium	37,940
10	May 8	at Philadelphia Stars	L 3–6	4–6	Veterans Stadium	14,306
11	May 15	at Boston Breakers	L 9–17	4–7	Nickerson Field	4,173
12	May 22	Los Angeles Express	L 10–14	4–8	Mile High Stadium	32,963
13	May 27	Birmingham Stallions	W 21–19	5–8	Mile High Stadium	38,829
14	June 3	Washington Federals	W 24–12	6–8	Mile High Stadium	40,671
15	June 13	at Oakland Invaders	L 10–16	6–9	Oakland–Alameda County Coliseum	26,840
16	June 17	Arizona Wranglers	W 32–6	7–9	Mile High Stadium	42,621
17	June 27	at Tampa Bay Bandits	L 23–26	7–10	Tampa Stadium	46,128
18	July 3	at Los Angeles Express	L 14–21	7–11	Los Angeles Memorial Coliseum	11,471

== Standings ==
USFL Pacific Division
	W	L	T	PCT	DIV	PF	PA	STK
Oakland Invaders	9	9	0	.500	4–2	319	319	W1
Los Angeles Express	8	10	0	.444	3–3	296	370	W1
Denver Gold	7	11	0	.389	2–4	284	304	L2
Arizona Wranglers	4	14	0	.222	2–4	261	442	L10
