= Stan Talley =

American football player (born 1958)

No. 5, 10
- Position: Punter

Personal information
- Born: September 5, 1958 (age 68); Dallas, Texas, U.S.
- Listed height: 6 ft 5 in (1.96 m)
- Listed weight: 220 lb (100 kg)

Career information
- High school: West (Torrance, California)
- College: TCU
- NFL draft: 1981: undrafted

Career history
- Atlanta Falcons (1981)*; New Orleans Saints (1982)*; Oakland Invaders (1983–1985); Cleveland Browns (1986)*; Los Angeles Raiders (1987)
- * Offseason or practice squad member only

Career NFL statistics
- Punts: 56
- Punt yards: 2,277
- Longest punt: 63
- Stats at Pro Football Reference

Stan Talley (born September 5, 1958) is an American former professional football player who was a punter in the National Football League (NFL) and United States Football League (USFL). After playing college football for the TCU Horned Frogs, he played in the USFL for the Oakland Invaders from 1983 to 1985 and in the NFL for the Los Angeles Raiders in 1987.
