= David Aupiu =

American football player (born 1961)

No. 90
- Position: Linebacker

Personal information
- Born: February 10, 1961 (age 65); Honolulu, Hawaii, U.S.
- Listed height: 6 ft 2 in (1.88 m)
- Listed weight: 235 lb (107 kg)

Career information
- High school: Carson (CA) (Carson, California, U.S.)
- College: BYU

Career history
- Los Angeles Express (1983); Jacksonville Bulls (1984)*; Los Angeles Rams (1987)
- * Offseason or practice squad member only

Career statistics
- Games: 1
- Stats at Pro Football Reference

Lotupue David Aupiu (born February 10, 1961, in Honolulu, Hawaii) is an American former professional football player who was a linebacker in the National Football League (NFL) and United States Football League (USFL). He played for the Los Angeles Rams in 1987.

Prior to his NFL career, Aupiu played for the Los Angeles Express in 1983. He also participated in the preseason for the Jacksonville Bulls of the United States Football League, but was released prior to the 1984 season.
