= List of Minnesota Vikings first-round draft picks =

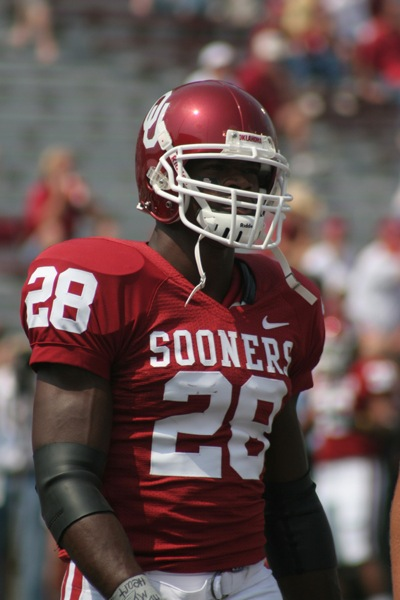
Adrian Peterson, selected by the Vikings with the seventh overall pick in the first round of the 2007 NFL draft.

The Minnesota Vikings joined the National Football League (NFL) in the 1961 season. The Vikings first draft selection as an NFL team was Tommy Mason, a running back from the Tulane Green Wave. The team's most recent first-round selection was Caleb Banks, a defensive end from the Florida Gators.

Every April, each NFL franchise seeks to add new players to its roster through a collegiate draft known as the "NFL Annual Player Selection Meeting", more commonly known as the NFL draft. Teams are ranked in reverse order based on the previous season's record, with team with the worst record picking first, the team with the second worst record picking second, and so on. The two exceptions to this order are made for teams that appeared in the previous Super Bowl; the Super Bowl champion always picks last and the Super Bowl loser always picks second-last. Teams have the option of trading away their picks to other teams for different picks, players, cash, or a combination thereof. Thus, it is not uncommon for a team's actual draft pick to differ from their assigned draft pick, or for a team to have extra or no draft picks in any round due to these trades.

The Vikings have selected number one overall twice. The Vikings received the first pick in 1961 as an expansion franchise and then again in 1968 when the franchise selected Ron Yary, an offensive tackle from the USC Trojans. The Vikings have used first-round selections on players from USC six times. The Vikings have drafted 12 defensive ends, the most common position drafted by the franchise. Six eventual Pro Football Hall of Famers have been selected by the Vikings in the first round: DE Carl Eller, DT Alan Page, DE Chris Doleman, G Randall McDaniel, OT Ron Yary and WR Randy Moss.

== Key ==
Positions key
Offense	Defense	Special teams
QB — Quarterback; RB — Running back; FB — Fullback; WR — Wide receiver; TE — Tight end; OL — Offensive lineman; T — Tackle; G — Guard; C — Center	DL — Defensive lineman; DT — Defensive tackle (Note: Includes nose tackle (NT)); DE — Defensive end; EDGE — Edge rusher; LB — Linebacker (Note: Includes middle linebacker (MLB/MIKE), weakside linebacker (WILL), strongside linebacker (SAM), off-ball linebacker, and outside linebacker (OLB)); DB — Defensive back; CB — Cornerback; S — Safety (Note: Includes free safety (FS) and strong safety (SS))	K — Kicker (Note: Also known as a placekicker (PK)); P — Punter; LS — Long snapper; RS — Return specialist (Note: Includes kickoff and punt returners)

Key
^	Indicates the player was inducted into the Pro Football Hall of Fame.
§	Enshrined in the Minnesota Vikings Ring of Honor
†	Indicates the player was selected for the Pro Bowl at any time in their career.
*	Selected number one overall
—	The Vikings did not draft a player in the first round that year.
Year	Each year links to an article about that particular NFL Draft.
Pick	Indicates the number of the pick within the first round
Position	The player's position
College	The player's college football team

== Player selections ==
Minnesota Vikings first-round draft picks
Year	Pick	Player name	Position	College	Notes
National Football League, early era (1961–1969)
1961	1	Tommy Mason † *	RB	Tulane	
1962	No pick				(Note: The Vikings first-round pick in 1962 was acquired by the Los Angeles Rams from the New York Giants. The Vikings had traded their first-round pick in 1962 to the Giants for quarterback George Shaw.)
1963	3	Jim Dunaway	DT	Ole Miss	(Note: Jim Dunaway opted to sign with the Buffalo Bills of the American Football League (AFL).)
1964	6	Carl Eller † § ^	DE	Minnesota	
1965	8	Jack Snow	WR	Notre Dame	(Note: The Vikings traded Snow to the Los Angeles Rams before the start of the 1965 NFL season.)
1966	7	Jerry Shay	DT	Purdue	
1967	2	Clinton Jones	RB	Michigan State	(Note: The Vikings acquired the New York Giants 2nd and 28th (second-round) overall picks from the 1967 draft, the 1st overall pick from the 1968 draft and the 39th (second-round) pick from the 1969 draft in exchange for QB Fran Tarkenton.)
1967	8	Gene Washington †	WR	Michigan State	
1967	15	Alan Page † § ^	DE	Notre Dame	(Note: The 15th pick in 1967 was acquired from the Los Angeles Rams.)
1968	1	Ron Yary † § ^ *	OT	USC	
1969	No pick				(Note: The Vikings first-round pick in 1969 was acquired by the New Orleans Saints.)
National Football League, modern era (1970–present)
1970	25	John Ward	OT	Oklahoma State	
1971	24	Leo Hayden	RB	Ohio State	
1972	10	Jeff Siemon †	LB	Stanford	(Note: The Vikings traded QB Joe Kapp to the Boston Patriots in 1970 in exchange for the 10th overall pick in 1972.)
1973	12	Chuck Foreman † §	RB	Miami (FL)	
1974	17	Fred McNeill	LB	UCLA	(Note: The Vikings traded QB Bob Lee and LB Lonnie Warwick to the Atlanta Falcons in exchange for QB Bob Berry and the 17th overall pick.)
1974	25	Steve Riley	OT	USC	
1975	25	Mark Mullaney	DE	Colorado State	
1976	25	James White	DT	Oklahoma State	
1977	27	Tommy Kramer †	QB	Rice	
1978	21	Randy Holloway	DE	Pittsburgh	
1979	16	Ted Brown	RB	NC State	
1980	9	Doug Martin	DT	Washington	
1981	No pick				(Note: The Vikings traded their first-round pick (18th overall) to the Baltimore Colts in exchange for two second-round and a fifth-round draft picks.)
1982	7	Darrin Nelson	RB	Stanford	
1983	19	Joey Browner † §	S	USC	
1984	13	Keith Millard †	DE	Washington State	
1984*	13	Allanda Smith	CB	TCU	(Note: In 1984, The NFL held a three-round supplemental draft for college seniors who had already signed with a USFL or CFL team. The Vikings selected Allanda Smith who had already signed the Los Angeles Express of the USFL.)
1985	4	Chris Doleman † § ^	DE	Pittsburgh	(Note: The Vikings traded their second overall pick to the Atlanta Falcons in exchange for the fourth overall pick and a third-round pick (60th overall).)
1986	14	Gerald Robinson	DE	Auburn	(Note: The Vikings traded their eighth overall and 67th overall (third-round) to the San Diego Chargers in exchange for the 14th and 44th (second-round) overall picks.)
1987	14	D. J. Dozier	RB	Penn State	(Note: The Vikings traded their 16th overall and a fifth-round pick to the Miami Dolphins in exchange for the Dolphins' 14th overall pick.)
1988	19	Randall McDaniel † § ^	G	Arizona State	
1989	No pick				(Note: The Vikings 24th overall pick was acquired by the Pittsburgh Steelers in exchange for LB Mike Merriweather .)
1990	No pick				(Note: These picks were involved in the Herschel Walker trade on October 12, 1989.)
1991	No pick				
1992	No pick				
1993	21	Robert Smith †	RB	Ohio State	
1994	18	Dewayne Washington	CB	NC State	(Note: The Vikings traded OT Gary Zimmerman to the Denver Broncos in exchange for the Broncos' 18th and 179th (sixth-round) picks in the 1994 draft, and the 42nd (second-round) overall pick in the 1995 draft.)
1994	19	Todd Steussie †	OT	California	
1995	11	Derrick Alexander	DE	Florida State	(Note: The Vikings traded DE Chris Doleman to the Atlanta Falcons in exchange for the Falcons' 40th overall pick in the 1994 draft and the 11th overall pick in the 1995 draft.)
1995	24	Korey Stringer † §	OT	Ohio State	
1996	16	Duane Clemons	LB	California	
1997	20	Dwayne Rudd	LB	Alabama	
1998	21	Randy Moss † § ^	WR	Marshall	
1999	11	Daunte Culpepper †	QB	UCF	(Note: The Vikings traded QB Brad Johnson to the Washington Redskins in exchange for the Redskins' 11th and 73rd (third-round) picks in the 1999 draft and the 56th overall (fifth-round) pick in the 2000 draft.)
1999	29	Dimitrius Underwood	DE	Michigan State	
2000	25	Chris Hovan	DT	Boston College	
2001	27	Michael Bennett †	RB	Wisconsin	
2002	7	Bryant McKinnie †	OT	Miami (FL)	
2003	9	Kevin Williams †	DT	Oklahoma State	(Note: While attempting to agree a trade, the Vikings time elapsed, allowing the Jacksonville Jaguars to move up and select QB Byron Leftwich. The Carolina Panthers were also able to select OT Jordan Gross before the Vikings ultimately made their selection.)
2004	20	Kenechi Udeze	DE	USC	(Note: The Vikings traded their 19th overall pick from the 2004 draft to the Miami Dolphins in exchange for the Dolphins' 20th and 119th (fourth-round) picks.)
2005	7	Troy Williamson	WR	South Carolina	(Note: The Vikings traded wide receiver Randy Moss to the Oakland Raiders in exchange for the Raiders' LB Napoleon Harris and the seventh and 219th (seventh-round) overall picks.)
2005	18	Erasmus James	DE	Wisconsin	
2006	17	Chad Greenway †	LB	Iowa	
2007	7	Adrian Peterson †	RB	Oklahoma	
2008	No pick				(Note: The Vikings traded their 17th overall pick (first-round), the 73rd and 82nd overall picks (third-round), and 182nd overall pick (sixth-round) to the Kansas City Chiefs in exchange for DE Jared Allen.)
2009	22	Percy Harvin †	WR	Florida	
2010	No pick				(Note: The Vikings traded their 30th overall pick (first-round) and the 128th overall pick (fourth-round) in the 2010 draft to the Detroit Lions for the 34th overall pick (second-round), the 100th overall pick (fourth-round), and the 214th overall pick (seventh-round) in the 2010 draft.)
2011	12	Christian Ponder	QB	Florida State	
2012	4	Matt Kalil †	OT	USC	(Note: The Vikings traded their original 3rd overall pick (first-round) in the 2012 draft to the Cleveland Browns for the 4th overall pick (first-round), the 118th overall pick (fourth-round), the 139th overall pick (fifth-round), and the 211th overall pick (seventh-round) in the 2012 draft.)
2012	29	Harrison Smith †	S	Notre Dame	(Note: The Vikings traded the 35th overall pick (second-round) and 98th overall pick (fourth-round) in the 2012 draft to the Baltimore Ravens for the 29th overall pick (first-round) in the 2012 draft.)
2013	23	Sharrif Floyd	DT	Florida	
2013	25	Xavier Rhodes †	CB	Florida State	(Note: The Vikings traded WR Percy Harvin to the Seattle Seahawks for the 25th overall pick (first-round) and 214th overall pick (seventh-round) in the 2013 draft as well as the Seahawks third-round selection in the 2014 draft.)
2013	29	Cordarrelle Patterson †	WR	Tennessee	(Note: The Vikings traded the 52nd overall pick (second-round), 83rd overall pick (third-round), 102nd overall pick (fourth-round), and 229th overall pick (seventh-round) in the 2013 draft to the New England Patriots for the 29th overall pick (first-round) in the 2013 draft.)
2014	9	Anthony Barr †	LB	UCLA	(Note: The Vikings traded their original 8th overall pick (first-round) in the 2014 draft to the Cleveland Browns for the 9th overall pick (first-round), and the 145th overall pick (fifth-round) in the 2014 draft.)
2014	32	Teddy Bridgewater †	QB	Louisville	(Note: The Vikings traded their original 40th overall pick (second-round) and 108th overall pick (fourth-round) in the 2014 draft to the Seattle Seahawks for the 32nd overall pick (first-round).)
2015	11	Trae Waynes	CB	Michigan State	
2016	23	Laquon Treadwell	WR	Ole Miss	
2017	No pick				(Note: The Vikings traded their 14th overall pick in the 2017 draft and their fourth-round pick in the 2018 draft to the Philadelphia Eagles for QB Sam Bradford.)
2018	30	Mike Hughes	CB	UCF	
2019	18	Garrett Bradbury	C	NC State	
2020	22	Justin Jefferson †	WR	LSU	(Note: The Vikings traded a seventh-round selection (239th overall) and WR Stefon Diggs to the Buffalo Bills in exchange for Buffalo's first-, fifth- and sixth-round selections (22nd, 155th and 201st overall) and 2021 fourth-round selection.)
2020	31	Jeff Gladney	CB	TCU	(Note: The Vikings traded their original first-round selection (25th overall) to the San Francisco 49ers in exchange for San Francisco's first-, fourth- and fifth-round selections (31st, 117th and 176th overall).)
2021	23	Christian Darrisaw	OT	Virginia Tech	(Note: The Vikings traded their original first- and a fourth-round selection (14th and 143rd overall) to the New York Jets in exchange for the first-round selection the Jets received from the Seattle Seahawks (23rd overall) and two third-round selections (66th and 86th overall).)
2022	32	Lewis Cine	S	Georgia	(Note: The Vikings traded their original first- and a second-round selection (12th and 46th overall) to the Detroit Lions in exchange for Detroit's first-, second- and third-round selections (32nd, 34th and 66th overall).)
2023	23	Jordan Addison	WR	USC	
2024	10	J. J. McCarthy	QB	Michigan	(Note: The Vikings traded their original first-, and fourth- and fifth-round selections to the Houston Texans in exchange for a first-round selection (10th overall) and a sixth-round selection (203rd overall).)
2024	17	Dallas Turner	LB	Alabama	(Note: The Vikings traded second- and sixth-round selections (42nd and 188th overall), and a 2025 second-round selection to the Houston Texans in exchange for first- and seventh-round selection (23rd and 232nd overall).) (Note: The Vikings traded the first-round selection they received from the Houston Texans (23rd overall), a fifth-round selection (167th overall), a 2025 third-round selection and a 2025 fourth-round selection to the Jacksonville Jaguars in exchange for a first-round selection (17th overall).)
2025	24	Donovan Jackson	G	Ohio State	
2026	18	Caleb Banks	DE	Florida	

=== By college ===
College	Draftees
USC	6
Michigan State	4
Ohio State	4
Notre Dame	3
Oklahoma State	3
Florida State	3
Florida	3
NC State	3
Stanford	2
Miami (FL)	2
UCLA	2
Pittsburgh	2
California	2
Wisconsin	2
Ole Miss	2
UCF	2
TCU	2
Alabama	2
23 colleges	1

=== By position ===
Position	Draftees
Defensive end	12
Running back	10
Cornerback	9
Wide receiver	9
Offensive tackle	8
Defensive tackle	7
Linebacker	7
Quarterback	5
Guard	2
Center	1
