= Billy Taylor (running back, born 1956) =

American football player (born 1956)

No. 38, 49
- Position: Running back

Personal information
- Born: July 6, 1956 (age 70); San Antonio, Texas, U.S.
- Listed height: 6 ft 0 in (1.83 m)
- Listed weight: 215 lb (98 kg)

Career information
- High school: John Jay (TX)
- College: Texas Tech
- NFL draft: 1978: 4th round, 90th overall pick

Career history
- New York Giants (1978–1981); New York Jets (1981); Los Angeles Raiders (1982); Washington Federals (1983–1984)

Career NFL statistics
- Rushing yards: 1,644
- Rushing average: 3.6
- Receptions: 78
- Receiving yards: 647
- Touchdowns: 17
- Stats at Pro Football Reference

Billy Taylor (born July 6, 1956) is an American former professional football player who was selected by the New York Giants in the fourth round of the 1978 NFL draft. A 6'0", 215-lb. running back from Texas Tech, Taylor played for five NFL seasons as a running back and kick returner. He spent his first three seasons as a member of the Giants, and spent his final two split between the Giants, the New York Jets, and the Los Angeles Raiders. As the starting running back for the Giants, he led the team in rushing in 1979 and 1980. His best season was in 1979, when he started all 16 games, carrying the ball 198 times for 700 yards and catching it another 28 times for 253 yards with 11 total touchdowns. The Jets picked him up after the Giants waived him in 1981, but they cut him three weeks later when they needed to add a defensive lineman to replace the injured Marty Lyons. Taylor then played two seasons for the Washington Federals of the USFL, amassing 171 rushes for 757 yards and 5 touchdowns along with 64 receptions for 523 yards and 2 touchdowns in 1983. In 1984, Taylor rushed 142 times for 499 yards while also collecting 51 receptions for 387 yards and a touchdown.

Taylor went on to become a corporate trainer for Hunter Douglas, and involved with charities. Billy Taylor was a successful broadcast journalist after playing football. This included stints with TV and radio. Most notably he co-hosted with Larry Hardesty on WLIB a talk show which had good success as the only minority talk show in New York City Area.
