= Kevin Nelson (broadcaster) =

Kevin Nelson (1959–2011) was a radio announcer and television reporter in Ottawa, Ontario, Canada. After suffering from illness for years Nelson died at the age of 52 on December 13, 2011.

== Career ==
=== Radio ===
Kevin was born in Pennsylvania in the United States. When his father, Jay Nelson, accepted the morning show position at 1050 CHUM the family moved to Toronto, Ontario, Canada. Kevin's father, known to many on Canadian national radio as Jungle Jay Nelson, worked at 1050 CHUM for 17 years. In high school, Kevin started following in his father's footsteps by getting his first radio show. He created a (some say) humorous style at various Ontario radio stations before moving to Calgary and working there for eight years as morning show host at popular light rock station FM 96 CHFM.

In 1991 he returned to Ontario to help launch the radio station Majic 100 with co-host Karen Evans (formerly of Mix96 Montreal and 1050 CHUM Toronto). It premiered as 'Kevin and Karen in the morning'. She resigned the moment her one-year contract was up and was replaced by Judy Croon who also resigned. Kim Taylor replaced Judy and also resigned.

=== Television ===
Kevin worked as a weather announcer on CBOT-TV and hosted the Majic 100 Top 20 on CHRO-TV's Workvideo Countdown.

== Charities ==
Kevin was the Master of Ceremonies for hundreds of charity events every year.

== Death ==
Kevin Nelson died after a long illness on December 13, 2011 in Ottawa, Ontario.

Nelson developed a virus after a trip to St. Lucia in the summer of 2010. The virus, combined with pre-existing liver problems, caused complications and an 18-month struggle with a debilitating medical condition that he was unable to overcome.
