= Mike Durrette =

American football player (born 1957)

No. 60, 64
- Position: Offensive lineman

Personal information
- Born: August 11, 1957 (age 69); Charlottesville, Virginia, U.S.
- Listed height: 6 ft 4 in (1.93 m)
- Listed weight: 280 lb (127 kg)

Career information
- High school: The Miller School of Albemarle (Charlottesville, Virginia)
- College: West Virginia
- NFL draft: 1982: undrafted

Career history
- Los Angeles Raiders (1982)*; Los Angeles Express (1983-1985); San Francisco 49ers (1986–1987); Minnesota Vikings (1987)*
- * Offseason or practice squad member only

Career NFL statistics
- Games played: 12
- Games started: 3
- Stats at Pro Football Reference

Michael Ray Durrette (born August 11, 1957) is a former offensive lineman in the National Football League (NFL). He played for the Los Angeles Express in the United States Football League (USFL), and the San Francisco 49ers in the NFL. He was selected in the 1986 NFL draft out of West Virginia.
