= David Rackley (American football) =

American football player (born 1961)

No. 47
- Positions: Wide receiver, cornerback

Personal information
- Born: February 2, 1961 (age 65); Miami, Florida, U.S.
- Listed height: 5 ft 9 in (1.75 m)
- Listed weight: 172 lb (78 kg)

Career information
- High school: Miami Jackson
- College: Texas Southern

Career history
- Los Angeles Express (1984); San Diego Chargers (1985)*; New Orleans Saints (1985)
- * Offseason or practice squad member only
- Stats at Pro Football Reference

David Henry Rackley (born February 2, 1961) is an American former professional football player for the New Orleans Saints of the National Football League (NFL). He played college football for the Texas Southern Tigers.

== Early life ==
David Henry Rackley was born on February 2, 1961, in Miami, Florida. He attended Miami Jackson Senior High School.

== College career ==
Rackley played junior college football at Miami-Dade Community College. He transferred to Texas Southern University to play for the Tigers.

== Professional career ==
Rackley played for the Los Angeles Express of the United States Football League in 1984. He signed with the San Diego Chargers in 1985 but was released.

Rackley signed with the New Orleans Saints on August 13, 1985, as a wide receiver and cornerback. He played in seven games for the Saints in a reserve role, returning one kick for 63 yards while also being targeted once. He was placed on injured reserve on November 21, 1985, after hurting his hamstring in a game.
