= John Barnett =

John Barnett may refer to:

- John Barnett (Australian rules footballer) (born 1975), former Australian rules footballer
- John Barnett (composer) (1802–1890), English composer
- John Barnett (rugby) (1880–1918), Australian rugby union and rugby league footballer
- John Francis Barnett (1837–1916), English music composer and teacher
- John Davis Barnett (1848–1926), early Canadian curator-librarian
- Jack Barnett (baseball) (1879–1923), American baseball player
- John Maughan Barnett (1867–1938), New Zealand organist, choirmaster and conductor
- John T. Barnett (1851–1935), American colonel
- John W. Barnett (c.1800–1876), American farmer, merchant and community leader
- John Manley Barnett (1917–2013), American conductor
- John Barnett (producer) (1945–2025), New Zealand film and television producer
- John Barnett (whistleblower) (1962–2024), Boeing whistleblower

== See also ==
- John Barnet (died 1373), English bishop
