= Clifton Alapa =

American gridiron football player (born 1954)

Profile
- Position: Defensive lineman

Personal information
- Born: December 14, 1954 (age 71); Kahuku, Hawaii, U.S.

Career information
- College: Arizona State

Career history
- 1977–78: Montreal Alouettes
- 1978: Hamilton Tiger-Cats
- 1983: Los Angeles Express

Awards and highlights
- 1977 - Grey Cup champion

Clifton Farrell Alapa (born December 14, 1954) is a former Canadian Football League defensive lineman and Grey Cup champion.

Alapa was born in Kahuku, Hawaii, the hometown of CFL all-star Junior Ah You. They are both of Samoan descent, went to the same university and were friends when they played together in Montreal.

Alapa joined the Montreal Alouettes in 1977, playing 12 games and was part of their Grey Cup championship. He played 10 more games for the Larks in 1978, joining the Hamilton Tiger-Cats for the last 4 games of the 1978 season. He made a comeback in 1983 with the Los Angeles Express of the USFL, registering 1.5 sacks.
