= Eric Truvillion =

American football player (born 1959)

No. 84, 45
- Position: Wide receiver

Personal information
- Born: June 18, 1959 (age 67); New York City, U.S.
- Listed height: 6 ft 4 in (1.93 m)
- Listed weight: 205 lb (93 kg)

Career information
- High school: New York (NY) Springfield Gardens
- College: Florida A&M
- NFL draft: 1982: undrafted

Career history
- New York Jets (1982)*; Tampa Bay Bandits (1983-1985); Detroit Lions (1987); Indianapolis Colts (1988)*
- * Offseason or practice squad member only

Career NFL statistics
- Receptions: 12
- Receiving yards: 207
- Receiving touchdowns: 1
- Stats at Pro Football Reference

Eric Truvillion (born June 18, 1959) was an American professional football player who played in the United States Football League (USFL) and the National Football League (NFL). He attended Springfield Gardens High School in Queens, New York.

== Career ==
He was drafted by the Tampa Bay Bandits of the United States Football League in 1983 after a college football career at Florida A&M. He played quarterback and defensive back in college but was converted to wide receiver by Tampa Bay to take advantage of his height (6 ft 4 in) and catching abilities. He signed a contract with the Bandits in 1984.

In his rookie season, Truvillion caught 66 passes for 1080 yards and 15 touchdowns. He caught 70 passes for 1044 yards and 9 touchdowns in 1984. His last USFL season, 1985, saw him catch 31 passes for 478 yards and 6 touchdowns as an injury shortened his season. He was named to one USFL All-Star team during his USFL career.

His career seemed over until the National Football League strike in 1987, when he crossed the picket line as a replacement player and played for the Detroit Lions as their starting wide receiver. He caught 12 passes for 207 yards and 1 touchdown before the regular players returned. Truvillion retired from pro football after that.

== Career stats ==
- USFL
  - Catches-167
  - Yards-2602
  - Touchdowns-30
  - Yards Per Catch-15.6
