= Trumaine Johnson (wide receiver) =

American football player (born 1960)

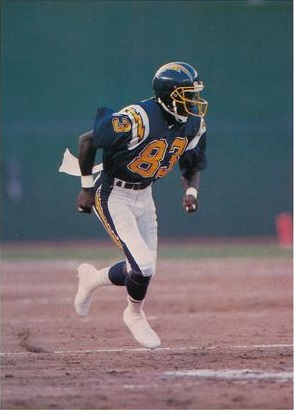
- Johnson c. 1985

No. 2, 83, 86, 85
- Position: Wide receiver

Personal information
- Born: November 16, 1960 (age 65); Bogalusa, Louisiana, U.S.
- Listed height: 6 ft 3 in (1.91 m)
- Listed weight: 185 lb (84 kg)

Career information
- High school: Baker (LA)
- College: Grambling State
- NFL draft: 1983: 6th round, 141st overall pick

Career history
- Chicago Blitz (1983); Arizona Wranglers (1984); San Diego Chargers (1985–1986); Buffalo Bills (1987–1988); Toronto Argonauts (1990–1991)

Career NFL statistics
- Receptions: 86
- Receiving yards: 1,150
- Receiving touchdowns: 4
- Stats at Pro Football Reference

Trumaine Johnson (born November 16, 1960) is an American former professional football player who was a wide receiver in the United States Football League (USFL), National Football League (NFL), and Canadian Football League (CFL).

Johnson was born in Bogalusa, Louisiana and played scholastically at Baker High School. He played collegiately for the Grambling State Tigers, where, as a senior, he was honored by The Sporting News as a first-team All-American.

== Career ==
Johnson was selected by the Chicago Blitz of the United States Football League in the 1983 USFL draft after a college football career at Grambling State University.

Johnson caught a league leading 81 passes for a league leading 1327 yards with 10 touchdowns in his rookie season with the Blitz. He was named to the USFL All-Star team.

In 1984, Johnson played for the Arizona Wranglers and caught 90 passes for 1258 yards with 13 touchdowns. He was again named to the USFL All-Star team.

He then switched to the National Football League in 1985 and played for the San Diego Chargers as a reserve wide receiver for the next two seasons. He joined the Buffalo Bills in 1987 and had his biggest NFL season there in 1988 when he caught 38 passes for 528 yards. He retired after that season.

== Career stats ==
- USFL
  - Catches - 171
  - Yards - 2585
  - Touchdowns - 23
  - Yards Per Catch - 15.1
