= Kit Lathrop =

American football player and coach (born 1956)

Toronto Argonauts
- Title: Defensive line coach

Personal information
- Born: August 10, 1956 (age 70); San Jose, California, U.S.
- Listed height: 6 ft 5 in (1.96 m)
- Listed weight: 255 lb (116 kg)

Career information
- High school: Leigh (San Jose)
- College: Arizona State
- NFL draft: 1978: undrafted

Career history

Playing
- Detroit Lions (1978)*; Denver Broncos (1979); Green Bay Packers (1979–1980); Chicago Blitz (1983); Arizona Wranglers (1984); Arizona Outlaws (1985); Kansas City Chiefs (1986); Washington Redskins (1987)
- * Offseason or practice squad member only

Coaching
- Arizona State (1978) Graduate assistant; Ventura College (1981) Defensive line; UNLV (1982) Defensive line; Arizona Western College (1993–1998) Assistant head coach; BC Lions (1999–2000) Defensive line; Ottawa Renegades (2002) Defensive line; Ottawa Renegades (2003) Defensive coordinator; Edmonton Eskimos (2011–2012) Defensive line; Toronto Argonauts (2016–present) Defensive line

Awards and highlights
- Super Bowl champion (XXII); 2× All-USFL Team: 1983, 1984

Career NFL statistics
- Games played: 43
- Games started: 0
- Fumble recoveries: 2
- Stats at Pro Football Reference

Kit Douglas Lathrop (born August 10, 1956) is an American former professional football player who was a defensive lineman in the National Football League (NFL) and in the United States Football League (USFL). He played college football for the Arizona State Sun Devils.

== College career ==
He played college football at West Valley College and Arizona State University.

== Professional career ==
In the NFL, he played for the Denver Broncos, the Green Bay Packers, the Kansas City Chiefs, and the Washington Redskins. In the USFL, he played for the Chicago Blitz, the Arizona Wranglers, and the Arizona Outlaws. Lathrop earned a Super Bowl ring with the Redskins in 1987.
