= 1983 USFL season =

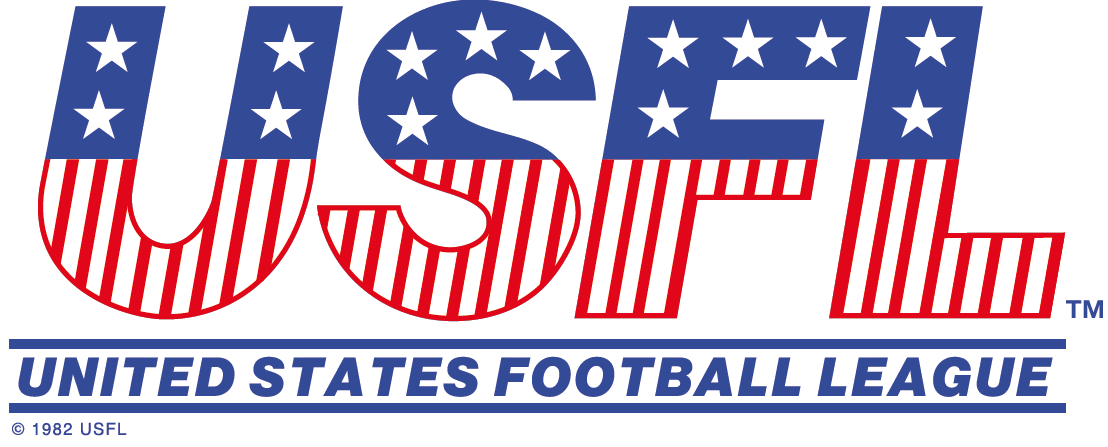
- Duration: March 6 – July 3, 1983
- Date: July 17, 1983
- Finals venue: Denver, Colorado
- Finals champions: Michigan Panthers

Seasons
- 1984

USFL teams: Pacific, Central, Atlantic

The 1983 USFL season was the inaugural season of the United States Football League.

== Rules differences from NFL ==
- Optional 2 point conversion after touchdown (the NFL would add this rule in 1994).
- Optional 1 inch kicking tee for extra points and field goal attempts.
- Clock stop on first downs within the last 2 minutes of the 2nd and 4th quarters.
- Intentional and unintentional pass interference.
- Six member officiating crew (no side judge).
- The USFL game ball was 3/8 inch (1 cm) shorter than the NFL game ball (both made by Wilson).
- There were no preseason games.

== Expansion cities for 1984 ==
During the 1983 season, the USFL announced expansion cities for the 1984 season.

- Pittsburgh April 28
- San Diego May 16; moved to Tulsa July 7
- Houston May 19
- Jacksonville June 14
- San Antonio July 11
- Memphis July 17

== Regular season ==
USFL Atlantic Division
	W	L	T	PCT	DIV	PF	PA	STK
Philadelphia Stars	15	3	0	.833	4–2	379	204	L1
Boston Breakers	11	7	0	.611	5–1	399	334	W1
New Jersey Generals	6	12	0	.333	2–4	314	437	L1
Washington Federals	4	14	0	.222	1–5	297	422	W2

USFL Central Division
	W	L	T	PCT	DIV	PF	PA	STK
Michigan Panthers	12	6	0	.667	4–2	451	337	W4
Chicago Blitz	12	6	0	.667	4–2	456	271	W1
Tampa Bay Bandits	11	7	0	.611	2–4	363	378	L1
Birmingham Stallions	9	9	0	.500	2–4	343	326	W1

USFL Pacific Division
	W	L	T	PCT	DIV	PF	PA	STK
Oakland Invaders	9	9	0	.500	4–2	319	319	W1
Los Angeles Express	8	10	0	.444	3–3	296	370	W1
Denver Gold	7	11	0	.389	2–4	284	304	L2
Arizona Wranglers	4	14	0	.222	2–4	261	442	L10

Michigan won the tiebreaker with Chicago based on season series 2–0

== Playoffs ==
Away team	Score	Home team	Date
Divisional playoffs
Chicago Blitz	38–44 (OT)	Philadelphia Stars	July 9, 1983
Oakland Invaders	21–37	Michigan Panthers	July 10, 1983
USFL Championship Game Mile High Stadium, Denver Colorado
Michigan Panthers	24–22	Philadelphia Stars	July 17, 1983

Division playoffs
A1	Philadelphia	44 (OT)
C2	Chicago	38
P1	Oakland	21
C1	Michigan	37

USFL Championship
A1	Philadelphia	22
C1	Michigan	24

== Statistics ==
=== 1983 regular season stat leaders ===
1983 Passing Leaders (over 100 attempts)
Name, Team	Att	Comp	%	yards	YDs/Att	TD	TD %	Long	INT	INT %	Rating
Bobby Hebert, MICH	451	257	57.0	3568	7.91	27	6.0	t81	17	3.8	86.8
Fred Besana, OAK	550	345	62.7	3980	7.24	21	3.8	t80	16	2.9	85.1
Greg Landry, CHIC	334	188	56.3	2383	7.13	16	4.8	52	9	2.7	83.5
Jimmy Jordan, TB	238	145	60.9	1831	7.69	14	5.9	49	14	5.9	80.0
Chuck Fusina, PHIL	421	238	56.5	2718	6.46	15	3.6	52	10	2.4	78.1
Alan Risher, ARIZ	424	236	55.7	2672	6.30	20	4.7	t98	16	3.8	74.7
Johnnie Walton, BOS	589	330	56.0	3772	6.40	20	3.4	t86	18	3.1	74.0
Mike Rae, LA	319	175	54.9	1964	6.16	11	3.4	t61	10	3.1	71.9
Mike Hohensee, WASH	190	92	48.4	1297	6.83	9	4.7	t80	7	3.7	71.3
Bobby Scott, NJ/CHIC	374	210	56.1	2813	7.52	11	2.9	t65	19	5.1	68.9
Tom Ramsey, LA	307	160	52.1	1975	6.43	13	4.2	t82	14	4.6	67.4
Mike Kelley, TB	166	81	48.8	1003	6.04	4	2.4	43	5	3.0	63.4
Bob Lane, BIRM	346	175	50.6	2264	6.54	14	4.0	53	18	5.2	63.3
Kim McQuilken, WASH	334	188	56.3	1912	5.72	7	2.1	55	14	4.2	62.4
John Reaves, TB	259	139	53.7	1726	6.66	9	3.5	51	16	6.2	60.4
Ken Johnson, DENV	248	121	48.8	1115	4.50	6	2.4	t56	12	4.8	49.4
Joe Gilliam, WASH	102	40	39.2	673	6.60	5	4.9	t52	12	11.8	39.0
Reggie Collier, BIRM	108	47	43.5	604	5.59	1	0.9	t46	7	6.5	37.7
Dan Manucci, ARIZ	119	52	43.7	577	4.85	2	1.7	t48	8	6.7	36.3
Jeff Knapple, DENV/NJ	213	105	49.3	1191	5.59	3	1.4	41	19	8.9	34.0

1983 Rushing leaders
POS Name, Team	Att	Yds	Avg.	Long	TDs
HB Herschel Walker, NJ	412	1812	4.4	t83	17
HB Kelvin Bryant, PHIL	318	1442	4.5	45	16
HB Ken Lacy, MI	232	1180	5.1	59	6
HB Tim Spencer, CHIC	300	1157	3.9	25	6
HB Arthur Whittington, OAK	282	1043	3.7	24	6
HB Kevin Long, CHIC	262	1022	3.9	33	12
HB Richard Crump, BOS	190	990	5.2	62	8
HB Ken Talton, BIRM	228	907	4.0	28	5
HB Craig James, WASH	202	823	4.1	24	4
HB Harry Sydney, DENV	176	801	4.6	45	9
HB Billy Taylor, WASH	171	757	4.4	34	5
HB Calvin Murray, ARIZ	179	699	3.9	34	4
HB Greg Boone, TB	174	694	4.0	21	5
HB Allen Harvin, PHIL	139	681	4.9	49	7
HB Larry Canada, DENV	142	631	4.4	t24	3

1983 Receiving Leaders
POS Name, Team	Rec	Yds	Avg.	Long	TDs
WR Trumaine Johnson, CHIC	81	1322	16.3	56	10
WR Danny Buggs, TB	76	1146	15.1	51	5
WR Ricky Ellis, LA	69	716	10.4	36	6
TE Raymond Chester, OAK	68	951	14.0	57	5
WR Eric Truvillion, TB	66	1080	16.4	46	15
HB Arthur Whittington, OAK	66	584	8.8	3.7	2
TE Mark Keel, ARIZ	65	802	12.3	27	2
HB Billy Taylor, WASH	64	523	8.2	55	2
WR Joey Walters, WASH	63	959	15.2	42	6
WR Jackie Flowers, ARIZ	63	869	13.8	t98	11
WR Neil Balholm, ARIZ	63	703	11.2	27	5
WR Nolan Franz, BOS	62	848	13.7	50	4
WR Gordon Banks, OAK	61	855	14.0	41	2
TE Michael Cobb, MICH	61	746	12.2	31	5
WR Anthony Carter, MICH	60	1181	19.7	t81	9
WR Scott Fitzkee, PHIL	55	731	13.3	44	3
WR Charles Smith, BOS	54	1009	18.7	t58	5
WR Wyatt Henderson, OAK	54	801	14.8	t53	9
HB Herschel Walker, NJ	53	489	9.2	t65	1
HB Kelvin Bryant, PHIL	53	410	7.7	50	1

== Awards ==
=== Offense ===
Position	Player(s)
Quarterback	11 Bobby Hebert, Michigan Panthers
Running back	34 Herschel Walker, New Jersey Generals; 44 Kelvin Bryant, Philadelphia Stars
Wide receiver	2 Trumaine Johnson, Chicago Blitz; 84 Eric Truvillion, Tampa Bay Bandits
Tight end	87 Raymond Chester, Oakland Invaders
Offensive tackle	75 Irv Eatman, Philadelphia Stars; 74 Ray Pinney, Michigan Panthers
Guard	78 Buddy Aydelette, Birmingham Stallions; 63 Thom Dornbrook, Michigan Panthers
Center	67 Bob Van Duyne, Tampa Bay Bandits

=== Defense ===
Position	Player(s)
Defensive end	79 Mike Raines, Birmingham Stallions; 70 Kit Lathrop, Chicago Blitz
Defensive tackle	68 Fred Nordgren, Tampa Bay Bandits
Linebacker	57 John Corker, Michigan Panthers; 52 Stan White, Chicago Blitz; 54 Sam Mills, Philadelphia Stars; 56 Marcus Marek, Boston Breakers
Cornerback	33 Jeff George, Tampa Bay Bandits; 34 David Martin, Denver Gold
Safety	27 Luther Bradley, Chicago Blitz; 25 Scott Woerner, Philadelphia Stars

=== Special teams ===
Position	Player(s)
Kicker	5 Tim Mazzetti, Boston Breakers
Punter	10 Stan Talley, Oakland Invaders
Kickoff returner	40 Eric Robinson, Washington Federals
Punt returner	34 David Martin, Denver Gold

=== Season awards ===
Award	Winner	Position	Team
USFL Most Valuable Player	Kelvin Bryant	RB	Philadelphia Stars
USFL Most Valuable Player (AP)	Kelvin Bryant	RB	Philadelphia Stars
USFL Player of the Year (TSN)	Bobby Hebert	QB	Michigan Panthers
USFL Man of the Year	Raymond Chester	WR	Oakland Invaders
USFL Coach of the Year	Dick Coury	Head coach	Boston Breakers
USFL Coach of the Year (TSN)	Dick Coury	Head coach	Boston Breakers
USFL Outstanding Running Back	Herschel Walker	RB	New Jersey Generals
USFL Outstanding Quarterback	Bobby Hebert	QB	Michigan Panthers
USFL Leading Scorer Award	David Trout	K	Philadelphia Stars
USFL Leading Receiver	Trumaine Johnson	WR	Chicago Blitz
USFL Defensive Player of the Year	John Corker	LB	Michigan Panthers
USFL Outstanding Lineman	Kit Lathrop	DL	Chicago Blitz
Special Teams Player of the Year	Stan Talley	P	Oakland Invaders
USFL Executive of the Year (TSN)	Carl Peterson	General manager	Philadelphia Stars

== See also ==
- 1983 NFL season
