= Tampa Bay Bandits =

American football team in the USFL

Logo

General information
- Founded: 1982
- Folded: 1986
- Headquartered: Tampa Stadium in Tampa, Florida
- Colors: Red, Silver, Black, White
- Mascot: Smokey

Personnel
- Owners: John F. Bassett (managing general partner); Stephen Arky (general partner); Burt Reynolds (general partner); Stan Gelt (general partner); 26 other partners
- Head coach: Steve Spurrier

Team history
- Tampa Bay Bandits (1983–1985)

Home fields
- Tampa Stadium (1983–1985)

League / conference affiliations
- United States Football League (1983–1985): Eastern Conference (1984–1985); Central Division (1983); Southern Division (1984)

Playoff appearances (2)
- 1984, 1985

The Tampa Bay Bandits were a professional American football team in the United States Football League (USFL) which was based in Tampa, Florida. The Bandits were a charter member of the USFL and was the only franchise to have the same principal owner (John F. Bassett), head coach (Steve Spurrier), and home field (Tampa Stadium) during the league's three seasons of play (1983–1985). The Bandits were one of the most successful teams in the short-lived spring football league both on the field and at the ticket booth. Spurrier's "Bandit Ball" offense led them to three winning seasons and two playoff appearances, and their exciting brand of play combined with innovative local marketing helped the Bandits lead the league in attendance. However, the franchise folded along with the rest of the USFL when the league suspended play after the 1985 season.

Prominent alumni from the Bandits include future NFL Pro Bowlers Nate Newton and Gary Anderson and coach Steve Spurrier, who spent 25 years coaching college football after his successful first stint as a head coach with the Bandits and was enshrined in the College Football Hall of Fame.

== History ==
=== Preparing to play ===
==== Origins ====
The Tampa Bay Bandits' primary founder was Canadian businessman John F. Bassett, who was still in litigation against the NFL over his previous Memphis Southmen franchise from the World Football League in the mid-1970s. Bassett was initially skeptical about getting into another football venture. However, he soon warmed up to the USFL after discovering that he was nowhere as well off as the other owners. While he had been by far the richest owner in the WFL, he realized that he would be one of the poorest owners in the USFL. Believing that the USFL was on far stronger financial ground than the WFL ever had been, he agreed to sign on. Bassett had a part-time home in the Tampa Bay Area, and when the USFL announced its twelve charter franchises in May 1982, Bassett was introduced as the majority owner of the as-yet unnamed team in Tampa along with Miami attorney Steve Arky.

==== Establishment in Tampa ====
After it was decided that the franchise would play in Tampa, several minority owners bought stakes, among them Hollywood star Burt Reynolds, a former college football player at Florida State who was one of the most popular motion picture actors in the world. The team was soon dubbed the "Bandits", and although it was widely assumed that the name referenced Reynolds' role in the hit Smokey and the Bandit movies, Bassett said that the mascot had been chosen before Reynolds joined the ownership group and instead came from the name of Bassett's daughter's German Shepherd. Reynolds was prominently involved in the Bandits' early marketing campaigns, and the cover of the team's first media guide featured a photo of the actor wearing a Bandits jacket and trucker hat.

Also building interest was the hiring of Steve Spurrier as head coach and offensive coordinator in November 1982. Spurrier was well known in the area as a Heisman Trophy-winning college star for the University of Florida Gators and the Tampa Bay Buccaneers' first starting quarterback, and had most recently spent three seasons as a record-setting offensive coordinator at Duke University before accepting his first head coaching job with the Bandits. Though Bassett had also considered several established coaches with NFL experience, he chose Spurrier due to his deep connections to the state of Florida and his reputation as an innovative young offensive coach; Spurrier was 37 when hired, making him the youngest head coach in professional football at the time. At Spurrier's introductory press conference, Bassett joked that he knew that he'd found the right coach when he discovered that the Spurrier family also had a dog named Bandit.

=== Bandit Ball ===
The Bandits began play in 1983 in Tampa Stadium, and were immediately more successful than the area's NFL franchise, the Tampa Bay Buccaneers, with whom they shared a home field (though the Bucs played in the fall and early winter while the Bandits played in the spring and early summer). The Bandits narrowly missed the playoffs in their first season and made the postseason the next two years. Spurrier's aggressive offense was usually one of the best in the league; Bandits players are among the USFL career leaders in touchdown passes (John Reaves, 4th), touchdown receptions (Eric Truvillion, 2nd), and rushing touchdowns (Gary Anderson, 3rd). However, an average defense and Bassett's insistence on adhering to the USFL's original financial plan while other franchises spent millions on free agent signings kept the team from serious championship contention.

The Bandits were also successful off the field. They drew the highest average attendance over the three-year history of the USFL, coming in second in attendance in 1983 and leading the league in that category in 1984 and 1985 with over 40,000 fans per game. Also, their memorabilia outsold that of the Buccaneers in the Tampa Bay area. A fan-friendly atmosphere (including a theme song, "Bandit Ball", penned and sung by Reynolds' friend Jerry Reed) was one factor. Another was the Bucs' futility during the period; they went 10–38 from 1983 to 1985—the start of a 12-year stretch of 10-loss seasons. Indeed, the Bandits were one of the few USFL teams that could have potentially driven their NFL counterparts out of town. Another key factor in the Bandits' success was the fact that there was no Major League Baseball team in Tampa at the time (the Tampa Bay Devil Rays would not debut for another decade), meaning that unlike other USFL teams, they did not have to compete with a baseball team for spectators. Due to broad local support, the Bandits were one of a very few USFL teams with a stable home and steady finances - they were the only franchise to have the same coach, owner, and home city throughout the league's three-year existence. Due to these factors, the Bandits are considered one of the few USFL teams that had the potential to be a viable venture had the league been better run. The Philadelphia Stars played Tampa Bay at Wembley Stadium in an exhibition game on July 21, 1984.

=== 1984 season ===
In week three of the 1984 season, the Bandits faced their inter-state rivals, the Jacksonville Bulls for the first time. Jacksonville was 1-1, after soundly defeating the Washington Federals and nearly beating the New Jersey Generals. Jacksonville, led by former Jets and Broncos quarterback Matt Robinson, raced out to a 12–0 lead. The Bandits stormed back to take a 25–18 lead. The Bulls came back to tie the game, but the Bandits won when Zenon Andrusyshyn kicked a field goal to give Tampa Bay a 28–25 lead.

When the season was over, quarterback John Reaves was the leading passer on the squad. Running backs Greg Boone and Gary Anderson ran for 1,009 and 1,008 yards respectively. Eric Truvillion lead the receivers with 1,044 yards on 70 catches and nine touchdowns.

==== 1984 schedule and results ====
Week	Date	Opponent	Result	Record	Venue	Attendance
Preseason
1	Bye					
2	February 4	vs. Washington Federals	W 28–9	1–0	Fort Lauderdale, Florida	17,225
3	February 11	Oklahoma Outlaws	W 15–6	2–0	Tampa Stadium	42,247
4	February 18	vs. Philadelphia Stars	W 22–17	3–0	Orlando, Florida	
Regular Season
1	February 26	Houston Gamblers	W 20–17	1–0	Tampa Stadium	42,915
2	March 2	at Arizona Wranglers	W 20–17	2–0	Sun Devil Stadium	31,264
3	March 10	Jacksonville Bulls	W 28–25	3–0	Tampa Stadium	51,274
4	March 18	at Denver Gold	L 30–36	3–1	Mile High Stadium	19,173
5	March 26	Birmingham Stallions	L 9–27	3–2	Tampa Stadium	37,899
6	April 1	at Philadelphia Stars	L 24–38	3–3	Veterans Stadium	30,270
7	April 7	Oakland Invaders	W 24–0	4–3	Tampa Stadium	58,777
8	April 16	at New Orleans Breakers	W 35–13	5–3	Louisiana Superdome	35,634
9	April 23	at Michigan Panthers	W 20–7	6–3	Pontiac Silverdome	31,433
10	April 28	Washington Federals	W 37–19	7–3	Tampa Stadium	42,810
11	May 5	at Jacksonville Bulls	W 31–13	8–3	Gator Bowl Stadium	71,174
12	May 14	Oklahoma Outlaws	W 28–21	9–3	Tampa Stadium	45,116
13	May 20	New Orleans Breakers	W 31–20	10–3	Tampa Stadium	42,592
14	May 25	at Memphis Showboats	L 21–31	10–4	Liberty Bowl Memorial Stadium	27,422
15	June 3	New Jersey Generals	W 30–14	11–4	Tampa Stadium	45,255
16	June 9	Memphis Showboats	W 42–24	12–4	Tampa Stadium	48,785
17	June 16	at Pittsburgh Maulers	W 21–9	13–4	Three Rivers Stadium	16,832
18	June 24	at Birmingham Stallions	W 17–16	14–4	Legion Field	24,500
Playoffs
Divisional Playoff	July 1	at Birmingham Stallions	L 17–36	0–1	Legion Field	32,000
Postseason Exhibition
Exhibition	July 21	vs. Philadelphia Stars	L 21–24	–	Wembley Stadium; London, England	21,000

=== 1985 season ===
==== 1985 schedule and results ====
Week	Date	Opponent	Result	Record	Venue	Attendance
Preseason
1	Bye					
2	February 9	New Jersey Generals	W 21–7	1–0	Tampa Stadium	32,370
3	February 16	vs. Baltimore Stars	W 28–26	2–0	Charlotte, North Carolina	20,000
Regular Season
1	February 23	Orlando Renegades	W 35–7	1–0	Tampa Stadium	45,095
2	March 3	Houston Gamblers	L 28–50	1–1	Tampa Stadium	42,291
3	March 10	at San Antonio Gunslingers	W 31–18	2–1	Alamo Stadium	21,822
4	March 16	Arizona Outlaws	W 23–13	3–1	Tampa Stadium	41,381
5	March 24	at New Jersey Generals	L 24–28	3–2	Giants Stadium	41,079
6	March 29	at Memphis Showboats	W 28–20	4–2	Liberty Bowl Memorial Stadium	23,952
7	April 6	Jacksonville Bulls	W 31–17	5–2	Tampa Stadium	51,286
8	April 15	Denver Gold	W 33–17	6–2	Tampa Stadium	54,267
9	April 21	at Birmingham Stallions	L 3–30	6–3	Legion Field	28,900
10	April 28	Baltimore Stars	W 28–14	7–3	Tampa Stadium	41,226
11	May 4	at Los Angeles Express	W 24–14	8–3	Los Angeles Memorial Coliseum	4,912
12	May 12	at Jacksonville Bulls	W 21–10	9–3	Gator Bowl Stadium	58,928
13	May 18	Memphis Showboats	L 14–38	9–4	Tampa Stadium	44,818
14	May 26	New Jersey Generals	L 24–30 (OT)	9–5	Tampa Stadium	44,539
15	June 1	at Orlando Renegades	L 7–37	9–6	Florida Citrus Bowl	26,847
16	June 8	at Portland Breakers	L 24–27	9–7	Civic Stadium	15,521
17	June 15	Birmingham Stallions	W 17–14	10–7	Tampa Stadium	42,131
18	June 23	at Baltimore Stars	L 10–38	10–8	Byrd Stadium	12,647
Playoffs
Quarterfinal	June 30	at Oakland Invaders	L 27–30	0–1	Oakland-Alameda County Coliseum	19,346

=== The end of the Bandits and of the USFL ===
Bandits' majority owner John Bassett was a strong proponent of the "Dixon Plan", which was an informal agreement among the USFL's founding owners to build a sustainable league through budgetary restraint and a commitment to spring football. However, to gain a competitive advantage and make a splash with fans, some teams almost immediately began to sign high-profile players to large contracts, sometimes entering into bidding wars with NFL teams with much deeper pockets. Because of this and other financial missteps, some USFL franchises lost substantial amounts of money. While Bassett and a few other owners refused to overspend on player contracts and kept their franchises relatively solvent, the league as a whole was increasingly unstable.

In April 1985, the USFL (led by New Jersey Generals owner Donald Trump) voted 12–2 to switch to a fall schedule for 1986, hoping to compete directly with the NFL and possibly force the more established league to accept a merger. Bassett, who had registered one of the two "nay" votes, immediately declared his intention to pull the Bandits out of the USFL and organize a new spring football league.

However, by mid-1985, the Bandits' ownership group was in disarray. Bassett was diagnosed with terminal brain cancer in early 1985 but continued to run the team's day to day operations. Under Bassett's direction, the front office signed several mediocre free agents to large contracts, most notably Bret Clark, a backup defensive back who was signed to a $1 million contract, one of the largest in team history. The Bandits also signed college All-American quarterback Randall Cunningham to a $2 million contract, but he never played for the team. Cunningham was chosen by the Philadelphia Eagles in the second round of the 1985 NFL draft, and after the collapse of the USFL, he signed with the Eagles and began his Hall of Fame career in Philadelphia. Bassett's uncharacteristically reckless financial decisions along with a "bizarre" proposal that his new spring league would involve multiple sports and increasingly erratic personal behavior led Spurrier and other team officials to quietly suspect that Bassett's ailment was affecting his ability to think rationally. During the same period, Bandits co-owner Steve Arky was implicated in the developing savings and loan crisis and his assets were seized by the Securities and Exchange Commission. Still claiming innocence, he died by suicide in July 1985.

With his business partner dead and his own health deteriorating, Bassett decided to sell the Bandits or merge the franchise with another Florida-based USFL team. However, Orlando Renegades owner Donald Dizney (previously a minority stakeholder in the Bandits) rejected a merger out of loyalty to Orlando, and Jacksonville Bulls owner Fred Bullard would only agree to a merger if Bassett retained a large investment in the merged franchise, so the proposals failed. In August 1985, minority owner Lee Scarfone, a local architect, agreed to purchase Bassett's and Arky's stakes and committed the Bandits to remaining in the USFL when the league moved to a fall schedule in 1986. Bassett retired from public life and died in May 1986.

On July 29, 1986, the result of the USFL's catastrophic antitrust lawsuit against the NFL put the future of the league in serious jeopardy. Several days later, a federal judge ruled that the Bandits still owed Bret Clark $159,980 in back pay from his $1 million contract. Since the team did not have the funds available to pay the judgement and Scarfone and Cunningham had depleted most of their personal assets in buying the franchise, the court placed a lien on the team. On August 4, 1986, law enforcement officers confiscated the Bandit's remaining assets - including weight-lifting equipment, helmets and uniforms, office furniture, and merchandise in the team store - to pay off the debt, effectively ending the franchise. Coincidentally, the USFL officially suspended operations on the same day, effectively ending the league as a whole.

== Prominent Tampa Bay Bandits ==
- Gary Anderson
- Zenon Andrusyshyn
- Danny Buggs
- Martin Cox
- Jim Fitzpatrick
- Zac Henderson
- Lex Luger
- Nate Newton
- Chuck Pitcock
- Sam Platt
- John Reaves
- Ron Simmons
- Steve Spurrier, head coach

== Single-season leaders ==
Rushing Yards: 1206 (1985), Gary Anderson

Receiving Yards: 1146 (1983), Danny Buggs

Passing Yards: 4183 (1985), John Reaves

== Season-by-season results ==
Season records
Season	W	L	T	Finish	Playoff results
1983	11	7	0	3rd Central	--
1984	14	4	0	2nd EC Southern	Lost Quarterfinal (Birmingham)
1985	10	8	0	5th EC	Lost Quarterfinal (Oakland)
Totals	35	21	0	(including playoffs)	

== Proposed revivals ==
- In February 2014, the A-11 Football League (A11FL) announced its intention to revive the Tampa Bay Bandits name and logos as one of the eight charter franchises for a new spring league. The A11FL also announced plans to feature the revived Bandits in a "showcase game" to be held at Tampa's Raymond James Stadium in May 2014. However, these plans did not come to fruition, as the A11FL never took the field. The showcase game was cancelled in March 2014, and the league went on permanent "hiatus" in July 2014.
- The Spring League acquired the trademarks of the Bandits in 2021 as part of a planned relaunch of the USFL and included a Bandits squad in its 2022 USFL season. The 2022 Bandits are based in Tampa Bay in name only, as the entire league plays all of its games in Birmingham, Alabama.
