= 1983 Michigan Panthers season =

Defunct football team in the USFL

- Owner: A. Alfred Taubman
- General manager: Jim Spavital
- Head coach: Jim Stanley
- Home stadium: Pontiac Silverdome

Results
- Record: 12–6
- Division place: 1st Central Division
- Playoffs: Won Divisional Playoffs (vs. Invaders) 37–21; Won USFL Championship (vs. Stars) 24–22

Michigan held its first training camp at City Island Stadium in Daytona Beach, Florida, sifting through over 75 players. On Monday, March 7, 1983; the Panthers opened the season with a 9–7 win over the Birmingham Stallions at Legion Field in Birmingham, Alabama. This was the first professional football game ever broadcast on ESPN. Montenegrin kicker (via Central Michigan) Novo Bojovic kicked 3 Field Goals 49,49 and the winning field goal from 48 yards out in the waning moments.

The Panthers then dropped their next four contests, losing on March 12 to the Tampa Bay Bandits (19–7); Mar. 19 at home to the Oakland Invaders (33–27); Mar. 27 at the Washington Federals (22–16 in OT) and April 4 at home to the Denver Gold (29–21). Their slow start was attributed mostly due to a very porous offensive line that struggled to create holes or time for their offensive stars. Management addressed the issue by signing a bevy of experienced offensive linemen in OT Ray Pinney (Pittsburgh Steelers), OG Tyrone McGriff (Pittsburgh Steelers) and OG Thom Dornbrook (NY Giants). Dornbrook and McGriff would both make USFL all-league teams in 1983.

The Panthers had a six-game winning streak. Then, on May 23, they and the Birmingham Stallions were tied 20–20 in the fourth quarter. Michigan would have had the lead, but the extra point attempt was blocked. The game went into overtime and was won by Birmingham thanks to a 46-yard field goal by Stallions placekicker Scott Norwood.

The Panthers would bounce back with a 42–7 thrashing of the stellar Tampa Bay Bandits, coached by future Florida Gators head coach Steve Spurrier. The additions on the offensive line, combined with installing rookie Bobby Hebert as quarterback, helped the Panthers win 11 of their next 13 contests to finish with a 12–6 record. They actually tied the Chicago Blitz for the best record in the Central Division, but were awarded the division title after sweeping the Blitz in the regular season.

In the playoffs, the Panthers hosted the Western Division champion Oakland Invaders before a USFL-record crowd of 60,237. The Panthers' decisive 37–21 victory vaulted them to the inaugural USFL Championship Game in Denver, Colorado.

On July 17, 1983, the Panthers captured the USFL's first championship with a 24–22 win over the Atlantic Division champion Philadelphia Stars. QB Bobby Hebert hit WR Anthony Carter on a 48-yard touchdown strike with 3:11 left in the fourth quarter for what proved to be the deciding score. Hebert was named MVP of the game, throwing for 319 yards and three touchdowns.

The Panthers' late season surge (counting the playoffs, they went 13–2 to finish the season) was fueled by the addition of NFL-comparable talent at several positions. Indeed, they were one of three USFL teams, along with the Stars and Blitz, that observers believed could have made a good account of themselves in the NFL. It came at a high price, however; they spent $6 million during the season—three times what USFL founder David Dixon recommended that a team spend in a single season.

== Personnel ==
=== Staff ===
1983 Michigan Panthers staff
Front office: Owner – A. Alfred Taubman; General manager – Jim Spavital; Head coaches: Head coach – Jim Stanley; Offensive coaches: Offensive Coordinator - George Dickson; Quarterbacks – Bob Leahy; Running backs – George Dickson; Wide receivers – Bob Leahy; Tight ends – Kent Stephenson; Offensive line – Kent Stephenson	Defensive coaches: Defensive Coordinator - Dick Roach; Defensive line – Pete Rodriguez; Linebackers – Larry Coyer; Defensive backs – Dick Roach; Special teams coaches: Special teams coordinator – Mike Long

=== Roster ===
1983 Michigan Panthers roster
Quarterbacks (QB): 11 Bobby Hebert; 10 Whit Taylor; Running backs (RB): 39 Mike Hagen; 28 Ken Lacy; 33 Cleo Miller; 40 John Williams; Wide receivers (WR): 1 Anthony Carter; 29 Derek Holloway; 83 Frank McClain; 86 Lonell Phea; 81 Jerome Staley; Tight ends (TE): 89 Mike Cobb; 88 Donnie Echols; 84 McDonald Oden	Offensive linemen (OL): 54 Matt Braswell G/C; 63 Thom Dornbrook G; 73 Greg Fairchild T/G; 70 Chris Godfrey T; 61 Tyrone McGriff G; 75 Tony Osbun T; 74 Ray Pinney T; 55 Wayne Radloff C; Defensive linemen (DL): 67 Ira Albright NT; 90 Curtis Anderson DE; 76 John Banaszak DE; 72 Phil Dokes DE; 98 Allen Hughes DE; 99 Ronnie Paggett DE; 79 Wes Roberts DE; 65 David Tipton NT	Linebackers (LB): 50 Ray Bentley ILB; 52 Kyle Borland OLB; 62 Andy Cannavino ILB; 58 Will Cokeley ILB/OLB; 57 John Corker OLB; 53 Mike Edwards OLB; 59 Robert Pennywell ILB; 51 Ricky Young ILB; Defensive backs (DB): 25 John Arnaud FS; 22 Clarence Chapman CB; 21 Oliver Davis CB; 26 Elbert Gray CB; 31 David Greenwood SS/P; 45 Tom Moriarty SS; Special teams (ST): 3 Novo Bojovic K; 19 Bob Grupp P	Practice squad: -- Eugene Byrd WR; -- Hilton Dawson LB; 30 Tony Ellis RB; 20 Larry McCrimmon WR; -- Mark Miller QB; -- Lawrence Texada RB; Reserve: 77 Jeff Jackson DE (IR); -- Dan Lloyd LB (IR); 43 Terry Miller RB (IR); 23 Ron Osborn CB/S (IR); -- Jay Repko TE (NF-Inj.); -- Kevin Sloan T (Exempt); 68 Mike Weston G/C (IR); -- Craig Wederquist T (IR); Rookies in italics

== USFL draft ==
Round	Pick	Player	Position	School
1	10	David Greenwood	Safety	Wisconsin
2	15	Wayne Radloff	Center	Georgia
3	34	Bobby Hebert	Quarterback	Northwestern State
4	39	Paul Skansi	Wide Receiver	Washington
5	58	Whit Taylor	Quarterback	Vanderbilt
6	69	Ken Lacy	Running Back	Tulsa
7	82	Craig Wederquist	Offensive Tackle	Drake
8	87	Ron Hopkins	Defensive Back	Murray State
9	106	Stanley Washington	Wide Receiver	TCU
10	111	Russ Graham	Offensive Tackle	Oklahoma State
12	135	Larry McCrimmon	Quarterback	Cameron
13	154	Kevin Sloan	Offensive Tackle	Washington State
14	159	John Williams	Running Back	Wisconsin

== Schedule ==
Week	Date	Opponent	Result	Record	Venue	Attendance
1	March 7	at Birmingham Stallions	W 9–7	1–0	Legion Field	30,305
2	March 12	at Tampa Bay Bandits	7–19	1–1	Tampa Stadium	38,789
3	March 19	Oakland Invaders	L 27–33	1–2	Pontiac Silverdome	28,952
4	March 27	at Washington Federals	L 16–22 (OT)	1–3	RFK Stadium	11,404
5	April 4	Denver Gold	L 21–29	1–4	Pontiac Silverdome	11,279
6	April 10	at New Jersey Generals	W 21–6	2–4	Giants Stadium	17,648
7	April 17	Chicago Blitz	W 17–12	3–4	Pontiac Silverdome	11,634
8	April 23	Los Angeles Express	W 34–24	4–4	Pontiac Silverdome	13,184
9	May 1	at Boston Breakers	W 28–24	5–4	Nickerson Field	10,971
10	May 7	at Arizona Wranglers	W 21–10	6–4	Sun Devil Stadium	20,423
11	May 16	New Jersey Generals	W 31–24	7–4	Pontiac Silverdome	32,862
12	May 23	Birmingham Stallions	L 20–23 (OT)	7–5	Pontiac Silverdome	20,042
13	May 30	Tampa Bay Bandits	W 43–7	8–5	Pontiac Silverdome	23,976
14	June 5	at Philadelphia Stars	L 20–29	8–6	Veterans Stadium	19,727
15	June 12	at Los Angeles Express	W 42–17	9–6	Los Angeles Memorial Coliseum	16,023
16	June 20	Washington Federals	W 27–25	10–6	Pontiac Silverdome	26,418
17	June 26	at Chicago Blitz	W 34–19	11–6	Soldier Field	25,041
18	July 3	Arizona Wranglers	W 33–7	12–6	Pontiac Silverdome	31,905

=== Playoff schedule ===
Round	Date	Opponent	Result	Record	Location
Divisional Playoffs	July 10	Oakland Invaders	W 37–21	1–0	Pontiac Silverdome
USFL Championship	July 17	Philadelphia Stars	W 24–22	2–0	Mile High Stadium

== Standings ==
USFL Central Division
	W	L	T	PCT	DIV	PF	PA	STK
Michigan Panthers	12	6	0	.667	4–2	451	337	W4
Chicago Blitz	12	6	0	.667	4–2	456	271	W1
Tampa Bay Bandits	11	7	0	.611	2–4	363	378	L1
Birmingham Stallions	9	9	0	.500	2–4	343	326	W1

== Awards ==
Award	Winner	Position
All-USFL Team	Ray Pinney	OT
All-USFL Team	Thom Dornbrook	G
All-USFL Team	Bobby Hebert	QB
All-USFL Team	John Corker	LB
Defensive Player of the Year	John Corker	LB
USFL Outstanding Quarterback	Bobby Hebert	QB
USFL Passing Touchdowns Leader	Bobby Hebert	QB
USFL QBR Leader	Bobby Hebert	QB
USFL Championship Game MVP	Bobby Hebert	QB

== Final statistics ==
=== Offense ===
Panthers Passing
	C/ATT	Yds	TD	INT
Bobby Hebert	257/451	3568	27	17
Whit Taylor	17/34	353	1	0
Ken Lacy	1/1	38	1	0
Rick Partridge	0/1	0	0	0
Panthers Rushing
	Car	Yds	TD	LG
Ken Lacy	232	1180	6	59
John Williams	153	624	12	31
Cleo Miller	94	374	0	19
Tony Ellis	46	158	0	25
Terry Miller	33	123	3	22
Mike Hagen	13	68	0	16
Bobby Hebert	28	35	3	9
Whit Taylor	3	10	0	16
Jimmy Hargrove	2	4	0	3
Anthony Carter	3	1	0	9
Panthers Receiving
	Rec	Yds	TD	LG
Mike Cobb	61	674	5	31
Anthony Carter	60	1181	9	81
Ken Lacy	40	433	2	39
Derek Holloway	39	811	11	67
Donnie Echols	20	196	0	27
Frank McClain	19	264	0	39
Cleo Miller	12	92	0	28
John Williams	8	80	1	53
Tony Ellis	5	55	0	27
Jerome Staley	3	27	0	11
Mike Hagen	3	25	0	14
Jimmy Hargrove	2	24	0	17
Lonell Phea	1	14	0	14
Terry Miller	1	9	0	9
Ray Pinney	1	2	1	2

=== Defense ===
Panthers Sacks
	Sacks
John Corker	28.0
David Tipton	12.0
Ronnie Paggett	9.5
Allen Hughes	4.0
Phil Dokes	2.5
Mike Edwards	2.0
Kyle Borland	2.0
Ira Albright	2.0
Robert Pennywell	1.0
David Greenwood	1.0
Ray Bentley	1.0
John Banaszak	1.0
Andy Cannavino	1.0

Panthers Interceptions
	Int	Yds	TD	LG	PD
Robert Pennywell	4	23	0	16	
Ron Osborn	3	7	0	7	
David Greenwood	2	31	0	31	
Oliver Davis	2	24	0	16	
John Corker	2	22	0	11	
Ray Bentley	2	11	0	11	
John Arnaud	2	7	0	4	
Andy Cannavino	1	9	0	9	
Kyle Borland	1	0	0	0	
Clarence Chapman	1	0	0	0	
Freddie Logan	1	0	0	0	

Panthers Fumbles
	FF	Fmb	FR	Yds	TD
Ken Lacy		10	1	0	0
Bobby Hebert		8	2	0	0
Anthony Carter		6	3	0	0
John Williams		5	1	0	0
Eric Robinson		4	1	0	0
Whit Taylor		3	2	0	0
Tony Ellis		3	1	0	0
John Corker		2	6	0	100
David Greenwood		2	2	0	4
Lonell Phea		2	1	0	0
Mike Cobb		1	0	0	0
Mike Hagen		1	0	0	0
Cleo Miller		1	0	0	0
Terry Miller		1	0	0	0

=== Special teams ===
Panthers Kicking
	FGM–FGA	XPM–XPA
Novo Bojovic	18-19	49-54

Panthers Punting
	Pnt	Yds	Lng	Blck
David Greenwood	37	1532	56	0
Rick Partridge	23	905	53	0
Herman Weaver	16	601	51	0
Bob Grupp	1	28	28	0

Panthers Kick Returns
	Ret	Yds	TD	Lng
Lonell Phea	14	307	0	39
John Williams	12	290	0	43
Derek Holloway	13	254	0	31
Ron Ingram	10	206	0	26
Jerome Staley	5	88	0	21
Tony Ellis	2	30	0	24
Mike Hagen	2	30	0	18
David Greenwood	1	3	0	3
Robert Pennywell	1	0	0	0
John Arnaud	1	0	0	0

Panthers Punt Returns
	Ret	Yds	TD	Lng
Anthony Carter	40	387	1	57
Lonell Phea	8	87	0	23
Derek Holloway	1	–2	0	–2
Ron Ingram	1	0	0	0
