= List of Drake Bulldogs football honorees =

The following Bulldogs have been selected as First Team All-Americans, to participate in college all-star teams, or were members of the Drake All-Century Team.

== First Team All-Americans ==
Player	Committee	Position	Year(s) chosen
Ted Sloane	All Sports Magazine	End	1925
Johnny Bright	American Football Coaches Association	RB	1951
Mike Samples	American Football Coaches Association	DT	1972
Pat Dunsmore	American Football Coaches Association	TE	1981
Craig Wederquist	Associated Press	OL	1982
Matt Garvis	American Football Coaches Association	LB	1995
Mike Foster	American Football Coaches Association	DL	1999, 2000
Billy Cundiff	American Football Coaches Association	K	2000, 2001
Aaron Overton	Sports Network	WR	2002
Ira Vandever	Sports Network	QB	2002
Grant Knowles	Sports Network	OG	2004
James Mickley	Sports Network	TE	2004
Scott Phaydavong	Sports Network	RB	2004, 2005, 2006
Andy Green	Sports Network	S	2006, 2007
Dain Taylor	American Football Coaches Association	DL	2010

== All-Star game appearances ==
Player	Game	Year(s) chosen
Ted Sloane	East–West Shrine Game	1925
Herb Hedlund	East–West Shrine Game	1938
Pug Manders	East–West Shrine Game & Chicago Tribune All-Star Game	1939
Ralph Gruben	North–South Senior All-Star Game	1946
Tom Bienemann	North–South Senior All-Star Game	1950
Dick Steere	North–South Senior All-Star Game	1950
Johnny Bright	East–West Shrine Game	1951
Tom Newell	Copper Bowl	1958
Karl Kassulke	Blue–Gray Football Classic	1962
Jack Matiar	Blue–Gray Football Classic	1978
Jack Matiar	Senior Bowl	1979
Rick Casko	Blue–Gray Football Classic	1980
John Ware	Blue–Gray Football Classic	1981
Dennis McKnight	Senior Bowl	1981
Billy Cundiff	East Coast Bowl	2002
Aaron Overton	East Coast Bowl	2002
Grant Knowles	East Coast Bowl	2004
Scott Phaydavong	East Coast Bowl	2006
Eric Saubert	East–West Shrine Game & Senior Bowl	2016

== All-Century Team ==
Player	Position	Years for Bulldogs
Bud Adams	Lineman	1939–1941
Herb Hedlund	Lineman	1936–1938
Dennis McKnight	G	1923–1927
Charlie Pell	Lineman	1904–1906
Mike Samples	DT	1970–1972
Marv Shearer	Lineman	1954–1957
Pete Solverson	Lineman	1970–1973
Dick Steere	G	1947–1950
Craig Wederquist	OL	1979–1982
Joe Worobec	G	1970–1972
Tom Bienemann	DE	1947–1950
William Bliss	End	1898–1901
Pat Dunsmore	TE	1979–1982
Jerry Mertens	CB	1954–1957
Manley Sarnowsky	End	1963–1966
Ted Sloane	End	1923–1925
Doug Winslow	WR	1969–1972
Bill Boelter	Back	1921–1923
Johnny Bright	HB/LB	1949–1951
Karl Kassulke	S	1961–1962
Lynn King	Back	1928–1930
Roger LaBrasca	Back	1954–1957
Pug Manders	FB / HB	1936–1938
Duane Miller	DB/WR	1966–1969
Floyd Miller	Back	1947–1950
Dick Nesbitt	RB	1927–1929
Glen Simons	Back	1911–1913
Amero Ware	Back	1979–1982
Buford Waterhouse	Back	1955–1956
Felix Wright	DB	1977–1980
Waldo Don Carlos	C	1928–1930
Russell Sprong	C	1915–1919

== See also ==
- Drake Bulldogs
