= 1983 USFL draft =

Collegiate draft of the United States Football League

General information
- Date: January 4, 1983
- Location: Grand Hyatt Hotel, New York

Overview
- 288 total selections in 24 rounds
- League: USFL
- First selection: Dan Marino, QB; Los Angeles Express

The 1983 USFL draft was the first collegiate draft of the U.S Football League (USFL). It took place on January 4, 1983, at the Grand Hyatt Hotel in New York.

== Player selections ==
= All-Star
= USFL MVP

Round	Pick #	USFL team	Player	Position	College
1	1	Los Angeles Express	Dan Marino	QB	Pittsburgh
1	2	Chicago Blitz	Tim Spencer	RB	Ohio State
1	3	Birmingham Stallions	Reggie Collier	QB	Southern Miss
1	4	Washington Federals	Craig James	RB	SMU
1	5	New Jersey Generals	Gary Anderson	RB	Arkansas
1	6	Arizona Wranglers	Eric Dickerson	RB	SMU
1	7	Oakland Invaders	Billy Ray Smith Jr.	DE	Arkansas
1	8	Philadelphia Stars	Irv Eatman	T	UCLA
1	9	Denver Gold	Demetrious Johnson	S	Missouri
1	10	Michigan Panthers	David Greenwood	S	Wisconsin
1	11	Chicago Blitz (from Boston)	Trumaine Johnson	WR	Grambling State
1	12	Tampa Bay Bandits	Jimbo Covert	T	Pittsburgh
2	13	Tampa Bay Bandits	Jimmy Payne	DE	Georgia
2	14	Boston Breakers	Leonard Smith	DB	McNeese State
2	15	Michigan Panthers	Wayne Radloff	C	Georgia
2	16	Denver Gold	Michael Haddix	RB	Mississippi State
2	17	Philadelphia Stars	Bart Oates	C	BYU
2	18	Oakland Invaders	Glen Young	WR	Mississippi State
2	19	Chicago Blitz	Johnny Hector	RB	Texas A&M
2	20	Birmingham Stallions	Steve Korte	G	Arkansas
2	21	Washington Federals	Tim Lewis	DB	Pittsburgh
2	22	New Jersey Generals	Mark Stewart	LB	Washington
2	23	Arizona Wranglers	Gary Williams	WR	Ohio State
2	24	New Jersey Generals	Darryl Talley	LB	West Virginia
3	25	Los Angeles Express	Ray Horton	DB	Washington
3	26	Arizona Wranglers	Sid Abramowitz	T	Tulsa
3	27	New Jersey Generals	Ramsey Dardar	DL	LSU
3	28	Washington Federals	Stephen Starring	QB	McNeese State
3	29	Birmingham Stallions	Gary Lewis	DT	Oklahoma State
3	30	Chicago Blitz	Frank Minnifield	DB	Louisville
3	31	Oakland Invaders	Dave Lutz	T	Georgia Tech
3	32	Philadelphia Stars	Greg Hill	DB	Oklahoma State
3	33	Denver Gold	John Harper	LB	Southern Illinois
3	34	Michigan Panthers	Bobby Hebert	QB	Northwestern State (Louisiana)
3	35	Boston Breakers	Clint Sampson	WR	San Diego State
3	36	Tampa Bay Bandits	Anthony Allen	WR	Washington
4	37	Birmingham Stallions	Steve Moore	G	Tennessee State
4	38	Boston Breakers	George Harris	LB	Houston
4	39	Michigan Panthers	Paul Skansi	WR	Washington
4	40	Denver Gold	Mark Kirchner	G	Baylor
4	41	Philadelphia Stars	Antonio Gibson	DB	Cincinnati
4	42	Oakland Invaders	Vince Newsome	DB	Washington
4	43	Chicago Blitz	Matt VandenBoom	DB	Wisconsin
4	44	Tampa Bay Bandits	Karl Nelson	T	Iowa State
4	45	Washington Federals	Bob Winckler	T	Wisconsin
4	46	New Jersey Generals	Wes Hopkins	DB	SMU
4	47	Chicago Blitz	Rob Fada	G	Pittsburgh
4	48	Los Angeles Express	Mark Bortz	DT	Iowa
5	49	Los Angeles Express	Tom Ramsey	QB	UCLA
5	50	Washington Federals	Mike Hohensee	QB	Minnesota
5	51	New Jersey Generals	Wayne Harris	OG	Mississippi State
5	52	Arizona Wranglers	Blanchard Montgomery	LB	UCLA
5	53	Tampa Bay Bandits	Chris Castor	WR	Duke
5	54	Washington Federals	Doug Howard	T	NC State
5	55	Oakland Invaders	Jerome Foster	DT	Ohio State
5	56	Philadelphia Stars	Allen Harvin	RB	Cincinnati
5	57	Washington Federals	Brett Miller	T	Iowa
5	58	Michigan Panthers	Whit Taylor	QB	Vanderbilt
5	59	Boston Breakers	John Tuggle	RB	California
5	60	New Jersey Generals	Mark Cooper	T	Miami (FL)
6	62	Boston Breakers	John Courtney	DT	South Carolina State
6	63	Washington Federals	George Parker	RB	Norfolk State
6	64	Denver Gold	Scott Collie	WR	BYU
6	65	Philadelphia Stars	Tony Caldwell	LB	Washington
6	66	Oakland Invaders	Ken O'Brien	QB	UC Davis
6	67	Los Angeles Express	Jim Mills	T	Hawaii
6	68	Birmingham Stallions	James Lockette	DT	Missouri
6	69	Michigan Panthers	Ken Lacy	RB	Tulsa
6	70	New Jersey Generals	Randy Grimes	C	Baylor
6	71	Arizona Wranglers	Randy Jostes	DT	Missouri
6	72	Los Angeles Express	Jojo Townsell	WR	UCLA
7	73	Los Angeles Express	John Barnett	RB	Oregon Tech
7	74	Arizona Wranglers	Steve Brown	DB	Oregon
7	75	New Jersey Generals	Kent Hull	C	Mississippi State
7	76	Washington Federals	Perry Williams	DB	NC State
7	77	Birmingham Stallions	Mike Williams	RB	Mississippi College
7	78	Los Angeles Express	David Croudip	DB	San Diego State
7	79	Oakland Invaders	Greg Townsend	DE	TCU
7	80	Philadelphia Stars	Jimmy Turner	DB	UCLA
7	81	Denver Gold	Mark Witte	TE	North Texas
7	82	Michigan Panthers	Craig Wederquist	T	Drake
7	83	Boston Breakers	Dan Dufour	C	UCLA
7	84	Tampa Bay Bandits	Tim Krumrie	T	Wisconsin
8	85	Tampa Bay Bandits	Dave Puzzuoli	DT	Pittsburgh
8	86	Boston Breakers	Todd Seabaugh	LB	San Diego State
8	87	Michigan Panthers	Ron Hopkins	DB	Murray State
8	88	Denver Gold	Kevin Potter	DB	Missouri
8	89	Philadelphia Stars	Richard Dent	DE	Tennessee State
8	90	Oakland Invaders	Dokie Williams	WR	UCLA
8	91	Los Angeles Express	Joe Bears	G	SMU
8	92	Birmingham Stallions	Pat Saindon	G	Vanderbilt
8	93	Philadelphia Stars	Rich Kraynak	LB	Pittsburgh
8	94	New Jersey Generals	Maurice Carthon	RB	Arkansas
8	95	Arizona Wranglers	Anthony Edgar	RB	Hawaii
8	96	Los Angeles Express	Wymon Henderson	DB	Nevada-Las Vegas
9	97	Los Angeles Express	Jimmy Gayle	RB	Ohio State
9	98	Arizona Wranglers	Paul Coty	C	Washington
9	99	New Jersey Generals	Marlin Russell	LB	Toledo
9	101	Birmingham Stallions	Mike Mitchell	DB	Tennessee-Chattanooga
9	102	Boston Breakers	Tom Holmoe	DB	BYU
9	103	Oakland Invaders	Earnest Jackson	RB	Texas A&M
9	104	Philadelphia Stars	James Caver	WR	Missouri
9	105	Denver Gold	Glenn Ford	RB	Lenoir-Rhyne
9	106	Michigan Panthers	Stanley Washington	WR	TCU
9	107	Boston Breakers	Marcus Marek	LB	Ohio State
9	108	Tampa Bay Bandits	Don Bailey	C	Miami (FL)
10	109	Tampa Bay Bandits	Leonard Marshall	DT	LSU
10	110	Boston Breakers	Lorenzo Bouier	RB	Maine
10	111	Michigan Panthers	Russ Graham	OT	Oklahoma State
10	112	Denver Gold	Darrell Green	DB	Texas A&M-Kingsville
10	113	Philadelphia Stars	Don Dow	T	Washington
10	114	Washington Federals	Jeff Nyce	C	NC State
10	115	Boston Breakers	Mark Brown	LB	Purdue
10	116	Birmingham Stallions	Willard Murphy	LB	Tennessee-Chattanooga
10	117	Washington Federals	Dennis Fowlkes	LB	West Virginia
10	118	New Jersey Generals	Charles Benson	DE	Baylor
10	119	Arizona Wranglers	Tim Joiner	LB	LSU
10	120	Los Angeles Express	John Blacksill	C	Fresno State
11	121	Los Angeles Express	Cormac Carney	WR	UCLA
11	122	Arizona Wranglers	Phil Smith	WR	San Diego State
11	123	New Jersey Generals	Danny Walters	DB	Arkansas
11	124	Washington Federals	Kiki DeAyala	LB	Texas
11	125	Birmingham Stallions	Tim Bumgarner	T	Duke
11	126	Chicago Blitz	Pat Dunsmore	TE	Drake
11	127	Oakland Invaders	Harvey Childress	LB	Southern Oregon
11	128	Philadelphia Stars	Gary Worthy	RB	Wilmington
11	129	Denver Gold	Amos Donaldson	G	Kansas State
11	130	Washington Federals	Steve Bird	WR	Eastern Kentucky
11	131	Boston Breakers	Walter Ross	RB	Northern State (Colorado)
11	132	Tampa Bay Bandits	Bob Oxendine	T	Duke
12	133	Tampa Bay Bandits	Al Richardson	LB	LSU
12	134	Boston Breakers	Herkie Walls	WR	Texas
12	135	Michigan Panthers	Larry McCrimmon	QB	Cameron
12	136	Denver Gold	Larry White	DE	Jackson State
12	137	Philadelphia Stars	Allama Matthews	TE	Vanderbilt
12	138	Oakland Invaders	Cedric Mack	DB	Baylor
12	139	Boston Breakers	Jeff Turk	DB	Boise State
12	140	Birmingham Stallions	Malcolm Scott	TE	LSU
12	141	Washington Federals	Dee Dee Hoggard	DB	NC State
12	142	New Jersey Generals	Bryan Millard	T	Texas
12	143	Arizona Wranglers	Sam Merriman	LB	Idaho
12	144	Los Angeles Express	Tony Boddie	RB	Montana State
13	145	Los Angeles Express	Don Turner	DB	Fresno State
13	146	Arizona Wranglers	Vince Stroth	T	BYU
13	147	New Jersey Generals	Ricky Williamson	DE	Mars Hill
13	148	Washington Federals	William Wall	TE	Virginia Union
13	149	Birmingham Stallions	Major Everett	RB	Mississippi College
13	150	Chicago Blitz	Ron Versnik	C	Wisconsin
13	151	Oakland Invaders	Reggie Gipson	RB	Alabama A&M
13	152	Philadelphia Stars	John Walker	DT	Nebraska-Omaha
13	153	Denver Gold	Prince McJunkins	QB	Wichita State
13	154	Michigan Panthers	Kevin Sloan	T	Washington State
13	155	Boston Breakers	Darral Hambrick	WR	Nevada-Las Vegas
13	156	Tampa Bay Bandits	Greg Boone	RB	Duke
14	157	Tampa Bay Bandits	Willie Canady	DB	Fort Valley State
14	158	Boston Breakers	Charles Young	DT	North Texas
14	159	Michigan Panthers	John Williams	RB	Wisconsin
14	160	Denver Gold	Tim Rucks	T	Carthage
14	161	Philadelphia Stars	Sean Landeta	P	Towson
14	162	Oakland Invaders	Charles Tucker	G	Austin Peay State
14	163	Chicago Blitz	Jim Kelly	QB	Miami (FL)
14	164	Birmingham Stallions	Gregg Lowery	P	Jacksonville State
14	165	Washington Federals	Jody Schulz	LB	East Carolina
14	166	New Jersey Generals	James Britt	DB	LSU
14	167	Arizona Wranglers	Mike Durden	DB	UCLA
14	168	Los Angeles Express	Gary Moten	LB	SMU
15	169	Los Angeles Express	Maceo Fifer	T	Houston
15	170	Arizona Wranglers	Alan Risher	QB	LSU
15	171	New Jersey Generals	Todd Hallstrom	T	Minnesota
15	172	Washington Federals	Rocky Belk	WR	Miami (FL)
15	173	Birmingham Stallions	Charles Martin	DT	West Alabama
15	174	Chicago Blitz	Matt Hernandez	DT	Purdue
15	175	Philadelphia Stars	Albert Lewis	DB	Grambling State
15	176	Philadelphia Stars	Marlin Evans	LB	Indiana
15	177	Denver Gold	Gregg Harmon	LB	Houston
15	178	Michigan Panthers	Mike Green	LB	Oklahoma State
15	179	Boston Breakers	Bill Fallon	LB	Cal Poly (Pomona)
15	180	Tampa Bay Bandits	John Canei	T	Miami (FL)
16	181	Tampa Bay Bandits	Willie Gillespie	WR	Tennessee-Chattanooga
16	182	Boston Breakers	Tim Cowan	QB	Washington
16	183	Michigan Panthers	Harold Brown	RB	Iowa State
16	184	Denver Gold	Clenzie Pierson	DT	Rice
16	185	Philadelphia Stars	J.C. Pelusi	DT	Pittsburgh
16	186	Oakland Invaders	Eric Moran	T	Washington
16	187	Chicago Blitz	Reggie Roby	P	Iowa
16	188	Birmingham Stallions	Mike Turner	G	LSU
16	189	Washington Federals	Richard Tharpe	DE	Louisville
16	190	New Jersey Generals	Steve Cox	G	Tulsa
16	191	New Jersey Generals	Tony Chickillo	DT	Miami (FL)
16	192	Los Angeles Express	Tim Harris	RB	Washington State
17	193	Los Angeles Express	Doug Reed	DT	San Diego State
17	194	Arizona Wranglers	Ray Cattage	DE	Washington
17	195	New Jersey Generals	Jeff Christensen	QB	Eastern Illinois
17	196	Washington Federals	Jamie Pope	RB	Gardner-Webb
17	197	Birmingham Stallions	John Clemens	DE	Vanderbilt
17	198	Chicago Blitz	Chuck Ehin	DE	BYU
17	199	Oakland Invaders	Jesse Sapolu	G	Hawaii
17	200	Philadelphia Stars	Bryan Thomas	RB	Pittsburgh
17	201	Denver Gold	Joe Hines	LB	TCU
17	202	Michigan Panthers	John Arnaud	DB	Iowa State
17	203	Boston Breakers	Thomas Hopkins	T	Alabama State
17	204	Tampa Bay Bandits	Ray Robinson	DE	Houston
18	205	Tampa Bay Bandits	Bill Elko	DT	LSU
18	206	Boston Breakers	Mickey Cochran	G	Cameron
18	207	Michigan Panthers	Will Cokeley	LB	Kansas State
18	208	Denver Gold	Tim Moore	DE	Southern University
18	209	Philadelphia Stars	Glenn Cobb	LB	Ohio State
18	210	Oakland Invaders	Charles Mann	LB	Nevada-Reno
18	211	Chicago Blitz	Andy Gibler	TE	Missouri
18	212	Birmingham Stallions	Scott McCall	G	Abilene Christian
18	213	Washington Federals	Jeff Brown	DB	Liberty
18	214	New Jersey Generals	Dana Moore	K	Mississippi State
18	215	Arizona Wranglers	Carlos Scott	C	UTEP
18	216	Los Angeles Express	Wayne Faalafua	G	BYU
19	217	Los Angeles Express	Duane Galloway	DB	Arizona State
19	218	Arizona Wranglers	Darryl Clark	RB	Texas
19	219	New Jersey Generals	Norris Brown	TE	Georgia
19	220	Washington Federals	Mike Thurman	DB	James Madison
19	221	Birmingham Stallions	Eddie Ray Walker	DB	Southern Miss
19	222	Chicago Blitz	Shamus McDonough	DT	Iowa State
19	223	Oakland Invaders	Vince Randall	T	Portland State
19	224	Philadelphia Stars	Victor Oatis	WR	Northwestern State (Louisiana)
19	225	Denver Gold	Darryl Goosby	TE	Cincinnati
19	226	Michigan Panthers	Steve Bisch	T	Minnesota
19	227	Boston Breakers	Mark Tuinei	DT	Hawaii
19	228	Tampa Bay Bandits	Bob Norris	G	Eastern Illinois
20	229	Tampa Bay Bandits	Lionel Washington	DB	Tulane
20	230	Boston Breakers	Jimmy Thomas	DB	Indiana
20	231	Michigan Panthers	Daryl Posey	RB	Mississippi College
20	232	Denver Gold	Jim Perryman	DB	Millikin
20	233	Philadelphia Stars	Frank Bruno	RB	UCLA
20	234	Oakland Invaders	Aaron Williams	WR	Washington
20	235	Chicago Blitz	Babe Laufenberg	QB	Indiana
20	236	Birmingham Stallions	George Tillman	LB	Southern Miss
20	237	Washington Federals	Tom Carnes	OG	East Carolina
20	238	New Jersey Generals	Joe Lukens	OG	Ohio State
20	239	Arizona Wranglers	Kevin Belcher	DE	UTEP
20	240	Los Angeles Express	Mike Walter	DE	Oregon
21	241	Los Angeles Express	Darius Durham	WR	San Diego State
21	242	Arizona Wranglers	Karl Morgan	DT	UCLA
21	243	New Jersey Generals	Carlton Briscoe	DB	McNeese State
21	244	Washington Federals	Mike Forslund	QB	Liberty
21	245	Birmingham Stallions	Tony Sartor	T	Mississippi State
21	246	Chicago Blitz	Karl Mecklenburg	DE	Minnesota
21	247	Oakland Invaders	Thomas Strauthers	DT	Jackson State
21	248	Philadelphia Stars	Eric Williams	DB	NC State
21	249	Denver Gold	Byron Williams	WR	Texas-Arlington
21	250	Michigan Panthers	Ron Osborne	DB	Iowa State
21	251	Boston Breakers	Kevin Akins	DT	Ohio State
21	252	Tampa Bay Bandits	Ernie Goolsby	RB	Vanderbilt
22	253	Philadelphia Stars	Donnie Cook	DB	East Tennessee State
22	254	Boston Breakers	Tom Gilmartin	DT	Cal Poly (San Luis Obispo)
22	255	Michigan Panthers	Brian Threlkeld	G	Puget Sound
22	256	Denver Gold	Tom Sullivan	DB	UCLA
22	257	Philadelphia Stars	Dwayne Jackson	DE	South Carolina State
22	258	Oakland Invaders	Otis Brown	RB	Jackson State
22	259	Chicago Blitz	Mark Rush	RB	Miami (FL)
22	260	Birmingham Stallions	Moochie Allen	DT	Southern Miss
22	261	Washington Federals	Tracy Singleton	WR	Howard
22	262	New Jersey Generals	Earnest Barnes	DL	Mississippi State
22	263	Arizona Wranglers	Jim Bright	RB	Northern Colorado
22	264	Los Angeles Express	Bernard Quarles	QB	Hawaii
23	265	Los Angeles Express	Mike Bos	WR	Puget Sound
23	266	Arizona Wranglers	Mike Elarms	WR	Angelo State
23	267	New Jersey Generals	Steve Hammond	LB	Wake Forest
23	268	Washington Federals	John Ward	WR	Cornell (Iowa)
23	269	Birmingham Stallions	Mike Kincaid	WR	Mississippi College
23	270	Chicago Blitz	Chuck Nelson	K	Washington
23	271	Oakland Invaders	Elmer James	RB	San Francisco State
23	272	Philadelphia Stars	Carl Monroe	RB	Utah
23	273	Denver Gold	Darrin Newbold	LB	Southwest Missouri State
23	274	Michigan Panthers	Derek Holloway	WR	Arkansas
23	275	Boston Breakers	Joaquin Zendejas	K	La Verne
23	276	Tampa Bay Bandits	Carl Franks	TE	Duke
24	277	Tampa Bay Bandits	Dave Pyles	T	Miami (OH)
24	278	Boston Breakers	Carl Kennybrew	LB	Hawaii
24	279	Michigan Panthers	Gary Chachere	DT	Oklahoma State
24	280	Denver Gold	Andre Young	LB	Bowling Green
24	281	Philadelphia Stars	Earnest Butler	G	NC State
24	282	Oakland Invaders	Steve Sebahar	C	Washington State
24	283	Chicago Blitz	Dennis Talbot	LB	Rhode Island
24	284	Birmingham Stallions	Dave Worsham	QB	Arkansas Tech
24	285	Washington Federals	Roger Cattelan	T	Boston College
24	286	New Jersey Generals	Tim Dorian	C	Wichita State
24	287	Arizona Wranglers	Claybon Fields	T	Purdue
24	288	Los Angeles Express	Don Elliott	T	New Mexico
