= List of Drake Bulldogs in the NFL draft =

This is a list of Drake Bulldogs football players in the NFL draft.

== Key ==
B	Back	K	Kicker	NT	Nose tackle
C	Center	LB	Linebacker	FB	Fullback
DB	Defensive back	P	Punter	HB	Halfback
DE	Defensive end	QB	Quarterback	WR	Wide receiver
DT	Defensive tackle	RB	Running back	G	Guard
E	End	T	Offensive tackle	TE	Tight end

== Selections ==
Year	Round	Pick	Player	Team	Position
1939	2	11	Clarence Manders	Brooklyn Dodgers	B
1940	16	150	Ned Swan	New York Giants	C
1943	30	286	Clark Mollenhoff	New York Giants	T
1945	25	262	George Kita	New York Giants	B
1950	27	347	Tom Bienemann	Chicago Cardinals	E
1951	5	53	Dick Steere	San Francisco 49ers	T
1951	11	127	Tom Bienemann	Chicago Cardinals	E
1951	21	247	Dick Bunting	Chicago Cardinals	E
1952	1	5	Johnny Bright	Philadelphia Eagles	B
1952	19	224	Ken Reidenbach	Chicago Bears	T
1956	16	187	Moose Hendrik	Baltimore Colts	B
1957	10	110	Don Bruhns	Philadelphia Eagles	C
1958	15	171	Tom Newell	Green Bay Packers	B
1958	20	239	Jerry Mertens	San Francisco 49ers	E
1959	22	253	Charlie Anderson	Green Bay Packers	E
1962	19	255	Gerard Barto	Los Angeles Rams	T
1963	11	152	Karl Kassulke	Detroit Lions	DB
1964	7	97	Dick Herzing	Green Bay Packers	T
1965	14	192	John Putnam	Green Bay Packers	RB
1967	11	284	Paul Tomich	Buffalo Bills	T
1969	5	105	Ben Mayes	Buffalo Bills	DT
1969	13	315	John Lynch	Pittsburgh Steelers	LB
1969	16	402	Dick Hewins	Green Bay Packers	WR
1970	6	142	Duane Miller	New York Giants	WR
1970	12	290	Dave Simpson	Buffalo Bills	T
1972	9	224	Bill McClintock	Detroit Lions	DB
1972	9	229	Steve Boekholder	Washington Redskins	DE
1973	8	207	Doug Winslow	New Orleans Saints	WR
1973	12	298	Mike Samples	Atlanta Falcons	LB
1974	4	104	Bill Stevenson	Miami Dolphins	DT
1974	13	336	Pete Solverson	Los Angeles Rams	T
1975	2	50	Glenn Lott	Buffalo Bills	DB
1975	7	169	Mike Murphy	Detroit Lions	WR
1975	15	366	Jim O'Connor	New York Giants	RB
1979	7	175	Jack Matia	Oakland Raiders	T
1980	8	213	Derrick Goddard	Tampa Bay Buccaneers	DB
1981	12	308	Mike Moeller	New York Jets	T
1983	4	107	Pat Dunsmore	Chicago Bears	TE
2017	5	174	Eric Saubert	Atlanta Falcons	TE
