= Jim Stanley (American football) =

American football player and coach (1935–2012)

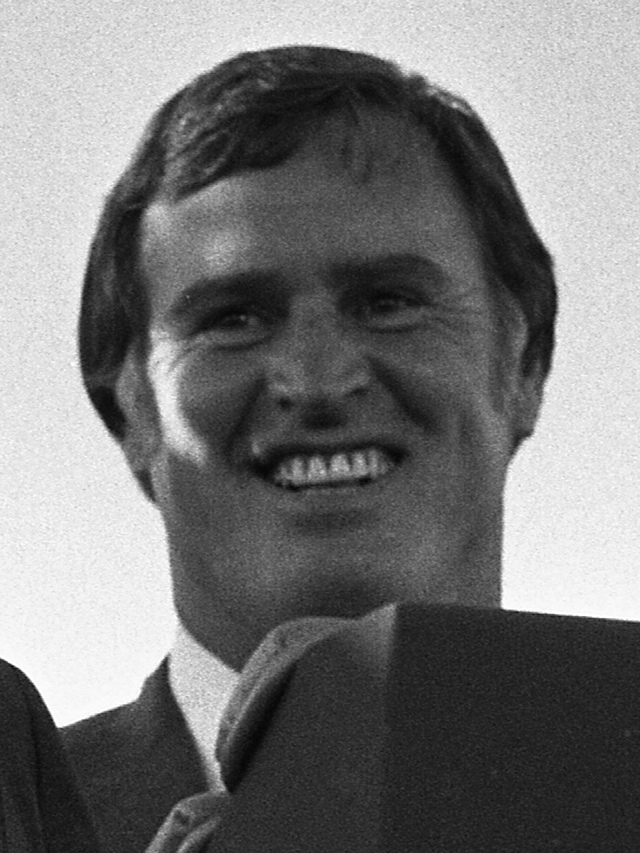
- Stanley in 1976

Biographical details
- Born: June 22, 1934; Dunham, Kentucky, U.S.
- Died: January 12, 2012 (aged 76); Chandler, Arizona, U.S.

Playing career
- 1955–1957: Texas A&M
- Positions: Guard, defensive tackle

Coaching career (HC unless noted)
- 1958–1960: Amarillo HS (TX) (line)
- 1961: SMU (assistant)
- 1962: Texas Western (assistant)
- 1963–1965: Oklahoma State (assistant)
- 1966–1968: Oklahoma State (DC)
- 1969–1970: Navy (DC)
- 1971: Winnipeg Blue Bombers (DC)
- 1972: Oklahoma State (DC)
- 1973–1978: Oklahoma State
- 1979: New York Giants (DL)
- 1980–1982: Atlanta Falcons (DL)
- 1983–1984: Michigan Panthers
- 1985: Tampa Bay Buccaneers (DL)
- 1986: Tampa Bay Buccaneers (DC)
- 1990–1994: Houston Oilers (DL)

Administrative career (AD unless noted)
- 1995–2007: Arizona Cardinals (dir. pro personnel)

Head coaching record
- Overall: 35–31–2 (college); 24–15 (USFL)
- Bowls: 2–0

Accomplishments and honors

Championships
- 1 Big Eight (1976); 1 USFL (1983)

Jim Stanley (June 22, 1934 – January 12, 2012) was an American football player and coach. He served as the head football coach at Oklahoma State University–Stillwater from 1973 to 1978, compiling a record of 35–31–2. Stanley was also the head coach of the USFL's Michigan Panthers in 1983 and 1984, their only two years of existence. The Panthers won the USFL Championship in 1983.

== Biography ==
Stanley was a three-year starter for Bear Bryant's Texas A&M Aggies teams in the 1950s. He was a member of the undefeated 1956 A&M team. He began his coaching career in Amarillo, Texas, coaching high school football from 1959 to 1960. He served as defensive coordinator at Oklahoma State from 1963 to 1968, before moving to the United States Naval Academy from 1969 to 1970, and then the Canadian Football League's Winnipeg Blue Bombers from 1971 to 1972.

Stanley returned to Stillwater to become the head coach of the Oklahoma State University Cowboys in 1973. He coached at Oklahoma State from 1973 to 1978, amassing a career record of 35–31–2. His Cowboys earned a Fiesta Bowl victory in 1974 and his 1976 team ended the season 9–3 finishing as a Big Eight co-champions on their way to a Tangerine Bowl victory. His success at Oklahoma State earned him many accolades, including being invited to coach three collegiate all-star games: the 1973 East–West Shrine Game, the 1977 Hula Bowl, and the 1977 Japan Bowl.

In 1978, the Big Eight Conference initiated an investigation into the Oklahoma State University football program in response to allegations of violations of several NCAA rules and regulations while Stanley was head coach. Stanley successfully filed suit against the conference to require them to provide various due process protections in their final hearing on the charges. A decade later, however, the United States Supreme Court, in a case involving UNLV head basketball coach Jerry Tarkanian, held that the 14th Amendment's due process guarantees were not applicable to the NCAA and similar athletic organizations since their investigations do not amount to the requisite action necessary for the constitutional protections to apply.

Stanley served as the defensive line coach for the New York Giants in 1979 and the Atlanta Falcons from 1980 to 1982 before moving to the USFL. Stanley was in the running to be the head coach of the USFL's Birmingham Stallions, but was passed over for Pittsburgh Steelers offensive line coach Rollie Dotsch.

Stanley was later signed by the Michigan Panthers to serve as their head coach, a position he held in 1983 and 1984. His 1983 team won the league championship after starting off 1–4. Following the poor start, Stanley recognized that his offensive line was too porous to allow rookie quarterback Bobby Hebert to succeed and so he lobbied management to bring in some veteran NFL offensive linemen to fill the gaps. Management addressed the issue by signing a bevy of experienced offensive linemen: Tyrone McGriff and Thom Dornbrook of the New York Giants and Ray Pinney of the Pittsburgh Steelers. Dornbrook and McGriff made USFL all-league teams in 1983 and Pinney was considered one of the best tackles in the league. The team finished the regular season 11–2 and then ran through the playoffs defeating Jim Mora's Philadelphia Stars. His 1984 squad looked like a favorite to repeat, going 6–0 to start the season, but then star wide receiver Anthony Carter was lost for the season. Combined with reports of player salary complaints, that led the team to go 4–8 for the remainder of the season. The Panthers were eliminated in the first round by Steve Young's Los Angeles Express, 27–21, in a hard-fought, triple-overtime game. It was pro football's longest game and the Panthers' last. Stanley finished with a 24–15 record in the USFL.

After the season, the majority of USFL owners, led by New Jersey Generals owner Donald Trump and Chicago franchise owner Eddie Einhorn voted to move the league to a fall schedule. Panthers' owner A. Alfred Taubman had no desire to compete head to head with his friend, Detroit Lions owner William Clay Ford. Following the vote, the Panthers delegation surprised the league owners and commissioner by announcing the team would be merged with the Oakland Invaders in a pre-negotiated conditional deal. The new team went with a new head coach, Charlie Sumner.

Stanley returned to the NFL. He joined the Tampa Bay Buccaneers as defensive line coach before moving up to defensive coordinator in 1986. He was a defensive coach for the Houston Oilers for six years before joining the Arizona Cardinals' player personnel department. He retired as the Director of Player Personnel for the Cardinals after serving in that role for 12 years. Stanley was involved in the acquisition of quarterback Kurt Warner by the Cardinals. Warner's play was key in leading the Cardinals to their first NFL Championship game in decades.

Stanley also served as an assistant coach at Southern Methodist University (SMU) and the University of Texas at El Paso (UTEP).

Stanley and his wife, Sylvia, have four children. Stanley suffered from melanoma and died on January 12, 2012, in Chandler, Arizona.

== Head coaching record ==
=== College ===
| Year | Team | Overall | Conference | Standing | Bowl/playoffs | Coaches^{#} | AP^{°} |
|---|---|---|---|---|---|---|---|
Oklahoma State Cowboys (Big Eight Conference) (1973–1978)
| 1973 | Oklahoma State | 5–4–2 | 2–3–2 | 5th | | | |
| 1974 | Oklahoma State | 7–5 | 4–3 | 4th | W Fiesta | | |
| 1975 | Oklahoma State | 7–4 | 3–4 | T–5th | | | |
| 1976 | Oklahoma State | 9–3 | 5–2 | T–1st | W Tangerine | 14 | 14 |
| 1977 | Oklahoma State | 4–7 | 2–5 | 7th | | | |
| 1978 | Oklahoma State | 3–8 | 3–4 | T–5th | | | |
| Oklahoma State: | | 35–31–2 | 19–21–2 | | | | |
| Total: | | 35–31–2 | | | | | |
National championship Conference title Conference division title or championship game berth
^{#}Rankings from final Coaches Poll.; ^{°}Rankings from final AP Poll.

=== USFL ===
| Team | Year | Regular season | | | | | Postseason | | | |
| Team | Year | Won | Lost | Ties | Win % | Finish | Won | Lost | Win % | Result |
|---|---|---|---|---|---|---|---|---|---|---|
| MICH | 1983 | 12 | 6 | 0 | .667 | 1st Central Div. | 2 | 0 | 1.000 | Won Divisional (Oakland); Won USFL Championship (Philadelphia) |
| MICH | 1984 | 10 | 8 | 0 | .556 | 2nd WC Central | 0 | 1 | .000 | Lost Quarterfinal (Los Angeles) |
| Total | | 22 | 14 | 0 | .611 | | 2 | 1 | .667 | |
