= John Williams (running back) =

American gridiron football player (born 1960)

No. 38, 40, 45
- Position: Running back

Personal information
- Born: October 26, 1960 (age 66); Muskegon, Michigan, U.S.
- Listed height: 5 ft 11 in (1.80 m)
- Listed weight: 213 lb (97 kg)

Career information
- High school: Muskegon (MI) Reeths-Puffer
- College: Wisconsin
- NFL draft: 1985: undrafted

Career history
- Michigan Panthers (1983–1984); Oakland Invaders (1985); Dallas Cowboys (1985); Seattle Seahawks (1985); New Orleans Saints (1986); Indianapolis Colts (1987); Calgary Stampeders (1988)

Awards and highlights
- PFWA All-Rookie Team (1986)

Career NFL statistics
- Games played: 19
- Rushing attempts: 14
- Rushing yards: 42
- Receptions: 1
- Receiving yards: 5
- Stats at Pro Football Reference

John Alan Williams (born October 26, 1960) is an American former professional football player who was a running back in the National Football League (NFL) for the Dallas Cowboys, Seattle Seahawks, New Orleans Saints and Indianapolis Colts. He also was a member of the Michigan Panthers and Oakland Invaders in the United States Football League (USFL). He played college football at the University of Wisconsin.

== Early life ==
Williams attended Reeths Puffer High School, where he practiced football and track. He accepted a football scholarship from the University of Wisconsin. As a freshman, he scored on a 40-yard touchdown run with his first collegiate carry. He had 6 carries for 56 yards and one touchdown as a backup.

As a sophomore, he led the team with 119 carries for 526 yards (4.4-yard avg.). As a junior, he led the team with 116 carries for 634 yards (5.5-yard avg.) and 3 rushing touchdowns (second on the team).

As a senior, he registered 77 carries for 287 yards (third on the team) and 4 touchdowns. He finished his college career with 318 carries for 1,503 yards (4.7-yard avg.), 8 rushing touchdowns, 13 receptions for 103 yards and one receiving touchdown.

== Professional career ==
=== Michigan Panthers/Oakland Invaders ===
Williams was selected by the Michigan Panthers in the 14th round (159th overall) of the 1983 USFL draft. He helped the team capture the USFL's first championship. He suffered a toe injury and did not play in the 24–22 title win over the Atlantic Division champion Philadelphia Stars. He was second on the team behind Ken Lacy with 153 carries for 624 yards (4.1-yard avg.), while registering 13 touchdowns (led the team) and a 24.2 kickoff average on 12 returns (led the team).

In 1984, he led the team with 197 carries for 984 yards (5-yard avg.) and 8 rushing touchdowns, while also posting 1,199 total yards from scrimmage (led the team) and 25 receptions for 215 yards. He set a franchise record with a 72-yard touchdown run. He tallied 177 rushing yards in the first-round 21-27 playoff loss against the Los Angeles Express, which at the time was the longest game in professional football history.

In 1985, he moved to Oakland when the franchise merged with the Invaders. He was second on the team behind Albert Bentley with 186 carries for 857 yards (4.6-yard avg.) and 9 rushing touchdowns (led the team). He helped the team reach the USFL championship game where it suffered a 24–28 loss against the Baltimore Stars.

Williams finished his three-year USFL career as the franchise's all-time leading rusher with 2,645 yards and as the sixth leading All-time rusher in league history.

=== Dallas Cowboys ===
On August 15, 1985, he signed as a free agent with the Dallas Cowboys after the Oakland Invaders folded. He made the team over fullback Ron Springs. He played in 8 games as a backup to fullback Timmy Newsome. He had 13 carries for 40 yards and averaged 21.5 yards on 6 kickoff returns. He was released on October 29, to make room for fullback Todd Fowler.

=== Seattle Seahawks ===
On November 6, 1985, he was signed as a free agent by the Seattle Seahawks. He played in 2 games before being placed on the injured reserve list. He was released before the start of the season on August 28, 1986.

=== New Orleans Saints ===
On September 2, 1986, he signed as a free agent with the New Orleans Saints. He was limited with a sprained knee injury that he suffered in his first carry as a Saint. He only appeared in 7 games and spent the last 5 contests of the season on the injured reserve list. He was released on September 7, 1987.

=== Indianapolis Colts ===
On September 8, 1987, he was claimed off waivers by the Indianapolis Colts to replace an injured Owen Gill. He was released on September 27, one game after the NFL strike was canceled.

=== Calgary Stampeders ===
In 1988, he signed with the Calgary Stampeders of the Canadian Football League, reuniting with head coach Lary Kuharich, who was his offensive coordinator with the Oakland Invaders. He was placed on the injured reserve list, before being activated for the sixth game against the Calgary Stampeders. He was released from the active roster and signed to the practice roster on October 21. He was released from the practice roster on November 6. He finished with 44 carries for 130 yards.
