= David Tipton =

David Tipton may refer to:

- David Tipton (defensive tackle) (born 1953), defensive tackle for the New England Patriots of the National Football League
- Dave Tipton (born 1949), defensive end for several NFL teams from 1971 to 1976
