= Robert Pennywell =

American football player (1954–2022)

No. 59
- Position: Linebacker

Personal information
- Born: November 6, 1954; Shreveport, Louisiana, U.S.
- Died: October 7, 2022 (aged 67)
- Listed height: 6 ft 1 in (1.85 m)
- Listed weight: 222 lb (101 kg)

Career information
- High school: Woodlawn (Shreveport, LA); Shreveport (LA) Capt. Shreve
- College: Grambling State
- NFL draft: 1976: 6th round, 168th overall pick

Career history
- Atlanta Falcons (1977–1980); Michigan Panthers (1983–1984)

Career NFL statistics
- Games played - started: 61-42
- Interceptions - TDs: 3-2
- Fumble recoveries: 6
- Stats at Pro Football Reference

Robert Pennywell (November 6, 1954 – October 7, 2022) was an American professional football player who played linebacker for four seasons for the Atlanta Falcons in the National Football League (NFL), and two seasons for the Michigan Panthers of the United States Football League (USFL).

His cousin Carlos Pennywell also played for the NFL.

Pennywell died on October 7, 2022, at the age of 67.
