= Arena Football League Kicker of the Year =

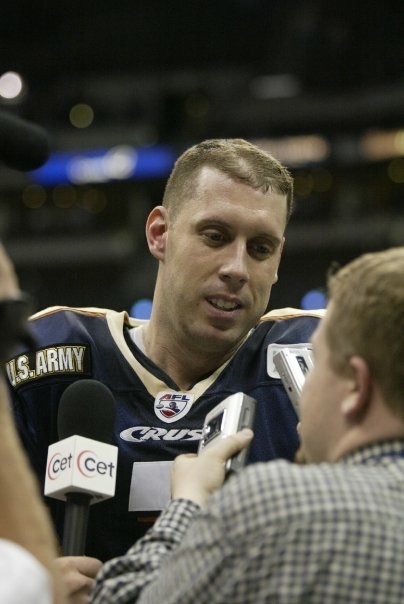
Clay Rush was a two-time AFL Kicker of the Year

The Arena Football League Kicker of the Year (AFL Kicker of the Year) was an annual award given to the Arena Football League's best placekicker each season. Six players won the award twice.

Season	Player	Team
1990	Novo Bojovic	Detroit Drive
1991	Rusty Fricke	Denver Dynamite
1996	Pete Elezovic	Albany Firebirds
1997	Steve Videtich	New Jersey Red Dogs
1998	Kenny Stucker	Milwaukee Mustangs
1999	Mike Black	New England Sea Wolves
2000	Clay Rush	Iowa Barnstormers
2001	Brian Gowins	Grand Rapids Rampage
2002	Steve Videtich (2)	New Jersey Gladiators
2003	Clay Rush (2)	Indiana Firebirds
2004	Jay Taylor	Orlando Predators
2005	Remy Hamilton	Los Angeles Avengers
2006	Remy Hamilton (2)	Los Angeles Avengers
2007	Mark Lewis	Austin Wranglers
2008	A. J. Haglund	San Jose SaberCats
2010	Chris Gould	Chicago Rush
2011	Carlos Martínez	Georgia Force
2012	Kenny Spencer	Spokane Shock
2013	Garrett Lindholm	Arizona Rattlers
2014	Nich Pertuit	San Jose SaberCats
2015	Tommy Frevert	Philadelphia Soul
2016	Tommy Frevert (2)	Philadelphia Soul
2017	Adrian Trevino	Philadelphia Soul
2018	Mark Lewis (2)	Baltimore Brigade
2019	Adrian Trevino (2)	Albany Empire
