= Clarence Chapman =

American football player (born 1953)

No. 24, 42
- Position: Cornerback

Personal information
- Born: December 10, 1953 (age 72); Detroit, Michigan, U.S.
- Listed height: 5 ft 10 in (1.78 m)
- Listed weight: 185 lb (84 kg)

Career information
- High school: Redford (MI)
- College: Eastern Michigan
- NFL draft: 1976: 7th round, 204th overall pick

Career history
- Oakland Raiders (1976)*; New Orleans Saints (1976–1980); Cincinnati Bengals (1980–1981); Michigan Panthers (1983–1984); Detroit Lions (1985)
- * Offseason or practice squad member only

Career NFL statistics
- Interceptions: 5
- INT yards: 24
- Touchdowns: 1
- Stats at Pro Football Reference

Clarence Earl Chapman (born December 10, 1953) is an American former professional football player who was a cornerback in the National Football League (NFL). He was selected 204th overall by the Oakland Raiders in the seventh round of the 1976 NFL draft. He played college football for the Eastern Michigan Eagles.

Chapman also played for the New Orleans Saints, Cincinnati Bengals and Detroit Lions.
