= Kyle Borland =

American football player (born 1961)

No. 91
- Position: Linebacker

Personal information
- Born: July 5, 1961 (age 65); Denison, Iowa
- Listed height: 6 ft 3 in (1.91 m)
- Listed weight: 232 lb (105 kg)

Career information
- High school: Fort Atkinson (WI)
- College: Wisconsin
- NFL draft: 1983: undrafted

Career history
- Michigan Panthers (1983-1984); New Jersey Generals (1985); Los Angeles Rams (1987)
- Stats at Pro Football Reference

Kyle Borland (born July 5, 1961) is a former linebacker for the Los Angeles Rams who played during the 1987 NFL season. He played in two games and recorded two sacks. He played college football for the Wisconsin Badgers.
