= Ron Hopkins =

American football player (born 1960)

No. 46, 15
- Positions: Defensive back, return specialist

Personal information
- Born: November 10, 1960 (age 65); Ridgely, Tennessee, U.S.
- Listed height: 5 ft 10 in (1.78 m)
- Listed weight: 180 lb (82 kg)

Career information
- College: Murray State
- NFL draft: 1983: 10th round, 252nd overall pick

Career history
- 1983–1991: Calgary Stampeders

Ronald Lee Hopkins (born November 10, 1960) is an American former professional football defensive back who played nine seasons with the Calgary Stampeders of the Canadian Football League (CFL). He played college football at Murray State University.

== Early life and college ==
Ronald Lee Hopkins was born on November 10, 1960, in Ridgely, Tennessee.

Hopkins played for the Murray State Racers from 1979 to 1982. He earned All-OVC honors his senior season in 1982. He was inducted into the Murray State Athletics Hall of Fame in 2014.

== Professional career ==
Hopkins was selected by the Baltimore Colts in the tenth round, with the 252nd overall pick, of the 1983 NFL draft and by the Michigan Panthers in the eighth round, with the 87th overall pick, of the 1983 USFL draft.

However, Hopkins had already signed a two-year contract with the Calgary Stampeders of the Canadian Football League (CFL) two days prior to the NFL draft. He played in 132 games for the Stampeders from 1983 to 1991. He intercepted 27 passes for 423 yards during his CFL career. Hopkins also returned 226 kickoffs for 5,238 yards and two touchdowns and 73 punts for 693 yards.
