= Chicago Fire (WFL) =

Former American football team

General information
- Founded: October 1973
- Folded: January 1975
- Stadium: Soldier Field
- Headquartered: Chicago, Illinois
- Colors: Red and black

Personnel
- Owner: Thomas Origer
- Head coach: Jim Spavital

League / conference affiliations
- World Football League; Central Division

The Chicago Fire was an American football team in the short-lived World Football League for one season, 1974.

== Formation ==
The team was founded in late October 1973, with building magnate Thomas Origer becoming the first owner to purchase a WFL franchise, for around $400,000.

Chicago was also the first franchise to sign a player, former Notre Dame and Chicago Bears wide receiver Jim Seymour, and then added quarterback Virgil Carter, who also had played for the NFL's Bears as well as the Cincinnati Bengals and San Diego Chargers. Another notable Fire player was punter Chuck Ramsey, who would later go on to play with the New York Jets. Jim Spavital, one-time coach of the Canadian Football League's Winnipeg Blue Bombers, piloted the Fire. The radio announcer for the Fire was former Milwaukee Bucks play-by-play man Eddie Doucette, while ex-Chicago Bears lineman Mike Pyle served as the color commentator. Home games were played at Soldier Field in the Loop area.

== 1974 season ==
Fittingly, the Fire started out hot, winning their first four games and seven of their first nine. Chicago also drew decent-sized crowds to Soldier Field, with an average attendance of 33,858 at their first five home contests. After Virgil Carter threw four touchdown passes in a 32-22 road win over Southern California, the Fire were 7-2 and competitive in the WFL's Central Division, which contained the loop's two strongest teams in Birmingham (9-0) and Memphis (also 7-2). However, it turned out to be the last game the Fire would ever win, as a rash of injuries triggered a 10-game losing streak. Crowds also began to dwindle, as barely 20,000 showed up to watch the Fire's last home game, a 60-17 rout by the Hawaiians, the most points ever scored by one team in a WFL game.

By late October, Fire owner Origer had had enough. Fed up by the team's collapse (as well as bankrupt), Origer said at an emergency meeting in Chicago on October 29 that his club would pull out of the WFL (with three games left in the schedule) if league commissioner Gary Davidson was not fired. Davidson quit, but two weeks later Origer still refused to fly the team to Philadelphia for Chicago's final game, forfeiting the contest and giving the Fire a final record of 7-13. Soon after, the club disbanded.

== Legacy ==
In 1975, the WFL tried again in the Windy City with the Chicago Winds, who attempted to sign legendary quarterback Joe Namath. But Namath stayed in the NFL, and the Winds were disbanded after just five games (including one game at Soldier Field that drew a crowd of 3,470). The World Football League followed suit a few months later, passing into history.

In 1981, another Chicago Fire club played in the minor-league American Football Association. Led by running back Billy Marek, the new Fire also played at Soldier Field, albeit in front of small crowds: the biggest attendance of the year was estimated at 8,500. Chicago did have a successful season on the field, winning the AFA's Western Division with a 8-4 record. In the playoffs, Chicago knocked off Jacksonville, 24-17, in front of 5,000 at Soldier Field, then played in the league championship game, a 29-21 road loss to the West Virginia Rockets on August 30, 1981. They even managed to get one of their games on local television: WGN-TV, scrambling for summer sports programming during the baseball strike, broadcast a Fire game from Soldier Field on June 27, 1981. (Although ratings were higher than that of the Chicago Sting soccer team on WGN, station officials declined to carry any more Fire games.) Financial losses, and the formation of the bigger-budget USFL in 1982, put the Fire out for good.

Chicago's current professional soccer team, founded in 1997, also is named the Fire.

== Schedule and results ==
Key:	Win	Loss	Bye

=== 1974 regular season ===
Week	Day	Date	Opponent	Result	Attendance
1	Wednesday	July 10, 1974	Houston Texans	W 17–0	42,000
2	Wednesday	July 17, 1974	Jacksonville Sharks	W 25–22	29,308
3	Wednesday	July 24, 1974	at Portland Storm	W 29–22	19,358
4	Sunday	July 28, 1974	at Hawaiians	W 53–29	12,608
5	Wednesday	August 7, 1974	Florida Blazers	L 21–46	31,193
6	Wednesday	August 14, 1974	Philadelphia Bell	W 32–29	27,607
7	Thursday	August 22, 1974	at Detroit Wheels	W 35–23	10,300
8	Thursday	August 29, 1974	Birmingham Americans	L 8–22	44,732
9	Monday	September 2, 1974	at Southern California Sun	W 32–22	27,133
10	Saturday	September 7, 1974	at Birmingham Americans	L 40–41	54,872
11	Wednesday	September 11, 1974	Southern California Sun	L 28–31	24,837
12	Wednesday	September 18, 1974	Memphis Southmen	L 7–25	26,678
13	Thursday	September 26, 1974	at Florida Blazers	L 0–26	16,679
14	Thursday	October 3, 1974	Charlotte Stars	L 30–41	22,354
15	Wednesday	October 9, 1974	Florida Blazers	L 17–45	23,289
16	Wednesday	October 16, 1974	at Charlotte Hornets	L 0–27	20,333
17	Wednesday	October 23, 1974	Hawaiians	L 17–60	20,203
18	Wednesday	October 30, 1974	at Philadelphia Bell	L 31–37	12,500
19	Thursday	November 7, 1974	at Memphis Southmen	L 24–49	14,085
20	Wednesday	November 13, 1974	at Philadelphia Bell	L 0–2 (forfeit)	cancelled

== See also ==
- Chicago Winds
- 1974 World Football League season
