= Donnie Echols =

American football player (born 1957)

No. 83
- Position: Tight end

Personal information
- Born: December 16, 1957 (age 68); Dallas, Texas, U.S.
- Listed height: 6 ft 3 in (1.91 m)
- Listed weight: 240 lb (109 kg)

Career information
- High school: Franklin D. Roosevelt (Dallas)
- College: Oklahoma State (1976–1979)
- NFL draft: 1980: undrafted

Career history
- Houston Oilers (1980)*; New Orleans Saints (1981)*; Michigan Panthers (1983–1984); Orlando Renegades (1985); Cleveland Browns (1987)
- * Offseason or practice squad member only

Career NFL statistics
- Games played: 3
- Stats at Pro Football Reference

Donald Wayne Echols (born December 16, 1957) is an American former professional football player who was a tight end for the Cleveland Browns of the National Football League (NFL). He played college football for the Oklahoma State Cowboys.
