= Mike Edwards (linebacker) =

American football player (born 1957)

Michael Edwards
No. 53
- Position: Linebacker

Personal information
- Born: February 15, 1957 (age 69); Plant City, Florida
- Listed height: 6 ft 4 in (1.93 m)
- Listed weight: 225 lb (102 kg)

Career information
- College: Oklahoma State

Career history
- Michigan Panthers (1983–1984); Jacksonville Bulls (1985)

Mike Edwards (born February 15, 1957) is an American former football player. He was acquired by the Jacksonville Bulls prior to 1985 season. He played with Michigan Panthers the previous 2 years, recording 25 tackles in 1983 and 28 stops in 1984. Edwards was a 4-year letterman at Oklahoma State. He saw action in the Tangerine Bowl and Hula Bowl games.
