= Ira Albright =

American gridiron football player (1959–2020)

Profile
- Positions: Running back, Defensive tackle, Fullback

Personal information
- Born: January 2, 1959; Dallas, Texas
- Died: July 2, 2020 (aged 61); Dallas, Texas
- Listed height: 5 ft 11 in (1.80 m)
- Listed weight: 260 lb (118 kg)

Career information
- High school: South Oak Cliff
- College: Northeastern State
- NFL draft: 1981: undrafted

Career history
- Michigan Panthers (1983); Pittsburgh Maulers (1984); Montreal Alouettes (1986); Buffalo Bills (1985–1987)
- Stats at Pro Football Reference

Ira Albright (January 2, 1959 – July 2, 2020) was a gridiron football running back and defensive tackle. After attending South Oak Cliff High School, Albright played college football at Tyler Junior College and for the Northeastern State Riverhawks. In 1983, he played for the Michigan Panthers of the United States Football League (USFL) as a nose guard. The Pittsburgh Maulers converted Albright to a fullback in 1984, thinking he was too small to be effective on the defense. In 1986, Albright played in one regular season game with the Montreal Alouettes.
