= Mike Hagen =

American football player (1959–2015)

No. 39, 34
- Position: Running back

Personal information
- Born: June 30, 1959; Auburn, Washington, U.S.
- Died: October 11, 2015 (aged 56)
- Listed height: 6 ft 0 in (1.83 m)
- Listed weight: 240 lb (109 kg)

Career information
- High school: Auburn (Auburn, Washington)
- College: Montana
- NFL draft: 1982: undrafted

Career history
- Seattle Seahawks (1982)*; Michigan Panthers (1983); San Antonio Gunslingers (1984–1985); New York Jets (1986)*; Seattle Seahawks (1987)
- * Offseason or practice squad member only

Career NFL statistics
- Rushing yards: 3
- Rushing average: 1.5
- Stats at Pro Football Reference

Michael Christopher Hagan (June 30, 1959 – October 11, 2015) was an American professional football running back who played for the Seattle Seahawks of the National Football League (NFL). He played college football at the University of Montana. He was also a member of the Michigan Panthers, San Antonio Gunslingers and New York Jets.
