= Thomas Hopkins (American football) =

American football player (born 1960)

No. 78
- Position: Offensive tackle

Personal information
- Born: January 13, 1960 (age 66); Butler, Alabama, U.S.
- Listed height: 6 ft 6 in (1.98 m)
- Listed weight: 260 lb (118 kg)

Career information
- High school: Choctaw County
- College: Alabama A&M
- NFL draft: 1983: 10th round, 262nd overall pick

Career history
- Cleveland Browns (1983); Dallas Cowboys (1985)*
- * Offseason or practice squad member only

Career NFL statistics
- Games played: 2
- Games started: 0
- Stats at Pro Football Reference

Thomas A. Hopkins (born January 13, 1960) is an American former professional football player who was an offensive tackle in the National Football League (NFL) for one season. He played college football for the Alabama A&M Bulldogs.

== Professional career ==
Hopkins was selected by the Boston Breakers in the 17th round of the 1983 USFL draft, but did not play for the team.

Hopkins was later selected by the Cleveland Browns in the tenth round of the 1983 NFL draft. Hopkins played two games for the Browns in the 1983 season.
