= Rick Partridge =

American football player (born 1957)

No. 17, 5
- Position: Punter

Personal information
- Born: August 26, 1957 (age 69); Orange, California, U.S.
- Listed height: 6 ft 1 in (1.85 m)
- Listed weight: 175 lb (79 kg)

Career information
- High school: Tustin (Tustin, California)
- College: Utah
- NFL draft: 1979: 8th round, 208th overall pick

Career history
- Green Bay Packers (1979)*; New Orleans Saints (1979); San Diego Chargers (1980); Michigan Panthers (1983); Memphis Showboats (1984); New Jersey Generals (1985); Buffalo Bills (1987)
- * Offseason or practice squad member only

Career NFL statistics
- Punts: 135
- Punt yards: 5,355
- Longest punt: 61
- Stats at Pro Football Reference

Rick Partridge (born August 26, 1957) is an American former professional football player who was a punter in the National Football League (NFL). He first played college football at Golden West College before transferring to play for the Utah Utes. He was selected by the Green Bay Packers in the eighth round of the 1979 NFL draft. Partridge was released by the Packers on August 23, 1979. He later played in the NFL for the New Orleans Saints in 1979, the San Diego Chargers in 1980, and the Buffalo Bills in 1987. He also played in the United States Football League from 1983 to 1985.
