= Will Cokeley =

American football player (born 1960)

No. 84
- Position: Linebacker

Personal information
- Born: December 6, 1960 (age 65); Topeka, Kansas, U.S.

Career information
- High school: Washburn Rural (Topeka)
- College: Kansas State
- NFL draft: 1983: undrafted

Career history
- Michigan Panthers (1983-1985); Montreal Alouettes (1986); Buffalo Bills (1987)

Career NFL statistics
- Games played: 3
- Interceptions: 1
- Stats at Pro Football Reference

Will Harlin Cokeley (born December 6, 1960) is an American former professional football player who was a linebacker who played for the Buffalo Bills of the National Football League (NFL) in 1987. He played college football for the Kansas State Wildcats. He also played professionally for the Michigan Panthers of the United States Football League (USFL) and Montreal Alouettes of the Canadian Football League (CFL).
