= Wayne Radloff =

English gridiron football player (born 1961)

Profile
- Position: Offensive lineman

Personal information
- Born: May 17, 1961 (age 65); London, England

Career information
- High school: Winter Park (Winter Park, Florida, U.S.)
- College: Georgia

Career history
- Michigan Panthers (1983–1984); Atlanta Falcons (1985–1989); San Francisco 49ers (1990)

Awards and highlights
- National champion (1980); Second-team All-American (1982); First-team All-SEC (1982)

Career NFL statistics
- Games played: 65
- Games started: 42
- Fumble recoveries: 2
- Stats at Pro Football Reference

Wayne Richard Radloff (born May 17, 1961) is a former professional American football offensive lineman who played five seasons for the Atlanta Falcons (1985–1989) in the National Football League (NFL).

He attended Winter Park High School, graduating in 1979.
