= Karl Kassulke =

American football player (1941–2008)

No. 29
- Position: Safety

Personal information
- Born: March 20, 1941; Milwaukee, Wisconsin, U.S.
- Died: October 27, 2008 (aged 67); Eagan, Minnesota, U.S.
- Listed height: 6 ft 0 in (1.83 m)
- Listed weight: 195 lb (88 kg)

Career information
- High school: West Milwaukee (West Milwaukee, Wisconsin)
- College: Marquette (1959–1960); Drake (1961–1962)
- NFL draft: 1963: 11th round, 152nd overall pick

Career history
- Minnesota Vikings (1963–1972)

Awards and highlights
- NFL champion (1969); Pro Bowl (1970); Minnesota Vikings 25th Anniversary Team

Career NFL statistics
- Interceptions: 19
- Interception yards: 187
- Fumble recoveries: 9
- Sacks: 8.5
- Stats at Pro Football Reference

Karl Otto Kassulke (March 20, 1941 – October 27, 2008) was an American professional football safety who played his entire ten-year career with the Minnesota Vikings of the National Football League (NFL). He played college football for the Marquette Warriors and the Drake Bulldogs.

Kassulke started in Super Bowl IV, where he and teammate Earsell Mackbee missed a tackle on Kansas City Chiefs wide receiver Otis Taylor on the final touchdown of the game, late in the third quarter. The next season, he was selected to the Pro Bowl.

On July 24, 1973, Kassulke suffered a motorcycle accident on the way to training camp that left him paralyzed from the waist down.

== Early life ==
Kassulke was born on March 20, 1941, in Milwaukee, Wisconsin. He attended West Milwaukee High School. He lettered in baseball, swimming, football and track during high school, and captained the football and swimming teams.

== College ==
Kassulke originally attended Marquette University, the only school to offer him a football scholarship. He played halfback on its football team. As a sophomore in 1960, he had seven receptions for Marquette for 151 yards (21.6 yards per reception) and two touchdowns; along with 17 rushing yards on five carries. Kassulke suffered a broken bone in his right hand during the 1960 season in a game against the Wisconsin Badgers. Although he finished the game against Wisconsin (catching four passes for 72 yards), he later missed some playing time. When Kassulke returned to play two weeks later, he caught a 55-yard touchdown pass, but Marquette lost the game to Indiana University, its 41st consecutive loss to a Big Ten school.

Marquette dropped football from its athletic program in February 1961, and Kassulke was recruited by Drake University head football coach Bus Mertes to attend Drake in Des Moines, Iowa. Kassulke transferred to Drake, and earned a history degree in 1963. During his time at Drake, he served as a student teacher at Woodrow Wilson Junior High School in Des Moines.

Kassulke was a two-way player for Drake's football team, though he missed five games in his junior year with a broken collarbone. Mertes was amazed Kassulke was able to return toward the end of the 1961 season, in light of the injury’s severity. On offense, he continued to play halfback as he had at Marquette. Mertes considered the 6 ft (1.83 m), 185-pound (83.9 kg) Kassulke "'the best back I've ever coached'". He led the 1962 team in both rushing (438 yards on 94 carries) and receiving (21 catches for 309 yards).

Kassulke was also considered an excellent defensive player for Drake, leading the 1962 team in interceptions. In 1962, Kassulke had ten touchdowns, eight on offense and two on interception returns. He also returned punts and kickoffs. Drake's record was 5–4 in 1961, and 8–2 in 1962, tied for the best in school history. His 1962 Drake teammates voted Kassulke the team's most valuable player.

Kassulke was selected to play in the Blue-Gray game.

== Professional career ==
Kassulke was selected by the Detroit Lions in the eleventh round of the 1963 NFL draft (152nd overall). The Lions waived Kassulke in August 1963, before the season started. The Minnesota Vikings signed Kassulke, and he would play his entire 10-year NFL career (1963–72) with the Vikings, wearing the No. 29 jersey.

The Vikings used Kassulke as a reserve cornerback and on special teams in 1963. While he was recognized as one of the league’s hardest hitters, he did not have the speed to cover wide receivers. In 1964, the Vikings moved him to starter at strong safety, where his hard hitting and quickness were a better fit in covering tight ends. From 1964 to 1972 he started 105 games at strong safety, out of the 117 games in which he played for the Vikings over that time.

In a September 1, 1968 game against the St. Louis Cardinals, he intercepted a Charley Johnson pass and returned it 44 yards for a touchdown. In 1969, Kassulke started all 13 games in which he played, with two interceptions and one sack. The Vikings won the January 4, 1970 NFL Championship Game, 27–7 over the Cleveland Browns. Kassulke was starting strong safety in that championship game. However, the Vikings lost to the Kansas City Chiefs in Super Bowl IV, 23–7, which Kassulke also started. During a key play in the game, Vikings' cornerback Earsell Mackbee and Kassulke failed to tackle Chiefs' receiver Otis Taylor, who scored on a 46-yard touchdown pass.

Kassulke was selected to the Pro Bowl in 1970. He had three interceptions and two sacks in 1970. He also blocked two punts. He missed a portion of the 1971 season with knee injuries, playing in 12 games and starting only eight. He missed games the following season as well, when he suffered a broken leg in a game against the Denver Broncos; playing in only eight games, and starting only six in 1972.

The games he played in 1972 were his last in the NFL. On July 24, 1973, Kassulke was in a motorcycle accident on the way to training camp that left him with a blood clot in the brain that had him in and out of a coma for a month, and a fractured vertebra that left him paralyzed from the waist down for the remainder of his life.

== Legacy ==
Kassulke was immortalized in NFL lore by NFL Films' official highlight film for Super Bowl IV. Kansas City Chiefs coach Hank Stram, who was wired for sound by NFL Films executive producer Ed Sabol, noted the confusion in the Vikings' defense due to the Chiefs' shifting offense and quipped, "Kassulke was running around there like it was a Chinese fire drill". Kassulke himself said after the game, "'I think the main thing, due to their different sets, was our moment of hesitation. We were not a hell-bent team like we normally were'". In this last game before the merger of the American Football League and National Football League, Kassulke graciously added "'Personnel wise they are as fine a team as we faced all year. They are as fine a team as any in the NFL'".

Vikings Hall of Fame head coach Bud Grant said of Kassulke after the spinal injury ended his career, "'You admired him for his durability and toughness. You miss him not only as a player but as a friend'". Vikings Hall of Fame general manager Jim Finks observed that even more than his play, Kassulke's "'main contribution to his team came during practices and in the dressing room. Practices would drag and he was the guy who would always come up with the right remark. That was his great contribution.'"

He was honored as a member of the Vikings' 25th Anniversary All-Time Team at defensive back.

== Personal life ==
After his paralyzing injury, Kassulke spent two months in the hospital and then underwent therapy at the Childrens Rehabilitation Center near the University of Minnesota. Minneapolis night club owner and philanthropist Joe Duffy led a group in establishing a fundraising drive for Kassulke, raising nearly $200,000 in funds needed to supplement his NFL benefits in paying medical expenses which had exceeded $40,000 in just three months. This effort culminated with Karl Kassulke Day, held on November 25, 1973, during halftime of the Vikings final home game of the 1973 season at Metropolitan Stadium in Bloomington, Minnesota. This was Kassulke's first public appearance since the July 1973 motorcycle accident. Each Vikings player shook Kassulke's hand, and he was given a standing ovation by the Minnesota fans. Governor Wendell Anderson issued a proclamation honoring Kassulke.

Kassulke met his second wife, Sue, during his treatment and rehabilitation, when she was his primary nurse. They had one child together. He went on to work with Wings Outreach, a Christian Ministry to the disabled, and was a member of such religious organizations as the Fellowship of Christian Athletes. He became an executive board member with the March of Dimes, an active spokesman for the United Way and was involved with United Handicapped Federation. He also worked as a goodwill ambassador for Blue Cross/Blue Shield. He was a public speaker and sat for hundreds of interviews. He authored a book about his life entitled Kassulke, with Ron Pitkin. He also wrote a weekly football column on the Vikings.

Kassulke's competitiveness helped him realize he could still live a good life, even though he would have to use a wheelchair for the rest of his life. He believed, and sought to communicate the point, that there should be no real difference in how a person is perceived simply because they have to use a wheelchair instead of being able to walk.

In 2011, his first wife, Jan Thatcher Adams, MD, with whom he had two sons, authored the book, Football Wife: Coming of Age with the NFL as Mrs. Karl Kassulke, including among other things discussions of the difficulties in their life together before their 1973 divorce. The divorce occurred before his July 1973 accident. Kassulke said after the divorce that he was surprised, and started living a more reckless and unstable lifestyle, including riding motorcycles; though it was a friend driving the motorcycle on which he was a passenger when he suffered his injuries.

== Death ==
He died of a heart attack at his home in Eagan, Minnesota on October 27, 2008.
