= Jimmy Hargrove =

American football player (born 1957)

No. 36, 20
- Position: running back

Personal information
- Born: November 13, 1957; Sampson County, North Carolina
- Died: October 8, 2021 (aged 63)
- Listed height: 6 ft 2 in (1.88 m)
- Listed weight: 228 lb (103 kg)

Career information
- High school: Smithfield-Selma
- College: Wake Forest
- NFL draft: 1981: undrafted

Career history
- Cincinnati Bengals (1981); Green Bay Packers (1987)
- Stats at Pro Football Reference

Jimmy Hargrove was a former running back in the National Football League.

== Biography ==
Hargrove was born on November 13, 1957, in Sampson County, North Carolina. He died on October 8, 2021.

== Career ==
Hargrove played with the Cincinnati Bengals during the 1981 NFL season. He also played with the USFL eventual champion Michigan Panthers and Los Angeles Raiders football teams, Hargrove also played with the Green Bay Packers during the 1987 NFL season.

He played at the collegiate level at Wake Forest University. He scored the go-ahead touchdown in the fourth quarter of an eventual 12-10 loss at Virginia on October 22, 1977.
