= United Handicapped Federation =

American non-profit organization

The United Handicapped Federation (UHF) was a non-profit group involved in the support and advocacy of people with disabilities. During the period of their activity, they helped to ensure equal treatment of individuals with disabilities both in the courts as well as the public sphere. They brought awareness to issues that were glossed over and invisible to the public eye as well as providing services and aid to their community.

== History ==
The United Handicapped Federation was a local group created in September 1974, in the Twin Cities of Minneapolis and Saint Paul, Minnesota. It primarily defended areas such as transportation, housing, employment, and constructive barriers. People with disabilities were becoming more inclined to creating power by the behavior of others with disabilities, thus bringing forth thinking in the terms of citizenship and rights. An increasing number of disabled people began to question their place in America which helped fuel the UHF to bring forth passion towards disability culture, politics, and growth. The UHF later disbanded in the mid-1990s, after accomplishing a significant amount of reform for people with disabilities.

== Law and reform ==
The UHF took part in court cases setting precedent for accommodating people with disabilities on public transportation. Following the precedent setting case, public transit systems using federal money were determined to have a duty to make "special efforts" to provide accommodations for people with disabilities and the elderly. This determination was based on legislation in the Urban Mass Transportation Act of 1964. The United Handicapped Federation facilitated and staged a variety of protests and awareness campaigns for individuals with disabilities. The UHF was recognized as a determining factor in legislation regarding the support of individuals who have been sexually assaulted and making prosecution against the perpetrators more effective.

== Community service ==
The United Handicapped Federation took part in developing a resource to make modular and reusable wheelchair ramps. It lobbied for people with disabilities in the Twin Cities area in order to give disabled individuals a voice in "the time-consuming and restrictive legislation process." During the 1970s the UHF took part in developing a universally accessible design for apartment buildings. They were involved in bringing awareness to prevalence of sexual and physical assault of people with disabilities.
