= Mark Miller (quarterback, born 1956) =

American football player (born 1956)

No. 15
- Position: Quarterback

Personal information
- Born: August 13, 1956 (age 70); Canton, Ohio, U.S.
- Listed height: 6 ft 2 in (1.88 m)
- Listed weight: 176 lb (80 kg)

Career information
- High school: Canton South (OH)
- College: Bowling Green
- NFL draft: 1978: 3rd round, 68th overall pick

Career history
- Cleveland Browns (1978–1979); Green Bay Packers (1980); Michigan Panthers (1983)

Career NFL statistics
- TD–INT: 1-5
- Yards: 243
- QB rating: 17.7
- Stats at Pro Football Reference

Mark George Miller (born August 13, 1956) is an American former professional football player who was a quarterback in the National Football League (NFL). He played with the Cleveland Browns (1978–1979) before being traded in August 1980 to the Green Bay Packers, where he saw no action. He was released by the Packers before the 1981 season. Miller then briefly resurfaced with the Michigan Panthers of the United States Football League (USFL) in 1983.

Miller had put together a solid college career with the Bowling Green Falcons (1974–1977), resulting in the Browns making him a third round selection in the 1978 NFL draft. During his brief career his role was that of a backup quarterback, consequently making his playing time limited. He attempted 47 passes, completed 15 for only 243 yards, seeing the most action in the 1978 regular season finale against the Cincinnati Bengals after replacing an injured Brian Sipe.
