= Novo Bojovic =

Yugoslav-born American football player (born 1959)

Profile
- Position: Placekicker

Personal information
- Born: November 2, 1959 (age 67); Titograd, Yugoslavia

Career information
- College: Central Michigan (1979–1982)
- NFL draft: 1983

Career history
- 1983–1984: Michigan Panthers
- 1985: Oakland Invaders
- 1985: St. Louis Cardinals
- 1988–1992: Detroit Drive

Awards and highlights
- 4× ArenaBowl champion (1988, 1989, 1990, 1992); First-team All-Arena (1990); Second-team All-Arena (1988); AFL Kicker of the Year (1990)
- Stats at Pro Football Reference

Novo Bojovic ((/boʊˈjoʊvɪtʃ/ boh-YOH-vitch; born November 2, 1959) is a Yugoslav-born American former placekicker. Bojovic played college football at Central Michigan before embarking on a career in professional football which lasted nine years.

== Early life ==
Bojovic graduated from Central Michigan University in 1983 with a B.A. in Business & Marketing.

== Playing career ==
Bojovic began his career in pro football with the United States Football League's Michigan Panthers in 1983. During Bojovic's rookie season of 1983 he played in his first of two USFL championship games. In the 1983 USFL championship game the Michigan Panthers defeated the Philadelphia Stars 24–22 to become USFL champions. After playing a second season with the Michigan Panthers in 1984 Bojovic along with other teammates joined the roster of the Oakland Invaders for the 1985 USFL season. This came about after the Michigan Panthers merged with Oakland Invaders following the 1984 season. Bojovic's career in the USFL ended with his second appearance in a USFL championship game. That year the Oakland Invaders lost to the Baltimore Stars 28–24 in the USFL's final championship game.

After three seasons in the USFL, Bojovic had a brief career in the National Football League playing with the St. Louis Cardinals in 1985. Bojovic played in just six games with the Cardinals during the 1985 season.

Bojovic next embarked on a successful five-year career in the Arena Football League with the Detroit Drive from 1988 to 1992. During his five years with the Detroit Drive the Drive won four Arena Bowl championships 1988, 1989, 1990 and 1992. In 1990, he was named Kicker of the Year by the AFL.

While playing in the USFL Bojovic wore No. 3 when playing with both Michigan and Oakland and No. 11 with the St. Louis Cardinals.

Quotes from USFLOnline.com: "It was strictly mental, because I never missed a winning kick, " says Bojovic, who is currently the president of B2B Industrial Supply group in the greater Detroit area. "When I missed that winning kick, it was over. I never had a chance, I needed someone to shake-me-up, just say ‘listen you son-a-bitch, you’re the bad ass, you're tough you can do it…you got us here, forget about that kick, it’s gone, it’s history.'"

“We were totally shocked and surprised," Bojovic said. "We have 63 or 64 thousand [fans] in the stadium; we had a rough start then we had a winning streak of six games, then we played the Invaders at home, to see the 63,000 plus in the stadium, that tells you the impact we made in the city of Detroit and the state of Michigan. It was a tremendous feeling that were making so much progress."

== Post career ==
Bojovic, utilized his business and marketing skills to embark on an over 25-year career in the Health & Safety field, and as of 2018 is the President of the B2B Industrial Supply Group based out of Michigan.

== Personal life ==
His grandparents were Albanians who migrated to Yugoslavia where he was raised. He moved to the United States at age 14 with his father, mother, sister and two brothers.
