= Jim Spavital =

American gridiron football player, coach and executive (1926–1993)

No. 77, 76
- Positions: Fullback, linebacker

Personal information
- Born: September 15, 1926; Oklahoma City, Oklahoma, U.S.
- Died: March 7, 1993 (aged 66); Stillwater, Oklahoma, U.S.
- Listed height: 6 ft 1 in (1.85 m)
- Listed weight: 210 lb (95 kg)

Career information
- High school: Edmond Memorial (Edmond, Oklahoma)
- College: Oklahoma A&M (1944, 1946–1948)
- NFL draft: 1948: 1st round, 11th overall pick

Career history

Playing
- Los Angeles Dons (1949); Baltimore Colts (1950); Winnipeg Blue Bombers (1951–1953)

Coaching
- Oklahoma State (1955–1962) Assistant; Saskatchewan Roughriders (1968–1969) Assistant; Winnipeg Blue Bombers (1970–1973) Head coach; Chicago Fire (1974) Head coach; New York Jets (1975) Offensive backfield; San Francisco 49ers (1976) Offensive backfield; Calgary Stampeders (1977–1978) Defensive backfield

Operations
- Saskatchewan Roughriders (1979–1982) General manager; Michigan Panthers (1983) General manager

Career NFL/AAFC statistics
- Rushing yards: 290
- Rushing average: 4
- Receptions: 22
- Receiving yards: 237
- Total touchdowns: 3
- Stats at Pro Football Reference

James J. Spavital (September 15, 1926 – March 7, 1993) was an American gridiron football player, coach and executive in six different professional football leagues. He served as the head coach of the Winnipeg Blue Bombers of the Canadian Football League (CFL) from 1970 to 1973 and as head coach of the Chicago Fire of the World Football League (WFL) in 1974. Spavital was the general manager of the CFL's Saskatchewan Roughriders from 1979 to 1982 and the Michigan Panthers of the United States Football League (USFL) in 1983.

== Playing career ==
Spavital played for the All-America Football Conference's Los Angeles Dons in 1949 and the National Football League's Baltimore Colts during the 1950 season. As a starter in 1950 he had 246 rushing yards and 238 receiving. His 96-yard rush against the Green Bay Packers on November 5, 1950, is the fourth longest run from scrimmage in NFL history. As an Airborne reservist, Spavital was called up in 1951 to serve in the Korean War. His reporting date prevented him from playing a full NFL season so he moved north of the border to play for the Winnipeg Blue Bombers of the Canadian Football League (CFL) enabling him to play a complete season prior to reporting for duty. Wear and tear on his feet effectively ended his playing career. He was also drafted by the New York Giants in the first round of the 1951 NFL draft after the Baltimore Colts folded.

== Coaching career ==
In 1955, Spavital joined the Oklahoma State coaching staff under coach Cliff Speegle. In 1968 he joined the Saskatchewan Roughriders as an assistant. In 1970 he was hired by the Winnipeg Blue Bombers as head coach. In four seasons as Bombers head coach, he had a 23–39–2 record and two playoff appearances.

In 1974, Spavital was hired as head coach of the Chicago Fire of the World Football League. The team finished 7–13 and folded after the season. In 1975 he joined the New York Jets, coaching the offensive backfield. The following season, he again coached the offensive backfield coach for San Francisco 49ers coach Monte Clark.

In 1977 Spavital returned to the CFL as an assistant coach with the Calgary Stampeders, rejoining a fellow assistant from Saskatchewan, Jack Gotta. In 1981 he was hired as general manager of the Saskatchewan Roughriders.

Spavital left the Roughriders after the season to join the Michigan Panthers of the United States Football League (USFL). In the league's first year, the Panthers won the USFL championship, defeating the Philadelphia Stars title game. On September 9, 1983, he resigned his post as Panthers GM. In 1989 Spavital was hired by Bill Byrne and Hubie Byrne to help put together a new professional football league to begin play in the spring or summer of 1990. Spavital was the director of football operations for the Professional Spring Football League (PSFL) for two years before plans for the league were abandoned.

Spavital's son, Steve, is the former head football coach at Broken Arrow Senior High in Broken Arrow, Oklahoma. Spavital is also the grandfather of former Texas State head coach Jake Spavital and Maryland linebackers coach Zac Spavital.
