= Craig Wederquist =

American football player and coach (born 1960)

Biographical details
- Born: October 26, 1960 (age 66)

Playing career
- 1979–1982: Drake
- 1983: Michigan Panthers
- Position: Offensive lineman

Coaching career (HC unless noted)
- 1984: Graceland (RB)
- 1985: Drake (DL)
- 1986–1987: Central Missouri State (OL)
- 1988–1989: Utah State (assistant OL)
- 1990–1991: Utah State (DL)
- 1992: Colorado State (DL)
- 1993: Iowa Wesleyan (assistant)
- 1994: Pacific (CA) (DL)
- 1995: Pacific (CA) (DC/DL)
- 1996: Tarleton State (DC)
- 1997–1999: Tarleton State
- 2000–2004: UNLV (DL)
- 2005: Northern Iowa (assistant DL)
- 2006–?: Saydel HS (IA)

Head coaching record
- Overall: 12–21 (college)

Craig Wederquist (born October 26, 1960) is an American former football coach. He served as head football coach at Tarleton State University in Stephenville, Texas from 1997 to 1999. Wederquist played college football as an offensive tackle at Drake University. He was selected by Michigan Panthers of the United States Football League (USFL) in the seventh round of the 1983 USFL draft with the 83rd overall pick. He signed with the new club, was placed on injured reserve during the team's inaugural season, and retired in 1984.

Wederquist worked as the defensive coordinator at the University of the Pacific before the Tigers dropped football after the 1995 season. After one season as defensive coordinator at Tarleton State, Wederquist replaced Todd Whitten as head coach. Wederquist is currently teaching at Saydel High School in Saylorville, Iowa.
