= Ted Sloane =

American football player, coach, and state legislator (1903–1984)

Biographical details
- Born: March 22, 1903; West Des Moines, Iowa, U.S.
- Died: December 21, 1984 (aged 81); Boca Raton, Florida, U.S.
- Education: Drake University, United States Naval Academy

Playing career
- 1923–1925: Drake
- 1927: Navy
- Position: End

Coaching career (HC unless noted)
- 1928–1930: Drake (line)

Accomplishments and honors

Awards
- First-team All-American (1925); First-team All-MVC (1925)

Theodore P. Sloane (March 22, 1903 – December 21, 1984) was an American football player and coach and state legislator.

Sloane attended Valley Junction High School in West Des Moines, Iowa, before enrolling at Drake University. He played college football at the end position for the Drake Bulldogs football team from 1923 to 1925. He was selected by the Football Writers Association of America as a first-team end on the 1925 College Football All-America Team. After the 1925 season, he was selected to play in the inaugural East–West Shrine Game. Sloane next attended the United States Naval Academy, where he played for the Navy Midshipmen football team.

Sloane then returned to Drake University where he studied law and served as the line coach for the football team. He was offered an opportunity to play professional football for the Chicago Bears of the National Football League (NFL), but he reportedly declined as the salary of $500 to $1,000 per year was less than he was able to make as a lawyer. Sloane also served five terms in the Iowa House of Representatives from 1943 to 1953.

Sloane was born on March 22, 1903, to L. T. and Rebecca (Shea) Sloane. He married Eleanor Louis Davis on March 21, 1937. The couple had a son, Ted, and a daughter, Mary. He died of cancer on December 21, 1984 in Boca Raton, Florida.
