= David Tipton (defensive tackle) =

American football player (born 1953)

No. 60
- Position: Defensive tackle

Personal information
- Born: December 10, 1953 (age 72); Superior, Wisconsin, U.S.
- Listed height: 6 ft 6 in (1.98 m)
- Listed weight: 245 lb (111 kg)

Career information
- College: Western Illinois
- NFL draft: 1975: undrafted

Career history
- New England Patriots (1975–1976); Hamilton Tiger-Cats (1978); Michigan Panthers (1983–1985); Arizona Outlaws (1985)
- Stats at Pro Football Reference

David Joseph Tipton (born December 10, 1953) is an American former professional football player who was a defensive tackle in the National Football League (NFL). He played for the New England Patriots (1975–1976) and then in the United States Football League (USFL) with the Arizona Outlaws in 1985. He played at the college football for the Western Illinois Leathernecks.

== See also ==
- New England Patriots players
