= Tom Bienemann =

American football player (1928–1999)

No. 60, 82
- Positions: Defensive end, Linebacker

Personal information
- Born: January 28, 1928; Kenosha, Wisconsin, U.S.
- Died: October 5, 1999 (aged 71); Kenosha, Wisconsin, U.S.
- Listed height: 6 ft 3 in (1.91 m)
- Listed weight: 221 lb (100 kg)

Career information
- College: Drake (1946–1949)
- NFL draft: 1951: 11th round, 127th overall pick

Career history
- Chicago Cardinals (1951–1956)

Career NFL statistics
- Interceptions: 4
- Receptions: 1
- Receiving yards: 8
- Kick returns: 2
- Return yards: 34
- Stats at Pro Football Reference

Tom Bienemann (January 28, 1928 – October 5, 1999) was a defensive end in the National Football League (NFL). He was drafted in the eleventh round of the 1951 NFL draft by the Chicago Cardinals and played six seasons with the team. Previously, he had been drafted in the 1950 NFL draft by the Cardinals, but remained in college at Drake University in Des Moines, IA.
