= David Greenwood (American football) =

American football player (born 1960)

No. 31, 30, 49, 41
- Positions: Safety, punter

Personal information
- Born: March 25, 1960 (age 66); Park Falls, Wisconsin, U.S.
- Listed height: 6 ft 3 in (1.91 m)
- Listed weight: 210 lb (95 kg)

Career information
- College: Wisconsin
- NFL draft: 1983: 8th round, 206th overall pick

Career history
- New Orleans Saints (1983)*; Michigan Panthers (1983-1984); Oakland Invaders (1985); Tampa Bay Buccaneers (1985); Green Bay Packers (1986-1987); Los Angeles Raiders (1988)
- * Offseason or practice squad member only

Awards and highlights
- 2× First-team All-Big Ten (1981, 1982)

Career NFL statistics
- Interceptions: 5
- Fumble recoveries: 1
- Sacks: 6.0
- Stats at Pro Football Reference

David Mark Greenwood (born March 25, 1960) is an American former professional football player who was a safety for three seasons in the National Football League (NFL). He was selected by the New Orleans Saints in the eighth round (206th overall) of the 1983 NFL Draft. Considered by many to be the greatest high school athlete in the history of Wisconsin, Greenwood excelled in track and basketball as well as football in high school. He still holds the Wisconsin prep high jump record (7'2") He went on to become a four-year starter at both safety and punter playing college football for the Wisconsin Badgers. Previously, he played in the United States Football League also as a punter for the Michigan Panthers and the Oakland Invaders. Before joining the USFL, he was expected to be a first-round-quality NFL draft pick, a strong hitter and blitzer who performed poorly at man-to-man coverage. He played in all 16 games for the Tampa Bay Buccaneers in 1985, starting 10, but was cut early in training camp the next year due to inconsistency. He blamed this on burnout, having started in the Buccaneers' season opener only one week after leaving the Invaders.

== Awards ==
The Sporting News All-League Team, 1983
