= Tyrone McGriff =

American football player (1958–2000)

No. 61, 68
- Position: Guard

Personal information
- Born: January 13, 1958; Vero Beach, Florida, U.S.
- Died: December 9, 2000 (aged 42); Melbourne, Florida, U.S.
- Listed height: 6 ft 2 in (1.88 m)
- Listed weight: 220 lb (100 kg)

Career information
- High school: Vero Beach
- College: Florida A&M
- NFL draft: 1980: 12th round, 333rd overall pick

Career history

Playing
- Pittsburgh Steelers (1980–1982); Michigan Panthers (1983–1984); Memphis Showboats (1985)

Coaching
- Florida A&M (1986–1988) Assistant; Tennessee State (1988–1989) Assistant; Bethune–Cookman (1990–1993) Assistant; Bethune–Cookman (1993) Interim head coach; Olympic Heights Community HS (FL) (1994) Head coach; Dillard HS (FL) (1995) Head coach; Fort Lauderdale HS (FL) (1996) Head coach; Grambling State (1998–1999) Offensive line

Awards and highlights
- PFWA All-Rookie Team (1980)

Career NFL statistics
- Games played: 36
- Games started: 10
- Stats at Pro Football Reference
- College Football Hall of Fame

Tyrone K. McGriff Sr. (January 13, 1958 – December 9, 2000) was an American professional football player and coach. He is an inductee of the College Football Hall of Fame.

== Biography ==
McGriff played college football as a guard for the Florida A&M Rattlers. The team finished with records of 11–0 and 12–1 in his sophomore (1977) and junior (1978) seasons, including a victory in the 1978 NCAA Division I-AA Football Championship Game. He was named an All-American of the NCAA College Division for the 1977, 1978, and 1979 seasons. McGriff was inducted to the Florida A&M athletic hall of fame in 1989. He was inducted into the College Football Hall of Fame in 1996.

McGriff was "Mr. Irrelevant" of the 1980 NFL draft, having been selected with the final pick (333rd overall). He went on to play in the National Football League (NFL) with the Pittsburgh Steelers for three seasons, and then played three seasons in the United States Football League (USFL). He was a member of the 1983 USFL champions as a starting guard for the Michigan Panthers, for whom he also played in 1984 before playing the 1985 season with the Memphis Showboats.

After his playing career, McGriff held several coaching roles in college football, including two games as interim head coach of the Bethune–Cookman Wildcats in 1993. He also served as a head coach at three high schools in Florida.

McGriff died in December 2000, two weeks after suffering of a heart attack. At the time of his death, he was employed as director of the Gifford Youth Activity Center in Vero Beach, Florida. He was survived by his two children, April and Tyrone McGriff Jr., and wife, Barbara Rollins McGriff.

== Head coaching record ==
=== College ===
Year	Team	Overall	Conference	Standing	Bowl/playoffs
Bethune–Cookman Wildcats (Mid-Eastern Athletic Conference) (1993)
1993	Bethune–Cookman (Note: Sylvester Collins served as head coach before he was suspended after the first nine games of the 1993 season. McGriff replaced Collins as acting head coach for the final two games. Bethune–Cookman finished 1–10 overall and 0–6 in Mid-Eastern Athletic Conference play.)	1–1	0–1	7th	
Bethune–Cookman:		1–1	0–1		
Total:		1–1			
