= Dick Steere =

American gridiron football player (1927–2021)

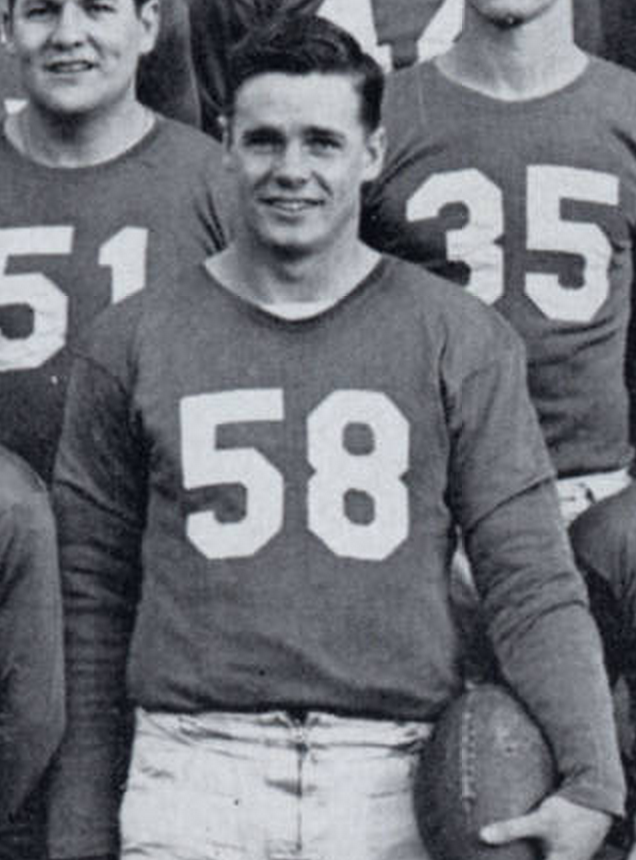
- Steere at Drake, c. 1950

No. 72, 64
- Position: Guard

Personal information
- Born: March 2, 1927; Chicago, Illinois, U.S.
- Died: May 3, 2021 (aged 94); Dyer, Indiana, U.S.
- Listed height: 6 ft 4 in (1.93 m)
- Listed weight: 240 lb (109 kg)

Career information
- High school: Harvey (IL) Thornton
- College: Drake
- NFL draft: 1951: 5th round, 53rd overall pick

Career history
- Philadelphia Eagles (1951); Edmonton Eskimos (1952)

Career NFL statistics
- Games played: 5
- Games started: 1
- Stats at Pro Football Reference

Edward Richard Steere (March 2, 1927 – May 3, 2021) was an American professional football guard who played for the Philadelphia Eagles and Edmonton Eskimos. He played college football at Drake University, having previously attended Thornton Township High School in Harvey, Illinois.

He died on May 3, 2021, at the age of 94.
