= Ray Pinney =

American football player (born 1954)

No. 53, 74, 65
- Positions: Offensive tackle, guard

Personal information
- Born: June 29, 1954 (age 72); Seattle, Washington, U.S.
- Listed height: 6 ft 4 in (1.93 m)
- Listed weight: 251 lb (114 kg)

Career information
- High school: Shorecrest (Shoreline, Washington)
- College: Washington
- NFL draft: 1976: 2nd round, 37th overall pick

Career history
- Pittsburgh Steelers (1976–1982); Michigan Panthers (1983); Oakland Invaders (1984–1985); Pittsburgh Steelers (1985–1987)

Awards and highlights
- 2× Super Bowl champion (XIII, XIV); USFL champion (1983); All-USFL (1985); Second-team All-American (1975); First-team All-Pac-8 (1975)

Career NFL statistics
- Games: 125
- Games started: 81
- Stats at Pro Football Reference

Raymond Earl Pinney Jr. (born June 29, 1954) is an American former professional football player who was an offensive tackle and guard seven seasons with the Pittsburgh Steelers of the National Football League (NFL). He played college football for the Washington Huskies and was selected by the Steelers in the second round of the 1976 NFL draft and started for them during their Super Bowl XIII victory. He also spent three seasons in the United States Football League (USFL).

== Professional career ==
=== Pittsburgh Steelers (first stint) ===
Pinney was selected in the second round of the 1976 NFL draft (37th overall) by the two-time defending Super Bowl champion Pittsburgh Steelers. He played college football at the University of Washington in Seattle under head coaches Jim Owens and Don James and was a team captain for the Huskies in 1974 and 1975.

As a rookie in 1976, Pinney was a backup tackle and appeared in 14 regular season games. The following season, he played in 14 regular season games with two starts. Pinney earned the start at right tackle in Super Bowl XIII in January 1979 over Larry Brown, who had been the starter the majority of the season. He earned his first Super Bowl ring in the 35–31 victory over the Dallas Cowboys. Pinney missed the entire 1979 season due to injuries. Although he was on the roster, he sat in the stands at the Rose Bowl during the Super Bowl XIV, a 31–19 victory over the Los Angeles Rams.

Pinney returned in 1980 but changed position as Brown had solidified himself as the starting right tackle in his absence; he started all 16 regular season games in 1980 at left guard. He began the 1981 season as the Pittsburgh's starting left tackle, winning the job over longtime starter Jon Kolb, and had 11 starts and appeared in all 16 games. During the 1982 season, Pinney started all nine games at left tackle.

=== Michigan Panthers ===
With the upstart USFL coming in fruition, Pinney was targeted along with other Steeler players. He signed with the Michigan Panthers after they had offered him twice his previous salary. He played offensive tackle for them and helped them win the USFL Championship in 1983.

=== Oakland Invaders ===
After the 1984 season, the Michigan Panthers merged with the Oakland Invaders. Pinney played the 1985 season (spring) with the Invaders until the USFL ceased operations.

=== Pittsburgh Steelers (second stint) ===
After the USFL folded, Pinney returned to the Pittsburgh Steelers; he cited he was brought back because the Steelers knew he could play and he wasn't a locker room distraction. He resumed his starting left tackle duties from three years earlier and played in 15 games with 11 starts in 1985 and started fifteen games in 1986. In his last season in 1987 at age 33, Pinney played in six games and was hampered by injuries. He had announced that he cleared out his locker at the end of the season, and Steelers' owner Dan Rooney notified him by phone that his contract would not be renewed.
