= Oliver Davis (American football) =

American football player (born 1954)

No. 21
- Position: Cornerback

Personal information
- Born: August 29, 1954 (age 72); Columbus, Georgia, U.S.
- Listed height: 6 ft 1 in (1.85 m)
- Listed weight: 203 lb (92 kg)

Career information
- High school: Mount Olive
- College: Tennessee State
- NFL draft: 1977: 4th round, 102nd overall pick

Career history
- Cleveland Browns (1977–1980); Cincinnati Bengals (1981–1982)

Career NFL statistics
- Interceptions: 11
- INT yards: 239
- Touchdowns: 1
- Stats at Pro Football Reference

Oliver James Davis (born August 29, 1954) is an American former professional football player who was a cornerback in the National Football League (NFL). He played college football for the Tennessee State Tigers and was selected by the Cleveland Browns in the fourth round of the 1977 NFL draft. He played in Super Bowl XVI against the San Francisco 49ers.

Davis also played for the Cincinnati Bengals.
