= Thom Dornbrook =

American football player (born 1956)

No. 63, 61
- Position: Guard

Personal information
- Born: December 1, 1956 (age 69); Pittsburgh, Pennsylvania, U.S.
- Listed height: 6 ft 2 in (1.88 m)
- Listed weight: 240 lb (109 kg)

Career information
- High school: North Hills (PA)
- College: Kentucky
- NFL draft: 1978: undrafted

Career history
- Pittsburgh Steelers (1978–1979); Miami Dolphins (1980); Michigan Panthers (1983–1984); Orlando Renegades (1985)

Awards and highlights
- 2× Super Bowl champion (XIII, XIV); First-team All-SEC (1977)

Career NFL statistics
- Games played: 20
- Games started: 1
- Stats at Pro Football Reference

Thomas Dornbrook (born December 1, 1956) is an American former professional football player who was a center and guard for two seasons with the Pittsburgh Steelers of the National Football League (NFL). He played college football for the Kentucky Wildcats. In 1979, Dornbrook earned a ring in Super Bowl XIV over the Los Angeles Rams. He played for the Miami Dolphins in 1980. He later played in the United States Football League (USFL) and won the 1983 USFL championship as the starting guard for the Michigan Panthers. He played for Michigan in 1983 and 1984 and in 1985 for the Orlando Renegades.
