= Mike Samples =

American gridiron football player (born 1950)

No. 55, 62, 66
- Position: Defensive tackle

Personal information
- Born: May 27, 1950 (age 76); Bonne Terre, Missouri, U.S.
- Listed height: 6 ft 2 in (1.88 m)
- Listed weight: 245 lb (111 kg)

Career information
- College: Drake
- NFL draft: 1973: 12th round, 298th overall pick

Career history
- 1973: BC Lions
- 1974–1977: Hamilton Tiger-Cats
- 1978–1983: Saskatchewan Roughriders

Awards and highlights
- CFL All-Star (1982); CFL East All-Star (1976); 2× CFL West All-Star (1981, 1982)

Mike Samples (born May 27, 1950) is a former professional Canadian football player who played eleven seasons in the Canadian Football League (CFL) for three teams. He was named CFL All-Star in 1981. In August 1983 he retired as a player and became an assistant coach for the Saskatchewan Roughriders.
