= Derek Holloway =

American football player (born 1961)

No. 88, 83
- Position: Wide receiver/defensive back

Personal information
- Born: January 17, 1961 (age 65); Riverside, New Jersey, U.S.
- Listed height: 5 ft 9 in (1.75 m)
- Listed weight: 170 lb (77 kg)

Career information
- College: Arkansas

Career history
- Michigan Panthers (1983–1984); Oakland Invaders (1985); Washington Redskins (1986); Tampa Bay Buccaneers (1987); Calgary Stampeders (1991); Sacramento Surge (1991); Detroit Drive (1992); Buffalo Destroyers (1999)

Awards and highlights
- LED USFL in 1983 with 19.8 yards per catch; ArenaBowl VI champion (1992)

Career statistics
- Receptions: 1
- Yards: 7
- Touchdowns: 0
- Stats at Pro Football Reference

Career AFL statistics
- Receptions: 32
- Yards: 414
- Touchdowns: 7
- Tackles: 8
- Forced fumbles: 1
- Stats at ArenaFan.com

Derek Lance Holloway (born January 17, 1961) is a former wide receiver in the United States Football League (USFL), the National Football League (NFL) the Canadian Football League (CFL), the World League of American Football (WLAF) and the Arena Football League (AFL).

== Early life ==
Holloway played high school football at Palmyra High School in Palmyra, New Jersey. He led the state in scoring his senior year, 1978, scoring a record 188 points including 31 touchdowns and two extra points. That year, his team won the South Jersey Group I [small school] championship.

== College career ==
Holloway played college football at the University of Arkansas. He set a variety of school records, including most receiving yards in a bowl game and longest scoring reception in a bowl game (both in the 1981 Gator Bowl). He led the Southwest Conference in kickoff returns in 1982.

== Professional career ==
=== USFL ===
Holloway also played for the 1983 USFL Champion Michigan Panthers where he scored the first two touchdowns in the first ever Championship Game in Denver, Colorado. He later played for the Oakland Invaders after the Panthers merged with them.

=== NFL ===
Holloway played in the NFL for the Washington Redskins and the Tampa Bay Buccaneers.

=== CFL ===
Holloway played for the Calgary Stampeders of the Canadian Football League in the 1988 season.

=== AFL ===
Holloway played with the Detroit Drive of the Arena Football League in 1992, helping the Drive with their 4th ArenaBowl Championship. He made a comeback in 1999 when he signed with the Buffalo Destroyers.

== USFL career statistics ==
Legend
Won USFL Championship

Year	Team	Games		Receiving					Kick Returns					Rushing				
Year	Team	GP	GS	Rec	Yds	Avg	Lng	TD	Att	Yds	Avg	Lng	TD	Att	Yds	Avg	Lng	TD
1983	Michigan Panthers	18	17	39	811	20.8	69	11	13	254	19.5	31	0	2	4	2.0	12	0
1984	Michigan Panthers	18	17	62	1,219	19.7	80	9	0	0	0	0	0	0	0	0	0	0
1985	Oakland Invaders	18	0	47	824	17.5	64	7	0	0	0	0	0	0	0	0	0	0
		54	34	148	2854	19.3	80	27	13	254	19.5	31	0	2	4	2.0	12	0

== Sprinting ==
Holloway has also been highly ranked as a competitive sprinter. His career has extended from school days to masters athletics.
