= Ken Lacy =

American football player (born 1960)

Profile
- Position: Running back

Personal information
- Born: November 1, 1960 (age 66); Waco, Texas, U.S.

Career information
- College: University of Tulsa

Career history
- 1983-1984: Michigan Panthers
- 1984–1987: Kansas City Chiefs
- Stats at Pro Football Reference

Ken Lacy (born November 1, 1960) is an American former football player who played running back for four seasons for the Kansas City Chiefs of the National Football League (NFL). Lacy also played for the USFL champion Michigan Panthers in 1983.
