= Michigan Panthers =

Former professional American football team

General information
- Founded: 1982
- Folded: 1984
- Headquartered: Pontiac Silverdome in Pontiac, Michigan
- Colors: Royal Plum, Champagne Silver, Light Blue, White

Personnel
- Owner: 1983–1984 A. Alfred Taubman
- Head coach: 1983–1984 Jim Stanley (24–15)

Team history
- Michigan Panthers (1983–1984); merged with Oakland Invaders (1985)

Home fields
- Pontiac Silverdome (1983–1984)

League / conference affiliations
- United States Football League (1983–1985): Western Conference (1984); Central Division (1983–1984)

Championships
- League championships: 1; 1983
- Division championships: 1; 1983

Playoff appearances (2)
- 1983, 1984

The Michigan Panthers were a professional American football team based in Metro Detroit. The Panthers competed in the United States Football League (USFL) as a member of the Western Conference and Central Division. The team played its home games at the Pontiac Silverdome in Pontiac, Michigan.

Amid financial struggles following the 1984 season, the team was merged with the Oakland Invaders in 1985, where they would operate under the Invaders name.

The Panthers won the inaugural USFL Championship, 24–22 over the Philadelphia Stars.

== Team history ==
The Michigan Panthers were named as a charter member of the United States Football League (USFL) on May 11, 1982. A. Alfred Taubman, one of the nation's leading real estate developers, headed the ownership group that included Judge Peter B. Spivak and Max M. Fisher.

The Panthers named Jim Spavital, general manager of the Canadian Football League's Saskatchewan Roughriders, as their general manager on August 26, 1982. Michigan then hired Jim Stanley as their head coach on November 18, 1982, after George Perles decided to coach at Michigan State. Stanley brought a wealth of coaching experience, with stops at SMU, UTEP, Oklahoma State, Navy, and on the professional level with the CFL's Winnipeg Blue Bombers, and NFL's New York Giants and Atlanta Falcons, mainly as an assistant coach. Stanley would be the club's only head coach. The coaching staff was rounded out by Larry Coyer, Pete Rodriguez, and Dick Roach (Defensive coaches). George Dickson, Bob Leahy, and Kent Stephenson were the offensive coaches.

The Pontiac Silverdome was the home of the Panthers. In the 1980s, most NFL teams did not have complete schedule control over their stadiums, which became common practice in the aftermath of the original USFL, so the Detroit Lions could not have blocked the Panthers (publicly, the Lions avoided discussion of the USFL). C. Bruce Martin, the ideologue behind Godstock, was the first male cheerleader for a professional football team when he cheered for the Michigan Panthers.

The USFL's first collegiate draft was held on January 4, 1983. The Panthers selected Wisconsin SS David Greenwood with their first round (10th overall) selection.

They also tabbed Michigan WR Anthony Carter in the USFL Territorial Draft – a process whereby USFL teams could protect up to 25 graduating seniors from a series of local universities. The Panthers had territorial rights to the University of Michigan, Michigan State, Eastern Michigan, Central Michigan and Western Michigan. The Panthers used this draft to select two placekickers. One was Novo Bojovic, and the other was Michigan's Ali Haji-Sheikh. Sheikh spurned the Panthers to sign with the New York Giants of the NFL.

Michigan made a splash in signing some of the top young NCAA prospects in 1983 in Michigan WR Anthony Carter, Tulsa RB Ken Lacy, Wisconsin SS David Greenwood and QB Bobby Hebert of Northwestern State (La.). The Panthers also had a few key players with NFL experience. Tackle Ray Pinney and Tyrone McGriff had played for the Super Bowl Pittsburgh Steelers teams. Linebacker John Corker had played three seasons for the Houston Oilers. The Panthers also landed three former Cleveland Browns starters in running back Cleo Miller, defensive back Oliver Davis, and quarterback Mark Miller. The team also had former All-Pro punter Bob Grupp, who had played for the NFL's Kansas City Chiefs. However, Grupp had been a one-season wonder in Kansas City, and after a few inconsistent weeks, he was released, and safety David Greenwood did double duty taking over as the team's punter. Future Buffalo Bills linebacker and children's book author Ray Bentley was also a Michigan Panther.

=== 1983 season highlights ===
Michigan held its first training camp at City Island Stadium in Daytona Beach, Florida, sifting through over 75 players.

On Monday, March 7, 1983; the Panthers opened the season with a 9–7 win over the Birmingham Stallions at Legion Field in Birmingham, Alabama. This was the first professional football game ever broadcast on ESPN. Serbian kicker (via Central Michigan) Novo Bojovic kicked the winning field goal from 48 yards out in the waning moments.

The Panthers then dropped their next four contests, losing on March 12 to the Tampa Bay Bandits (19–7); Mar. 19 at home to the Oakland Invaders (33–27); Mar. 27 at the Washington Federals (22–16 in OT) and April 4 at home to the Denver Gold (29–21). Their slow start was attributed mostly due to a very porous offensive line that struggled to create holes or time for their offensive stars. Management addressed the issue by signing a bevy of experienced offensive linemen in OT Ray Pinney (Pittsburgh Steelers), OG Tyrone McGriff (Pittsburgh Steelers) and OG Thom Dornbrook (NY Giants). Dornbrook and McGriff would both make USFL all-league teams in 1983.

The Panthers had a six-game winning streak. Then, on May 23, they and the Birmingham Stallions were tied 20–20 in the fourth quarter. Michigan would have had the lead, but the extra point attempt was blocked. The game went into overtime and was won by Birmingham thanks to a 46-yard field goal by Stallions kicker Scott Norwood.

The Panthers would bounce back with a 42–7 thrashing of the stellar Tampa Bay Bandits, coached by future Florida Gators head coach Steve Spurrier. The additions on the offensive line, combined with installing rookie Bobby Hebert as quarterback, helped the Panthers win 11 of their next 13 contests to finish with a 12–6 record. They actually tied the Chicago Blitz for the best record in the Central Division, but were awarded the division title after sweeping the Blitz in the regular season.

In the playoffs, the Panthers hosted the Western Division champion Oakland Invaders before a USFL-record crowd of 60,237. The Panthers' decisive 37–21 victory vaulted them to the inaugural USFL championship game in Denver, Colorado.

On July 17, 1983, the Panthers captured the USFL's first championship with a 24–22 win over the Atlantic Division champion Philadelphia Stars. QB Bobby Hebert hit WR Anthony Carter on a 48-yard touchdown strike with 3:11 left in the fourth quarter for what proved to be the deciding score. Hebert was named MVP of the game, throwing for 319 yards and three touchdowns.

The Panthers' late season surge (counting the playoffs, they went 13–2 to finish the season) was fueled by the addition of NFL-comparable talent at several positions. Indeed, they were one of three USFL teams, along with the Stars and Blitz, that observers believed could have made a good account of themselves in the NFL. It came at a high price, however; they spent $6 million during the season—three times what USFL founder David Dixon recommended that a team spend in a single season.

=== 1984 season highlights ===
The Panthers were expected to roll to another Central Division title in 1984. Due to expansion, they were now in a Central Division with three expansion teams and a Blitz squad that had swapped nearly all of its players with the last place Arizona Wranglers. They initially didn't disappoint, sweeping their first six games. However, in the sixth game, a win over the expansion San Antonio Gunslingers, star receiver Anthony Carter broke his arm and was lost for the season. Without their chief offensive weapon the Panthers promptly went into a tailspin, losing eight of their next ten games (the Panthers' only wins in this stretch both came in overtime) to sink to an 8–8 record. Needing to win their last two games against Oklahoma and Chicago just to make the playoffs, Michigan did just that, finishing 10–8.

The first round playoff game against the Los Angeles Express (in a less-than-tenth-filled Los Angeles Coliseum) turned out to be longest professional football game in history. The Panthers took a 21–13 lead in the fourth quarter, only to have future Hall of Famer Steve Young throw a touchdown pass, then personally score the two-point conversion to tie the game at 21 with 52 seconds remaining. The Panthers had chances to win the game in both the first and second overtimes, but normally reliable kicker Novo Bojovic missed field goals each time. Finally, in the third overtime, rookie Mel Gray (who would later play for the Detroit Lions) ran 24 yards to give LA a 27–21 victory, ending pro football's longest day after 93 minutes and 33 seconds of play time. (Gray's touchdown would prove to be painful for the young star—the force of the tackle at the end of the play broke his arm.)

It turned out to be the Panthers' last game. After the 1984 season was over USFL owners, largely under the influence of New Jersey Generals owner Donald Trump and Chicago franchise owner Eddie Einhorn began talking seriously about moving to a fall schedule in 1986. While the Panthers had developed a loyal following, Taubman was a strong believer in the original spring football concept. He also had no desire to compete with the Detroit Lions. Not only was he a decades-long Lions fan, but he was a longtime friend of Lions owner William Clay Ford.

The Panthers had been far more successful on the field than the Lions; at the time of the USFL's founding, the Lions had tallied only three winning seasons since the NFL-AFL merger, and had only made the playoffs once in a non-strike year since winning their last league title in 1957. However, Taubman knew that he wouldn't have even begun to be able to go head-to-head with the Lions even if he'd been inclined to do so. According to personnel director Mike Keller, the only colleges within reasonable driving distance of Detroit would not even consider opening their doors to a Panthers team playing in the fall, meaning that they would have had to play home games on Wednesdays or Thursdays. However, Taubman believed the Panthers would not have been able to get a lease for the Silverdome in the fall. Even before then, a study of market conditions concluded that despite having a decent following by USFL standards, the Panthers would have been "better off moving out of the Michigan market" due to exorbitant advertising rates and a fan base with little tolerance for losing.

Taubman felt like the move was a foregone conclusion. As a result, after the merger between the Oakland Invaders and the Oklahoma Outlaws collapsed, Taubman quietly approached Invaders owner Tad Taube about a possible merger with his Panthers. When the league owners met to vote on moving to the fall, Taubman sent his son, Robert, with a message for the commissioner—if the teams voted to move to the fall, the Panthers would merge with the Invaders, with the Invaders as the surviving team. When the vote to play in the fall passed, the Panthers and Invaders announced their merger, with Taubman as majority owner of the Invaders.

=== Aftermath ===
Bolstered by a number of Panthers players, the Invaders made it all the way to the 1984 USFL Championship Game. They lost to the now-Baltimore Stars in a rematch of sorts of the 1983 title game.

It would be the last down that the merged team would play. After the USFL received only $3 in its antitrust lawsuit against the NFL, on which it had staked its survival, the league suspended operations and never returned. The league's abandonment of the Detroit market was a major factor behind the adverse jury award. Even before the trial, the Invaders suspended operations after Taubman pulled out altogether.

The A-11 Football League (A11FL), a planned spring football league which had intended to start play in 2015, had announced its intention to revive the Michigan Panthers for one of its charter franchises.

On November 22, 2021, a new version of the USFL announced that the Michigan Panthers would be one of eight teams in the league's re-launch in the spring of 2022.

== Single season leaders ==
- Rushing Yards: 1182 (1983), Ken Lacy
- Receiving Yards: 1220 (1984), Derek Holloway
- Passing Yards: 3368 (1984), Bobby Hebert

== Season by season ==
Season records
| Season | W | L | T | Finish | Playoff results |
|---|---|---|---|---|---|
| 1983 | 12 | 6 | 0 | 1st Central | Won Divisional (Oakland); Won USFL Championship (Philadelphia) |
| 1984 | 10 | 8 | 0 | 2nd WC Central | Lost Quarterfinal (Los Angeles) |
| Totals | 24 | 15 | 0 | (including playoffs) | |

== Game results ==
=== 1984 ===
| Week | Date | Opponent | Result | Record | Venue | Attendance |
Preseason
| 1 | Bye | | | | | |
| 2 | February 4 | vs. Chicago Blitz | W 21–20 | 1–0 | Scottsdale, Arizona | |
| 3 | February 11 | vs. Los Angeles Express | W 10–0 | 2–0 | Tempe, Arizona | |
| 4 | February 18 | vs. Oakland Invaders | L 6–7 | 2–1 | Mesa, Arizona | |
Regular season
| 1 | February 27 | Chicago Blitz | W 20–18 | 1–0 | Pontiac Silverdome | 22,428 |
| 2 | March 3 | Pittsburgh Maulers | W 27–24 | 2–0 | Pontiac Silverdome | 44,485 |
| 3 | March 11 | at Denver Gold | W 28–0 | 3–0 | Mile High Stadium | 41,623 |
| 4 | March 18 | Arizona Wranglers | W 31–26 | 4–0 | Pontiac Silverdome | 43,130 |
| 5 | March 26 | at Houston Gamblers | W 52–34 | 5–0 | Houston Astrodome | 38,754 |
| 6 | April 1 | San Antonio Gunslingers | W 26–10 | 6–0 | Pontiac Silverdome | 42,692 |
| 7 | April 7 | at Oklahoma Outlaws | L 17–20 | 6–1 | Skelly Stadium | 21,510 |
| 8 | April 15 | Birmingham Stallions | L 17–28 | 6–2 | Pontiac Silverdome | 42,655 |
| 9 | April 23 | Tampa Bay Bandits | L 7–20 | 6–3 | Pontiac Silverdome | 31,433 |
| 10 | April 29 | at New Jersey Generals | L 21–31 | 6–4 | Giants Stadium | 50,908 |
| 11 | May 6 | Houston Gamblers | W 31–28 (OT) | 7–4 | Pontiac Silverdome | 29,068 |
| 12 | May 13 | at New Orleans Breakers | L 3–10 | 7–5 | Louisiana Superdome | 21,053 |
| 13 | May 20 | at Los Angeles Express | L 17–24 | 7–6 | Los Angeles Memorial Coliseum | 10,193 |
| 14 | May 27 | Philadelphia Stars | L 13–31 | 7–7 | Pontiac Silverdome | 20,387 |
| 15 | June 1 | at San Antonio Gunslingers | W 23–17 (OT) | 8–7 | Alamo Stadium | 16,384 |
| 16 | June 9 | at Oakland Invaders | L 13–20 | 8–8 | Oakland–Alameda County Coliseum | 23,918 |
| 17 | June 18 | Oklahoma Outlaws | W 34–24 | 9–8 | Pontiac Silverdome | 15,838 |
| 18 | June 24 | at Chicago Blitz | W 20–17 | 10–8 | Soldier Field | 5,557 |
Playoffs
| Divisional Playoff(1) | June 30 | at Los Angeles Express | L 21–27 (3OT) | 0–1 | Los Angeles Memorial Coliseum | 7,409 |

(1) – Longest game in professional football history.
