= 1983 New Jersey Generals season =

Defunct football team in the USFL

- Owner: J. Walter Duncan
- General manager: Chuck Fairbanks
- Head coach: Chuck Fairbanks
- Home stadium: Giants Stadium

Results
- Record: 6–12
- Division place: 3rd Atlantic Division
- Playoffs: Did not qualify

The 1983 season was the inaugural season for the New Jersey Generals in the United States Football League. The Generals were led by head coach Chuck Fairbanks and finished with a 6–12 record.

From the beginning, USFL founder David Dixon placed a premium on putting a team in the New York area. Initially, Donald Trump was tapped to own the team. However, he backed out after paying an initial installment on the franchise fee, hoping instead to buy the struggling Baltimore Colts of the NFL. Needing a credible owner with the means to front a team in the nation's biggest market, Dixon persuaded Oklahoma oil magnate J. Walter Duncan to step in. Duncan had originally been slated to own the USFL's Chicago franchise, as he'd grown up in Chicago. However, he readily agreed to shift to New York.

Duncan took on former New England Patriots coach Chuck Fairbanks as a minority partner; Duncan knew Fairbanks from his days as head coach at the University of Oklahoma. Fairbanks also served as general manager and head coach. They initially had an uphill battle to get a lease at Giants Stadium, but were able to obtain one on condition that they brand their team as "New Jersey" rather than "New York." They named the team the "Generals" after the large number of generals based in New Jersey during the Revolutionary War.

The team made a big splash by signing Heisman Trophy-winning underclassman Herschel Walker, a running back from the University of Georgia. While the USFL had followed the NFL's lead in banning underclassmen from playing, league officials were certain that this rule would never withstand a court challenge. In an even more ominous development, Walker did not sign a standard player contract. Rather, he agreed to a three-year personal-services contract with Duncan. The contract was valued at $4.2 million—more than double the USFL's salary cap of $1.8 million. Nonetheless, the other owners knew having the incumbent Heisman winner in their fold would lend the USFL instant credibility, and allowed the contract to stand.

Despite the signing of Walker, who rushed for 1,812 yards and 17 touchdowns, the Generals finished their inaugural season with a 6–12 record. This was largely due to a porous defense which gave up the third-most points in the league (437) and a feeble passing attack led by ex-New Orleans Saints career backup Bobby Scott.

== Personnel ==
=== Staff ===
1983 New Jersey Generals staff
Front office: Owner – J. Walter Duncan; General manager – Chuck Fairbanks; Head coaches: Head coach – Chuck Fairbanks; Offensive coaches: Offensive Coordinator - Bill Austin; Quarterbacks – John Polonchek; Wide receivers – Mike Stock; Tight ends – Mike Stock; Offensive line – Bill Austin	Defensive coaches: Defensive Coordinator - Doug Knotts; Defensive line – George Wheeler; Linebackers – Doug Knotts; Defensive backs – Dick Moseley; Special teams coaches: Special teams coordinator – Rick Buffington

=== Roster ===
1983 New Jersey Generals roster
Quarterbacks (QB): 11 Dave Boisture; 16 Jeff Knapple; Running backs (RB): 44 Vickey Ray Anderson; 36 Thomas Lott; 22 Lance Olander P; 46 Dwight Sullivan; 34 Herschel Walker; Wide receivers (WR): 88 Mike Friede; 86 Tom McConnaughey; 85 Mark Slawson; 84 Walter Tullis; Tight ends (TE): 89 Sam Bowers; 81 Victor Hicks	Offensive linemen (OL): 75 Ted Cirillo T; 64 Wayne Harris G; 58 Kent Hull C; 70 John Jewell G; 63 Troy McMillin G; 51 Frank Naylor C/G; 77 Todd Thomas T; 68 Kari Yli-Renko T; Defensive linemen (DL): 95 Joe Cugliari DE; 79 Scott Dawson NT; 96 James Lockette DE; 90 Mel Lunsford DE; 93 Rod Skillman NT; 71 Tom Woodland NT	Linebackers (LB): 59 Maurice Clemmons ILB; 55 Ray Costict ILB; 54 Steve Hammond ILB; 47 John Joyce ILB; 49 Fred Lang OLB; 53 Mike McKibben; 56 Rod Shoate OLB; 52 Mike Weddington OLB; Defensive backs (DB): 24 Terry Daniels CB; 26 Don Harris SS; 23 William Holliday CB; 37 Dana Joel SS/CB; 20 Terry Porter CB; 27 Sam Sopp FS; 29 Mike Williams CB; Special teams (ST): 4 John Roveto K	Practice squad: 12 Gene Bradley QB; 80 Larry Brodsky WR; 33 Maurice Carthon FB; -- Joey Hackett TE; -- John Nord G/T; -- Cal Perkins DE; 98 Ricky Williamson DE; Reserve: 35 Larry Coffey RB (IR); -- Kolas Elion WR (Exempt); 50 Reggie Mathis LB (IR); 76 Bryan Millard T (IR); 21 Keith Moody S (IR); 78 Greg Murtha T (IR); -- Marlin Russell LB (IR); Rookies in italics

== USFL draft ==
Round	Pick	Player	Position	School
1	5	Gary Anderson	Running Back	Arkansas
2	22	Mark Stewart	Linebacker	Washington
2	24	Darryl Talley	Linebacker	Washington
3	27	Ramsey Dardar	Defensive Tackle	LSU
4	46	Wes Hopkins	Defensive Back	SMU
5	51	Wayne Harris	Guard	Mississippi State
5	60	Mark Cooper	Offensive Tackle	Miami
6	70	Randy Grimes	Center	Bayler
7	75	Kent Hull	Center	Mississippi State
8	94	Maurice Carthon	Running Back	Arkansas State
9	99	Marlin Russell	Linebacker	Toledo
10	118	Charles Benson	Defensive End	Baylor
11	123	Danny Walters	Defensive Back	Arkansas
12	142	Bryan Millard	Offensive Tackle	Texas
13	147	Ricky Williamson	Defensive End	Mars Hill
14	166	James Britt	Defensive Back	LSU

== Schedule ==
Week	Date	Opponent	Result	Record	Venue	Attendance
1	March 6	at Los Angeles Express	L 15–20	0–1	Los Angeles Memorial Coliseum	34,002
2	March 13	at Philadelphia Stars	L 0–25	0–2	Veterans Stadium	38,205
3	March 20	Tampa Bay Bandits	L 9–32	0–3	Giants Stadium	53,307
4	March 27	Boston Breakers	L 21–31	0–4	Giants Stadium	41,218
5	April 3	at Arizona Wranglers	W 35–21	1–4	Sun Devil Stadium	31,382
6	April 10	Michigan Panthers	L 6–21	1–5	Giants Stadium	17,648
7	April 17	Washington Federals	W 23–22	2–5	Giants Stadium	35,381
8	April 25	at Chicago Blitz	L 14–17 (OT)	2–6	Soldier Field	32,182
9	May 1	at Denver Gold	W 34–29	3–6	Mile High Stadium	47,940
10	May 9	Birmingham Stallions	L 7–22	3–7	Giants Stadium	38,374
11	May 16	at Michigan Panthers	L 24–31	3–8	Pontiac Silverdome	32,862
12	May 22	Chicago Blitz	L 13–19 (OT)	3–9	Giants Stadium	33,812
13	May 29	at Washington Federals	W 32–29	4–9	RFK Stadium	11,264
14	June 4	at Oakland Invaders	L 21–34	4–10	Oakland-Alameda County Coliseum	32,908
15	June 12	Philadelphia Stars	L 9–23	4–11	Giants Stadium	20,500
16	June 17	Los Angeles Express	W 20–12	5–11	Giants Stadium	31,807
17	June 25	Arizona Wranglers	W 21–14	6–11	Giants Stadium	30,612
18	July 3	at Boston Breakers	L 10–34	6–12	Nickerson Field	15,798

== Standings ==
USFL Atlantic Division
	W	L	T	PCT	DIV	PF	PA	STK
Philadelphia Stars	15	3	0	.833	4–2	379	204	L1
Boston Breakers	11	7	0	.611	5–1	399	334	W1
New Jersey Generals	6	12	0	.333	2–4	314	437	L1
Washington Federals	4	14	0	.222	1–5	297	422	W2

== Awards ==
Award	Winner	Position
All-USFL Team	Herschel Walker	RB
USFL Outstanding Running Back	Herschel Walker	RB
USFL Rushing Yards Leader	Herschel Walker	RB
USFL Rushing Touchdown Leader	Herschel Walker	RB

== Final statistics ==
=== Offense ===
Generals Passing
	C/ATT	Yds	TD	INT
Bobby Scott	167/296	2174	7	16
Jeff Knapple	82/164	1017	3	10
Dave Boisture	16/35	160	1	2
Gene Bradley	7/19	81	1	1
Mike Friede	0/1	0	0	0
Generals Rushing
	Car	Yds	TD	LG
Herschel Walker	412	1812	17	83
Maurice Carthon	90	334	3	14
Dwight Sullivan	47	205	4	20
Walter Tullis	17	123	1	33
Thomas lott	18	110	1	16
Bobby Scott	19	71	0	14
Dave Boisture	7	45	0	11
Vickey Ray Anderson	5	29	0	9
Jeff Knapple	4	25	0	10
Larry Coffey	6	20	0	12
Mark Slawson	2	18	0	12
Sam Bowers	2	15	0	8
Lance Olander	3	11	0	6
Tom McConnaughey	1	1	0	1
Dave Jacobs	1	–5	0	–5
Victor Hicks	2	–11	0	–11
Generals Receiving
	Rec	Yds	TD	LG
Herschel Walker	53	489	1	65
Sam Bowers	43	719	1	49
Tom McConnaughey	42	691	3	37
Mike Friede	25	379	1	27
Victor Hicks	20	267	3	40
Maurice Carthon	20	170	0	22
Dwight Sullivan	20	99	0	11
Larry Brodsky	19	239	1	31
Mark Slawson	17	259	1	27
Larry Coffey	6	56	0	27
Vickey Ray Anderson	5	22	1	7
Walter Tullis	2	52	0	37

=== Defense ===
Generals Sacks
	Sacks
Mike Weddington	6.0
James Lockette	4.5
Terry Daniels	4.0
Rod Shoate	4.0
Tom Woodland	3.0
Ricky Williamson	2.5
Mike McKibben	2.0
Joe Cugliari	2.0
Richard Murray	1.0
Mel Lunsford	1.0
Scott Dawson	1.0
Maurice Clemmons	1.0
Donnie Harris	1.0
Sam Sopp	0.5
Rod Skillman	0.5
Steve Hammond	0.5

Generals Interceptions
	Int	Yds	TD	LG	PD
Mike Williams	8	68	0	26	
Terry Daniels	4	26	0	23	
Keith Moody	3	27	0	16	
Sam Sopp	3	22	0	15	
Rod Skillman	1	4	0	4	
Dana Noel	1	1	0	1	
Rod Shoate	2	50	0	31	

Generals Fumbles
	FF	Fmb	FR	Yds	TD
Herschel Walker		12	4	0	0
Thomas Lott		2	6	0	–1
Bobby Scott		7	3	0	0
Jeff Knapple		4	4	0	0
Maurice Carthon		4	0	0	0
Dwight Sullivan		3	2	0	0
Sam Bowers		3	1	0	0
Larry Coffy		2	2	0	0
Rod Skillman		1	1	0	0
William Holliday		1	1	0	0
Dave Boisture		1	0	0	0
Frank Naylor		1	0	0	0
Larry Brodsky		1	0	0	0
Victor Hicks		1	1	0	0
Walter Tullis		1	3	0	0

=== Special teams ===
Generals Kicking
	FGM–FGA	XPM–XPA
John Roveto	7-13	15-15

Generals Punting
	Pnt	Yds	Lng	Blck
Lance Olander	54	1998	57	0
Dave Jacobs	23	788	51	0

Generals Kick Returns
	Ret	Yds	TD	Lng
Thomas Lott	53	1160	0	37
Larry Coffy	6	113	0	39
Lance Olander	6	89	0	22
Dwight Sullivan	5	85	0	23
Herschel Walker	3	69	0	27
Mike Williams	2	49	0	30
Mike Weddington	4	41	0	14
Vickey Ray Anderson	1	19	0	19
Walter Tullis	1	7	0	7
Mike Friede	1	0	0	0

Generals Punt Returns
	Ret	Yds	TD	Lng
Thomas Lott	25	155	0	17
Mike Williams	5	58	0	18
