= 1977 All-South Independent football team =

American college football season

The 1977 All-South Independent football team consists of American football players chosen by the Associated Press for their All-South independent teams for the 1977 NCAA Division I football season.

== Offense ==
Quarterback

- Lloyd Patterson, Memphis (AP-1)
- Tom Rozantz, William and Mary (AP-2)

Running backs

- Larry Key, Florida State (AP-1)
- Ben Garry, Southern Mississippi (AP-1)
- Eddie Lee Ivery, Georgia Tech (AP-2)
- Calvin Prince, Louisville (AP-2)

Wide receivers

- Mike Shumann, Florida State (AP-1)
- Keith Wright, Memphis (AP-1)
- John Floyd, Louisiana-Monroe (AP-2)
- Terry Gallagher, East Carolina (AP-2)

Tight end

- Ernest Gray, Memphis (AP-1)
- Marc Mitchell, Louisville (AP-2)

Tackles

- Eric Smith, Southern Mississippi (AP-1)
- Eric Laakso, Tulane (AP-1)
- Jerome Provence, South Carolina (AP-2)
- Dudley Johnson, William and Mary (AP-2)

Guards

- Wade Johnson, Florida State (AP-1)
- Wayne Bolt, East Carolina (AP-1)
- Amos Fowler, Southern Mississippi (AP-2)
- Randy Pass, Georgia Tech (AP-2)

Center

- Hank Zimmerman, William and Mary (AP-1)
- Danny Clancey, South Carolina (AP-2)

== Defense ==
Defensive ends

- Willie Jones, Florida State (AP-1)
- Zachary Valentine, East Carolina (AP-1)
- Melvin Martin, William and Mary (AP-2)
- Bobby Smithhart, Southern Mississippi (AP-2)

Defensive tackles

- Stoney Parker, Southern Mississippi (AP-1)
- Don Smith, Miami (AP-1)
- Don Latimer, Miami (AP-1)
- Tom Abood, Louisville (AP-2)
- Mike Blanton, Georgia Tech (AP-2)
- Ron Simmons, Florida State (AP-2)

Linebackers

- Lucious Sanford, Georgia Tech (AP-1)
- Harold Randolph, East Carolina (AP-1)
- Rick Razzano, Virginia Tech (AP-1)
- Keith Butler, Memphis (AP-2)
- Otis Wilson, Louisville (AP-2)
- Mackel Harris, Georgia Tech (AP-2)

Defensive backs

- Jeff Nixon, Richmond (AP-1)
- Gerald Hall, East Carolina (AP-1)
- Nat Terry, Florida State (AP-1)
- Gene Bunn, Virginia Tech (AP-2)
- Bryan Ferguson, Miami (AP-2)

== Special teams ==
Kicker

- Ed Murray, Tulane (AP-1)
- Britt Parrish, South Carolina (AP-2)

Punter

- Max Runager, South Carolina (AP-1)
