= Ellis Rainsberger =

American football player (1932–2021)

Biographical details
- Born: October 20, 1932; St. Louis, Missouri, U.S.
- Died: July 17, 2021 (aged 88); Colorado Springs, Colorado, U.S.

Playing career
- 1955–1957: Kansas State
- 1958: Saskatchewan Roughriders
- Position: Offensive lineman

Coaching career (HC unless noted)
- 1959–1961: Drake (assistant)
- 1962–1964: Washburn
- 1965: Kansas (assistant)
- 1966: Southern Illinois
- 1967–1972: Illinois (assistant)
- 1973–1974: Wisconsin (OC)
- 1975–1977: Kansas State
- 1978–1982: Winnipeg Blue Bombers (assistant)
- 1983: Denver Gold (assistant)
- 1984: Pittsburgh Maulers
- 1986–1988: Toronto Argonauts (OL)
- 1989–1991: Toledo (assistant)

Administrative career (AD unless noted)
- 2000–2004: Tennessee Titans (scout)
- 2005–2007: Miami Dolphins (scout)

Head coaching record
- Overall: 27–42–1 (college); 1–7 (USFL)

Accomplishments and honors

Championships
- 1 CIAC (1964)

Awards
- First-team All-Big Seven (1956)

Ellis Dwight Rainsberger Sr. (October 20, 1932 – July 17, 2021) was an American gridiron football player, coach, and scout. He served as the head football coach at Washburn University (1962–1964), Southern Illinois University Carbondale (1966), and Kansas State University (1975–1977), compiling a career college football record of 27–42–1. Rainsberger was the head coach of the USFL's Pittsburgh Maulers for part of the 1984 season, tallying a mark of 1–7. He was most recently a scout with the Tennessee Titans (2000–2004) and Miami Dolphins (2005–2007) of the National Football League (NFL).

== Playing career ==
Rainsberger was a three-year football letterman at Kansas State University in the 1950s, as well as a two-time All-Big Eight Conference selection. He was also a letterman for the Kansas State wrestling team.

== Coaching career ==
Rainsberger served as the head football coach at NAIA-level Washburn University from 1962 to 1964, posting a record of 17–10 and winning a conference championship in 1964. His record at Washburn ranks him ninth in terms of total wins and tenth in terms of winning percentage. He became the 11th head football coach at Southern Illinois University Carbondale for one season in 1966, tallying a record of 4–5–1. Rainsberger returned to his alma mater to serve as head football coach at Kansas State from 1975 to 1977. He started his tenure there while, winning his first three games, but ultimately compiled a record of 6–27. Rainsberger left Kansas State with the program placed on probation for giving too many scholarships.

Following his termination at Kansas State, Rainsberger served as offensive coordinator for the Winnipeg Blue Bombers of the Canadian Football League (CFL) from 1978 to 1982. He spent the 1983 season as an assistant coach with the Denver Gold of the United States Football League (USFL). In 1984, he was interim head coach of the Pittsburgh Maulers for the second half of the season. The head coach he replaced, Joe Pendry, had been Rainsberger's offensive coordinator at Kansas State. During his long career, Rainsberger has also held a number of assistant coaching positions in the college ranks. He worked as an assistant coach at the Drake University (1959–1961), the University of Kansas (1965), the University of Illinois (1967–1972), the University of Wisconsin–Madison (1973–1974), and the University of Toledo (1989–1991).

== Head coaching record ==
Year	Team	Overall	Conference	Standing
Washburn Ichabods (Central Intercollegiate Conference) (1962–1964)
1962	Washburn	4–5	2–3	T–4th
1963	Washburn	5–4	2–2	3rd
1964	Washburn	8–1	4–0	1st
Washburn:		17–10	8–5	
Southern Illinois Salukis (NCAA College Division independent) (1966)
1966	Southern Illinois	4–5–1		
Southern Illinois:		4–5–1		
Kansas State Wildcats (Big Eight Conference) (1975–1977)
1975	Kansas State	3–8	0–7	8th
1976	Kansas State	1-10	0–7	8th
1977	Kansas State	2–9	0–7	8th
Kansas State:		6–27	0–21	
Total:		27–42–1		
National championship Conference title Conference division title or championship game berth
