= Bryan Millard =

American football player (born 1960)

No. 76, 71
- Positions: Guard, Tackle

Personal information
- Born: December 2, 1960 (age 65); Sioux City, Iowa, U.S.
- Listed height: 6 ft 5 in (1.96 m)
- Listed weight: 282 lb (128 kg)

Career information
- High school: Dumas (TX)
- College: Texas

Career history
- 1983–1984: New Jersey Generals (USFL)
- 1984–1992: Seattle Seahawks

Awards and highlights
- First-team All-SWC (1982); Seattle Seahawks 35th Anniversary team; Seattle Seahawks Top 50 players
- Stats at Pro Football Reference

Bryan James Millard (born December 2, 1960) is an American former professional football player who was an offensive lineman in the United States Football League (USFL) and National Football League (NFL). He played college football for the Texas Longhorns. He began his pro career with the USFL's New Jersey Generals. From 1984 until 1991, Millard played primarily at offensive guard for the NFL's Seattle Seahawks.

== Career ==
Millard started in 1981 and 1982 for UT-Austin, helping the Longhorns compile two consecutive second-place finishes in the Southwest Conference. In 1981, Millard's team won the Cotton Bowl Classic and received a #2 national ranking in the final AP Poll. His 1982 team lost the Sun Bowl and ranked #17 in the final AP Poll, but Millard won recognition as a first-team all-conference tackle.

Millard went undrafted by the NFL in 1983, but the New Jersey Generals of the USFL drafted him in the 12th round. As a rookie, Millard helped Herschel Walker run for 1,812 yards, though a knee injury sidelined Millard in midseason. In 1984, Millard's blocking helped Walker compile 1,339 rushing yards, while fullback Maurice Carthon also gained more than a thousand yards on the ground. The Generals made the playoffs that year, but after the USFL's spring season ended, Millard left the team and joined the Seahawks in the NFL that fall.

After riding the pine in 1984, Millard started 9 games at left tackle in 1985. In 1986, the Seahawks moved him to right guard, where he started until his retirement after the 1991 season. Millard's blocking helped make the Seahawks an offensive powerhouse, featuring the Pro Bowl talents of quarterback Dave Krieg, wide receiver Steve Largent, tailback Curt Warner and fullback John L. Williams. NFL scouts at the time considered him one of the most underrated offensive linemen in the game, but Millard won individual recognition as a second-team all-conference guard in the 1988 United Press International poll. As the starting right guard, he helped the Seahawks post winning records in 1986, 1987, 1988 and 1990, and to make the playoffs in 1987 and 1988. He is also the player to give Dave Krieg his nickname, Mudbone.

Injuries forced Millard to retire after the 1991 season. Since retiring from football, he has worked as a pharmaceutical salesman and now owns a chain of gas stations in Austin, Texas. In 1997, an NFL.com poll named him the greatest offensive lineman in Seahawks history.
