= Udinski =

Udinski is a surname. Notable people with the surname include:

- Mark Udinski (born 1960), American football player
- Reece Udinski (born 1998), American football player
