= Jerry Holmes =

American football player and coach (born 1957)

No. 43, 44, 47, 37
- Position: Cornerback

Personal information
- Born: December 22, 1957 (age 68); Newport News, Virginia, U.S.
- Listed height: 6 ft 2 in (1.88 m)
- Listed weight: 175 lb (79 kg)

Career information
- High school: Bethel (VA)
- College: West Virginia
- NFL draft: 1980: undrafted

Career history

Playing
- New York Jets (1980–1983); Pittsburgh Maulers (1984); New Jersey Generals (1985); New York Jets (1986–1987); Detroit Lions (1988–1989); Green Bay Packers (1990–1991)

Coaching
- Cleveland Browns (1999–2000) Defensive backs coach; Washington Redskins (2001) Defensive backs coach; San Diego Chargers (2002–2003) Defensive backs coach; Hampton (2004) Linebackers coach; Hampton (2005–2007) Defensive coordinator/linebackers coach; Hampton (2008) Head coach; Hartford Colonials (2010) Secondary coach; Morgan State (2013) Defensive coordinator/linebackers coach

Awards and highlights
- Second-team All-East (1979)

Career NFL statistics
- Interceptions: 25
- Fumble recoveries: 6
- Sacks: 2
- Stats at Pro Football Reference

Jerry Lee Holmes (born December 22, 1957) is an American football coach and former cornerback. He played ten seasons in the National Football League (NFL), mainly for New York Jets but also with the Detroit Lions and Green Bay Packers. He also played in the United States Football League (USFL) for the New Jersey Generals and the Pittsburgh Maulers. Holmes attended West Virginia University.

== College career ==
Holmes began his collegiate career at Chowan Junior College before transferring to West Virginia University. He lettered for two years at West Virginia. Holmes was a standout defensive back for two seasons on WVU’s 1978 and 1979 football teams after coming to Morgantown from Chowan Junior College in North Carolina.

Holmes earned All-East and totaled 175 career tackles in his two-year Mountaineer career and was a captain his senior season. Despite a limited time in the Mountaineer uniform, Holmes still was named a member of WVU’s all-1970s team and earned the award for the team’s most valuable player in 1979.

== Professional career ==
=== New York Jets ===
Holmes made the New York Jets roster in 1980 as a rookie free agent. While primarily a backup his rookie season, he became a starter by early 1981 on a vastly improved Jets defense that helped lead the team to its first playoff berth in 12 years. Holmes intercepted a Joe Ferguson pass in a 31–27 AFC Wild Card playoff loss to the Buffalo Bills.

Holmes notched 3 interceptions during the 1982 regular season and recovered a fumble by Los Angeles Raiders WR Cliff Branch in a playoff game, quashing a potential late first half field goal in a game ultimately won by the Jets 17-14.

On September 2, 1983, Holmes signed a future contract with the Pittsburgh Maulers of the USFL to begin in 1984. The contract reportedly tripled his salary and earned him a signing bonus, in addition to being personally guaranteed by Maulers owner Edward J. DeBartolo Sr. in case of injury during his remaining Jets time. Despite his lame duck status, Holmes had several big plays during the season that keyed Jets wins. In week 4, Holmes returned a blocked field goal 57 yards against the Rams for his first career touchdown in a 27-24 OT victory. In week 9, he picked off a Joe Montana pass late in the game and returned it 43 yards for a touchdown to clinch and upset victory at San Francisco.

=== USFL - Pittsburgh Maulers/New Jersey Generals ===
Holmes started all 18 games for the expansion Maulers in 1984 and had two interceptions. The Maulers franchise folded and Holmes' contract was assigned to the New Jersey Generals for the 1985 season, for which he started and contributed three interceptions.

=== New York Jets ===
After the USFL announced it was suspending its fall 1986 season on August 4, 1986, Holmes re-signed with the Jets late in training camp. He led the team with 6 interceptions (finishing 5th in the AFC) in the regular season and added one more in a Divisional playoff loss at Cleveland. Holmes was released by the Jets during 1988 training camp and signed with the Detroit Lions.

=== Detroit Lions ===
Homes started for the Lions in 1988-89 and swiped 7 total interceptions, including 6 in 1989 which tied him for third in the NFC. He scored his last career touchdown on November 12, 1989, against the Green Bay Packers.

=== Green Bay Packers ===
Holmes finished his career as a starter for the Packers in 1990-91, totaling four more interceptions for a career NFL total of 25 (and a professional total of 30). He announced his retirement during 1992 training camp.

== Coaching career ==
Jerry Holmes enters his first season as head coach at Hampton University. Prior to becoming head coach Holmes spent the last third season as defensive coordinator and linebackers coach here at Hampton (2004–07). Holmes’ also spent five years coaching defensive backs for the San Diego Chargers (2002–03), the Washington Redskins (2001) and the Cleveland Browns (1999-00).

As a coach, Holmes embodies the same characteristics that he demonstrated as a player in the NFL and the USFL, physical play and aggressive football. His coaching prowess has transferred successfully to his players on the field everywhere that he has been. In 2001 his Redskins secondary boasted the NFL’s sixth leading defense against the pass. The team’s 23 interceptions were the fifth most in the league. During Holmes’ tenure with the Browns, Cleveland ranked 11th and 12th in the league against the pass.

Holmes began his coaching career as the linebackers coach and co-defensive coordinator at Hampton University from 1992 to 1994. During those three seasons with the Pirates, Hampton posted a remarkable record of 31-4-1, winning three consecutive CIAA championships, making two trips to the NCAA playoffs and capturing the 1994 Black College National Championship. After leaving Hampton, Holmes spent the next four seasons (1994–98) as the defensive backs coach at his alma mater West Virginia University. In 1996 the Mountaineers featured the nation’s top-ranked defense that included a No. 5 national ranking against the pass. He has also completed coaching internships with the Detroit Lions, the Jacksonville Jaguars and Boston University.

Since his return to Hampton Holmes has continued his previous success by guiding linebacker Justin Durant to three consecutive MEAC Defensive Player of the Year honors, while also helping the Pirate defense lead the country in turnovers forced with 43 in 2004. During the 2005 campaign his unit finished the year ranking second in the Division I FCS in points allowed at 14 points per game, while also ranking sixth in total defense. Last season the Pirates continued to display their dominance on the defensive side of the ball surrendering just 14.5 points per game, ranking third in pass defense and second in tackles for loss.

== Head coaching record ==
Year	Team	Overall	Conference	Standing	Bowl/playoffs
Hampton Pirates (Mid-Eastern Athletic Conference) (2008)
2008	Hampton	6–5	5–3	T–2nd	
Hampton:		6–5	5–3		
Total:		6–5			
