= List of Delaware State Hornets in the NFL draft =

This is a list of Delaware State Hornets football players in the NFL draft.

== Key ==
B	Back	K	Kicker	NT	Nose tackle
C	Center	LB	Linebacker	FB	Fullback
DB	Defensive back	P	Punter	HB	Halfback
DE	Defensive end	QB	Quarterback	WR	Wide receiver
DT	Defensive tackle	RB	Running back	G	Guard
E	End	T	Offensive tackle	TE	Tight end

== Selections ==
Year	Round	Pick	Player	Team	Position
1971	3	60	Steve Davis	Pittsburgh Steelers	RB
1976	12	337	Walter Tullis	Washington Redskins	DB
1983	6	143	Victor Heflin	Denver Broncos	DB
1986	3	76	John Taylor	San Francisco 49ers	WR
1988	7	191	Kevin Bryant	San Francisco 49ers	LB
1989	5	139	Lybrant Robinson	Washington Redskins	DE
1991	7	177	David Jones	San Diego Chargers	WR
1992	5	121	Rod Milstead	Dallas Cowboys	G
2001	5	154	Darnerien McCants	Washington Redskins	WR
2015	4	116	Rodney Gunter	Arizona Cardinals	DT
