= Dwight Sullivan =

American football player (born 1959)

No. 46
- Position: Fullback

Personal information
- Born: April 24, 1959 (age 67); Hattiesburg, Mississippi, U.S.
- Listed height: 5 ft 10 in (1.78 m)
- Listed weight: 210 lb (95 kg)

Career information
- High school: Hillside (NC)
- College: NC State
- NFL draft: 1982: 8th round, 221st overall pick

Career history
- Dallas Cowboys (1982)*; New Jersey Generals (1983); Los Angeles Express (1984)*; New Jersey Generals (1984)
- * Offseason or practice squad member only

Dwight Dewitt Sullivan (born April 24, 1959) is an American former football fullback in the United States Football League (USFL) for the New Jersey Generals. He played college football at North Carolina State University.

== Early life ==
Sullivan attended Hillside High School, where he practiced football and track & field. He accepted a football scholarship from North Carolina State University, where he played as a running back and fullback.

As a junior in 1979, he helped the Wolfpack win the ACC football championship, leading the team with 150 carries for 665 rushing yards (4.4-yard avg.) and 6 rushing touchdowns, starting in the team's twin-veer offense. He had 131 rushing yards against East Carolina University and 119 rushing yards against Duke University.

In 1980, he missed most of the season (only played in 2 games) with an ankle injury and was redshirted.

As a fifth-year senior in 1981, the team changed to an I formation offense and he was mostly used as a blocker for freshman standout Joe McIntosh, who led the ACC with 1,190 rushing yards. He was third on the team with 56 carries for 334 rushing yards (6.0-yard avg.) and 2 rushing touchdowns.

He finished his college career with 238 carries for 1,123 rushing yards (4.7-yard avg.), 9 rushing touchdowns and 15 receptions for 73 yards. He also practiced track & field.

== Professional career ==
=== Dallas Cowboys ===
Sullivan was selected by the Dallas Cowboys in the eighth round (221st overall) of the 1982 NFL draft. He was limited with a heel and hand bruise. He was waived on September 6.

=== New Jersey Generals (USFL) ===
In 1983, he was signed as a free agent by the New Jersey Generals of the United States Football League. He was the starter at fullback in the season opener, before falling on the depth chart behind Maurice Carthon in the fourth game. He posted 47 carries for 205 rushing yards, 4 rushing touchdowns and 20 receptions for 99 yards.

On December 27, he was traded along with linebacker Steve Hammond to the Los Angeles Express in exchange for Brian Sipe. On January 23, 1984, he was cut by the Express.

In January 1984, he signed with the Generals. He was released on February 21. He was later re-signed on February 23. He was limited with ankle and knee injuries, only playing in 8 games and his production dropped to 8 carries for 81 yards and one rushing touchdown.
