= Jeff Knapple =

German gridiron football player (born 1956)

No. 8, 12, 16
- Position: Quarterback

Personal information
- Born: August 27, 1956 (age 70); Würzburg, Germany
- Listed height: 6 ft 2 in (1.88 m)
- Listed weight: 200 lb (91 kg)

Career information
- High school: Fairview (Boulder, Colorado)
- College: UCLA; Colorado; Northern Colorado
- NFL draft: 1979: undrafted

Career history
- Buffalo Bills (1979)*; Denver Broncos (1980); Calgary Stampeders (1981); Denver Gold (1983); New Jersey Generals (1983-1984)
- * Offseason or practice squad member only

Awards and highlights
- Second-team All-Big Eight (1977)
- Stats at Pro Football Reference

Jeffrey Scott Knapple (born August 27, 1956) is a former American football quarterback in the National Football League (NFL) who played for the Denver Broncos. He played college football for the UCLA Bruins, Colorado Buffaloes, and Northern Colorado Bears. He also played in the Canadian Football League (CFL) for the Calgary Stampeders and in the USFL for the Denver Gold and New Jersey Generals.

After his football career, Knapple transitioned into business, and was instrumental in the broad adaptation of naming rights in professional sports venues. Knapple was responsible for deals including Staples Center (Los Angeles Lakers, Los Angeles Clippers, Los Angeles Kings), Citizen's Bank Park (Philadelphia Phillies), Emirates Stadium (Arsenal), MetLife Stadium (New York Giants, New York Jets), U.S. Bank Stadium (Minnesota Vikings), and Philips Arena (Atlanta Hawks). He is currently a senior executive at Elevate Sports Ventures.

Knapple was married to Tammera Wells in the 1970s. After Jeff's divorce from Tammera, Jeff married Lola Scarpitta in 1983 and had two sons, Ben Knapple in 1984 and Spencer Knapple in 1988. The couple divorced in 2016. Knapple married actress Jill Whelan in 2017.
