= Ben Garry =

American football player (1956–2006)

No. 29
- Position: Running back

Personal information
- Born: February 11, 1956; Hazlehurst, Mississippi, U.S.
- Died: June 24, 2006 (aged 50); Mobile, Alabama, U.S.
- Listed height: 6 ft 0 in (1.83 m)
- Listed weight: 215 lb (98 kg)

Career information
- College: Southern Mississippi (1974–1977)
- NFL draft: 1978: 6th round, 161st overall pick

Career history
- Baltimore Colts (1979–1980); Buffalo Bills (1981)*
- * Offseason or practice squad member only

Awards and highlights
- First-team All-South Independent (1977)

Career NFL statistics
- Rushing yards: 41
- Rushing average: 3.2
- Receptions: 4
- Receiving yards: 18
- Stats at Pro Football Reference

Benjamin Earl Garry (February 11, 1956 – June 24, 2006) was an American professional football running back who played two seasons with the Baltimore Colts of the National Football League (NFL). He was selected by the Colts in the sixth round of the 1978 NFL draft. He played college football at the University of Southern Mississippi.

== Early life ==
Benjamin Earl Garry was born on February 11, 1956, in Hazlehurst, Mississippi. He attended Pascagoula High School in Pascagoula, Mississippi.

== College career ==
Garry was a four-year letterman for the Southern Mississippi Golden Eagles of the University of Southern Mississippi from 1974 to 1977. He rushed 90 times for 379 yards and three touchdowns his freshman year in 1974. In 1975, he recorded 178 carries for 846 yards and nine touchdowns, and nine catches for 47 yards and one touchdown. He totaled 236 rushing attempts for 1,236 yards and eight touchdowns in 1976 while also catching for 15 passes for 126 yards. As a senior in 1977, Garry rushed 219 times for 1,134 yards and ten touchdowns, earning honorable mention All-American and Associated Press first-team All-South Independent honors. His 3,595 career rushing yards set a school record. He played in the Senior Bowl after his senior season. Garry was inducted into Southern Miss' M-Club Sports Hall of Fame in 1998.

== Professional career ==
Garry was selected by the Baltimore Colts in the sixth round, with the 161st overall pick, of the 1978 NFL draft. He did not sign with the team until December 20, 1978. He played in 11 games for the Colts in 1979, totaling 13 carries for 41 yards, three receptions for nine yards, and eight kick returns for 135 yards. Garry appeared in three games for the Colts during the 1980 season, recording one catch for nine yards, three kick returns for 55 yards, one fumble, and one fumble recovery. He was placed on injured reserve on October 9, 1980. He was released by the Colts on July 13, 1981.

Garry signed with the Buffalo Bills on July 17, 1981, but was later released.

== Death ==
Garry died in a car accident on June 24, 2006, in Mobile, Alabama. He posthumously received the Bill Wade Unsung Hero Award at the All-American Football Foundation's 79th Banquet of Champions in August 2006.
