= Mike Friede =

American football player (born 1957)

No. 86, 88
- Position: Wide receiver

Personal information
- Born: September 22, 1957 (age 69); Havre, Montana, U.S.
- Listed height: 6 ft 3 in (1.91 m)
- Listed weight: 205 lb (93 kg)

Career information
- High school: Goodland (Goodland, Kansas)
- College: Garden City CC (1976–1977); Indiana (1978–1979)
- NFL draft: 1980: 3rd round, 62nd overall pick

Career history
- Detroit Lions (1980); New York Giants (1980–1981); New Jersey Generals (1983)

Career NFL statistics
- Receptions: 40
- Receiving yards: 621
- Receiving touchdowns: 1
- Stats at Pro Football Reference

Michael Gordon Friede (/ˈfriːdiː/ FREE-dee; born September 22, 1957) is an American former professional football player who was a wide receiver for two seasons in the National Football League (NFL) with the Detroit Lions and New York Giants.

== Early life and college ==
Michael Gordon Friede was born on September 22, 1957, in Havre, Montana. He attended Goodland High School in Goodland, Kansas.

Friede first played college football at Garden City Community College from 1976 to 1977. He was then a two-year letterman for the Indiana Hoosiers of the Indiana University Bloomington from 1978 to 1979. He caught 17 passes for 412 yards and three touchdowns in 1978 while also rushing four times for six yards and one touchdown and returning three punts for 194 yards. As a senior in 1979, he totaled 17 receptions for 303 yards and one touchdown, and one punt return for 45 yards.

== Professional career ==
Friede was selected by the Detroit Lions in the third round, with the 62nd overall pick, of the 1980 NFL draft. He officially signed with the team on July 1, 1980. He played in four games for the Lions during the 1980 season, catching one pass for 21 yards, before being released on October 3, 1980.

Friede signed with the New York Giants on October 15, 1980. He appeared in seven games, starting four, for the Giants in 1980, recording 21 receptions for 350 yards. He was placed on injured reserve on December 1, 1980. Friede played in all 16 games, starting 15, in 1981 and caught 18 passes for 250 yards and one touchdown. He appeared in two playoff games that year as well. He was released by the Giants on September 6, 1982.

Frieded was signed by the New Jersey Generals of the United States Football League (USFL) on January 19, 1983. He played in all 18 games, starting 11, for the Generals during the 1983 season, recording 25 receptions for 379 yards and one touchdown. He was released on February 21, 1984.
