= Earnest Adams =

American football player (born 1959)

No. 50
- Positions: Linebacker, lineman

Personal information
- Born: March 12, 1959 (age 67); Fort Lauderdale, Florida, U.S.
- Listed height: 6 ft 3 in (1.91 m)
- Listed weight: 226 lb (103 kg)

Career information
- College: Illinois
- NFL draft: 1981: undrafted

Career history
- Philadelphia Eagles (1981)*; Pittsburgh Maulers (1984); Portland Breakers (1985); Pittsburgh Gladiators (1987–1988); Detroit Lions (1987)
- * Offseason or practice squad member only
- Stats at Pro Football Reference

Earnest Adams (born March 12, 1959) is an American former professional football linebacker who primarily played in the United States Football League (USFL) for the Pittsburgh Maulers and Portland Breakers, but was also a replacement player during the 1987 NFL strike for the Detroit Lions of the National Football League (NFL), and played for the Pittsburgh Gladiators of the Arena Football League (AFL). He played college football for the Illinois Fighting Illini.

== College career ==
Adams played for the Fighting Illini at the University of Illinois Urbana-Champaign from 1977 to 1980.

== Professional career ==
=== Pittsburgh Maulers ===
Adams signed with the Pittsburgh Maulers of the United States Football League in the spring of 1984, and played in 18 games with 11 starts at middle linebacker that season.

=== Portland Breakers ===
Following the dissolution of the Maulers, Adams signed with another USFL team, the Portland Breakers. He made two sacks that season, for a total loss of seven yards.

=== Pittsburgh Gladiators (1987) ===
In the summer of 1987, Adams joined the Pittsburgh Gladiators of the newly-created Arena Football League, an indoor form of football played on a smaller field. He played on both offensive and defensive lines.

=== Detroit Lions ===
During the 1987 NFL season, a majority of the players went on strike, resulting in the cancellation of Week 3 games, and for Weeks 4–6 to be played with replacement players. Adams was signed by the Detroit Lions to be one of such replacement players, and he appeared in all three replacement games.

=== Pittsburgh Gladiators (1988) ===
Following his brief NFL appearance, Adams came back to arena football in the summer of 1988 to play again with the Gladiators. In his second season, he was used as a receiver as well, and caught three touchdowns.
