= Sam Clancy =

American football player (born 1958)

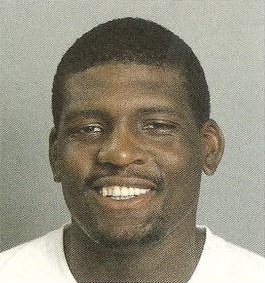

No. 84, 77, 90, 91, 76
- Position: Defensive end

Personal information
- Born: May 29, 1958 (age 68); Pittsburgh, Pennsylvania, U.S.
- Listed height: 6 ft 7 in (2.01 m)
- Listed weight: 288 lb (131 kg)

Career information
- High school: Brashear (Pittsburgh, Pennsylvania)
- College: Pittsburgh
- NFL draft: 1982: 11th round, 284th overall pick

Career history
- Seattle Seahawks (1982–1983); Pittsburgh Maulers (1984); Memphis Showboats (1985); Cleveland Browns (1985–1988); Indianapolis Colts (1989–1993)

Career NFL statistics
- Sacks: 30
- Fumble recoveries: 7
- Stats at Pro Football Reference

Medal record

Men's basketball

Representing United States

Pan American Games
Gold medal – first place	1979 San Juan	Team competition

Sam Clancy (born May 29, 1958) is a former defensive end in the National Football League (NFL). He played for the Seattle Seahawks, Cleveland Browns, and Indianapolis Colts. He also played for the Pittsburgh Maulers and the Memphis Showboats of the United States Football League (USFL).

Prior to his professional football career, he was a standout college basketball player for the University of Pittsburgh and member of the gold-medal-winning 1979 U.S. Pan American Games Men's Basketball team; he played a season in the Continental Basketball Association for the Billings Volcanos in 1981–82, averaging 11.5 points and 8.3 rebounds per game. He did not play football in college.

He has been an assistant coach for the Barcelona Dragons of NFL Europe, as well as the New Orleans Saints and Oakland Raiders.

== Personal life ==
He has 3 sons, Sam Clancy Jr., who is a professional basketball player, Samario Clancy, who was a collegiate basketball player and works in basketball analytics at the professional level, Samarcus Hollinsworth, a daughter, Samantha Clancy, and stepson, Evann Farren.
