= Mickey Barilla =

American football player (born 1958)

No. 5
- Position: Placekicker

Personal information
- Born: March 27, 1958 (age 68); Steubenville, Ohio, U.S.
- Listed height: 6 ft 0 in (1.83 m)
- Listed weight: 200 lb (91 kg)

Career information
- High school: Western (Las Vegas, Nevada)
- College: UNLV, Snow Junior College, Colorado State

Career history
- Buffalo Bills (1980)*; New York Jets (1981)*; Oakland Invaders (1984)*; Pittsburgh Maulers (1984)
- * Offseason or practice squad member only

Michael Joseph "Mickey" Barilla (born March 27, 1958) is an American former football placekicker who played one season for the Pittsburgh Maulers of the United States Football League (USFL). Barilla also spent time with the New York Jets and Buffalo Bills of the National Football League (NFL), and Oakland Invaders of the USFL, but did not make any appearances. With the Pittsburgh Maulers, he played one game.

== Early life and education ==
Mickey Barilla was born on March 27, 1958, in Steubenville, Ohio. He went to Western High School in Las Vegas, Nevada, before attending three colleges. He attended UNLV, Snow Junior College, and Colorado State University. He played kicker with their teams, the UNLV Rebels, Snow Badgers, and Colorado State Rams. He spent 1976 with UNLV, 1977 with Snow Junior College, and 1978 to 1979 with Colorado State University. He lettered with Colorado State. In 1978, Barilla made 13 of 21 field goal attempts, and 21 of 23 extra points while playing in 11 games. In the Western Athletic Conference (WAC), Barilla was 7th for points scored, 5th for extra point attempts, 6th for extra points made, 3rd for field goal attempts, 4th for field goals made, and 4th for field goal percentage (61.9). He also set the Colorado State single game record for field goals and points by kicking. In his senior year, he made 13 of 19 field goal attempts, and 18 of 19 extra point attempts while playing in 12 games. In the WAC conference, he ranked: 10th in points scored, 6th in extra point attempts, 6th in extra points made, 1st in field goal attempts, 1st in field goals made, and 1st in field goal percentage (68.4). He tried to return for a 5th year but was deemed ineligible to play.

== Professional career ==
In 1980, Barilla was signed by the Buffalo Bills of the National Football League (NFL). However, he was released before the season started. He was signed the next year by the New York Jets but did not play. After being released by New York, he worked as a car salesman. In 1984, he was signed by the Oakland Invaders of the United States Football League (USFL), only to be traded shortly afterwards. He was traded to the Pittsburgh Maulers, where he would beat out rival kicker Dave Jacobs for the starting job. Barilla then played in the first game of the season against the Oklahoma Outlaws, making one of two field goal attempts. However, the Maulers' general manager wasn't pleased with his performance and released him after only playing in one game.
