= Mike McKibben =

American football player (born 1956)

No. 53
- Position: Linebacker

Personal information
- Born: September 3, 1956 (age 70); Mount Carmel, Illinois, U.S.
- Listed height: 6 ft 3 in (1.91 m)
- Listed weight: 228 lb (103 kg)

Career information
- High school: Weston (WV) Lewis County
- College: Kent State
- NFL draft: 1979: undrafted

Career history
- New York Jets (1979–1980); New Jersey Generals (1983); Pittsburgh Maulers (1984); Denver Gold (1985)

Career NFL statistics
- Interceptions: 1
- Stats at Pro Football Reference

Mike McKibben (born September 3, 1956) is an American former professional football player who was a linebacker for the New York Jets of the National Football League (NFL) from 1979 to 1980. He played college football for the Kent State Golden Flashes.
