= Vickey Ray Anderson =

American gridiron football player (born 1956)

No. 35, 44
- Position: Running back

Personal information
- Born: May 3, 1956 (age 70); Oklahoma City, Oklahoma, U.S.
- Listed height: 6 ft 0 in (1.83 m)
- Listed weight: 205 lb (93 kg)

Career information
- High school: Oklahoma City (OK) Classen
- College: Oklahoma
- NFL draft: 1979: undrafted

Career history
- New Orleans Saints (1979)*; Saskatchewan Roughriders (1979); Green Bay Packers (1980); New Jersey Generals (1983)
- * Offseason or practice squad member only

Awards and highlights
- 2× National champion (1974, 1975)

Career NFL statistics
- Rushing yards: 5
- Rushing average: 1.3
- Receptions: 2
- Receiving yards: 2
- Stats at Pro Football Reference

Vickey Ray Anderson is a former running back in the National Football League (NFL), Canadian Football League (CFL) and United States Football League (USFL).

== Early life ==
Anderson was born on May 3, 1956, in Oklahoma City, Oklahoma.

== Professional career ==
Anderson played for the Green Bay Packers during the 1980 NFL season. He played at the collegiate level at the University of Oklahoma. While there, he had played as a cornerback.
