= Victor Hicks =

American football player (born 1957)

No. 81, 87
- Position: Tight end

Personal information
- Born: January 19, 1957 (age 69); Lubbock, Texas, U.S.
- Listed height: 6 ft 3 in (1.91 m)
- Listed weight: 250 lb (113 kg)

Career information
- High school: Estacado (Lubbock)
- College: Oklahoma (1975–1978)
- NFL draft: 1979: 5th round, 122nd overall pick

Career history
- Los Angeles Rams (1979–1981); Los Angeles Raiders (1982)*; New Jersey Generals (1983); Denver Gold (1984); Jacksonville Bulls (1985)*
- * Offseason or practice squad member only

Awards and highlights
- National champion (1975)

Career NFL statistics
- Receptions: 23
- Receiving yards: 318
- Receiving touchdowns: 3
- Stats at Pro Football Reference

Victor Lonell Hicks (born January 19, 1957) is an American former professional football player who was a tight end for one season with the Los Angeles Rams of the National Football League (NFL). He was selected by the Rams in the fifth round of the 1979 NFL draft after played college football for the Oklahoma Sooners. He also played for the New Jersey Generals and Denver Gold of the United States Football League (USFL).

== Early life ==
Victor Lonell Hicks was born on January 19, 1957, in Lubbock, Texas. He attended Estacado High School in Lubbock, where he was a letterman in football, basketball, and track. He played football at Estacado High from 1971 to 1974. He was elevated to varsity in 1972 and was named team MVP that year. Hicks caught 19 passes for 381 yards and four touchdowns in 1973, earning All-District, All-City, and All-South Plains honors. He was injured for the majority of his senior year in 1974, rushing 36 times for 146 yards as a halfback. He was inducted into the Lubbock Independent School District Hall of Honor in 2024.

== College career ==
Hicks was a four-year letterman for the Oklahoma Sooners of the University of Oklahoma from 1975 to 1978. He caught two passes for 54 yards and one touchdown his freshman year in 1975 as the Sooners were named consensus national champions. He caught three passes for 45 yards and one touchdown in 1976, and five passes for 120 yards and three touchdowns in 1977. Despite only catching five passes, his three receiving touchdowns were tied for the most in the Big Eight Conference that year with four other players. As a senior in 1978, Hicks recorded five receptions for 93 yards and three touchdowns.

== Professional career ==
Hicks was selected by the Los Angeles Rams in the fifth round, with the 122nd overall pick, of the 1979 NFL draft. He was placed on injured reserve on August 15, 1979, and missed the entire season. He played in all 16 games, starting 14, for the Rams during the 1980 season, catching 23 passes for 318 yards and three touchdowns. Hicks also started one playoff game that year. He was placed on injured reserve again the next year on August 25, 1981, before being released on October 16, 1981.

Hicks signed with the Los Angeles Raiders on July 10, 1982. He was released on August 30, 1982.

On November 8, 1982, Hall signed with the New Jersey Generals of the United States Football League (USFL) for the 1983 season. He played in 17 games, starting nine, for the Generals in 1983, catching 20 passes for 267 yards and three touchdowns.

On February 3, 1984, Hicks and Thomas Lott were traded to the Denver Gold for Andy Poremba, Kyle Whittingham, and the rights to Jesse Jackson and Steve Doolittle. Hicks appeared in 16 games, starting nine, for the Gold during the 1984 season, totaling 31 receptions for 438 yards. He was released by the Gold on October 25, 1984.

Hicks was signed by the Jacksonville Bulls of the USFL on November 1, 1984. However, he was later released.
