= Walter Tullis =

American football player (born 1953)

No. 20, 87, 84
- Position: Wide receiver

Personal information
- Born: April 12, 1953 (age 73); Americus, Georgia, U.S.
- Listed height: 6 ft 0 in (1.83 m)
- Listed weight: 170 lb (77 kg)

Career information
- High school: Weaver (Hartford, Connecticut)
- College: Delaware State (1971–1975)
- NFL draft: 1976: 12th round, 342nd overall pick

Career history

Playing
- Washington Redskins (1976)*; New York Giants (1977)*; Green Bay Packers (1978–1980); New Jersey Generals (1983); Pittsburgh Maulers (1984)*
- * Offseason or practice squad member only

Coaching
- Delaware State (1981–1982) Wide receivers coach / women's track coach; Alabama A&M (1984–c.1994) Wide receivers coach / track coach; Savannah State (c.1997); Weaver High School (c.1999) Track coach

Career NFL statistics
- Receptions: 10
- Receiving yards: 173
- Touchdowns: 1
- Stats at Pro Football Reference

Walter Henry Tullis (born April 12, 1953) is an American former professional football player who was a wide receiver for two seasons in the National Football League (NFL) and one in the United States Football League (USFL). He played college football for the Delaware State Hornets and was selected in the 12th round of the 1976 NFL draft by the Washington Redskins. He later was a member of the New York Giants, Green Bay Packers, New Jersey Generals and Pittsburgh Maulers.

== Early life and education ==
Tullis was born on April 12, 1953, in Americus, Georgia. He attended Weaver High School in Hartford, Connecticut, and was their third alumni to play in the NFL. He was an all-city and all-state selection at Weaver while playing running back, but was recruited as a track and field athlete.

Tullis accepted a half-scholarship to play track and field for the Delaware State Hornets, declining a full offer from the Southern Connecticut Owls. He tried out for the football team as a freshman and was told if he made the team he could get the other half of his scholarship. He became a starter at cornerback his first year and went on to play for the Hornets from 1971 to 1975. He was named All-Mid-Eastern Athletic Conference three times and played on defense until being shifted to offense as a wide receiver partway through his senior year in 1975. Tullis had a five-touchdown game with the Hornets and also set the team record with 12 total interceptions. He had scored seven touchdowns through the first three games of the 1975 season when his collegiate career came to an end with a broken leg, suffered when running into the goal post while trying to make a catch. In addition to his football talents, Tullis was described as "one of the finest athletes ever to run track at DelState" by The Morning News. His best in the 200-meter dash was 20.7 seconds while he was timed at 45.9 running 400 meters.

== Professional playing and coaching career ==
Tullis was selected in the 12th round (342nd overall) of the 1976 NFL draft by the Washington Redskins. He signed with them after the draft but was released at the start of August. He then joined the New York Giants for the 1977 season but was again unable to make the final roster.

In 1978, Tullis signed with the Green Bay Packers and was the fastest wide receiver on the team with a 40-yard dash timed at 4.3 seconds. He impressed and made the final roster on special teams, being one of their top players in the unit while appearing in all 16 games. He returned in 1979 and was a backup receiver, totaling 10 receptions for 173 yards, including a 52-yard touchdown catch from Lynn Dickey. However, he was unable to make the team in 1980, being released at the final roster cuts.

Tullis then opted to enter coaching rather than continue attempting to play football, being hired in 1981 as wide receivers coach in football and head women's track and field coach at his alma mater, Delaware State. He coached the women's team to two conference championships in two seasons, and then decided to attempt a return to football by joining the New Jersey Generals of the United States Football League (USFL) in 1983. He played nine games for the Generals as a reserve, running 17 times for 123 yards (an average of 7.2 yards-per-carry) with a touchdown along with two receptions for 52 yards. Tullis moved to the Pittsburgh Maulers in 1984 after having been selected by them in the USFL expansion draft but was unable to make the squad. Later that year, he was hired as wide receivers coach and track coach for the Alabama A&M Bulldogs. He continued coaching Alabama A&M through at least 1994, had moved to Savannah State by 1997, and around 1999 returned to Weaver High School as a track coach.

== Personal life ==
In 1983, Tullis rescued a family from a fire. He was inducted into the Weaver High School Hall of Fame in 1997 and into the Delaware State Athletic Hall of Fame in 2011.
