= Mark Udinski =

American football player (born 1960)

No. 58
- Position: Center

Personal information
- Born: August 16, 1960 (age 66); Rochester, New York, U.S.
- Listed height: 6 ft 1 in (1.85 m)
- Listed weight: 262 lb (119 kg)

Career information
- High school: Delcastle Tech (New Castle, Delaware)
- College: Virginia Tech
- NFL draft: 1983: undrafted

Career history
- Miami Dolphins (1983)*; Pittsburgh Maulers (1984)
- * Offseason or practice squad member only

Career USFL statistics
- Games played: 3

Mark Udinski (born August 16, 1960) is an American former professional football player who was a center for one season in the United States Football League (USFL) for the Pittsburgh Maulers. He played college football for the Virginia Tech Hokies and was signed by the Miami Dolphins as an undrafted free agent in 1983.

== Early life and education ==
Mark Udinski was born on August 16, 1990, in Rochester, New York. He grew up near Wilmington, Delaware, and played high school football for Delcastle Tech. Originally playing on defense, Udinski was a fan of Dallas Cowboys defensive tackle Randy White growing up. As a junior at Delcastle Tech, he earned All-State honors as a linebacker. He was known as a "savage hitter", and also won the state championship in heavyweight wrestling, compiling an undefeated record.

In February 1979, Udinski was offered a four-year scholarship offer from Virginia Tech, and accepted. He saw immediate playing time as a freshman on the offensive line, enough to earn a varsity letter. Though the team's smallest offensive lineman at 235 pounds, Udinski shared a starting position as a sophomore. He became a full-time starter as a junior, playing the center position. After the season, in which his team compiled a 7–4 record, Udinski was named the team's "most outstanding lineman of the year".

He boosted his weight to 268 pounds as a senior, but was still the lightest lineman on the team. In a team practice, Udinski placed among the team's five fastest runners in the 40-yard dash with 4.9 seconds. He earned a fourth varsity letter as a senior, again being a full-time starter at center. After the season, he was named Virginia Tech's best conditioned athlete.

== Professional career ==
After going unselected in the 1983 NFL draft, Udinski signed with the Miami Dolphins as an undrafted free agent, on a two-year contract. Considered a long shot to make the roster, he was released in August.

On September 27, 1983, after being recommended by Miami Dolphins coach Don Shula, Udinski was signed by the Pittsburgh Maulers of the United States Football League (USFL). At a one-day mini-camp in December, he was one of two players the team kept, out of 100 total; the other was a former teammate of his while at Virginia Tech. Though expected to be a backup, Udinski started his first career game due to an injury to the other center. In his debut, a 3–7 loss against the Oklahoma Outlaws, he was "tossed around" all game by middle guard Bob Nelson, which led to criticism by coach Joe Pendry.

After appearing in two more games, Udinski was released by the Maulers on March 17, ending his professional football career.
