= Frank Naylor (American football) =

American football player (born 1959)

No. 51
- Position: Center / Long snapper

Personal information
- Born: January 25, 1959; Philadelphia, Pennsylvania
- Listed height: 6 ft 2 in (1.88 m)
- Listed weight: 250 lb (113 kg)

Career information
- High school: Archbishop Wood
- College: Rutgers
- NFL draft: 1982: 12th round, 311th overall pick

Career history
- Seattle Seahawks (1982)*; New Jersey Generals (1983–1985)
- * Offseason or practice squad member only

Frank Naylor was a football player in the United States Football League for the New Jersey Generals. He played at the collegiate level at Rutgers University.

== Early life ==
Naylor was born Frank John Naylor on January 25, 1959, in Philadelphia, Pennsylvania.

== College career ==
He played center at Rutgers University and graduated with a degree in communications. In 1981, his senior year, he was named AP All-East and was selected as the team MVP.

== NFL ==
=== Seattle Seahawks ===
The Seattle Seahawks drafted Naylor 311th overall in the twelfth round of the 1982 NFL draft. The Seahawks later released him on August 17, 1982.

== USFL ==
=== New Jersey Generals ===
Naylor signed with the New Jersey Generals of the United States Football League on November 24, 1982, and played in 17 games during their 1983 Inaugural Season. He returned in 1984 and played in 18 regular season games and in the playoff loss to the Philadelphia Stars. In 1985 Naylor sustained an injury to his left leg during the Generals' training camp in Orlando, Florida and was out for the entire season. During his time with the Generals, Naylor would wear jersey number 51.
