= Larry Brodsky =

American football player (born 1960)

Profile
- Position: Wide receiver

Personal information
- Born: January 19, 1960 (age 66); Miami, Florida, U.S.
- Listed height: 6 ft 0 in (1.83 m)
- Listed weight: 190 lb (86 kg)

Career information
- High school: Hialeah (FL)
- College: Miami (FL)
- NFL draft: 1982: 10th round, 268th overall pick

Career history
- Kansas City Chiefs (1982)*; New Jersey Generals (1983); Tampa Bay Bandits (1984–1985)
- * Offseason or practice squad member only

Larry Brodsky (born January 19, 1960) is an American former football wide receiver in the United States Football League (USFL) for the New Jersey Generals and Tampa Bay Bandits. He played college football for the Miami Hurricanes.

== Early life ==
Brodsky attended Hialeah Senior High School. He accepted a football scholarship from the University of Miami. He finished his college career with 100 catches for 1,696 yards and 9 touchdowns, ranking fifth on the school's All-time receiving list.

== Professional career ==
He was selected by the Kansas City Chiefs of the National Football League (NFL) in the 10th round of the 1982 NFL draft, but never appeared in a regular season NFL game.

He signed and instead played for the New Jersey Generals and Tampa Bay Bandits of the United States Football League (USFL). In his third and final USFL season, he amassed 1,071 receiving yards and seven touchdowns.

== Personal life ==
His father Joe Brodsky, was a coach in college football and in the NFL.
