= Dan Doubiago =

American football player (born 1960)

No. 66
- Position: Offensive tackle

Personal information
- Born: September 25, 1960 (age 66); Escondido, California, U.S.
- Listed height: 6 ft 5 in (1.96 m)
- Listed weight: 283 lb (128 kg)

Career information
- High school: Mendocino (Mendocino, California)
- College: Utah
- NFL draft: 1983: undrafted

Career history
- Seattle Seahawks (1983)*; Pittsburgh Maulers (1984); Los Angeles Express (1985); Orlando Renegades (1985); Kansas City Chiefs (1987)
- * Offseason or practice squad member only

Career NFL statistics
- Games played: 3
- Stats at Pro Football Reference

Daniel Clarke Doubiago (born September 25, 1960) is an American former professional football player who was an offensive tackle for one season as a replacement player with the Kansas City Chiefs of the National Football League (NFL) in 1987. He also played two seasons in the USFL. He played college football for the Utah Utes

== Early life ==
Doubiago was born on September 25, 1960, in Escondido, California. He went to high school at Mendocino (CA).

== College career ==
He played college football for the Utes at the University of Utah, where he was a tight end. In 1979 he had one catch for nine yards. In 1980 he had three catches for 47 yards and two touchdowns.

== Professional career ==
In 1984 he played for the Pittsburgh Maulers of the USFL. He played in 14 games and started 5 of them.

In 1985 he played for the Los Angeles Express of the USFL.

He also played for the Orlando Renegades in 1985.

He played three games with the Kansas City Chiefs in 1987 as a replacement player. In the three games that he played in, the Chiefs were outscored by 69. He played in week 4, 5 and 6. He did not play in any games afterwards.

== Personal life ==
In October 1987, he was arrested with one other Chiefs player for causing a disturbance at a bar. Doubiago allegedly punched the manager in the face.
