= Mel Lunsford =

American football player (born 1950)

No. 72
- Position: Defensive end

Personal information
- Born: June 13, 1950 (age 76); Cincinnati, Ohio, U.S.
- Listed height: 6 ft 3 in (1.91 m)
- Listed weight: 256 lb (116 kg)

Career information
- High school: Lockland (OH)
- College: Central State (Ohio)
- NFL draft: 1972: 3rd round, 72nd overall pick

Career history
- New England Patriots (1973–1980)

Career NFL statistics
- Sacks: 21
- Fumble recoveries: 5
- Stats at Pro Football Reference

Melvin T. Lunsford (born June 13, 1950) is an American former professional football player from 1973 to 1980 for the New England Patriots. He was selected by the Oakland Raiders in the third round of the 1972 NFL draft.

During a November game against the Bills Lunsford and several other Patriots defenders stuffed superstar running back O. J. Simpson for no gain and as Simpson tried to continue driving forward Lunsford bodyslammed him to the ground. Simpson got up and punched Lunsford which prompted Lunsford to swing back. Bills offensive lineman Reggie McKenzie then jumped on Lunsford's back but Lunsford bent down and flung McKenzie over his head and went back to swinging at Simpson before a melee of the two teams stopped the fight and ended up in a pile on the field. Lunsford and Simpson were both ejected from the game as the Patriots solid defense persisted with New England going on to win 20–10 on their way to finishing the 1976 season 11–3. The Bills finished 2–12.
