= Tom McConnaughey =

American football player and scout (born 1957)

No. 86
- Position: Wide receiver

Personal information
- Born: August 1, 1957 (age 69); Amarillo, Texas, U.S.
- Listed height: 6 ft 1 in (1.85 m)
- Listed weight: 182 lb (83 kg)

Career information
- High school: Federal Way (Federal Way, Washington)
- College: Central Arkansas

Career history
- New Orleans Saints (1981)*; New York Jets (1982)*; New Jersey Generals (1983–1984); Oakland Invaders (1985)*
- * Offseason or practice squad member only

Tom Ross McConnaughey (born August 1, 1957) is an American football scout and former player. He was a wide receiver for the New Jersey Generals of the United States Football League.

== Biography ==
McConnaughey was born on August 1, 1957, in Amarillo, Texas, and attended Federal Way High School. He attended Spokane Falls Community College, University of Oregon and the University of Central Arkansas, playing for their football teams. He played professionally for five years, including for the New Orleans Saints in 1981, and the New York Jets in 1982, as well as for the Philadelphia Eagles and the Minnesota Vikings. He later transferred into the New Jersey Generals, of the United States Football League, in 1983. After the 1984 season, the Generals replaced him for Timmy White, the father of Tim White. He then played a season with the Oakland Invaders in 1985 before retiring.

After retiring, McConnaughey became the football coach for Federal Way High School in the early 1990s. Also around this time, he was hired by Bobby Beathard as an NFL scout for the San Diego Chargers, working there for 25 seasons until 2017. He was then hired for the Jacksonville Jaguars, working there from the 2021 to the 2024 seasons. He was chosen as a scout for the 2025 Senior Bowl.
