= Tom Rozantz =

American football player

Profile
- Position: Quarterback

Personal information
- Listed height: 6 ft 1 in (1.85 m)
- Listed weight: 194 lb (88 kg)

Career information
- High school: Fairview High School
- College: William & Mary

Career history
- 1979: New Orleans Saints*
- 1980: Saskatchewan Roughriders
- 1980: Hamilton Tiger-Cats
- 1981: Toronto Argonauts
- 1983: Chicago Blitz
- 1984: Pittsburgh Maulers
- 1985: Birmingham Stallions
- * Offseason or practice squad member only

Awards and highlights
- All-Southern Conference (1976)

Career CFL statistics
- Comp-Att: 50–108
- Yards: 737
- TD–INT: 5–6
- Rushing attempts: 13
- Rushing yards: 69
- Rushing touchdowns: 1

Tom Rozantz is an American former professional football player who was a quarterback in the Canadian Football League (CFL) and United States Football League (USFL). He played college football for the William & Mary Tribe.

== Early life ==
Rozantz attended Fairview High School where he was a member of the baseball, basketball, football and wrestling teams. As a senior, he completed 140 of 266 passes for 2338 yards and was named All-County for a second straight season.

== College career ==
Rozantz was a four year starter at quarterback for the William & Mary Indians. As a freshman in 1975, he helped lead the team to an upset win over Richmond. He was named All-Southern Conference in his sophomore season and was named an honorable mention All-American by the Associated Press as a junior and senior.

== Professional career ==
Rozantz was signed by the New Orleans Saints as an undrafted free agent in 1979 but was cut during training camp. He was signed by the Saskatchewan Roughriders of the Canadian Football League (CFL) in 1980. He was traded to the Hamilton Tiger-Cats midway through the season. He was traded to the Toronto Argonauts shortly before the 1981 season and was released on September 8.

Rozantz was signed by the Chicago Blitz of the newly-formed United States Football League (USFL) in 1983. He was signed by the Pittsburgh Maulers in 1984. Rozantz was a member of the Birmingham Stallions in 1985 and spent the season as the team's third-string quarterback.
