= Sam Bowers (gridiron football) =

American gridiron football player (born 1957)

No. 89, 84
- Position: Tight end

Personal information
- Born: December 22, 1957 (age 68); White Plains, New York, U.S.
- Listed height: 6 ft 4 in (1.93 m)
- Listed weight: 250 lb (113 kg)

Career information
- High school: White Plains
- College: Fordham
- NFL draft: 1978: undrafted

Career history
- New York Jets (1980)*; New York Giants (1981)*; New York Jets (1981)*; Toronto Argonauts (1981); St. Louis Cardinals (1982)*; New Jersey Generals (1983–1985); Chicago Bears (1987)
- * Offseason or practice squad member only

Career NFL statistics
- Receptions: 1
- Receiving yards: 6
- Stats at Pro Football Reference

Samuel Tyrone Bowers (born December 22, 1957) is an American former professional football player who was a tight end for three seasons with New Jersey Generals of the United States Football League (USFL). He played college football for the Fordham Rams. He also played for the Toronto Argonauts of the Canadian Football League (CFL) and the Chicago Bears of the National Football League (NFL).

== Early life and college ==
Samuel Tyrone Bowers was born on December 22, 1957, in White Plains, New York. He played high school football at White Plains Senior High School in White Plains and earned all-county honors.

Bowers first enrolled at Tennessee State University to play college football for the Tennessee State Tigers but left the team after the coaches tried to move him to defense. He then spent two years at Westchester Community College. Bowers spent his final season of college playing for the Rams of Fordham University in 1977.

== Professional career ==
Bowers played for the Yonkers Seahawks of the Tri-State Football Alliance after his college career. He attracted the notice of the New York Jets during his time with the Seahawks. The Jets signed Bowers on May 8, 1980. He scored a touchdown during a 1980 preseason game. He was released by the Jets on August 25, 1980.

Bowers was signed by the New York Giants on February 1, 1981. He was released on August 10, 1981.

He signed with the Jets again on August 18, 1981, but was soon released on August 25, 1981.

Bowers signed with the Toronto Argonauts of the Canadian Football League on October 22, 1981. He dressed in one game for the Argonauts before being released on October 29, 1981. He signed with the Argonauts again in 1982. However, on June 1, 1982, he was released before the start of the season.

Bowers was signed by the St. Louis Cardinals of the NFL on June 28, 1982. He was released on August 31, 1982.

On December 15, 1982, Bowers signed with the New Jersey Generals of the United States Football League (USFL) for the 1983 season. He played in all 18 games, starting nine, for the Generals in 1983, catching 43 passes for 715 yards and one touchdown. He appeared in 12 games, starting nine for the second consecutive season, in 1984, recording 23 receptions for 406 yards and two touchdowns. Bowers missed part of the 1984 season due to injury. He caught 35 passes for 618 yards and four touchdowns in 1985. The USFL folded after the 1985 season. Bowers was the Generals' all-time leader in receiving yards with 1,739.

On September 23, 1987, Bowers signed with the Chicago Bears during the 1987 NFL players strike. He played in three games for the Bears and caught one pass for six yards. He was released on October 19, 1987, after the strike ended.
