= Pittsburgh Maulers (1984) =

Defunct American football team

Logo

General information
- Founded: April 28, 1983
- Folded: October 26, 1984
- Headquartered: Three Rivers Stadium in Pittsburgh, Pennsylvania
- Colors: Purple, Renaissance Red, Gray, White

Personnel
- Owner: Edward J. DeBartolo, Sr.
- General manager: George Heddleston
- Head coach: Joe Pendry (2–8); Ellis Rainsberger (interim) (1–7); Hank Bullough (would be 1985 coach)

Team history
- Pittsburgh Maulers (1984)

Home fields
- Three Rivers Stadium (1984)

League / conference affiliations
- United States Football League (1984): Eastern Conference (1984); Atlantic Division (1984)

The Pittsburgh Maulers were a team that competed in the 1984 season of the United States Football League. Their most prominent player was first pick overall in the 1984 USFL draft, running back Mike Rozier of Nebraska, who won the Heisman Trophy, collegiate football's most prestigious individual award.

They were owned by shopping mall magnate Edward J. DeBartolo, Sr., the father of Edward J. DeBartolo, Jr., then-owner of the San Francisco 49ers of the National Football League and the Pittsburgh Penguins of the National Hockey League. The Maulers played at Three Rivers Stadium.

== History ==
No one was surprised when two groups filed for a Pittsburgh franchise in the winter of 1983. It did come as a considerable surprise that DeBartolo, Sr. was one of them, given his son's ownership of the 49ers. However, while the other group contented itself with holding a rally to demonstrate support for a potential franchise, DeBartolo stole a march by securing an all-important lease for Three Rivers Stadium. A few days later, DeBartolo's longtime right-hand man, former Steeler Paul Martha, informed the other owners and Commissioner Chet Simmons that his boss was not only applying for a franchise, but already had a lease.

There was some debate over whether to approve DeBartolo's bid, with some fearing that they were effectively allowing an NFL owner into their circle. It was an open secret that Eddie, Sr. and Eddie, Jr. worked closely together. Ultimately, the owners realized that DeBartolo would lend the upstart league instant credibility and unanimously approved his bid, making him the first owner of a USFL expansion team. Unusually, DeBartolo applied for the franchise in his own name, rather than setting up a corporation or partnership. He also paid the full $6.25 million expansion fee up front. A name-the-team contest yielded the nickname "Maulers," after the sledgehammer-wielding workers in steel foundries.

The NFL itself threatened an investigation over a possible Cleveland Spiders-style conflict of interest due to the father owning a USFL team and the son owning an NFL team, an accusation both father and son insisted was not the case. Ultimately, the NFL asked Eddie, Jr. to leave the room during any USFL discussions.

DeBartolo immediately made waves by beginning talks with Dan Marino, a Pittsburgh native and the quarterback for the hometown Pitt Panthers (he ultimately signed with the NFL's Miami Dolphins). Joe Pendry, the offensive coordinator for the 1983 finalist Philadelphia Stars, became head coach.

The Maulers opened their home season with a March 11, 1984 sellout crowd at Three Rivers Stadium facing the Birmingham Stallions, a team led by Cliff Stoudt, who had spent much of the previous season as the starter for the Pittsburgh Steelers, and had been Terry Bradshaw's backup for years before then. Fans bombarded Stoudt with snowballs and ice whenever the Stallions entered the red zone. The Maulers lost, 30-18, in what would be the team's only sellout.

The team finished 3–15, tying the Washington Federals for the worst record in the league. However, while undermanned, they were not nearly as bad as their record indicated. They were in part victims of a very tough schedule. They played nine games against playoff teams and caught a lot of the other teams when they were hot—Oklahoma and New Orleans early and San Antonio and Jacksonville late. Seven of their losses were by fewer than 10 points.

The team was built around the idea that Dallas Cowboys longtime third-string QB Glenn Carano would be a strong starter in the USFL. To support Carano, the team had RB Mike Rozier–the second straight Heisman Trophy winner to sign with a USFL team–and WR Greg Anderson, who caught 63 passes. Carano had his moments but he struggled overall, completing only 53.7% of his passes with 13 touchdowns and 19 interceptions. Backup Tom Rozantz was expected to mostly carry a clipboard, but he ended up playing a lot and he struggled as well. However, either would have been a disappointment, as most fans expected the Maulers to pick Steve Young rather than Mike Rozier. Even bringing in former Arizona Wranglers star WR Jackie Flowers did not turn around the offense. The defense, led by CB Jerry Holmes and DE Sam Clancy finished a respectable eighth in points allowed. In spite of this, they were hobbled by a low-octane offense.

In the middle of a 17-7 loss to the Memphis Showboats, DeBartolo told general manager George Heddleston to tell Pendry to yank Carano in favor of backup Tom Rozantz. Pendry refused to do so, even when Carano dislocated his right arm and could not throw without "tremendous pain" shooting through it. A fuming DeBartolo ordered Heddleston and Pendry to meet with him at his office in Youngstown, Ohio the next morning. Pendry refused to come, and quit rather than be fired. Offensive line coach Ellis Rainsberger took over as interim coach for the rest of the season.

They closed the season against Jacksonville in a torrential rainstorm; one sideline of the Gator Bowl was so badly flooded that both teams had to share the other sideline.

=== Vote for a fall schedule kills franchise ===
Despite losing millions of dollars and only winning three games, the Maulers were competitive in most games. They also attracted 22,858 per game, a respectable figure—at least by USFL standards—for an expansion team. DeBartolo was determined to stick it out, even going as far as hiring Hank Bullough away from the Green Bay Packers to become the new head coach. The fan support in such a strong sports town such as Pittsburgh can be attributed to a combination of factors. At the time the Maulers arrived, the Steelers were in the middle of an on-field decline following their 1970s dominance. The Penguins were all but invisible in the Pittsburgh market (though the team had just drafted Mario Lemieux). The Pittsburgh Pirates were experiencing an on- and off-field collapse that would be topped off by the 1985 Pittsburgh drug trials and the team nearly relocating to Denver.

However, just a few days after Bullough's hiring, the USFL voted to switch to a fall schedule in 1986. DeBartolo was a strong believer in the USFL's original spring football concept, and he knew the Maulers could not hope to go head-to-head against the Steelers. Sharing Three Rivers Stadium would have caused serious logistical problems early in the fall, with the Maulers, Pirates and Steelers fighting for dates. A move to Cleveland, closer to DeBartolo's home in Youngstown, was quickly ruled out; even without the daunting task of going head-to-head with the Cleveland Browns (then a solid playoff team) to consider, similar conflicts with the Cleveland Indians sharing Cleveland Stadium at the time rendered this potential move impractical as well.

As a result, just a week after the vote to move to the fall, DeBartolo decided to fold the team without so much as a press conference. He announced that he intended to merge the Maulers with another team. Initially, he struck a merger agreement with the Stars, who had been forced to move to Baltimore after concluding they could not compete with the NFL's Eagles. However, just months later, at the urging of his wife Marie, DeBartolo sold his stake in the Stars and got out of the league entirely. The league's abandonment of Pittsburgh was later cited as a factor in the USFL failing to secure a large judgment in its antitrust suit against the NFL; although it technically won, the jury only awarded it $3 in damages.

Amidst several USFL teams that were "one-season wonders" as a result of relocating, merging with other teams and/or changing team names (all off-season), the Pittsburgh Maulers have the distinction of being the only USFL team to play with no connections to any other cities or teams, neither before nor after their only season.

=== 1984 Pittsburgh Maulers schedule ===
==== Preseason ====
Week	Date	Opponent	Result	Record	Venue	Attendance
1	January 28	at Jacksonville Bulls	T 0–0	0–0–1	Gator Bowl Stadium	10,000
2	Bye					
3	February 11	vs. Washington Federals	W 31–7	1–0–1	Melbourne, Florida	6,000
4	February 18	vs. Jacksonville Bulls	W 13–10	2–0–1	Melbourne, Florida	4,500

==== Regular season ====
Week	Date	Opponent	Result	Record	Venue	Attendance
1	February 26	at Oklahoma Outlaws	L 3–7	0–1	Skelly Stadium	15,937
2	March 3	at Michigan Panthers	L 24–27	0–2	Pontiac Silverdome	44,485
3	March 11	Birmingham Stallions	L 18–30	0–3	Three Rivers Stadium	53,771
4	March 18	at Washington Federals	W 16–7	1–3	RFK Stadium	10,121
5	March 24	Philadelphia Stars	L 10–25	1–4	Three Rivers Stadium	24,341
6	April 1	Oakland Invaders	W 28–14	2–4	Three Rivers Stadium	22,408
7	April 8	at New Orleans Breakers	L 24–27	2–5	Louisiana Superdome	39,315
8	April 14	Denver Gold	L 12–31	2–6	Three Rivers Stadium	16,773
9	April 22	New Jersey Generals	L 10–14	2–7	Three Rivers Stadium	14,418
10	April 27	at Memphis Showboats	L 7–17	2–8	Liberty Bowl Memorial Stadium	30,640
11	May 5	at Los Angeles Express	L 12–20	2–9	Los Angeles Memorial Coliseum	16,789
12	May 12	Houston Gamblers	L 26–47	2–10	Three Rivers Stadium	24,880
13	May 21	at New Jersey Generals	L 14–16	2–11	Giants Stadium	41,212
14	May 27	Washington Federals	W 15–6	3–11	Three Rivers Stadium	15,153
15	June 4	at Philadelphia Stars	L 17–23	3–12	Veterans Stadium	30,102
16	June 11	San Antonio Gunslingers	L 3–21	3–13	Three Rivers Stadium	17,148
17	June 16	Tampa Bay Bandits	L 9–21	3–14	Three Rivers Stadium	16,832
18	June 22	at Jacksonville Bulls	L 2–26	3–15	Gator Bowl Stadium	31,843

== Players of note ==
=== Complete roster ===
1984 Pittsburgh Maulers roster
Quarterbacks (QB): 11 Dave Boisture; 18 Glenn Carano; 14 Tom Rozantz; Running backs (RB): 31 Ira Albright; 44 Joel Coles FB; 46 Walt Easley FB; 43 Tony Ellis FB; 20 Walter Holman; 48 Dennis Johnson FB; 32 Amos Lawrence; 22 William Miller; 21 Hollis Payton; 30 Mike Rozier; 34 George Works FB; Wide receivers (WR): 80 Greg Anderson; 82 Reggie Butts; 89 Johnnie Dirden; 85 T. K. Ehlebracht; 82 Jimmy Ferranti; 84 Jackie Flowers; 81 Ricky Martin; 89 Sylvester Moy; 88 Shawn Potts; 81 Jim Taylor; Tight ends (TE): 85 Al Kimichik; 83 Mark Raugh; 87 Mike Shaw	Offensive linemen (OL): 65 Scott Burris C/G; 59 Bruce Byrom; 69 Don Corbin G; 55 Chuck Correal C; 72 Dan Doubiago T; 70 Claybon Fields T; 66 Ron Hausauer G; 61 Donnie Hickman T/G; 75 Jim Lohmann G; 64 Joe Lukens G; 76 Don Maggs T; 74 Todd Thomas T; 58 Mark Udinski; 58 Jeff Harper; Defensive linemen (DL): 94 James Black DE; 77 Sam Clancy DE; 95 Ken Dombrowski DE; 97 David Graham DE; 93 Ike Griffin DE; 99 Doug Hollie DE; 92 Ed McAleney DT; 78 Archie Reese DT; 91 Mike Rustmeyer DT; 92 Laval Short DT; 90 Troy Thomas DT	Linebackers (LB): 50 Earnest Adams; 54 Ron Crosby; 56 Ron Freeman; 57 Bruce Huther; 51 Howard McAdoo; 56 Mike McKibben; 58 Dan Skutack; 52 Craig Walls; Defensive backs (DB): 25 Less Browne FS; 41 Jeff Delaney SS; 27 Larry Friday SS; 22 Derrick Goddard SS; 26 Mark Harper CB; 25 Troy Hill CB; 47 Jerry Holmes CB; 29 Jesse Johnson SS; 24 David Langlois FS; 23 Jim Perryman FS; 29 Dan Short SS; 40 Sam Sopp SS; 28 Mickey Sutton CB; 21 Billy Yancy CB; Special teams (ST): 5 Mickey Barilla K; 8 Tony Lee K; 1 Eric Schubert K; 7 Larry Swider P	Rookies in italics

Duplicate numbers listed due to roster movement during the season
-- = roster number information unavailable

=== All-USFL players ===
The following Maulers players have been named to All-USFL Teams:

- CB Jerry Holmes

== Statistics and records ==
=== Season-by-season record ===
Note: The finish, wins, losses, and ties columns list regular season results and exclude any postseason play.

Legend
USFL champions	Conference champions	Division champions	Wild Card berth

Pittsburgh Maulers season-by-season records
Season	Team	League	Conference	Division	Regular season				Postseason results	Awards
Season	Team	League	Conference	Division	Finish	Wins	Losses	Ties	Postseason results	Awards
1984	1984	USFL	Eastern	Atlantic	T-3rd	3	15	0	None	–

=== Records ===
All-time Maulers leaders
Leader	Player	Record	Years with Maulers
Passing	Glenn Carano	2,368 passing yards	1984
Rushing	Mike Rozier	792 rushing yards	1984
Receiving	Greg Anderson	994 receiving yards	1984
Coaching wins	Joe Pendry	2 wins	1984
Sacks	Sam Clancy	16.0 sacks	1984
Interceptions	4 players tied	2 interception	1984
