= Wayne Bolt =

American football coach

Biographical details
- Born: Augusta, Georgia, U.S.

Playing career
- 1976–1980: East Carolina
- Position: Offensive lineman

Coaching career (HC unless noted)
- 1980: Wyoming (assistant)
- 1981–1985: Auburn (TE)
- 1986–1989: Clemson (TE)
- 1990: Auburn (offensive assistant)
- 1991–1996: Troy State (OL)
- 1997–2002: Troy State (DC/AHC)
- 2003–2005: UAB (DC)
- 2006–2008: Iowa State (DC)
- 2009–2012: Auburn (director of football)
- 2013–2014: Troy (DC)

Wayne Bolt is an American college football coach who most recently serving as the defensive coordinator for Troy University. Previously to being named to the position, he served as the Director of Football Relations for Auburn University. Bolt took the job in 2009 upon the urging of head coach Gene Chizik. Prior to joining the Auburn staff, Bolt had previously served as defensive coordinator to Chizik at Iowa State University. Bolt also had previous connections to Auburn, having served as an assistant at the school under head coach Pat Dye.

Bolt has coached 10 teams that made bowl games at UAB, Troy, Clemson, and Auburn. During his time as a position coach, he tutored over 20 players who went on to play in the National Football League (NFL).

== Career ==
Bolt is a 1974 graduate of the Academy of Richmond County and played college football at East Carolina University, where he was an All-American offensive lineman. Upon graduation, he joined the staff as an assistant coach. When head coach Pat Dye was hired away from ECU, Bolt joined Dye's staff at Wyoming. When Dye took the head coaching position at Auburn in 1981, Bolt again followed his mentor to the Plains as the tight end coach. Bolt left Auburn to join Danny Ford's staff at Clemson as tight-ends coach in 1986, but again returned to Auburn in 1990.

In 1991, Bolt joined the staff at Troy University, working under fellow former Auburn assistant Larry Blakeney as the offensive line coach. In 1997, he was promoted to defensive coordinator and assistant head coach for the Trojans. Bolt's defenses were extremely successful at Troy. In 2002, in only the second season competing at the NCAA I-A level, the Trojans produced one of the nation's top defenses under Bolt's guidance. The Trojans ranked 4th nationally in total defense, yielding only 276.8 yards per game. The unit ranked 13th in rushing defense (105.3 yards per game), 30th in scoring defense (21.0 ppg) and 33rd in pass efficiency defense (112.42).

Following his success at Troy, Bolt left the school in January 2003 to head the defense at the University of Alabama at Birmingham. He served on Watson Brown's staff until being fired from his position with the Blazers following the 2005 season.

New head coach Gene Chizik hired Bolt to join his staff at Iowa State University in December 2006. When Chizik left the Cyclones to take the vacant head coaching position at Auburn, he brought Bolt along in an administrative capacity. He was named the Director of Football Operations for the Tigers in March 2009. He released from that position in December 2012 upon the hiring of Gus Malzahn as head football coach.

Bolt returned to full-time coaching in January 2013 when he was named defensive coordinator at Troy University, replacing Jeremy Rowell.
