= J. Walter Duncan =

US businessman in the oil and gas industry

J. Walter Duncan Jr. (November 26, 1916 – February 21, 2009) was an American businessman. He was born in Illinois, but moved to Oklahoma in 1949. He worked in the oil and gas industry. He held a 90 percent interest in the New Jersey Generals for only one season before he and co-owner Chuck Fairbanks sold the United States Football League (USFL) franchise to Donald Trump on September 22, 1983.
