= Joe Pendry =

American football coach (born 1947)

Profile
- Position: End

Personal information
- Born: August 5, 1947 (age 79); Welch, West Virginia, U.S.

Career information
- High school: Oceana High School (West Virginia)
- College: West Virginia

Career history

Coaching
- West Virginia (1971–1972) Wide receivers coach; West Virginia (1973–1974) Offensive line coach; Kansas State (1975) Offensive coordinator; West Virginia (1976–1977) Offensive coordinator; Pittsburgh (1978–1979) Quarterbacks coach; Michigan State (1980–1981) Offensive coordinator & quarterbacks coach; Philadelphia Stars (1982–1983) Offensive coordinator; Pittsburgh Maulers (1984) Head coach; Cleveland Browns (1985) Offensive coordinator; Cleveland Browns (1986–1988) Running backs coach; Kansas City Chiefs (1989–1992) Offensive coordinator & quarterbacks coach; Chicago Bears (1993–1994) Running backs coach; Carolina Panthers (1995–1997) Offensive coordinator; Buffalo Bills (1998–2000) Offensive coordinator; Washington Redskins (2001) Offensive line coach; Houston Texans (2005–2006) Offensive line coach & interim offensive coordinator; Alabama (2007–2010) Assistant head coach & offensive line coach

Operations
- Birmingham Iron (2019) General manager

Head coaching record
- Regular season: USFL: 2–8 (.200)
- Coaching profile at Pro Football Reference

Joseph Pendry (born August 5, 1947) is an American former football coach. From 1971 until 2010, he was an assistant coach or offensive coordinator for multiple teams in both the collegiate and professional ranks.

Between 2007 and 2010, Pendry served as the assistant head coach and offensive line coach for the Alabama Crimson Tide. His tenure included a SEC Championship and BCS National Championship. On January 13, 2011, he decided to retire from coaching after 41 years of serving in various capacities.

In 2019, Pendry served as the general manager of the Birmingham Iron of the Alliance of American Football.
