= Maurice Carthon =

American football player and coach (born 1961)

No. 44
- Position: Fullback

Personal information
- Born: April 24, 1961 (age 65); Chicago, Illinois, U.S.
- Listed height: 6 ft 1 in (1.85 m)
- Listed weight: 225 lb (102 kg)

Career information
- High school: Osceola (Osceola, Arkansas)
- College: Arkansas State
- NFL draft: 1983: undrafted

Career history

Playing
- New Jersey Generals (1983–1985); New York Giants (1985–1991); Indianapolis Colts (1992)

Coaching
- New England Patriots (1994–1996) Running backs coach; New York Jets (1997–2000) Running backs coach; Detroit Lions (2001–2002) Offensive coordinator; Dallas Cowboys (2003–2004) Offensive coordinator; Cleveland Browns (2005–2006) Offensive coordinator; Arizona Cardinals (2007–2008) Running backs coach; Kansas City Chiefs (2009–2012) Assistant head coach

Awards and highlights
- 2× Super Bowl champion (XXI, XXV); 2× First-team All-SLC (1981, 1982)

Career NFL statistics
- Rushing yards: 950
- Rushing average: 3.2
- Rushing touchdowns: 2
- Receptions: 90
- Receiving yards: 745
- Receiving touchdowns: 1
- Stats at Pro Football Reference
- Coaching profile at Pro Football Reference

Maurice Carthon (born April 24, 1961) is an American former professional football player and coach. He played as a fullback in the United States Football League (USFL) and National Football League (NFL) for a total of 11 seasons. After his playing career ended, he became a coach, and served as the offensive coordinator for three NFL teams.

== Early life ==
Carthon attended Osceola High School in Osceola, Arkansas, and was a letterman in football and basketball. In football, he was a two-time All-Conference honoree where he played tight end. In basketball, he was named the state's Most Valuable Player as a senior.

== College career ==
Carthon accepted a football scholarship from Arkansas State University, where he was coached by Larry Lacewell. In football, he was a two-time All-Southland Conference selection, and as a senior, he was the team's captain and led the team in rushing yards (682).

He finished his college career with 362 carries for 1,583 yards, 26 receptions and seven touchdowns. He was a member of Kappa Alpha Psi fraternity.

In 1991, Carthon was inducted into the Arkansas State hall of honor. In 2002, he was inducted into the Arkansas State ring of honor. He was named to the Southland Conference 1980's All-Decade team. In 2005, he was inducted into the Arkansas Sports Hall of Fame.

== Professional career ==
=== New Jersey Generals ===
Carthon was selected by the New Jersey Generals in the eighth round (94th overall) of the 1983 USFL draft. As a rookie, he collected 90 carries for 334 yards and three touchdowns.

In 1984, Carthon started all 18 games, registering 1,042 yards and 11 rushing touchdowns. That same season his backfield mate, Herschel Walker led the league with 1,339 rushing yards. This was the third time in professional football that teammates had rushed for over 1,000 yards each in the same season (Csonka/Morris – 1972 and Harris/Bleier – 1976). Subsequently, it was also achieved by Mack/Byner – 1985; Dunn/Vick – 2006; Jacobs/Ward – 2008; Stewart/Williams – 2009 and Jackson/Ingram - 2019.

In 1985, Carthon played a final season with the Generals, posting 175 carries for 726 yards and 6 touchdowns.

=== New York Giants ===
In 1985, Carthon signed as a free agent with the New York Giants. From February to June, his USFL career consisted of three preseason games, 18 regular season games, and a final playoff on June 30, 1985. After reporting to the Giants in July, he played an additional five preseason games, 16 regular season games, and two playoff rounds, for a total of 45 contests in less than a year.

Carthon wore the number 44 in his career as a fullback with the Giants. He was considered a bruising back with superb blocking skills. Carthon was a very durable player, missing only one game out of 76 when he was with the Giants.

Carthon won two championship rings with the Giants, in Super Bowl XXI and Super Bowl XXV. His best season was in 1986, when he finished as the team's second leading rusher with 260 yards, while also helping diminutive halfback Joe Morris rush for a then-franchise record 1,516 yards.

Carthon retired after the 1992 season with 950 career rushing yards, 90 receptions for 745 yards, and 3 touchdowns.

== Coaching career ==
Maurice Carthon resigned as Cleveland Browns offensive coordinator on October 24, 2006, after Cleveland managed only seven points against the Denver Broncos. Under Carthon, the Browns had managed a league-low 232 points in 2005 and had only scored 88 points through six games in 2006. Carthon was the third NFL offensive coordinator to be replaced during the 2006 season.

In early 2008, reports surfaced about a potential reuniting of Carthon and old coach Bill Parcells in Miami. Carthon would not be a candidate for the Miami Dolphins head coaching vacancy, but rather a candidate for offensive coordinator.

Carthon been known as a "Parcells Guy", following his former coach from coaching place to place. He has coached under Parcells for the New England Patriots, the New York Jets and, most recently, the Dallas Cowboys.

On February 19, 2009, the Kansas City Chiefs announced that the club added Carthon to head coach Todd Haley’s coaching staff. Carthon served as assistant head coach. When Haley was fired on December 12, 2011, Carthon was retained in the same role under Romeo Crennel. He was let go the following season, 2012, when the Chiefs went 2-14 and has not returned to coaching since.

== Personal life ==
Carthon's son Ran played running back for the Indianapolis Colts, and was general manager for the Tennessee Titans.
