= New Jersey Generals =

American football team (1982–1986)

General information
- Founded: 1982
- Folded: 1986
- Headquartered: Giants Stadium in East Rutherford, New Jersey
- Colors: Scarlet red, white, royal blue, gold, brown

Personnel
- Owners: 1983 J. Walter Duncan/Chuck Fairbanks; 1984–1985 Donald Trump
- Head coach: 1983 Chuck Fairbanks (6–12); 1984–1985 Walt Michaels (25–13)

Team history
- New Jersey Generals (1983–1985)

Home fields
- Giants Stadium (1983–1985)

League / conference affiliations
- United States Football League (1983–1985): Eastern Conference (1984–1985); Atlantic Division (1983–1984)

Playoff appearances (2)
- 1984, 1985

The New Jersey Generals were a professional American football team in the United States Football League (USFL). They were established in 1982 to begin play in the spring and summer of 1983. The team played three seasons from 1983 to 1985, winning 31 regular season games and losing 25 while going 0–2 in postseason competition. Home games were played at Giants Stadium in East Rutherford, New Jersey, which was called The Meadowlands for Generals games.

== Uniforms ==
Team colors were scarlet, white, royal blue and sunflower gold. The primary logo was a gold five-star general wreath. Team helmets were solid scarlet with the logo decal on each side and a white face-mask. Home uniforms featured red jerseys with white numbers trimmed in royal blue, with numbers on the sleeves and no striping; pants were white with a single wide red stripe trimmed in blue down the sides from hip to knee. Road jerseys were white with red numbers trimmed in blue. The team was the second in the New York metropolitan area to be known as "Generals," since there was a professional soccer team in the late 1960s known as the New York Generals.

== History ==
=== 1983 ===
From the beginning, USFL founder David Dixon placed a premium on putting a team in the New York area. Initially, Donald Trump was tapped to own the team. However, he backed out after paying an initial installment on the franchise fee, hoping instead to buy the struggling Baltimore Colts of the NFL. Needing a credible owner with the means to front a team in the nation's biggest market, Dixon persuaded Oklahoma oil magnate J. Walter Duncan to step in. Duncan had originally been slated to own the USFL's Chicago franchise, as he'd grown up in Chicago. However, he readily agreed to shift to New York.

Duncan took on former New England Patriots coach Chuck Fairbanks as a minority partner; Duncan knew Fairbanks from his days as head coach at the University of Oklahoma. Fairbanks also served as general manager and head coach. They initially had an uphill battle to get a lease at Giants Stadium, but were able to obtain one on condition that they brand their team as "New Jersey" rather than "New York." They named the team the "Generals" after the large number of generals based in New Jersey during the Revolutionary War.

The team made a big splash by signing Heisman Trophy–winning underclassman Herschel Walker, a running back from the University of Georgia. While the USFL had followed the NFL's lead in banning underclassmen from playing, league officials were certain that this rule would never withstand a court challenge. In an even more ominous development, Walker did not sign a standard player contract. Rather, he agreed to a three-year personal-services contract with Duncan. The contract was valued at $4.2 million—more than double the USFL's salary cap of $1.8 million. Nonetheless, the other owners knew having the incumbent Heisman winner in their fold would lend the USFL instant credibility, and allowed the contract to stand.

Despite the signing of Walker, who rushed for 1,812 yards and 17 touchdowns, the Generals finished their inaugural season with a 6–12 record. This was largely due to a porous defense which gave up the third-most points in the league (437) and a feeble passing attack led by ex-New Orleans Saints career backup Bobby Scott.

=== 1984 ===
At 66 years old, Duncan soon tired of flying as far as 1,500 miles (2,400 km) from his home in Oklahoma City to see his team play. Believing that the Generals were far too important to the USFL to have an absentee owner, he decided to sell to a local buyer. After the 1983 season, he found one in Donald Trump, who had initially angled for the franchise in 1982 before backing out.

Trump promptly fired Fairbanks. Seeking a high-profile coach, he initially tried to lure Joe Gibbs of the Washington Redskins. When those talks failed, he turned to legendary Miami Dolphins coach Don Shula. Trump offered him a $5 million contract. Shula was receptive, but insisted on getting a rent-free apartment at Trump Tower. In October 1983, Trump announced that the deal was all but done, but the only snag was Shula's insistence on an apartment. A furious Shula broke off talks. Years later, former Dolphins' running back Larry Csonka, by then an executive with the Jacksonville Bulls, said that he believed Shula would have taken the job, but was angered at being "thrown out to the press" by Trump. After Joe Paterno of Penn State turned him down as well, Trump hired former New York Jets head coach Walt Michaels.

The Generals responded to their poor 1983 showing with an influx of veteran NFL talent for 1984, including wide receiver Tom McConnaughey, quarterback Brian Sipe, defensive back Gary Barbaro, and linebackers Jim LeClair and Bobby Leopold. Both Walker and fullback Maurice Carthon rushed for over 1,000 yards (Walker 1,339; Carthon 1,042) as the Generals went 14–4, defeating the eventual champion Philadelphia Stars twice for that franchise's only two losses of the season. The Stars defeated the Generals 28–7 in a first round playoff game.

=== 1985 ===
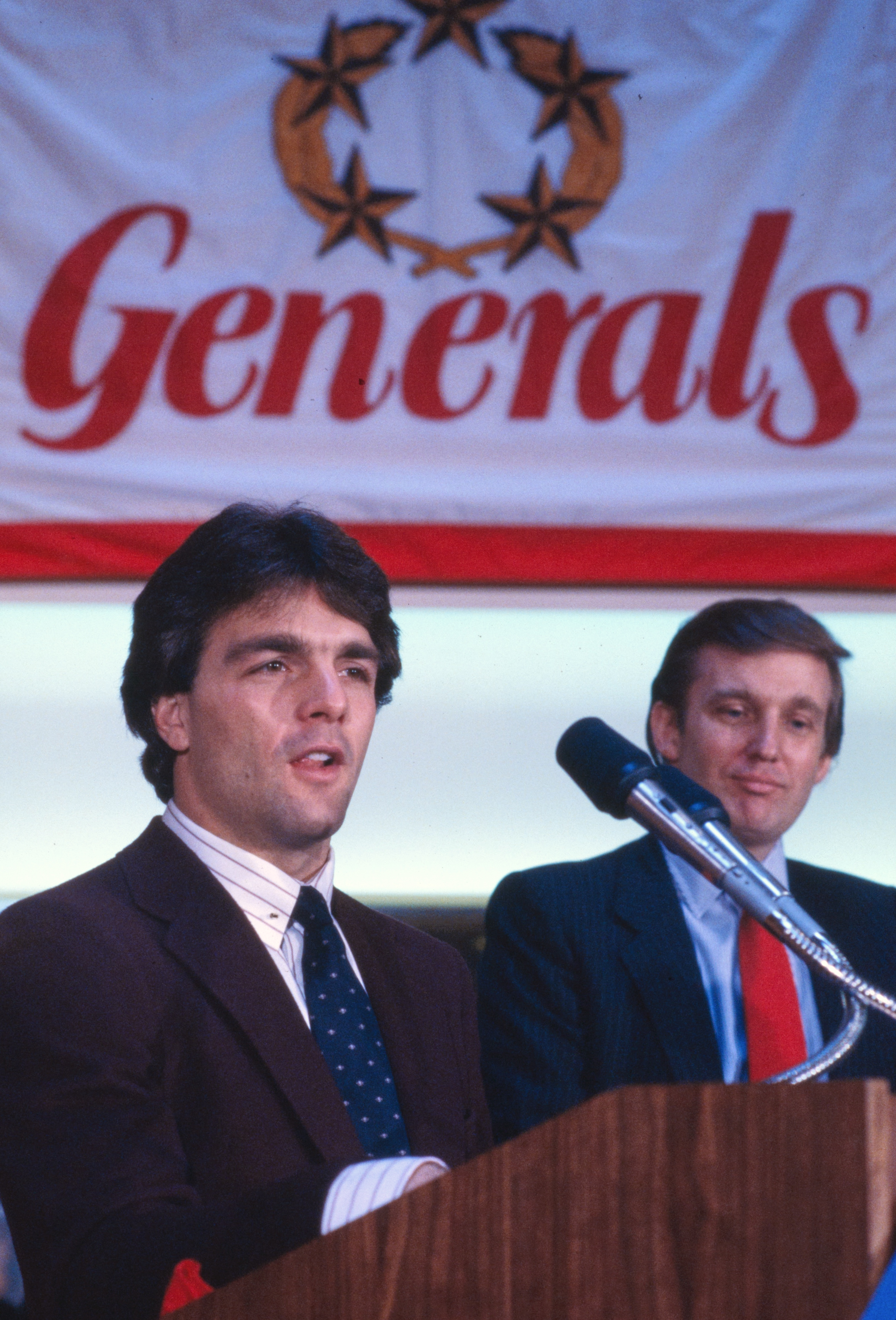
Doug Flutie, Donald Trump, Generals football press conference at Trump Tower, February 1985

The 1985 season saw the heralded signing of Heisman Trophy-winning quarterback Doug Flutie of Boston College. Despite Flutie's inexperience, the Generals traded Sipe to the Jacksonville Bulls to ensure Flutie would start. Flutie struggled at times but played well overall until he suffered a broken collarbone against the Memphis Showboats in the season's 15th game, sidelining him for the rest of the season. The 1985 Generals finished 11–7 behind Walker's pro-football record 2,411 rushing yards but lost again to the Stars (transplanted to Baltimore) in the first round of the playoffs, 20–17.

=== 1986 ===
Almost from the moment he bought the Generals, Trump sought to use them as a vehicle to get an NFL team. To this end, he began advocating moving the USFL from a spring schedule to a fall schedule, directly opposite the NFL. Trump's long-term plans called for moving the Generals across the Hudson River to New York, which had not had a team play within its borders since the Jets moved from Shea Stadium in Queens to the Meadowlands after the 1983 season. He intended to have the renamed New York Generals play at Shea until the construction of a new 80,000-seat "Trump Stadium" in Manhattan; the stadium never came to fruition.

In 1984, Trump convinced most of his fellow owners to move to a fall schedule in 1986. He contended that if the USFL were to hold its own against the NFL, it would eventually force a merger with the more established league—in which the owners of any USFL teams included in a merger would see their investment more than double.

The Generals acquired the assets of one of the teams displaced by the vote to move to the fall, the Houston Gamblers, during the extended off-season. This was widely reported as a merger, since the Generals inherited all of the Gamblers' player contracts—including those of quarterback Jim Kelly and wide receiver Ricky Sanders. Michaels was fired, replaced with former Gamblers coach Jack Pardee, who planned to bring Kelly and the Gamblers' high-powered run and shoot offense with him. Fans immediately dubbed the Kelly–Walker led Generals as the USFL's "Dream Team."

However, the revamped Generals never played a down. The 1986 season was cancelled after the USFL won only a nominal one dollar verdict in an antitrust lawsuit against the NFL (which was tripled to three dollars due to it being an antitrust suit); the league folded soon afterward.

Numerous Generals players, including Flutie, Walker, and center Kent Hull went on to productive NFL careers. Flutie also starred in the Canadian Football League; Hull (with Gambler quarterback Kelly) played in four Super Bowls with the Buffalo Bills, and Flutie was the last quarterback to have led the Bills to the NFL playoffs until the 2017 season.

== Single-season leaders ==
- Rushing yards: 2,411 Herschel Walker (1985; USFL record)
- Receiving yards: 715 Sam Bowers (1983)
- Passing yards: 2,540 Brian Sipe (1984)
- Sacks: 13 James Lockette (1985)

== Season-by-season ==
Season	Regular season				Playoffs		
Season	W	L	T	Finish	W	L	Results
1983	6	12	0	3rd, Atlantic	—	—	—
1984	14	4	0	2nd, Atlantic	0	1	Lost Divisional Playoffs (Philadelphia)
1985	11	7	0	2nd, Eastern	0	1	Lost Quarterfinals (Baltimore)
Total	31	23	0		0	2	
