= History of sports in Mobile, Alabama =

Mobile, Alabama is home to many different sports teams and events. It is also home to several notable athletes.

== Events ==
=== Azalea Trail Run ===
The Azalea Trail Run is an annual 10K race and 2-mile fun run held each Spring which winds through the streets of historic downtown Mobile.

=== LendingTree Bowl ===
The LendingTree Bowl(previously the Mobile Alabama Bowl, GMAC Bowl, Go Daddy Bowl, and Dollar General Bowl) is a post-season NCAA-sanctioned Division I-A college football bowl game played annually at Ladd–Peebles Stadium in Mobile, Alabama. It pits a Sun Belt Conference team against a team from the Mid-American Conference.

=== Senior Bowl ===
The Senior Bowl is an annual post-season college football exhibition game played in Mobile, Alabama which showcases the best NFL draft prospects of those collegiate players who have completed their eligibility. The game has been played in Mobile's Ladd–Peebles Stadium since 1951.

== Baseball ==
Mobile is hometown to five baseball Hall of Fame members and rates as the third city with the most players honored in Cooperstown, New York, home of the Hall of fame. Only New York City and Chicago lead Mobile in this distinction.

=== Mobile Hall of Famers ===
- Hank Aaron
- Billy Williams
- Willie McCovey
- Satchel Paige
- Ozzie Smith

=== List of baseball teams ===
- Mobile Swamp Angels, Southern League (1887)
- Mobile Blackbirds, Southern League (1892–1893, 1896)
- Mobile Bluebirds, Southern League (1894–1895)
- Mobile Sea Gulls, Cotton States League (1905–1907)
- Mobile Sea Gulls, Southern Association (1908–1917)
- Mobile Bears, Southern Association (1918–1930, 1944–1961)
- Mobile Marines, Southern Association (1931)
- Mobile Red Warriors, Southeastern League (1932)
- Mobile Shippers, Southeastern League (1937–1942)
- Mobile A's, Southern League (1966)
- Mobile White Sox, Southern League (1970)
- Mobile BaySharks, Texas-Louisiana League (1994–1995)
- Mobile Bay Bears, Southern League (1997–2019)

=== Mobile Bears ===
Originally known as the Sea Gulls, Mobile changed its name to the Bears in 1918. In just two seasons, the Bears won the Southern Association Championship and the Dixie Series Championship over the Fort Worth Panthers, the Texas League Champions. The Bears relocated to Knoxville in 1931. In 1944, the Southern Association's Knoxville Smokies moved to Mobile and were renamed the Mobile Bears. The Mobile Bears won the 1947 Southern League Championship. After the 1961 season, the team was dissolved. Actor Chuck Connors was a former player for the Bears.

=== Mobile BaySharks ===
After 30 years, baseball returned to Mobile in the form of The Mobile BaySharks of the Texas-Louisiana League. The BaySharks played at Eddie Stanky Field at the University of South Alabama. This team played from 1994–1995. The team folded after the announcement was made that Southern League baseball was returning to Mobile.

=== Mobile BayBears ===
On April 17, 1997, baseball returned to Mobile in the new Hank Aaron Stadium. In just the 2nd year, the Mobile BayBears won the Southern League Championship over the Jacksonville Suns 3 games to 1. The BayBears were also named 1998 Minor League Team of the Year.

The BayBears were awarded their 2nd Southern League Championship in 2004 when the Southern League cancelled the Championship Series due to Hurricane Ivan. Both the BayBears and The Tennessee Smokies were named Co-Champions.

The Baybears were affiliated with the San Diego Padres from 1997–2006 seasons. Starting with the 2007 season, the Baybears were affiliated with the Arizona Diamondbacks.

== Basketball ==
=== Mobile Revelers ===
The Mobile Revelers of the NBA Development League (NBDL) played in the 2001–2002 and 2002–2003 seasons in the Mobile Civic Center. The Mobile Revelers won the NBDL Championship of the 2002–2003 season defeating the Fayetteville Patriots 2 games to 1. The team folded after the season suffering from very poor attendance. The name was originally used for a minor league soccer team based in Mobile.

=== Southern Alabama Bounce ===
The Southern Alabama Bounce of the ABA came to Mobile for 2006–07 as an expansion team that was announced on August 4, 2006. The team folded after one season.

=== Mobile Bay Hurricanes ===
The Mobile Bay Hurricanes played in the ABA 2010-2011 season. The team played its home games on the campus of Davidson High School.

== Football ==
=== Mobile Admirals ===
The Mobile Admirals played at Ladd–Peebles Stadium from April to June 1999, which was the only season for the ill-fated Regional Football League (RFL). The Admirals sold 6,000 season tickets, and finished the league's shortened season with a 6–2 record. In the playoffs, they defeated the Ohio Cannon and the Houston Outlaws to win the league championship. The Admirals' best-known player was Sherman Williams, formerly of the national champion 1992 Alabama Crimson Tide, and the Super Bowl XXX champion Dallas Cowboys. Williams earned $80,000 with the Admirals, and was named league MVP.

=== Mobile Seagulls ===
The Mobile Seagulls played two seasons in Mobile: the 2000 season in the Indoor Professional Football League (IPFL) in the Mobile Civic Center, and the 2001 season in the National Indoor Football League(NIFL) at the Mitchell Center. The team folded after the AFL2 announced it was coming to town.

The Mobile Seagulls were a professional indoor football team. They were initially a member of the Indoor Professional Football League for the 2000 season before joining the National Indoor Football League for the 2001 season, their final. They played their home games at Mobile Civic Center Arena for the 2000 season and at the Mitchell Center for the 2001 season.

The Seagulls were announced as an expansion franchise as part of the IPFL on February 10, 2000.[1] It was during this press conference that former Houston Oilers receiver Kenny Burrough was announced as the team's general manager and head coach.

On July 3, 2001, it was announced that the team was ceasing operations as a result of the approval of an af2 expansion team for Mobile. [2]

=== Mobile Tarpons ===
The Mobile Tarpons were members of the North American Football League in 1964 and 1965 playing their home games at Ladd Memorial Stadium (former home of the Senior Bowl). Each of the teams in the league had an affiliation with either an NFL or AFL team, and many former NFL stars played for various teams. One of the stars of the Tarpons was Hugh McInnis who holds the Minor League Football record for most catches in a season by a receiver. The Annapolis Sailors defeated the Tarpons in the championship game in 1965. Former Arizona QB John Torak led the Tarpons.

=== Mobile Wizards ===
The Mobile Wizards played in AFL2 during the 2002 season in the Mobile Civic Center. The Wizards failed to win one game, finishing 0–16. The Wizards were a very physical arena football team but never seemed to find a coach or an offensive strategy to win. Mobile native and Murphy High School Alumni, Lawrence Pendleton, played both offensive and defensive line the entire season in which many players came and went. Pendleton was the teams' leading defensive player.

=== Port City Monarchs ===
The Port City Monarchs are the NAFL football team in Mobile. Their rival is the Alabama Lightning based in Orange Beach in Baldwin County. In 2006, the Monarchs beat the Lightning to be crowned the best NAFL Gulf Coast team. This year every team in the Monarchs division made it to the playoffs. They were also beat by the Alabama Lighting.

=== Mobile Bay Tarpons ===
The Mobile Bay Tarpons played in the SIFL in 2011. The team played its home games on the campus of the University of South Alabama's Mitchell Center. The team became dormant after five games, finishing with a record of two wins and three losses.

== Hockey ==
=== Mobile Mysticks ===
The Mobile Mysticks played 7 seasons in the East Coast Hockey League (ECHL) from 1995–2002 in the Mobile Civic Center. The Mysticks averaged 33 wins per season and made the playoffs 5 out of 7 seasons. The team ceased operations for the 02–03 season, then began play as the Gwinnett Gladiators in the 03-04 Season. Jason Elders holds the record for most career goals in Mysticks history. Jason Elders was also the 1999 MVP of the ECHL All-Star game. Jason Clarke is the all-time PIM record holder in ECHL history. Dave Van Drunen played in one game in the NHL for the Ottawa Senators.

On September 17, 2025, it was announced that hockey would be coming back to Mobile in Fall 2027. The name for the team will be the Mobile Mysticks again, but with both updated and new logos. The team will play in the SPHL.

== College athletics ==
Mobile is represented in college athletics by the South Alabama Jaguars, a member of the NCAA Division I and Sun Belt Conference. Spring Hill College is a member of the NCAA Division II (Southern Intercollegiate Athletic Conference) and the University of Mobile is in the NAIA. South Alabama fielded a football team in 2009. South Alabama's men's basketball team has been to the NCAA Tournament seven times in its history.

NAIA tennis nationals for both men's and women's tennis are held in Mobile, which has the largest outdoor public tennis facility in the world, featuring over 50 tennis courts.

== Rugby ==
Spring Hill College's rugby team began playing in 1969 and continues to play today. In 1975 former Spring Hill players formed The Mobile Rugby Football Club and in 1978 began playing at Battleship Memorial Park and changed the name to Battleship Rugby Football Club. In 1992 Battleship won the Division II National Championship and in 2001 won the Division III National Championship. Battleship has also won 14 local league championships. Battleship hosts an annual tournament every November attracting teams from across the United States. Battleship has hosted teams from 7 foreign countries. Battleship currently fields a men's team in Division II and Battleship Old Boys, an over 35 years of age team that plays locally and abroad, posting an 8 – 1 record in Ireland, Argentina and New Zealand.

== Soccer ==
=== Mobile Revelers ===
The Mobile Revelers were an American soccer team that played in USISL Pro League from 1995-1997.

=== AFC Mobile ===
AFC Mobile is an American soccer team that has played in the Gulf Coast Premier League from 2017-2019 and joined the National Premier Soccer League in 2020.

== See also ==
- Alabama Sports Hall of Fame
- History of Mobile, Alabama
- South Alabama Jaguars men's basketball
