= Halakilangi Muagututia =

American football player (born 1978)

No. 30
- Position: Defensive back

Personal information
- Born: June 28, 1978 (age 48); Bellflower, California, U.S.
- Listed height: 5 ft 11 in (1.80 m)
- Listed weight: 210 lb (95 kg)

Career information
- High school: Paramount (Paramount, California)
- College: Texas-El Paso
- NFL draft: 1998: undrafted

Career history
- Mobile Admirals (1999); Los Angeles Dragons (2000); Chicago Enforcers (2001); Mobile Wizards (2002); Chicago Rush (2003); Las Vegas Gladiators (2003)*; Central Valley Coyotes (2004); Hawaiian Islanders (2004); Central Valley Coyotes (2005)
- * Offseason or practice squad member only
- Stats at ArenaFan.com

Halakilangi Muagututia (born June 28, 1978) is an American former professional football defensive back who played in the Arena Football League (AFL) and XFL. He played college football at Mt. San Antonio College and the University of Texas at El Paso.

== Early life ==
Halakilangi Muagututia was born on June 28, 1978, in Bellflower, California. He attended Paramount High School in Paramount, California.

== College career ==
Muagututia first played college football for the Mt. SAC Mounties of Mt. San Antonio College.

Muagututia played for the UTEP Miners of the University of Texas at El Paso from 1996 to 1997. He earned first-team All-WAC Mountain Division honors in 1997.

== Professional career ==
Muagututia played for the Mobile Admirals of the short-lived Regional Football League in 1999.

Muagututia played for the Los Angeles Dragons of the short-lived Spring Football League in 2000.

Muagututia was selected by the Chicago Enforcers of the XFL with the 441st pick in the XFL draft and played in four games for them in 2001.

Muagututia played for the Mobile Wizards of the af2 in 2002.

Muagututia was signed by the AFL's Chicago Rush on November 14, 2002. He was released by the Rush on March 31, 2003.

Muagututia was signed to the practice squad of the Las Vegas Gladiators of the AFL on April 23, 2003.

Muagututia played in nine games for the Central Valley Coyotes of the af2 during the 2004 season, recording 27 tackles. He asked for, and was granted, his release from the Coyotes in June 2004 due to feeling he could play at a higher level if he switched teams.

Muagututia was signed by the Hawaiian Islanders of the af2 in June 2004.

Muagututia played for the af2's Central Valley Coyotes in 2005.

== Personal life ==
Muagututia's son, Halakilangi Muagututia Jr., is a long snapper at UCLA.
