= Dan Lounsbury =

American football coach

Biographical details
- Born: c. 1946 or 1947 (age 78–79) or c. 1952 or 1953 (age 73–74); Watertown, New York, U.S.
- Education: University of Arkansas (1974)

Playing career
- c. late 1970s: Arkansas
- Position: Quarterback

Coaching career (HC unless noted)
- 1976–1977: Sam Houston State (QB/WR)
- 1978: Howard Payne (OC/QB/WR)
- 1979: East Texas State (QB/WR)
- 1980–1982: Southeastern Oklahoma State (OC/QB/WR)
- 1983–1985: Southeastern Oklahoma State
- 1986: Texas (TE/OT)
- 1987–1990: Purdue (RB/WR)
- 1991 (spring): New York/New Jersey Knights (ST/WR)
- 1991–1992: Wisconsin–Superior
- 1993: Toronto Argonauts (QB/WR)
- 1994–1996: Houston (QB)
- 1997–1998: Houston (AHC/OC/QB)
- 1999 (spring): Shreveport Knights (OC/QB)
- 2000: Kentucky (ST/TE)
- 2001: TCU (QB)
- 2002: Tulsa (OC/QB)
- 2003: Cortland (OC/QB)
- 2004–2007: Cortland (OC/QB)
- 2008: Southeast Missouri State (OA)
- 2009–?: Texas A&M–Commerce (OC)
- 2014: Arkansas Tech (OC)

Head coaching record
- Overall: 11–31–1

Daniel Lounsbury is an American former college football coach. He was the head football coach for Southeastern Oklahoma State University from 1983 and 1985 and the University of Wisconsin–Superior from 1991 to 1992. He also coached for Sam Houston State, Howard Payne, East Texas State, Texas, Purdue, Houston, Kentucky, TCU, Tulsa, Cortland, Southeast Missouri State, Arkansas Tech, the New York/New Jersey Knights of the World League of American Football (WLAF), the Toronto Argonauts of the Canadian Football League (CFL), and the Shreveport Knights of the Regional Football League (RFL). He played college football for Arkansas as a quarterback.

== Head coaching record ==
Year	Team	Overall	Conference	Standing	Bowl/playoffs
Southeastern Oklahoma State Savage Storm (Oklahoma Intercollegiate Conference) (1983–1985)
1983	Southeastern Oklahoma State	1–9	0–4	5th	
1984	Southeastern Oklahoma State	2–9	0–4	5th	
1985	Southeastern Oklahoma State	5–6	1–3	T–4th	
Southeastern Oklahoma State:		8–24	1–11		
Wisconsin–Superior Yellowjackets (Wisconsin State University Athletic Conference) (1991–1992)
1991	Wisconsin–Superior	2–6–1	1–6–1	T–8th	
1992	Wisconsin–Superior	1–1	0–0	N/A	
Wisconsin–Superior:		3–7–1	1–6–1		
Total:		11–31–1			
