= Josh LaRocca =

American football player (born 1973)

No. 7, 9
- Position: Quarterback

Personal information
- Born: March 9, 1973 (age 53)
- Listed height: 6 ft 2 in (1.88 m)
- Listed weight: 215 lb (98 kg)

Career information
- High school: Tom C. Clark (San Antonio, Texas)
- College: Rice (1991–1995)
- NFL draft: 1996: undrafted

Career history
- Denver Broncos (1996–1998)*; → Rhein Fire (1997); → England Monarchs (1998); Dallas Cowboys (1998)*; Houston Outlaws (1999)
- * Offseason or practice squad member only

Josh LaRocca (born March 9, 1973) is an American former football player. A quarterback, he played college football for the Rice Owls from 1991 to 1995, starting games in four of those seasons. In 1994, he helped Rice break a 28-game losing streak against the Texas Longhorns. After going unselected in the 1996 NFL draft, he was signed and released by the Denver Broncos in three straight offseasons from 1996 to 1998. LaRocca played two years in NFL Europe; in 1997 as a backup for the Rhein Fire and in 1998 as the starter for the England Monarchs. He spent the 1998 preseason with the Dallas Cowboys. LaRocca ended his football career by leading the Houston Outlaws of the Regional Football League (RFL) to the league title game. He worked in real estate after his football career.

== Early life ==
Josh LaRocca was born on March 9, 1973. He played high school football at Tom C. Clark High School in San Antonio, Texas, as an option quarterback. He was a two-year starter, and was only the second player in school history to be the starting quarterback for more than a season. LaRocca helped Clark High reach the regional semifinals as a junior in 1989 while throwing for 874 yards and ten touchdowns. He earned all-city honors in 1990 after passing for 1,194 yards, 14 touchdowns, and three interceptions while leading the team to the area round of the postseason. In January 1991, he committed to Rice University to play college football for the Rice Owls. He had also planned visits to Texas Tech and Navy but cancelled those trips after committing to Rice. LaRocca played baseball in high school as a second baseman, and was named first-team all-district as a senior. He graduated from Clark High in 1991.

== College career ==
As a true freshman, the Owls were considering redshirting LaRocca. However, before the start of the 1991 season, he earned the second-string quarterback job over Randall Schultz. LaRocca began the season as the backup to Greg Willing but started four games later in the year after Willing was benched. LaRocca appeared in nine games overall in 1991, completing 54 of 108 passes (50.0%) for 664 yards, four touchdowns, and nine interceptions while also rushing for 148 yards and five touchdowns.

LaRocca began the 1992 season as the starter but suffered a season-ending broken collarbone in the second game. He took a medical redshirt and was replaced by Bert Emanuel at quarterback. LaRocca served as the backup to Emanuel in 1993. LaRocca played in nine games overall during the 1993 season, recording 35 completions on 56 passing attempts (62.5%) for 354 yards, four touchdowns, and three interceptions. He also scored a rushing touchdown.

In 1994, after the graduation of Emanuel, LaRocca took over as the primary starter. New head coach Ken Hatfield converted LaRocca from a pocket passer to an option quarterback. On October 16, 1994, in a nationally televised game on ESPN, LaRocca completed three of seven passes for 45 yards and two touchdowns to help Rice upset No. 12 Texas by a score of 19–17. This broke Rice's 28-game losing streak to Texas, and was Rice's first win against Texas since 1965. Rice's 28-year losing streak against Texas was the second-longest active streak in Division I college football at the time among teams that played each other every year; only Navy's 30-year losing streak to Notre Dame was longer. LaRocca missed the final two games of the year due to injury. Overall in 1994, he completed 65 of 130 passes (50.0%) for 806 yards, 9 touchdowns, and eight interceptions while running for 323 yards and two touchdowns.

LaRocca returned as starter for the 1995 season, completing 59 of 118 passes (50.0%) for 807 yards, four touchdowns, and four interceptions. On October 28, 1995, he suffered another season-ending injury. LaRocca finished his college career with totals of 230 completions on 450 attempts (51.1%) for 2,876 yards, 23 touchdowns, 25 interceptions, 704 rushing yards, and nine rushing touchdowns. He earned Academic All-Southwest Conference honors in both 1994 and 1995. He graduated from Rice in 1996 with a bachelor's degree in political science.

== Professional career ==
LaRocca went undrafted in the 1996 NFL draft. On July 10, 1996, he signed with the Denver Broncos. However, he was only given a few reps at camp and was released soon after on July 23, 1996. LaRocca re-signed with the Broncos on January 21, 1997. In February 1997, the Broncos allocated him to the World League of American Football (WLAF) to play for the Rhein Fire. LaRocca served as the backup to T. J. Rubley during the 1997 WLAF season. LaRocca was released by Denver on May 8, 1997, but stayed on as a member of the Fire. Overall in 1997, he completed 16 of 31 passes (51.6%) for 235 yards, one touchdown, and three interceptions in 1997 as the Fire advanced to World Bowl '97. Afterward, LaRocca started working for a real estate company.

On February 19, 1998, LaRocca signed with the Broncos for the third time. He was allocated to NFL Europe to play for the England Monarchs. He began the 1998 NFL Europe season as the backup to Wally Richardson, but took over as starter after Richardson was benched during the first game. LaRocca was released by the Broncos on May 28, 1998, but stayed with the Monarchs. He played in all ten games, starting nine, for the Monarchs, completing 122 of 257 passes (47.5%) for 1,641 yards, 14 touchdowns, and 11 interceptions while also rushing for 77 yards. England finished the year with a 3–7 record. LaRocca made less than $20,000 for his season with the Monarchs. LaRocca returned to his real estate job after the NFL Europe season ended.

LaRocca signed with the Dallas Cowboys on July 27, 1998, after the team released quarterback Max Knake. Cowboys head coach Chan Gailey said, "Josh LaRocca is a guy that our scouts had followed very closely through the last few years. We felt good about him and he was available and we felt like he was a guy we wanted to take a look at this time. We felt like we needed to make a change and look at somebody else." LaRocca competed with Dan Gonzalez for the Cowboys' third-string quarterback job. LaRocca was released on August 24, 1998.

LaRocca was the starting quarterback for the Houston Outlaws of the Regional Football League (RFL) in 1999. He led the team to the first (and only) RFL Bowl, where they lost to the Mobile Admirals by a score of 14–12. The RFL folded after the season.

== Personal life ==
After his football career, LaRocca continued to work in real estate. He has worked as a managing director with Studley, Inc., a managing partner at Mohr Partners, and a principal with Avison Young. He also co-founded Blackstone Partners.
