= Thad Busby =

American football player (born 1974)

No. 17
- Position: Quarterback

Personal information
- Born: November 25, 1974 (age 51); Pace, Florida, U.S.
- Listed height: 6 ft 2 in (1.88 m)
- Listed weight: 219 lb (99 kg)

Career information
- High school: Pace
- College: Florida State
- NFL draft: 1998: undrafted

Career history
- San Francisco 49ers (1998)*; Mobile Admirals (1999); Cleveland Browns (1999)*; Tampa Bay Storm (2000)
- * Offseason or practice squad member only

Awards and highlights
- National champion (1993); ACC Offensive Player of the Year (1997); First-team All-ACC (1997); Second-team All-ACC (1996)

Career AFL statistics
- Passing TDs–INTs: 7–4
- Passing yards: 604
- Stats at ArenaFan.com

Thad Busby (born November 25, 1974) is an American former professional football player. He played college football for the Florida State Seminoles and played professionally in the Regional Football League (RFL) and Arena Football League (AFL).

== Early life and education ==
Busby attended Pace High School in Pace, Florida, and was then drafted by the Toronto Blue Jays in the fourth round of the 1993 Major League Baseball draft, but did not sign. He attended Florida State University, where he played both football and baseball and compiled a 19–2 record as the Seminoles' starting quarterback in 1996–97.

== Career ==
After his college career, he was also a member of the San Francisco 49ers and Cleveland Browns of the National Football League (NFL), but did not make a regular season roster. He did play in the short-lived Regional Football League in 1999 for the Mobile Admirals, and in the Arena Football League for the Tampa Bay Storm in 2000.
