= Major Harris (American football) =

American gridiron football player (born 1968)

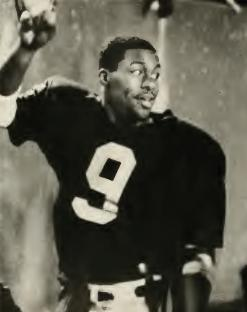
- Harris in The Monticola, WVU yearbook, 1992

No. 9
- Position: Quarterback

Personal information
- Born: February 6, 1968 (age 58); Pittsburgh, Pennsylvania, U.S.
- Listed height: 6 ft 1 in (1.85 m)
- Listed weight: 205 lb (93 kg)

Career information
- High school: Brashear (Pittsburgh)
- College: West Virginia
- NFL draft: 1990: 12th round, 317th overall pick

Career history
- Los Angeles Raiders (1990)*; BC Lions (1990); Columbus/Cleveland Thunderbolts (1991–1994); Washington Marauders (1992)*; West Virginia Lightning/Huntington Hawks (1994–1996); Ohio Cannon (1999); Southern Michigan Timberwolves (1999–2000); Charleston Swamp Foxes (2003)
- * Offseason or practice squad member only

Awards and highlights
- First-team All-American (1989); Third-team All-American (1988); 2× ECAC Player of the Year (1988, 1989); 2× First-team All-East (1988, 1989); West Virginia Mountaineers No. 9 retired

Career CFL statistics
- Comp. / Att.: 18 / 42
- Passing yards: 300
- TD–INT: 3–3

Career AFL statistics
- Comp. / Att.: 186 / 390
- Passing yards: 2,159
- TD–INT: 29–21
- Passer rating: 61.05
- Rushing TD: 23
- Stats at ArenaFan.com
- College Football Hall of Fame

Major C. Harris (born February 6, 1968) is an American former college football player who was a quarterback for the West Virginia Mountaineers during the 1980s. Harris was a first-team All-American in 1989 and finished fifth and third in the Heisman Trophy voting in 1988 and 1989, respectively. He was also the Eastern College Athletic Conference (ECAC) Player of the Year in 1988 and 1989. Harris was inducted into the College Football Hall of Fame in 2009.

Harris played professionally in the Canadian Football League (CFL) and Arena Football League (AFL). He is now an assistant wide receivers coach for North Hills High School in Pittsburgh.

== Early life ==
Major C. Harris was born on February 6, 1968, in Pittsburgh, Pennsylvania. He played football at Brashear High School in Pittsburgh, Pennsylvania (he would later be called the Brashear Bullet by West Virginia announcer Jack Fleming).

As a senior, Harris threw a game-winning, 79-yard touchdown pass on the last play of the game against Indiana High School. Harris was named Pittsburgh's high school football player of the year after his junior and senior seasons by the Pittsburgh Post-Gazette, and was a Sporting News Top 100 prospect following his final season.

== College career ==
=== Freshman (1987) ===
Harris took an offer at West Virginia, where coach Don Nehlen was trying to rebuild the quarterback position. Nehlen set up a football camp for two-hand touch football and stated, "The kids couldn't touch him."

Nehlen signed Florida prep quarterback Browning Nagle along with Harris and redshirted them for the season. Harris and Nagle battled it out in spring practice and Harris eventually won the job, so Nagle transferred to University of Louisville.

Harris struggled at first, but when the fifth game came around at East Carolina University, Harris stood out and ended West Virginia's season with a bid to the Sun Bowl against Oklahoma State University. West Virginia lost, but Harris rushed for over 100 yards. That season, Harris threw for 1,200 yards and 10 touchdowns on only 77 completions. Harris also rushed for 615 yards and 6 touchdowns.

=== Sophomore (1988) ===
The following season, he directed West Virginia to the school's first-ever undefeated, untied regular season and a matchup against No. 1 ranked Notre Dame in the Fiesta Bowl for the national championship. In getting the Mountaineers to the Fiesta Bowl, Harris baffled opponents all season with his daring, unpredictable, wide-open style. Against Boston College, Harris recorded a career-high 297 passing yards. Harris's dazzling play was never more evident than in West Virginia's 51–30 dismantling of long-time nemesis Penn State. Harris outgained the entire Penn State team, 301 to 292, and produced the school's most exciting run ever in the first quarter of that game. That run and several more like it helped him finish fifth in the Heisman Trophy race that year and earn ECAC player of the year honors. His season passing totals were 1,915 yards and 14 touchdowns, while he rushed for 610 yards and 6 touchdowns. He had the highest passing-efficiency rating of any college quarterback during the season, and totaled 2,348 total yards of offense and averaging 8.4 yards per touch. As the Mountaineers traveled to their first ever National Championship game, the Irish were favored. But on the third play of the game, Major Harris was hit and separated his shoulder. Harris stayed in the game, but didn't throw the ball often, scrambling instead. West Virginia never threatened Notre Dame's lead, and the Fighting Irish won, 34–21.

==== "The Play" ====
Against Penn State in 1988, as the play clock wound down, Harris forgot the play he had called in the huddle. As soon as the ball was snapped, the entire West Virginia team went in one direction and Harris went the other. He faked out the entire Penn State team leaving no fewer than seven tacklers grabbing air on the way to a touchdown—and one of the more memorable plays in WVU history. The Mountaineers won the game, 51–30.

Harris's coach, Don Nehlen, said of the run, "I had called 37 and he ran 36. Everybody else on our offense went one way, and Major went the other. He literally ran through the Penn State defense for a touchdown of about 30 yards. After he scored, Major came to the sideline and apologized. He said, "My fault, Coach." People still ask me about that play all of the time...If there was a contest for most exciting player, Major would win it hands down."

=== Junior (1989) ===
As a junior in 1989, Harris was equally spectacular despite not having as strong a supporting cast. Harris still led WVU to a 8-2-1 season. Against Rutgers during the season, Harris had a career-high 163 rushing yards. He finished third in the 1989 Heisman Trophy balloting on the season, earned first team Kodak All-America honors and was a second team AP and Football News All American. Like 1988, Harris was again voted ECAC player of the year. That year, Harris led the Mountaineers to a Gator Bowl game, but they lost to Clemson, 27–7. Harris threw for 2,058 yards and 17 touchdowns on the season, along with 936 and 6 touchdowns rushing. Harris set school records that season for most total offense and quarterback rushing yards. Both records, however, have since been broken.

=== Legacy ===
Harris established a WVU record with 7,334 total yards (ranks #7 through 2018 season), and became the first of just a handful of quarterbacks in Division I history to pass for more than 5,000 yards and rush for more than 2,000 yards in a career. His 2,161 rushing yards rank 17th (through 2021 season) on the school's all-time rushing list. Harris's longest pass of his career was 70 yards and his longest run was 75 yards.

Harris was selected for the 2009 College Football Hall of Fame induction class.

In 2021, West Virginia University retired Major's #9 jersey.

== Professional career ==
=== NFL and CFL ===
After the completion of his junior year, Harris decided to leave school early and was drafted in the 12th round by the Los Angeles Raiders in the 1990 NFL draft. However, Harris instead chose to sign with the BC Lions of the Canadian Football League in May 1990. He spent the 1990 season backing up quarterbacks Doug Flutie and Joe Paopao. In limited duty, Harris completed 18 of 42 passes for 300 yards, with three touchdowns and three interceptions. He also rushed for 145 yards and three scores.

=== Arena Football League ===
Harris then spent three years in the Arena Football League (1991–1992, 1994) where his 429 rushing yards in his first season of 1991 stood as the single-season league record until Michael Bishop ran for 459 yards in 2005. In 1991, Harris also passed for 940 yards, with nine touchdowns and nine interceptions. The next season, he passed for 837 yards, 12 touchdowns and nine interceptions. Harris finished his third season in Arena Football with 382 yards passing and eight touchdowns in 1994. Harris's Arena Football League career statistics include 2,159 yards and 29 touchdowns passing and 837 yards and 23 touchdowns rushing.

=== Minor league football ===
Harris signed with the Washington Marauders of the Professional Spring Football League in January 1992, but the league folded before the season began. He played for the West Virginia Lightning and the Huntington Hawks in the National Minor Football League (NMFL) from 1994 to 1996. The West Virginia Lightning won the NMFL Championship under Harris's command. The NMFL consisted of teams in the eastern United States from Texas to Maine.

Harris also played for the Ohio Cannon of the short-lived Regional Football League in 1999, and the Southern Michigan Timberwolves in the Mid-Continental Football League (MCFL) in Monroe, Michigan, for the 1999 and 2000 seasons. He later played for the Charleston Swamp Foxes of AF2 in 2003.
