= Muagututia =

Muagututia is a surname. Notable people with the surname include:

- Faauuga Muagututia (born 1958), American Samoan bobsledder
- Garrett Muagututia (born 1988), American volleyball player
- Halakilangi Muagututia (born 1978), American football player
- Richard Muagututia (born 1988), Samoan rugby union player
