= Tad Gormley Stadium =

Sports stadium in New Orleans, United States

Coordinates: 29°59′22″N 90°5′58″W

- Tad Gormley
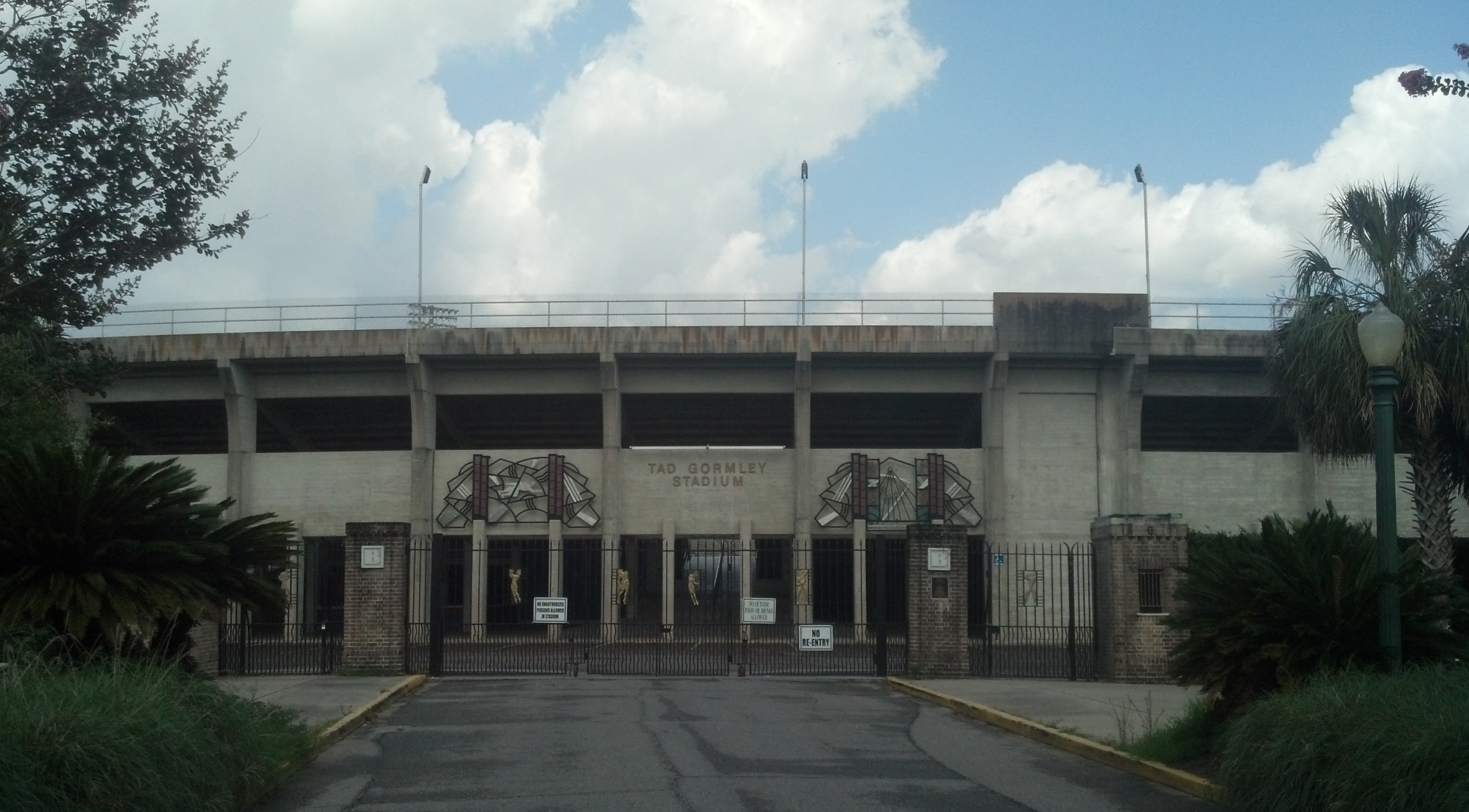
- Tad Gormley Stadium in July 2013
- Interactive map of Tad Gormley Stadium
- Former names: City Park Stadium (1937–1956)
- Location: City Park, New Orleans
- Owner: New Orleans City Park
- Operator: New Orleans City Park
- Capacity: 26,500
- Surface: GameDay Grass from AstroTurf

Construction
- Groundbreaking: 1935
- Opened: 1937
- Renovated: 2006
- Cost: $560,000 (1937)
- Architects: Richard Koch and the firm of Weiss, Dreyfous and Seifert

Tenants
- LHSAA (football/soccer/track and field) (1937–present); New Orleans Pelicans (baseball) (1958–1959); Dillard Bleu Devils and Lady Bleu Devils (track and field); Loyola Wolf Pack (track and field); LSU New Orleans Privateers (track and field); Tulane Green Wave (track and field); Xavier Gold Rush and Gold Nuggets (track and field); LSU New Orleans Privateers (football) (1965–1968, 2008–2011); New Orleans Riverboat Gamblers (USL A-League) (1996–1997); New Orleans Thunder (RFL) (1999); Tulane Green Wave (football) (2002–2004, 2008); New Orleans Blaze (WFA) (2002–2011); New Orleans Jesters (PDL) (2008); New Orleans Jazz F.C. (SFL) (2011)

Tad Gormley Stadium (originally City Park Stadium) is a 26,500 seat multi-purpose outdoor stadium, located in City Park, in New Orleans, Louisiana, United States.

The stadium is home to the LSU New Orleans Privateers men's and women's track and field teams. The Tulane University Green Wave men's and women's track and field teams also host track meets at the stadium. The Xavier University men's and women's track and field teams also use the stadium as its home venue. It is also frequently used for Louisiana High School Athletic Association football games, soccer matches and track and field meets.

The stadium features GameDay Grass MT from AstroTurf, a 400-meter all-weather track, three locker rooms, a press box seating 110, and press suite seating for 40.

== History ==
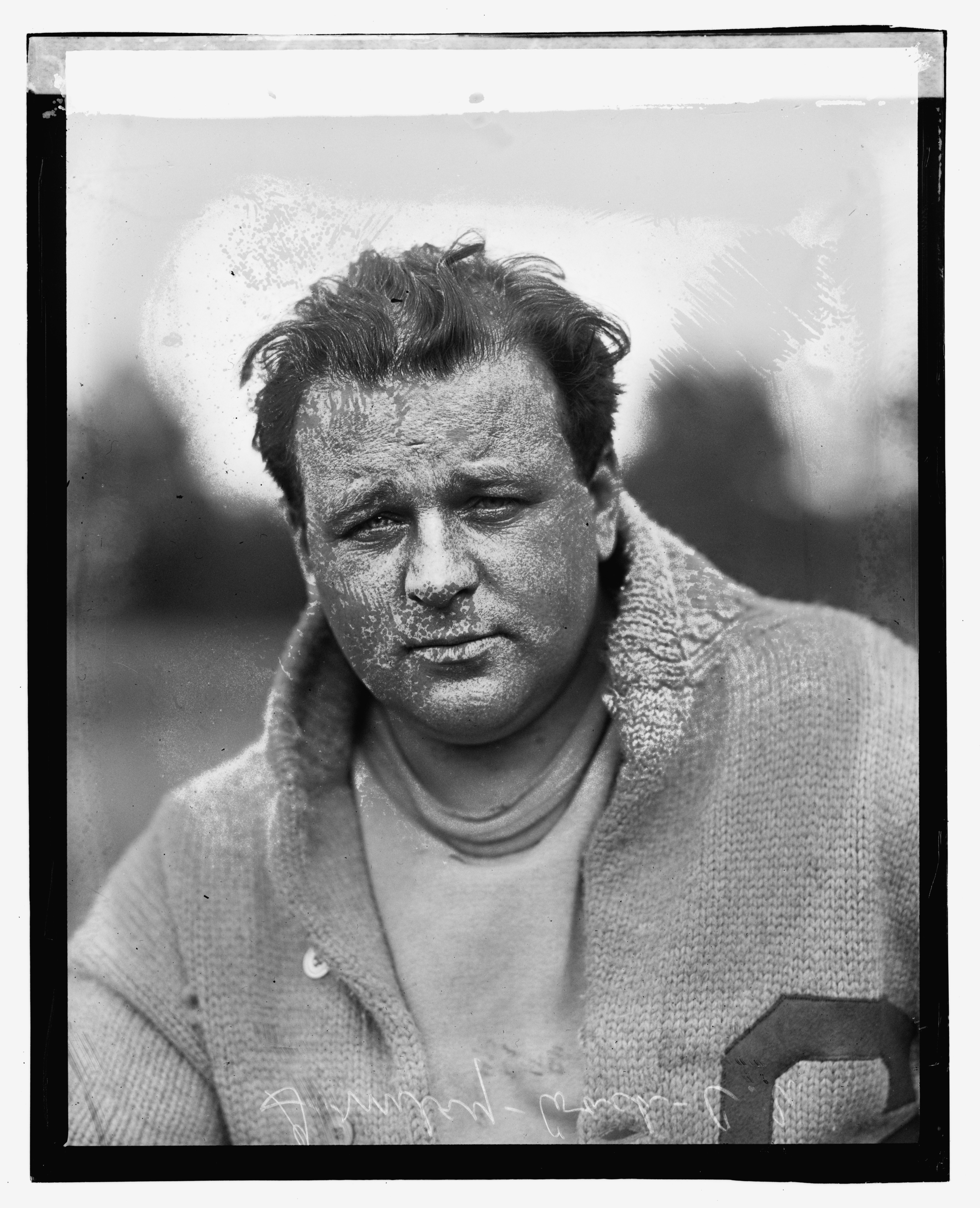
Tad Gormley

Tad Gormley Stadium was built by the Works Progress Administration (WPA) during the Great Depression and completed in 1937. It has been used for baseball, football, soccer, and track and field.

In 1957, the stadium was renamed Tad Gormley Stadium in honor of athletic trainer and coach Frank "Tad" Gormley.

In 2005, Hurricane Katrina flooded the stadium, along with parts of New Orleans. It remained structurally sound, but required major repairs to the electrical and plumbing systems along with the playing field. In 2006, running back Reggie Bush was drafted by the New Orleans Saints. He donated over $80,000 to repair the playing field. In acknowledgement of his generosity, Tad Gormley Stadium's playing field was renamed Reggie Bush Field.

== Sports ==
=== Football ===
In its early years, the stadium would host high school football games in front of sellout crowds with standing-room only crowds surrounding the playing field. The record for attendance was set in 1940 when 34,345 spectators attended a game between Jesuit High School of New Orleans and Holy Cross High School of New Orleans.

The stadium has also hosted Louisiana High School Athletic Association (LHSAA) state championship football games. The last Class AAAA championship game (largest classification until 1991) held in the stadium was on December 10, 1971 when Brother Martin High School defeated New Orleans Catholic League rival St. Augustine High School 23–0 in front of 25,000. The last title game in the facility was in 1975, when John Curtis High School defeated Notre Dame High School of Crowley 13–12 for the Class AA title.

The University of New Orleans Privateers' club football team played in the stadium from 1965 to 1968 and again from 2008 to 2011. The Tulane Green Wave football team played four homecoming games and one non-conference game at the stadium in 2002, 2003, 2004 and 2008.

After Hurricane Katrina, the first event held at the newly renovated stadium was an LHSAA high school prep-football game on September 21, 2006 pitting Brother Martin High School versus L. W. Higgins High School.

=== Baseball ===
The stadium was home to the New Orleans Pelicans (baseball) team from 1958 to 1959, after the closing of Pelican Stadium in 1957. On April 6, 1969, the New York Mets and Minnesota Twins played a doubleheader at the stadium.

=== Soccer ===
On March 28, 1982 the stadium hosted a World Cup tune-up match for the Honduras National Team against the Tampa Bay Rowdies of the North American Soccer League. The match ended in a 1–1 draw.

The New Orleans Riverboat Gamblers of the USL A-League played in the stadium from 1996 to 1997. On March 25, 2007, C.D. Olimpia played the New England Revolution in an international friendly at Gormley Stadium. In 2008, Tad Gormley hosted select New Orleans Shell Shockers (later renamed New Orleans Jesters) home soccer matches.

The stadium hosted another international friendly match on February 4, 2012 between Major League Soccer's Chicago Fire Soccer Club and Honduran soccer club Real C.D. España.

The U.S. Soccer Women's national team played the Brazil Women's national team at Tad Gormley Stadium on July 13, 2003 in New Orleans, Louisiana. The U.S. defeated Brazil 1-0.

=== Track and field ===
Tad Gormley played host to the 1992 U.S. Olympic Track and Field Trials for the 1992 Summer Olympic games held in Barcelona, Spain. The stadium hosted the 1998 USA Outdoor Track and Field Championships.

== Special events ==
=== Concerts ===
Tad Gormley Stadium has also hosted concerts by many famous artists, including Alice Cooper, The Beatles, Eric Clapton, Journey, Pearl Jam, Rage Against the Machine, Ramones, The Rolling Stones and ZZ Top among others.

== Gallery ==
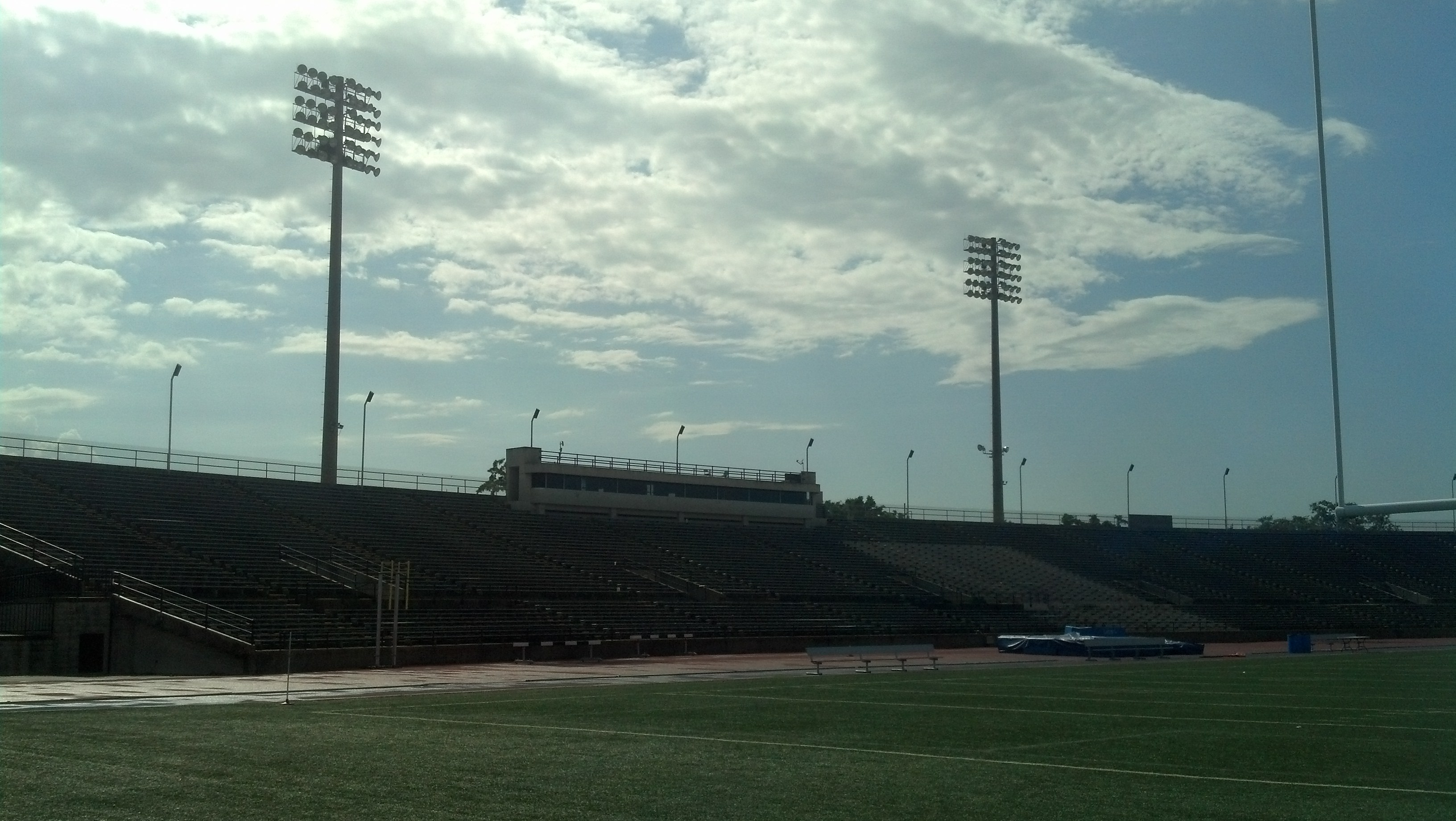
Tad Gormley Stadium - Home Grandstand

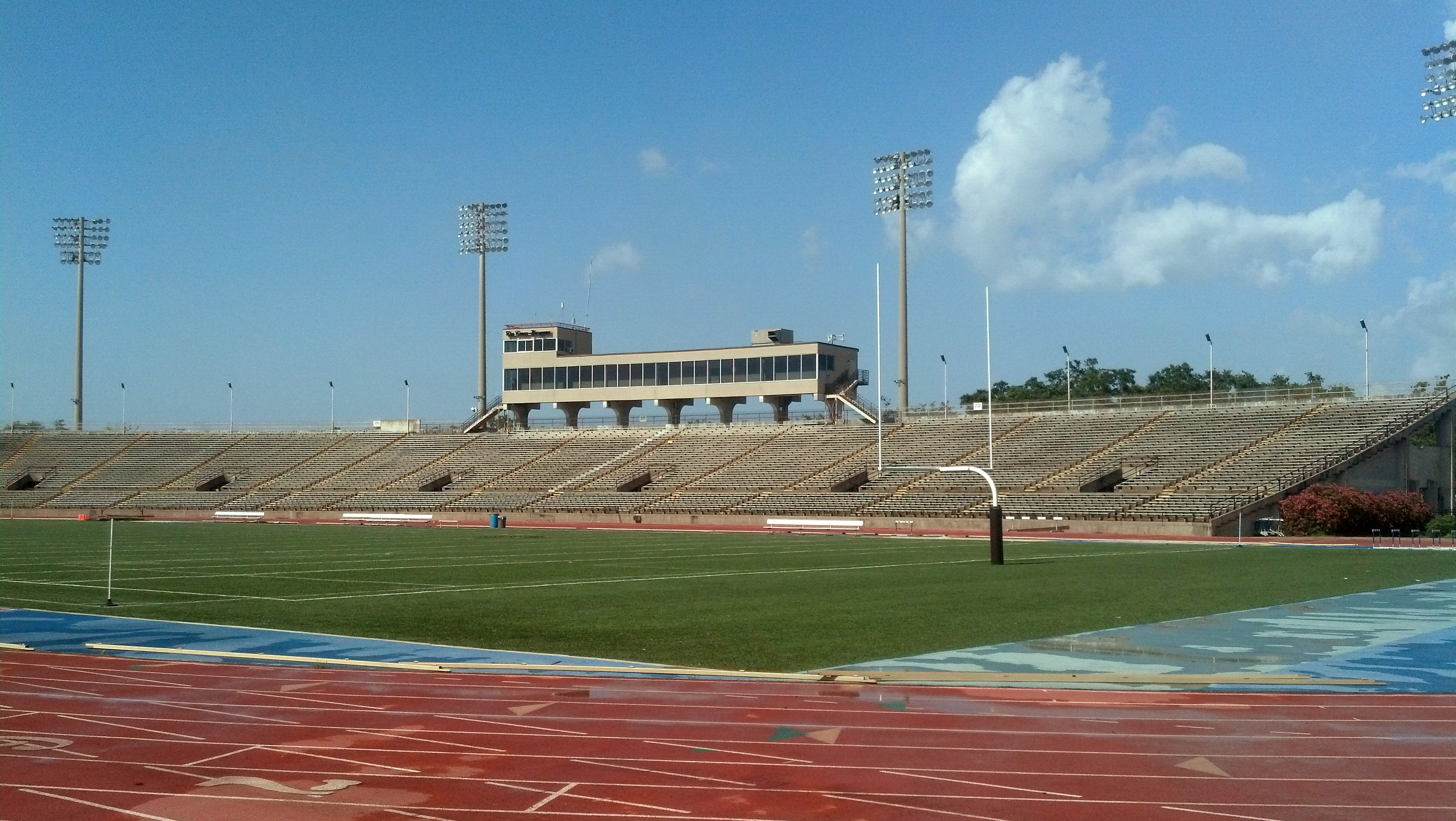
Tad Gormley Stadium - Away Grandstand

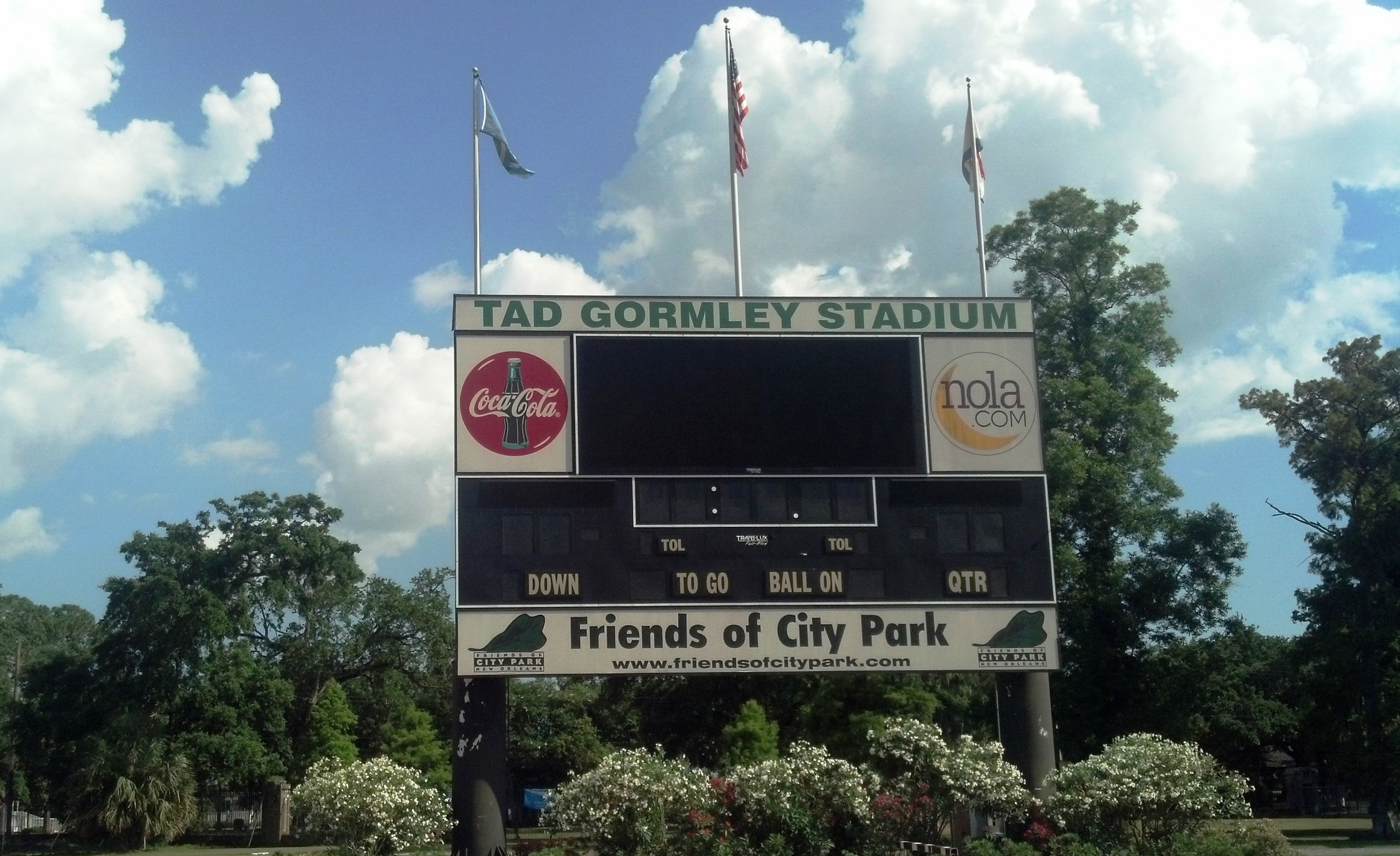
Tad Gormley Stadium - Scoreboard

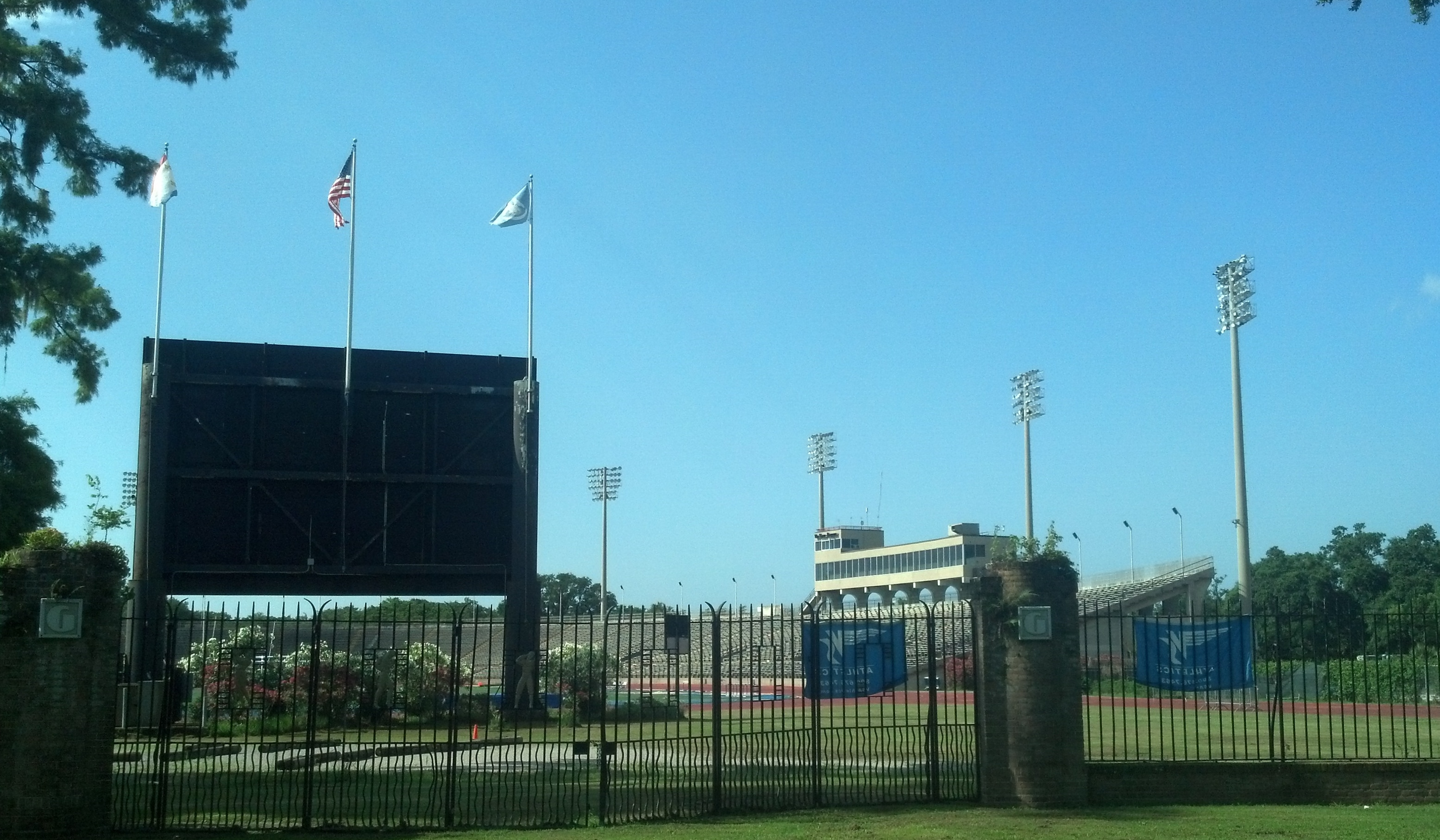
Tad Gormley Stadium - Endzone

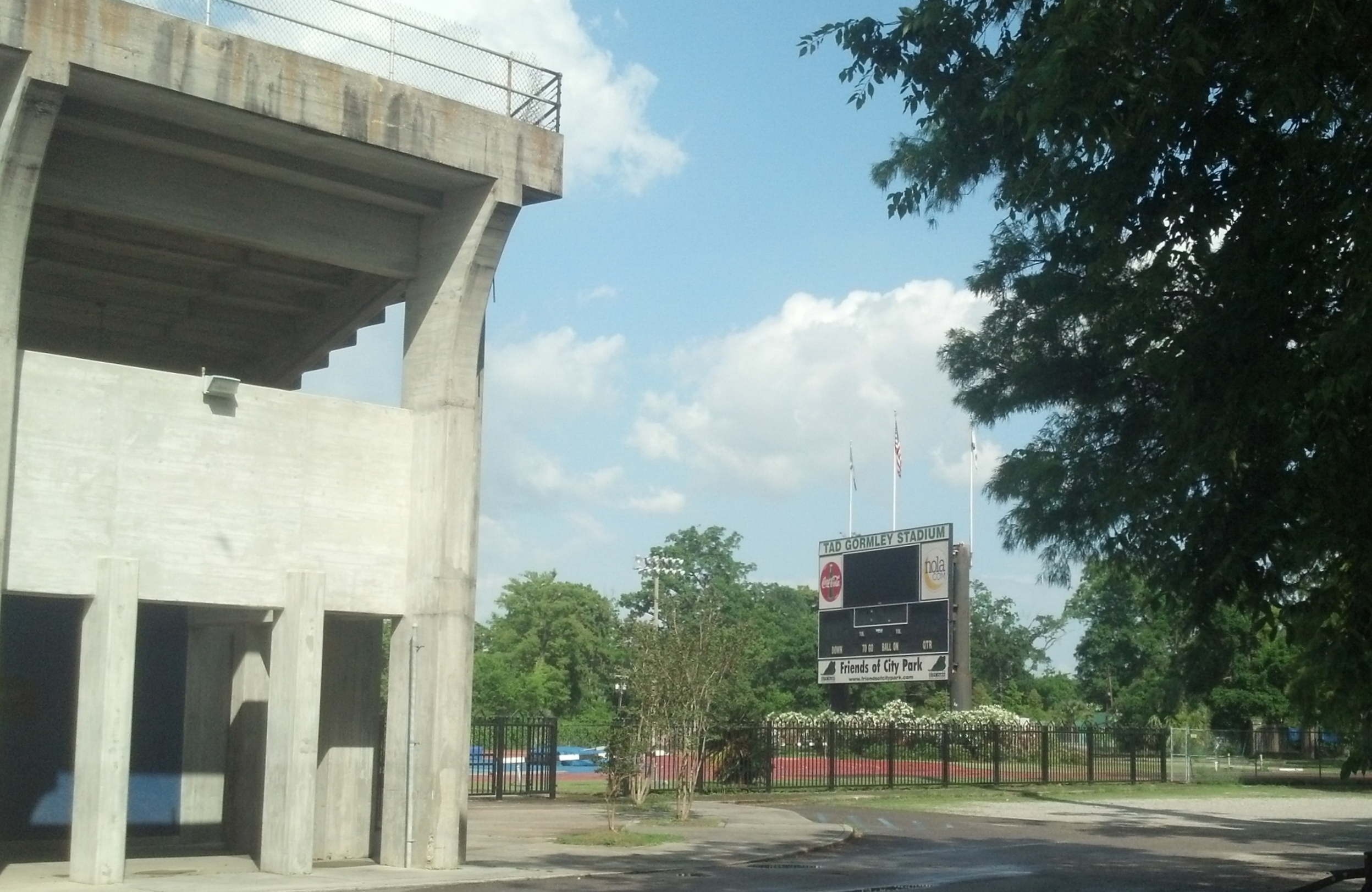
Tad Gormley Stadium - Endzone Scoreboard

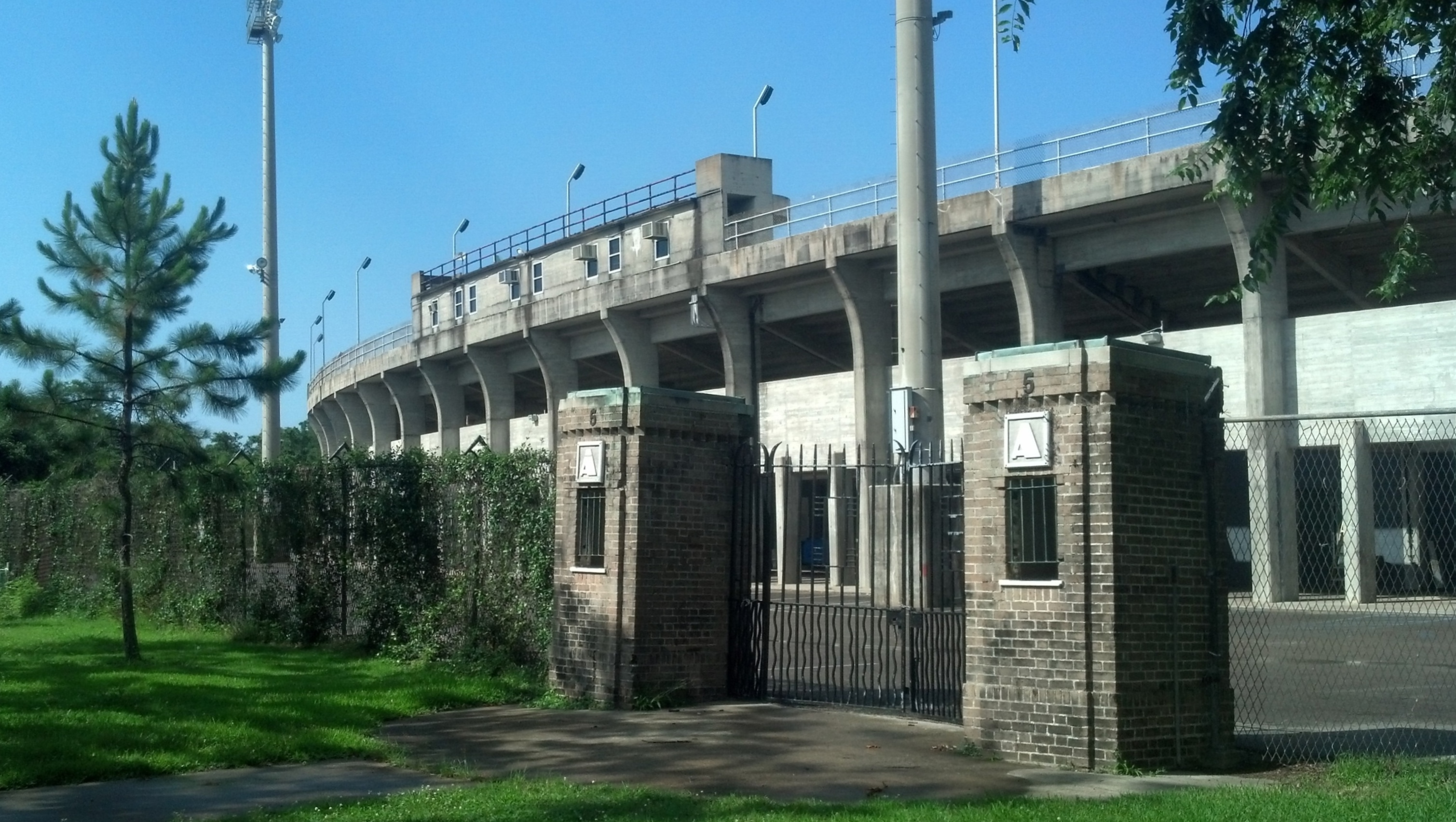
Tad Gormley Stadium - Home Grandstand Exterior

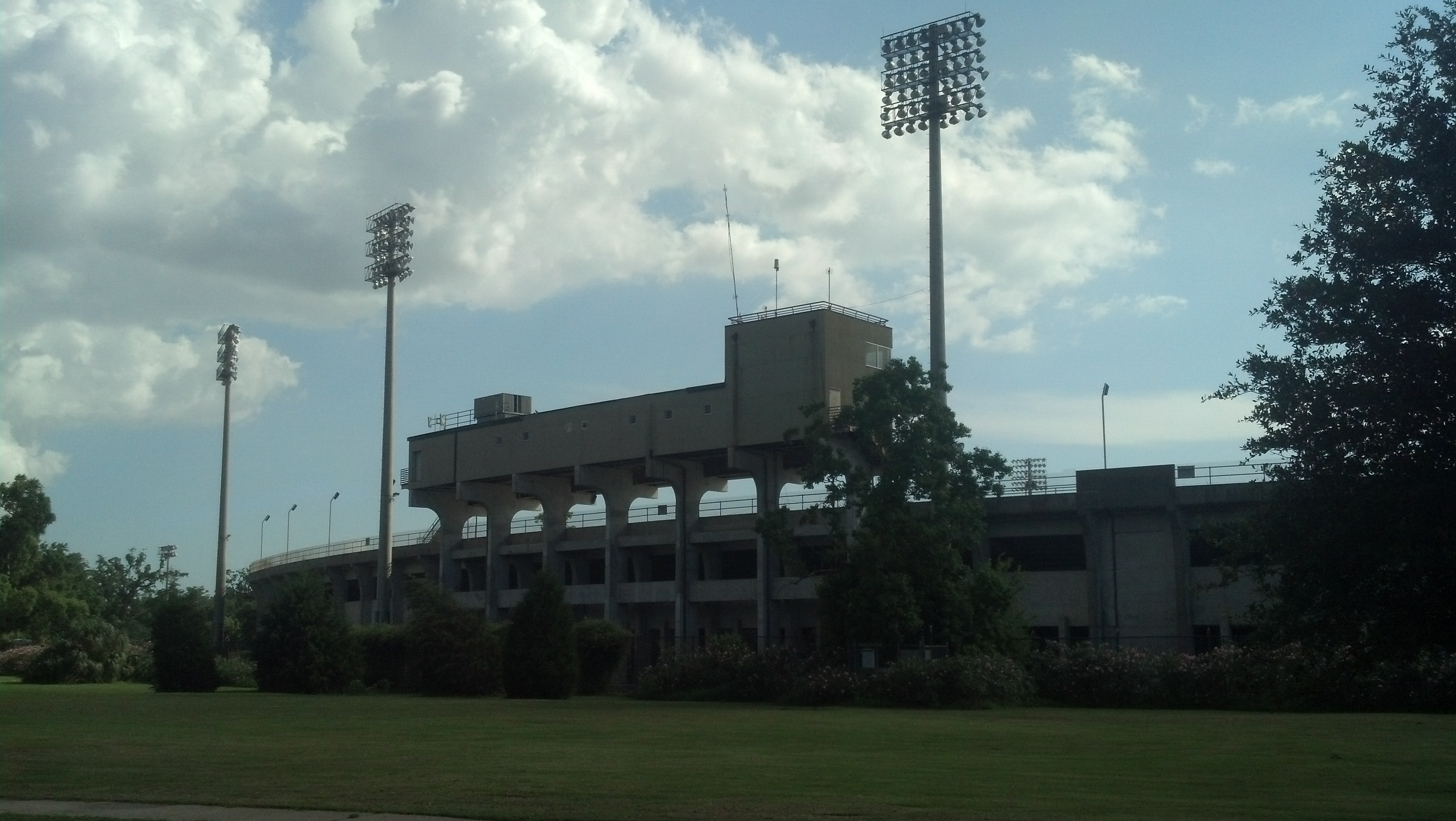
Tad Gormley Stadium - Away Grandstand Exterior

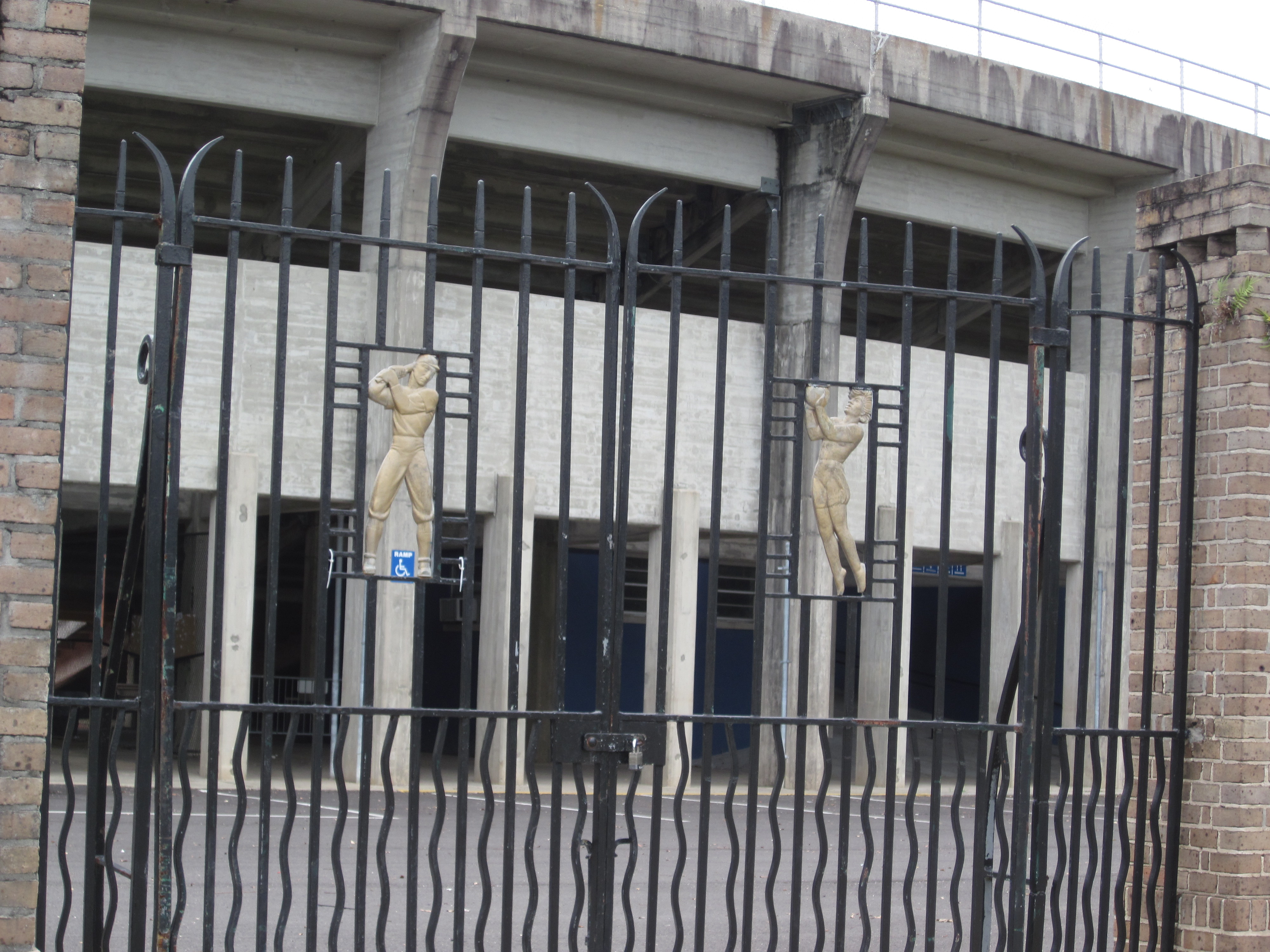
Tad Gormley Stadium - Gate L

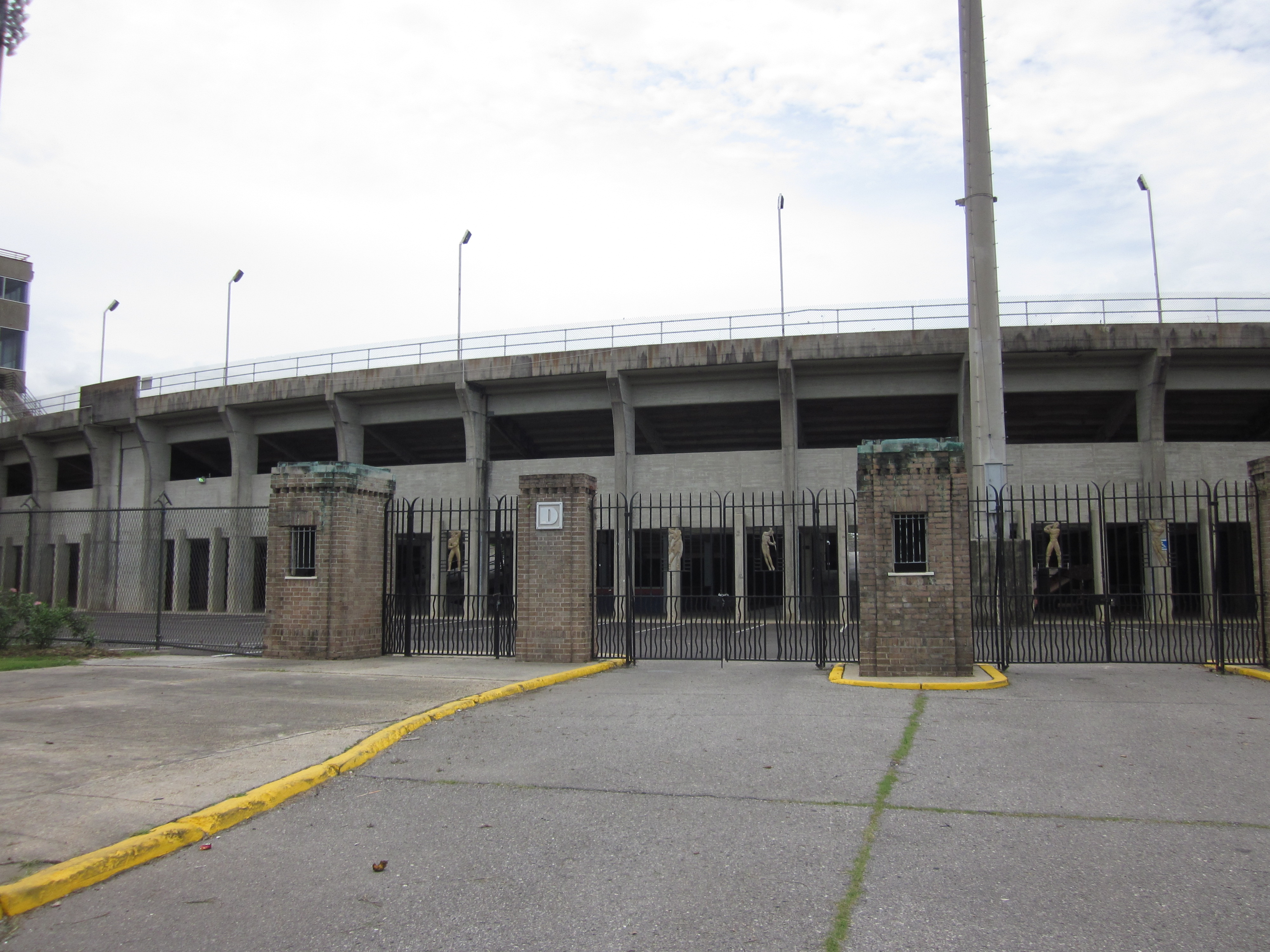
Tad Gormley Stadium - Gate I

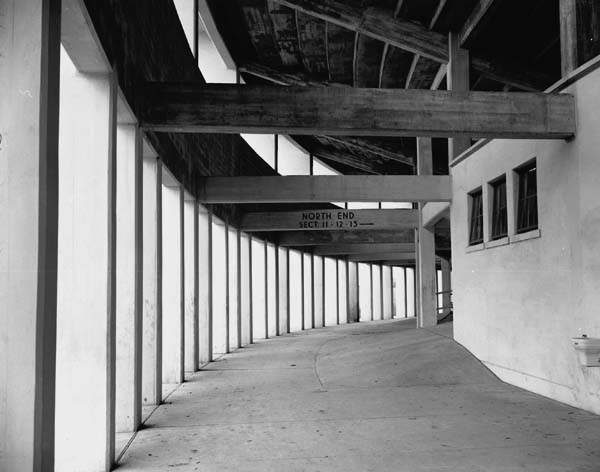
City Park Stadium North End Corridor - 1937

== See also ==
- City Park (New Orleans)
- Louisiana High School Athletic Association
- New Orleans Privateers
- New Orleans Pelicans (baseball)
- List of soccer stadiums in the United States
- List of music venues
