= Jason Martin (American football) =

American football player (born 1972)

No. 15
- Position: Quarterback

Personal information
- Born: December 12, 1972 (age 53); Delhi, Louisiana, U.S.
- Listed height: 6 ft 3 in (1.91 m)
- Listed weight: 225 lb (102 kg)

Career information
- High school: Oak Grove (Oak Grove, Louisiana)
- College: Louisiana Tech (1992–1996)
- NFL draft: 1997: undrafted

Career history
- Tampa Bay Buccaneers (1997)*; Barcelona Dragons (1998); Grand Rapids Rampage (1998); Shreveport Knights (1999); Grand Rapids Rampage (2000)
- * Offseason or practice squad member only

Career AFL statistics
- Comp. / Att.: 86 / 160
- Passing yards: 976
- TD–INT: 13–10
- QB rating: 66.56
- Rushing TDs: 2
- Stats at ArenaFan.com

Jason Martin (born December 12, 1972) is an American former football quarterback. He played college football at Louisiana Tech University, and signed with the Tampa Bay Buccaneers after going undrafted in the 1997 NFL draft. He played professionally for the Barcelona Dragons of NFL Europe, and the Grand Rapids Rampage of the Arena Football League (AFL).

== Early life ==
Jason Martin was born on December 12, 1972, in Delhi, Louisiana. He attended Oak Grove High School in Oak Grove, Louisiana.

== College career ==
Martin played college football for the Louisiana Tech Bulldogs of Louisiana Tech University. He was redshirted in 1992 and was a four-year letterman from 1993 to 1996. He split time with senior Aaron Ferguson in 1993, completing 92 of 193 passes (47.7%) for 1,218 yards, four touchdowns, and 12 interceptions while also rushing for a touchdown. Martin was then the team's primary starter from 1994 to 1996. In 1994, he recorded 160 completions on 342 attempts (46.8%) for 1,882 yards, four touchdowns, and 15 interceptions, and one rushing touchdown. He improved in 1995, completing 206 of 370 passes (55.7%) for 2,606 yards, 24 touchdowns, and 12 interceptions while also scoring one rushing touchdown. As a senior during the 1996 season, Martin completed 247 of 415 passes (59.5%) for 3,360 yards, 32 touchdowns, and 16 interceptions. His completions, attempts, passing yards, and passing touchdowns were the most among independents that year. He also broke Terry Bradshaw's 26-year single-season school passing record. Martin had an independent-leading 305.5 passing yards per game, and an independent-leading 145.3 passer rating as well.

== Professional career ==
Martin signed with the Tampa Bay Buccaneers on April 12, 1997, after going undrafted in the 1997 NFL draft. He was waived on August 18, 1997.

Martin signed with the Barcelona Dragons of NFL Europe in March 1998. He played for the Dragons during the 1998 NFL Europe season, completing 14 of 32 passes (43.8%) for 131 yards and two interceptions.

Martin then played in six games for the Grand Rapids Rampage of the Arena Football League (AFL) during the 1998 AFL season, completing 63 of 111 passes (56.8%) for 683 yards, nine touchdowns, and seven interceptions while also rushing for one touchdown.

He played for the Shreveport Knights of the short-lived Regional Football League in 1999.

Martin signed with the Rampage again on January 5, 2000. He was placed on refused to report on March 22 but was activated before the start of the season. He played in three games for the Rampage in 2000, totaling 23 completions on 49 passing attempts (46.9%) for 293 yards, four touchdowns, and three interceptions, and one rushing touchdown.
