= Pasadena Memorial Stadium =

Sports stadium in Pasadena, Texas

Veterans Memorial Stadium
- Interactive map of Veterans Memorial Stadium
- Full name: Veterans Memorial Stadium
- Address: 2906 Dabney Drive
- Location: Pasadena, Texas
- Coordinates: 29.669377°N 95.183208°W
- Owner: Pasadena Independent School District
- Capacity: 12,700

Construction
- Opened: 1965

Veterans Memorial Stadium, opened in 1965, is a 12,700-capacity stadium in Pasadena, Texas, owned by the Pasadena Independent School District.

The stadium hosts all of the varsity home football games for the district's five high schools and is also host to many Class 3A, 4A and 5A playoff games. The varsity high school soccer teams also play at Newcomb Field in the winter.

== History ==
In 1999, the stadium served as the home field for the Houston Outlaws of the short-lived Regional Football League.

In 2004, the football field at the stadium was dedicated in honor of retired coach and athletic director Bill Newcomb, who served Pasadena ISD for more than 40 years and was head football coach at South Houston High School from 1981 to 1987. He was also a standout player at Pasadena High School from 1953 to 1956.

In 2006, the district's board of trustees voted to change the name of the stadium to Pasadena Veterans Memorial Stadium, to honor those armed forces personnel who have sacrificed for their country.
