= Ray Woodard =

American football player and coach (born 1961)

Current position
- Title: Defensive coordinator
- Team: Madrid Bravos

Biographical details
- Born: August 20, 1961 (age 65); Corrigan, Texas, U.S.

Playing career
- 1980–1981: Kilgore
- 1982–1983: Texas
- 1984–1985: San Diego Chargers
- 1986–1987: Denver Broncos
- 1987–1988: Kansas City Chiefs
- Position: Defensive lineman

Coaching career (HC unless noted)
- 1988–1995: Kilgore (assistant)
- 1996: Texas Terror (assistant)
- 1997: Frankfurt Galaxy (DC/DL)
- 1999: Houston Outlaws
- 2000: Houston Marshals
- 2000–2003: Scottish Claymores (DC/LB)
- 2003–2004: Burton (TX) HS
- 2005–2006: Navarro (DC)
- 2007: Navarro
- 2008–2016: Lamar
- 2019–2020: Chester HS (TX)
- 2021: Groveton HS (TX) (assistant)
- 2024–present: Madrid Bravos (DC)

Head coaching record
- Overall: 34–46 (college); 9–3 (junior college)
- Bowls: 1–0 (junior college)
- Tournaments: 2–0 (SWJCFC playoffs)

Accomplishments and honors

Championships
- 1 SWJCFC (2007)

Ray Woodard (born August 20, 1961) is an American football coach and former player. He is the defensive coordinator for the Madrid Bravos of the European League of Football (ELF). Woodward was the head football coach of the Lamar Cardinals football from 2008 to 2016. He spent four seasons in the National Football League (NFL) with the San Diego Chargers, Denver Broncos, and Kansas City Chiefs, during which he played in nine games all during the strike-shortened 1987 season. He played three games as a "scab" for Denver, the year they went to Super Bowl XXII, but he was ineligible to share in the bonus as he resigned with the Chiefs. Woodard played college football at Kilgore College and the University of Texas at Austin.

== College career ==
Woodard played college football at Kilgore College and the University of Texas at Austin. He helped Kilgore win the Southwest Junior College Football Conference (SWJCFC) championship in his freshman year and Texas to win the Southwest Conference (SWC) championship in his senior year.

== Professional playing career ==
Woodard was selected 199th overall in the 1984 NFL draft by the San Diego Chargers. He spent the 1984 season on the injured reserve and was waived by the Chargers at the start of the 1985 season. He was signed by the Broncos prior to the 1986 season, but again spent the season on the injured reserve.

In 1987, after being cut by the Broncos just before the start of the season and saying he would never cross the picket line, Woodard crossed the picket line to play as a replacement player during the 1987 NFL Player's Strike. It was the first playing time he got in an NFL game and he recorded half a sack. He was released by the Broncos at the end of the strike but then signed a few weeks later with the Kansas City Chiefs where he spent the rest of the season, but recorded no stats. Because Woodard signed with the Chiefs before the end of the season, he was ineligible to receive the 50% playoff bonus that other Broncos got when the team went to Super Bowl XXII. He retired before the 1988 season began.

== Coaching career ==
After retiring as a player, Woodard returned to school and received his bachelor's degree in kinesiology and history from Sam Houston State University in 1988. He received his masters in education from the University of Texas at Tyler in 1991. On October 23, 2014, Ray Woodard earned his Doctorate in Educational Leadership from Lamar University. He joined a select group of Division I coaches with doctorates. Including Woodard, there were six Division I coaches with a doctorate at the time he received his doctorate. One of those six was an honorary doctorate. Woodard was also one of three Division I (FCS) coaches with a doctorate.

=== Professional teams ===
Woodard coached with several professional teams, starting with the Texas Terror of the Arena Football League in 1996, and then the Frankfurt Galaxy of the World League of American Football (WLAF) in 1997. In 1999, he served as head coach of the Houston Outlaws of the short-lived Regional Football League. In 2000, he was the head coach for the Houston Marshals of the Spring Football League. Woodard later served as the defensive coordinator for the Scottish Claymores of the WLAF from 2000 to 2003.

=== Navarro College ===
From 2005 to 2007, Woodard spent his time coaching at Navarro College, a two-year college whose main campus is in Corsicana, Texas. His first two seasons at Navarro were spent as a defensive coordinator and as head coach in his last season. His 2007 squad went 9–3 and advanced to the conference playoffs for the first time in six seasons.

Navarro defeated defending national champion Blinn College on consecutive weeks before rolling past Kilgore College — the Southwest Junior College Football Conference (SWJCFC) regular-season champion — on the road, 54–28, to earn the school's first bowl bid since the 1990s.

Navarro claimed a 24–21 win over Georgia Military College in the Pilgrim's Pride Bowl to finish the year ranked fourth in the NJCAA national poll. For his efforts, Woodard was named the SWJCFC Coach of the Year.

Navarro ranked third nationally in total offense (444.6 yards per game), fourth in rushing offense (250.5 ypg) and 16th in passing offense (194.2 ypg), while scoring a school-record 428 points for an average of 35.7 per game in 2007.

=== Lamar University ===
In 2008, Lamar University hired Ray Woodard to help bring football back to Lamar after an almost 20-year absence. The Lamar Cardinals football team played their first season in 2010 under coach Woodard. That season, the Cardinals went 5–6 as Division I independents. The Cardinals began football competition in the NCAA Division I FCS Southland Conference the following year. On November 21, 2016 at approximately 1:30pm, Woodard was informed he was no longer head coach for Lamar.

=== High school ===
In 2019, Woodard became the head football coach at Class 1A Chester High School in Chester, Texas. In 2021 he moved to Groveton to be an assistant coach.

== Head coaching record ==
=== College ===
| Year | Team | Overall | Conference | Standing | Bowl/playoffs |
|---|---|---|---|---|---|
Lamar Cardinals (NCAA Division I FCS independent) (2010)
| 2010 | Lamar | 5–6 | | | |
Lamar Cardinals (Southland Conference) (2011–2016)
| 2011 | Lamar | 4–7 | 2–5 | 6th | |
| 2012 | Lamar | 4–8 | 1–6 | 7th | |
| 2013 | Lamar | 5–7 | 2–4 | 6th | |
| 2014 | Lamar | 8–4 | 5–3 | T–3rd | |
| 2015 | Lamar | 5–6 | 4–5 | T–5th | |
| 2016 | Lamar | 3–8 | 3–6 | T–8th | |
| Lamar: | | 34–46 | 17–29 | | |
| Total: | | 34–46 | | | |

=== Junior college ===
| Year | Team | Overall | Conference | Standing | Bowl/playoffs |
|---|---|---|---|---|---|
Navarro Bulldogs (Southwest Junior College Football Conference) (2007)
| 2007 | Navarro | 9–3 | 4–2 | T–2nd | W SWJCFC championship, W Pilgrim's Pride Bowl |
| Navarro: | | 9–3 | 4–2 | | |
| Total: | | 9–3 | | | |
National championship Conference title Conference division title or championship game berth
