= Glass Bowl =

Stadium in Toledo, Ohio

Glass Bowl Stadium
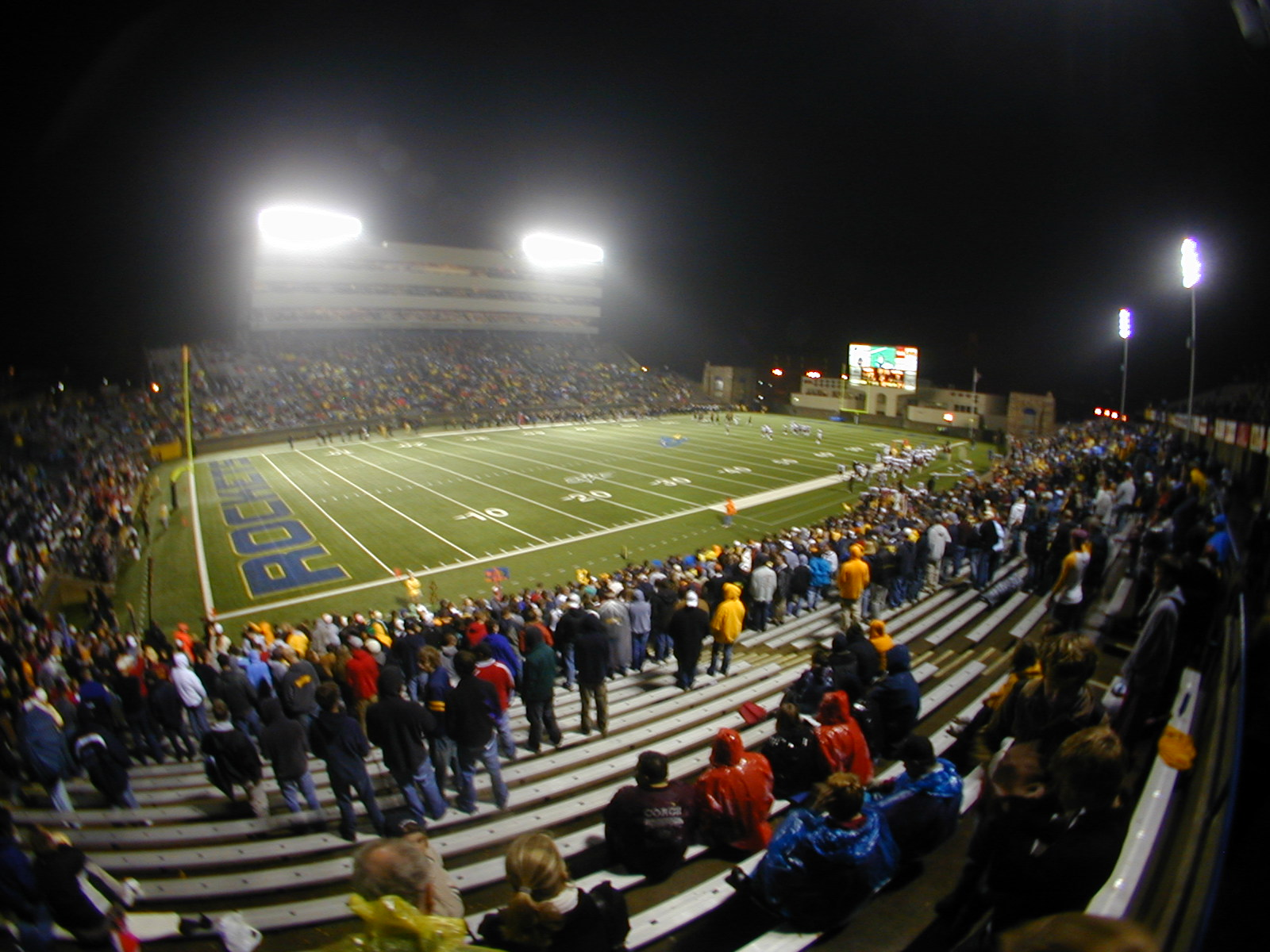
- Glass Bowl Stadium facing northwest, 2004
- Interactive map of Glass Bowl Stadium
- Former names: University Stadium (1937–1945)
- Location: 3044 N. Glass Bowl Dr. Toledo, Ohio 43606
- Coordinates: 41°39′25″N 83°36′49″W
- Owner: University of Toledo
- Operator: University of Toledo
- Capacity: 8,000 (1937–1939); 11,500 (1940–1948); 12,800 (1949–1965); 15,900 (1966–1970); 18,210 (1971–1989); 26,248 (1990–2000); 26,038 (2001–present)
- Surface: Field Turf (2008–present, replaced in 2016); AstroTurf (1975–2007); Grass (1937–1974)
- Record attendance: 36,852 (2001 vs Navy)

Construction
- Groundbreaking: 1936
- Opened: September 27, 1937
- Renovated: 1990, 2016
- Expanded: 1940, 1949, 1966, 1971, 1990
- Cost: $313,558 USD ($7.02 million in 2025 dollars) $18 million (renovation) ($44.4 million in 2025 dollars)
- Architects: SSOE, Inc. (renovation)

Tenants
- Toledo Rockets (NCAA) (1937–present); Glass Bowl Game (NCAA) (1946–1949); Ohio Cannon (RFL) (1999)

The Glass Bowl is a stadium in Toledo, Ohio. It is primarily used for American football, and is the home field of the American football team of the University of Toledo Rockets. It is located on the school's Bancroft campus, just south of the banks of the Ottawa River. Known for its blend of old and new, it retains the traditional stonework around the field throughout all its expansions.

== History ==
Originally known as University Stadium, it was completed in 1937 at a cost of $313,558 as a Works Progress Administration project. Originally the natural seating bowl held 8,000 in two sideline grandstands. There was a grass hill at the south end of the stadium, and at the open (north) end of the bowl were two stone towers (still standing), that served as makeshift housing for the football team in its early years. Following World War II, the stadium was renovated, with many glass elements. Because of this, and the city's concentration on the industry, the stadium was renamed the Glass Bowl in 1946. South end zone stands were added in 1966, and further expansion came following Toledo's 35-game win streak from 1969 to 1971, bringing capacity up to 18,500.

In 1999, the Toledo-based Ohio Cannon of the Regional Football League played at various stadiums, including the Glass Bowl, but did not finish the season.

The stadium hosted the 2001 MAC Championship Game.

The stadium hosted the Italian Bowl on July 1, 2023, it was the final game of the 2023 Italian Football League season. It hosted the Italian Bowl again in the summer of 2025.

=== Renovations ===
In 1990, the stadium had its largest expansion take place, adding a second level of seats to both sidelines. As part of the $18.5 million renovations, a three-story press box, 45 luxury suites, a 400-seat Stadium Club, sports information offices, and the Larimer Athletic Complex were built. The three-story press box, the second largest in the nation, was the greatest improvement in terms of upgrades, as the former press box was barely 30 feet (9.1 m) long and could only hold approximately 50 people.

Further improvements include a video scoreboard in the north end zone in 1999, and the upgrade to a Field Turf playing surface in 2008. A new video board was installed in 2010.

In 2016, a $3.5 million renovation took place, including replacement of the field turf, changes to the facade, updating concessions, restrooms, locker rooms, and ticket booths, as well as other minor cosmetic changes to the stadium.

== Attendance ==
The largest crowd in Glass Bowl history for a University of Toledo football game was 36,852 for a game against the United States Naval Academy on October 27, 2001.

=== Attendance records ===
1. 36,852 vs. Navy (2001)
2. 36,502 vs. Northern Illinois (2001)
3. 34,950 vs. Minnesota (2001)
4. 34,900 vs. Marshall (2000)
5. 33,040 vs. Indiana State (1994)
6. 32,726 vs. Weber State (2000)
7. 31,981 vs. Bowling Green (2004)
8. 31,711 vs. Pittsburgh (2003)
9. 31,458 vs. Bowling Green (1994)
10. 31,369 vs. Bowling Green (1982)

== Features ==
In 1961, the University of Toledo procured a genuine MIM-3 Nike Ajax rocket from the United States Army's missile program. The Army Ordnance Corps presented the missile to the school at that year's season opener. The one-ton rocket carries two sets of fins and a propellant booster capable of guiding it to supersonic velocity. It sits on a 14-foot pylon outside the Glass Bowl pointing Southwest.

The Glass Bowl was often formerly used by the Glassmen as a rehearsal facility during weekends in the late spring and early summer. In addition, the Glass Bowl is used for monster truck rallies, commencements, and concerts, among other uses.

== See also ==
- List of NCAA Division I FBS football stadiums
