= Dan Gonzalez =

American gridiron football player (born 1974)

No. 4, 14
- Position: Quarterback

Personal information
- Born: September 20, 1974 (age 52); Neptune Township, New Jersey, U.S.
- Listed height: 6 ft 3 in (1.91 m)
- Listed weight: 215 lb (98 kg)

Career information
- High school: Neptune
- College: East Carolina (1994–1997)
- NFL draft: 1998: undrafted

Career history
- Dallas Cowboys (1998); Miami Dolphins (1998); → Amsterdam Admirals (1999); Montreal Alouettes (2000–2001)

Dan Gonzalez (born September 20, 1974) is an American former professional football quarterback who played two seasons with the Montreal Alouettes of the Canadian Football League (CFL). He played college football at East Carolina University. He was also a member of the Dallas Cowboys, Miami Dolphins and Amsterdam Admirals.

== Early life ==
Gonzalez played high school football at Neptune High School in Neptune, New Jersey. He helped the Scarlet Fliers to playoff appearances his sophomore and senior years.

== College career ==
Gonzalez played for the East Carolina Pirates from 1994 to 1997. He made his first start for the Pirates during his junior season in November 1996 in place of the injured Marcus Crandell. He recorded totals of 3,868 yards on 23 passing touchdowns during his college career. Gonzalez was redshirted in 1993.

== Professional career ==
Gonzalez signed with the Dallas Cowboys after going undrafted in the 1998 NFL draft. During the preseason, he competed with Josh LaRocca for the Cowboys' third-string quarterback job. LaRocca was released on August 24 while Gonzalez was released on August 29. Gonzalez re-signed with the Cowboys on September 3. He was released again on September 8, two days after the Cowboys' regular season opener.

Gonzalez was signed to the practice squad of the Miami Dolphins on September 23, 1998. He was released on October 2 but later re-signed on December 26, one day before the regular season finale. In 1999, he was allocated to NFL Europe, where he played for the Amsterdam Admirals. He played for the Montreal Alouettes of the Canadian Football League from 2000 to 2001.

== Coaching career ==
Gonzalez was later a coach at Indian River High School in Chesapeake, Virginia.
