= Tom Walsh (American football) =

American football coach

Biographical details
- Born: April 16, 1949 (age 77); Vallejo, California, U.S.
- Education: UC Santa Barbara

Coaching career (HC unless noted)
- 1978: Rubidoux HS (CA)
- 1979: United States International
- 1980: Murray State (OC/QB)
- 1981: Cincinnati (OC/QB)
- 1982–1991: Los Angeles Raiders (QB/WR)
- 1992–1994: Los Angeles Raiders (OC)
- 1997–1998: Idaho State
- 1999: Mobile Admirals
- 2006: Oakland Raiders (OC)

Head coaching record
- Overall: 14–19 (college)

Tom Walsh (born April 16, 1949) is an American former football coach. Walsh is best known for his two stints as offensive coordinator for the Los Angeles and Oakland Raiders in the National Football League (NFL).

== Early career ==
Walsh entered coaching in 1978 as the coach of Rubidoux High School in Jurupa Valley, California. In 1979 he moved up to the college ranks as the head coach of United States International before becoming the offensive coordinator and quarterbacks coach of Murray State in 1980. In 1981 he was brought on as the offensive coordinator and quarterbacks coach of Cincinnati.

== Los Angeles Raiders ==
In 1982 he was hired as the quarterbacks and wide receivers coach of the newly relocated Los Angeles Raiders under head coach Tom Flores. Under Flores he was part of the coaching staff that won Super Bowl XVIII. In 1991 Walsh became offensive coordinator under head coach Art Shell. After several disputes with players over his coaching style and an alleged fight with offensive line coach Bill Meyers during the 1994 season Walsh was fired along with Shell after the 1994 season.

== Return to college coaching ==
After being fired from the Raiders, Walsh went on to coach the Idaho State Bengals in 1997 and 1998, compiling a 6–16 record. He then coached the Mobile Admirals to the league championship of the short-lived professional Regional Football League in 1999. After 1999, Walsh was all but retired from coaching.

== Out of football ==
Walsh spent the years out of coaching operating a bed and breakfast in Swan Valley, Idaho. He also served as the town's mayor.

== Oakland Raiders ==
After five years out of football and twelve out of the NFL, Walsh was re-hired by the Oakland Raiders in February 2006, as offensive coordinator by head coach Art Shell but demoted before the end of the 2006 season which resulted in a 2–14 record and replaced by John Shoop. During the time Walsh was the offensive coordinator for the 2006 Raiders, his offense was referred to as the "Bed and Breakfast Offense". After leaving the Raiders, Walsh stated that Randy Moss, whom he coached in Oakland, was "a player whose skills are diminishing." Moss went on to break the single season touchdown reception record in 2007 after being traded to the New England Patriots.

== Head coaching record ==
=== College ===
Year	Team	Overall	Conference	Standing	Bowl/playoffs
United States International Gulls (NCAA Division II independent) (1979)
1979	United States International	8–3			
United States International:		8–3			
Idaho State Bengals (Big Sky Conference) (1997–1998)
1997	Idaho State	3–8	2–6	8th	
1998	Idaho State	3–8	2–6	9th	
Idaho State:		6–16	4–12		
Total:		14–19			
