= New Orleans Thunder =

American football team

- Founded: 1998
- Folded: 1999
- League: Regional Football League
- Based in: New Orleans, Louisiana
- Stadium: Tad Gormley Stadium
- Owner: Leon Fulton
- Head coach: Rex Stevenson (2 games); Buford Jordan

The New Orleans Thunder were a professional American football team that played during the 1999 season as part of the Regional Football League. They played their home games at Tad Gormley Stadium in City Park in New Orleans.

The team was announced as one of the league's charter members on November 12, 1998. For their lone season, Rex Stevenson would serve as head coach for the preseason and first two games before being replaced with former New Orleans Saints player Buford Jordan. The team was quarterbacked by Doug Coleman, who had played for the Eastern New Mexico Greyhounds of NCAA Division II.

Although the team was scheduled to play a 12-game regular season, poor attendance and sagging revenues would prove too much for the new league. The Thunder lost each of their first six games, then had a game cancelled due to financial constraints, before winning their final game. As a result, the team finished with a record of 1–6 for its lone season. After the season, the team looked at relocating to Birmingham, Alabama, however the move never came to fruition as both the team and the league were disbanded.

The Thunder played in the only RFL game ever televised, on May 8, 1999, in Alabama against the eventual-champion Mobile Admirals. The contest was shown on WHNO, a mainly-religious station in New Orleans.

== 1999 season schedule ==
Date	Opponent	Site	W/L	Score	Attnd.	Ref.
April 18	Mobile Admirals	Home	L	14–42	500	
April 25	Ohio Cannon	Away	L	0–34		
May 2	Mississippi Pride	Home	L	14–30	4,000	
May 8	Mobile Admirals	Away	L	6–23	10,146	
May 16	Shreveport Knights	Home	L	14–31	125	
May 22	Houston Outlaws	Away	L	12–31	1,500	
May 29	Ohio Cannon	Home	—	cancelled	—	
June 5†	Mississippi Pride	Away	W	12–7	2,700	

† The June 5 game was originally scheduled to be against the Shreveport Knights, in Shreveport.
