= Stewart Patridge =

American football player (born 1974)

Profile
- Position: Quarterback

Personal information
- Born: December 6, 1974 (age 51); Morgan City, Mississippi, U.S.
- Listed height: 6 ft 2 in (1.88 m)
- Listed weight: 207 lb (94 kg)

Career information
- College: Ole Miss

Career history
- Mississippi Pride (1999); New England Sea Wolves (2000); Florida Bobcats (2001); Carolina Cobras (2002–2003)
- Stats at ArenaFan.com

Stewart Patridge (born December 6, 1974) is an American former football quarterback best known as the leader of the University of Mississippi Rebels from 1995 to 1997. He won the 1997 Conerly Trophy as the best college football player in the state.

== Early life ==
Patridge, a native of Morgan City, Mississippi, attended Pillow Academy, earning three letters in football, baseball and basketball. While an honor roll student at Pillow Academy, Patridge was named All-Conference his junior and senior years, Area Athlete of the Year and team Most Valuable Player his junior and senior years.

== College career ==
After graduating from high school in 1993, Patridge attended Mississippi Delta Community College, where, as a freshman, he helped lead the football team to a 12-0 record and a national Junior College Championship. Patridge played for only one year at Mississippi Delta Community College before transferring to the University of Mississippi in Oxford, Mississippi. He earned his first letter in 1996 by playing in 10 of the 11 games, Patridge became the No. 2 quarterback behind Paul Head, taking over in the final three games of the season; and during the 1996 season, Patridge completed 79 of 154 passes for 876 yards with three touchdowns and four interceptions, completing an individual game high of 17 passes for the win against Georgia.

Patridge received numerous awards while playing at the University of Mississippi including the 1997 Ole Miss Quarterback Club Player of the Year, Offensive Player of the Week, Southeastern Conference Player of the Week and was named as the ESPN National Player of the Week after the LSU game when he completed 27 of 43 passes for 346 yards and two touchdowns as the Rebels upset the No. 8 ranked Tigers, 36-21 in Baton Rouge.

Patridge became the only quarterback in Ole Miss history to pass for over 200 yards in nine games in a single season. Patridge also holds the school record for 200 straight passes without an interception.

Patridge, having only started 14 games, ranks 6th for most passes completed, 7th for pass attempts and 7th for passing yards; and

Patridge led the Rebels to a post-season bowl appearance in the first Motor City Bowl. Patridge was named Most Valuable Player as he completed 29 of 47 passes for 332 yards and three touchdowns.

Patridge finished his career at Ole Miss completing 310 of 510 passes for 3,564 yards and 15 touchdowns, giving him a 60.6 completion percentage, which is the third all-time best in Rebel history and making him 8th in school history for total offense.

== Professional career ==
In 1999, Patridge played for the Mississippi Pride in the Regional Football League, where he was named the all-RFL quarterback. Then, after the RFL folded, he went to the New England Sea Wolves, the Florida Bobcats and the Carolina Cobras in the Arena Football League from 2000 through 2003.

Patridge is currently living in Olive Branch, Mississippi.
