= Fred Akers =

American football player and coach (1938–2020)

Biographical details
- Born: March 17, 1938; Blytheville, Arkansas, U.S.
- Died: December 7, 2020 (aged 82); Horseshoe Bay, Texas, U.S.

Playing career
- 1958–1959: Arkansas
- Positions: Halfback, kicker, punter

Coaching career (HC unless noted)
- 1963–1964: Edinburg HS (TX)
- 1965: Lubbock HS (TX)
- 1966–1974: Texas (co-OC)
- 1975–1976: Wyoming
- 1977–1986: Texas
- 1987–1990: Purdue
- 1999: Shreveport Knights

Head coaching record
- Overall: 108–75–3 (college); 25–13–1 (high school)
- Bowls: 2–8

Accomplishments and honors

Championships
- 1 WAC (1976); 2 SWC (1977, 1983)

Awards
- 2× SWC Coach of the Year (1977, 1983); WAC Coach of the Year (1976)

Frederick Sanford Akers (March 17, 1938 – December 7, 2020) was an American football player and coach. He served as head football coach at the University of Wyoming (1975–1976), the University of Texas at Austin (1977–1986), and Purdue University (1987–1990), compiling a career college football record of 108–75–3.

== Coaching career ==
Akers' notable accomplishments as head coach at Texas include national title chances in 1977 and 1983. In both of those years, Texas went undefeated in the regular season only to lose in the Cotton Bowl Classic. Akers coached Earl Campbell in his Heisman Trophy-winning 1977 season.

Akers received criticism from those who believed he failed to match the standard set by previous head coach Darrell Royal. Twice in his tenure was the team undefeated and ranked in the top 2 of the AP Poll and twice they lost in the ensuing bowl game. However, much of that was mitigated by an impressive overall record and a winning mark against Barry Switzer of the Oklahoma Sooners, who was 3–0–1 against Texas before Akers came along. However, in Akers' last five years he struggled against Oklahoma, going 1–3–1, and against Texas A&M, losing his last three games to the Aggies by an average margin of 23 points. Akers drew ire from the Texas faithful for losing bowl games at the end of four consecutive seasons (1982–1985). During his tenure in 1978, Akers was lampooned by future Bloom County creator Berke Breathed, whose student strip The Academia Waltz appeared in the school newspaper.

In 1986, after notching Texas' first losing record in 30 years, Akers left to become the head football coach at Purdue University, replacing Leon Burtnett. The Akers' hiring caused starting quarterback Jeff George to transfer, due to Akers' running style offense as compared to Burtnett's passing offense. At Purdue, Akers was not nearly as successful as he had been at Texas; his teams only won 12 games in four years, and after the worst season in Purdue's history in 1990 amidst discipline problems, Akers was asked to resign. Akers was rumored as a candidate for the Baylor University job in 1993, that ultimately went to Chuck Reedy, but the Purdue post proved to be his final college coaching post.

In 1999, Akers served as head coach of the Shreveport Knights in the short-lived professional Regional Football League.

== Personal life ==
Akers was a member of the Sigma Chi fraternity. In August 2008, Akers lived in Horseshoe Bay, Texas. Fred Akers died on December 7, 2020. He was 82 years old.

== Head coaching record ==
=== College ===
Year	Team	Overall	Conference	Standing	Bowl/playoffs	Coaches^{#}	AP^{°}
Wyoming Cowboys (Western Athletic Conference) (1975–1976)
1975	Wyoming	2–9	1–6	7th			
1976	Wyoming	8–4	6–1	T–1st	L Fiesta		
Wyoming:		10–13					
Texas Longhorns (Southwest Conference) (1977–1986)
1977	Texas	11–1	8–0	1st	L Cotton	5	4
1978	Texas	9–3	6–2	T–2nd	W Sun	9	9
1979	Texas	9–3	6–2	3rd	L Sun	13	12
1980	Texas	7–5	4–4	T–4th	L Astro-Bluebonnet		
1981	Texas	10–1–1	6–1–1	2nd	W Cotton	4	2
1982	Texas	9–3	7–1	2nd	L Sun	18	17
1983	Texas	11–1	8–0	1st	L Cotton	5	5
1984	Texas	7–4–1	5–3	T–3rd	L Freedom		
1985	Texas	8–4	6–2	T–2nd	L Bluebonnet		
1986	Texas	5–6	4–4	6th			
Texas:		86–31–2	60–19–1				
Purdue Boilermakers (Big Ten Conference) (1987–1990)
1987	Purdue	3–7–1	3–5	T–6th			
1988	Purdue	4–7	3–5	6th			
1989	Purdue	3–8	2–6	8th			
1990	Purdue	2–9	1–7	T–8th			
Purdue:		12–31–1	9–23				
Total:		108–75–3					
National championship Conference title Conference division title or championship game berth
^{#}Rankings from final Coaches Poll.; ^{°}Rankings from final AP Poll.

=== RFL ===
Team	Year	Regular Season					Postseason			
Team	Year	Won	Lost	Ties	Win %	Finish	Won	Lost	Win %	Result
SHRV	1999	3	5	0	.375	5th	–	–	–	–
Total		3	5	0	.375		–	–	–	
Overall Total		3	5	0	.375	RFL Championships (0)				

=== High school ===
Year	Team	Overall	Conference	Standing	Bowl/playoffs
Edinburg Bobcats () (1962–1964)
1962	Edinburg	6–2–1			
1963	Edinburg	5–5			
1964	Edinburg	7–3			
Edinburg:		18–10–1			
Lubbock Westerners () (1965)
1965	Lubbock	7–3			
Lubbock:		7–3			
Total:		25–13–1			
