= Mississippi Pride =

- Founded: 1998
- Folded: 1999
- League: Regional Football League
- Based in: Jackson, Mississippi
- Stadium: Mississippi Veterans Memorial Stadium
- Owner: Wayne Van
- Head coach: Johnny Plummer

The Mississippi Pride were a professional American football team that played during the 1999 season as part of the Regional Football League. They played their home games at Mississippi Veterans Memorial Stadium in Jackson, Mississippi.

The team was announced as one of the league's charter members on November 12, 1998. For their lone season, former Mississippi State Bulldogs assistant coach Johnny Plummer served as head coach.

Although the team was scheduled to play a 12-game regular season, poor attendance and sagging revenues would prove too much for the new league. In the shortened regular season, the Pride had a 4–4 record. In the postseason, the Pride were seeded third in the four-team playoff bracket, and lost to the second seed, the Houston Outlaws. Pride starter Stewart Patridge was named the all-RFL quarterback. After the season, the team and league ceased operation.

== 1999 season schedule ==
Date	Opponent	Site	W/L	Score	Attnd.	Ref.
April 17	Shreveport Knights	Away	L	12–40	2,866	
April 24	Houston Outlaws	Home	L	5–28	3,000	
May 2	New Orleans Thunder	Away	W	30–14	4,000	
May 8	Ohio Cannon	Home	W	20–17	3,500	
May 15	Mobile Admirals	Away	L	13–36		
May 22	Shreveport Knights	Home	W	35–10	4,800	
May 29	Mobile Admirals	Home	W	28–20	6,500	
June 5†	New Orleans Thunder	Home	L	7–12	2,700	
Playoffs
June 12	Houston Outlaws	Away	L	3–27		

† The June 5 game was originally scheduled for June 6 in Toledo against the Ohio Thunder.
