= Shreveport Knights =

- Founded: 1998
- Folded: 1999
- League: Regional Football League
- Based in: Shreveport, Louisiana
- Stadium: Independence Stadium
- Colors: Purple, Green & Gold
- Owner: Jay Graddick
- Head coach: Fred Akers

The Shreveport Knights were a professional American football team that played during the 1999 season as part of the Regional Football League. They played their home games at Independence Stadium in Shreveport, Louisiana.

The team was announced as one of the league's charter members on November 12, 1998. The team was initially named the "Shreveport-Bossier City Southern Knights", however this was too long and the name was shortened. For their lone season, Fred Akers served as head coach, and Jason Martin, who had played college football for the Louisiana Tech Bulldogs, was the starting quarterback. The team's colors were purple, green, and gold.

Although the team was scheduled to play a 12-game regular season, poor attendance and sagging revenues would prove too much for the new league. After playing to a 3–4 record, the Knights were unable to use their home stadium, for financial reasons. For the eighth game of the season, adjustment by the league resulted in Shreveport being rescheduled to play on the road, but when the Knights did not travel to the game, they were assessed a forfeit. Shortly thereafter, the league ended the regular season, and the Knights did not qualify for the playoffs with their 3–5 record. After the season, the team and the league ceased operation.

== 1999 season schedule ==
Date	Opponent	Site	W/L	Score	Attnd.	Ref.
April 17	Mississippi Pride	Home	W	40–12	2,866	
April 24	Mobile Admirals	Away	L	7–15	13,256	
May 1	Ohio Cannon	Home	W	29–13		
May 8	Houston Outlaws	Home	L	14–17	2,000	
May 16	New Orleans Thunder	Away	W	31–14	125	
May 22	Mississippi Pride	Away	L	10–35	4,800	
May 30	Houston Outlaws	Away	L	7–17		
June 6†	Ohio Cannon	Away	L	forfeit	—	

† Shreveport had been scheduled to host New Orleans on June 5, but Shreveport was unable to use their stadium. The league rescheduled New Orleans to play in Mississippi on that date, and Shreveport was rescheduled to play in Ohio on June 6. A forfeit was assessed to Shreveport when they did not travel to play Ohio.
