= Houston Outlaws (RFL team) =

- Founded: 1998
- Folded: 1999
- League: Regional Football League
- Based in: Houston, Texas
- Stadium: Pasadena Memorial Stadium
- Head coach: Ray Woodard

The Houston Outlaws were a professional American football team that played during the 1999 season as part of the Regional Football League. They played their home games at Pasadena Memorial Stadium in Pasadena, Texas, a suburb of Houston.

The team was announced as one of the league's charter members on November 12, 1998. Although Pro Football Hall of Fame inductee Ernie Stautner was named head coach in February 1999, there is no record of him acting in that capacity. For the team's lone season, former NFL defensive tackle Ray Woodard served as head coach. Josh LaRocca, who had played college football for the Rice Owls, was the starting quarterback.

Although the team was scheduled to play a 12-game regular season, poor attendance and sagging revenues would prove too much for the new league. In the shortened regular season, the Outlaws had a 6–2 record. In the postseason, the Outlaws were seeded second in the four-team playoff bracket. They defeated the Mississippi Pride in a home game, 27–3, to advance to the championship game against the top-seeded Mobile Admirals. In RFL Bowl I, played at the Admirals' home field, Ladd–Peebles Stadium, the Outlaws were edged by the Admirals, 14–12. It was the third time the Admirals defeated the Outlaws, who did not lose to any other team. After the season, the team and league ceased operation.

== 1999 season schedule ==
Date	Opponent	Site	W/L	Score	Attnd.	Ref.
April 18	Ohio Cannon	Away	W	18–17		
April 24	Mississippi Pride	Away	W	28–5	3,000	
May 1	Mobile Admirals	Away†	L	7–10	10,432	
May 8	Shreveport Knights	Away	W	17–14	2,000	
May 15	Ohio Cannon	Home	W	27–3		
May 22	New Orleans Thunder	Home	W	31–12	1,500	
May 30	Shreveport Knights	Home	W	17–7		
June 5	Mobile Admirals	Away	L	3–14		
Playoffs
June 12	Mississippi Pride	Home	W	27–3		
June 20	Mobile Admirals	Away	L	12–14	5,571	

† May 1 game played in Mobile due to schedule conflict with Houston's stadium
