= Ladd–Peebles Stadium =

Stadium in Mobile, Alabama

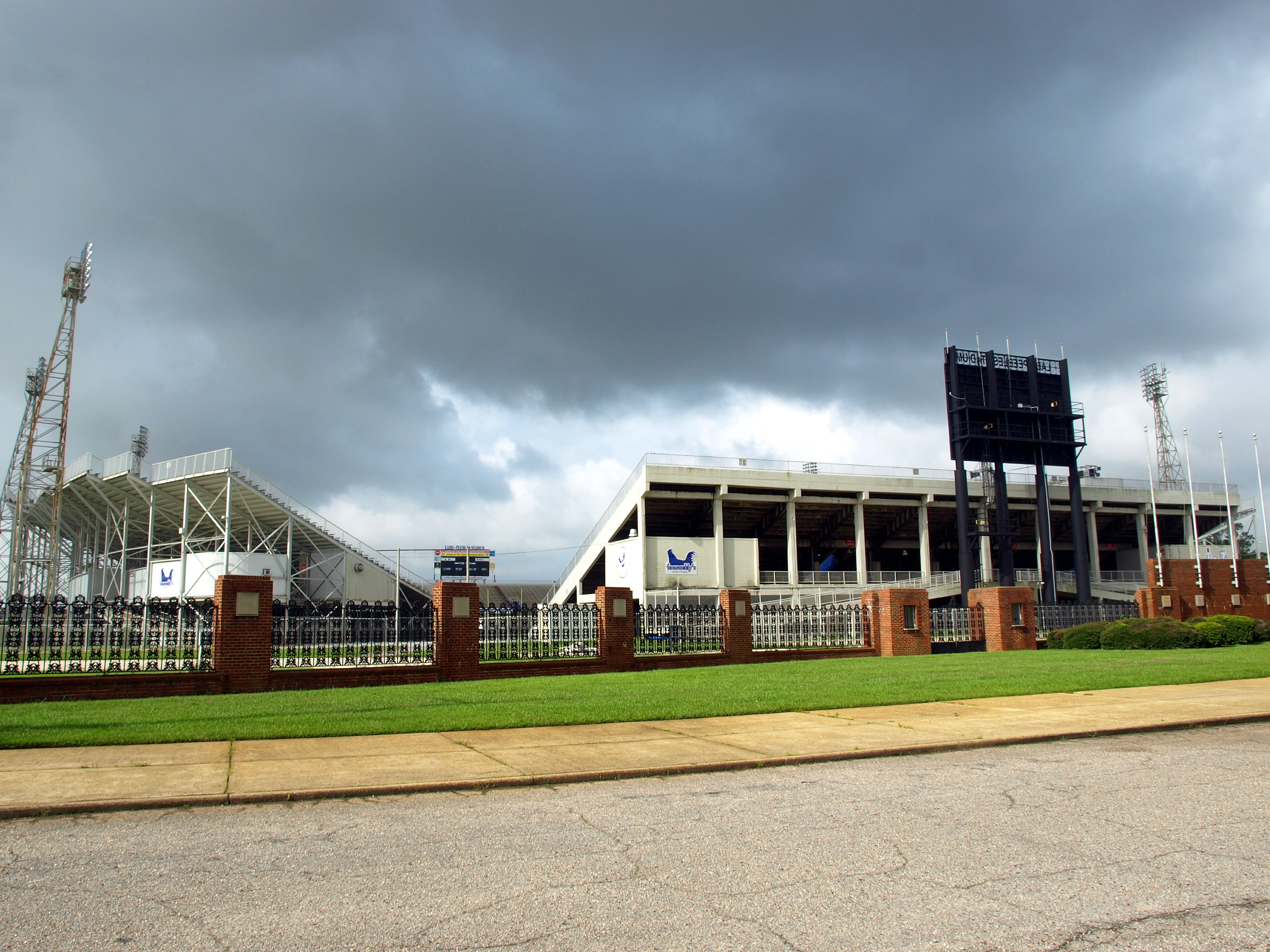

- Location in Alabama Location in the United States
- Former names: Ernest F. Ladd Memorial Stadium (1948–1997)
- Location: 1621 Virginia Street; Mobile, Alabama, U.S.
- Coordinates: 30.673°N 88.076°W
- Owner: City of Mobile
- Operator: City of Mobile
- Capacity: 40,000 (football, 2011–present); 40,646 (football, 1969–2010); 40,605 (football, 1958–1968); 36,000 (football, 1948–1957); 50,000 (concerts)
- Surface: FieldTurf (2004–present); Natural grass (1948–2004)

Construction
- Opened: October 2, 1948; 78 years ago
- Cost: $10 million (renovations)
- Architects: Clark Geer & Latham and Associates, Inc. (renovations)

Tenants
- Alabama Crimson Tide (alternate site) NCAA (1948–1968); Auburn Tigers (alternate site) NCAA (1948–1955); Southern Miss Golden Eagles (alternate site) NCAA (1950–1974); Senior Bowl (NCAA) (1951–2020); Alabama State Hornets (alternate site) NCAA (1974–2009); Alabama-Mississippi All-Star Classic (1988–2010); Mobile Admirals (RFL) (1999); LendingTree Bowl (NCAA) (1999–2020); South Alabama Jaguars (NCAA) (2009–2019); Gulf Coast Challenge (2018–present); Port City Classic (2023–present)

Ladd–Peebles Stadium (formerly Ernest F. Ladd Memorial Stadium) is a football stadium located in Mobile, Alabama. Opened in 1948, it has a seating capacity of 33,471. It is primarily used for American football. In addition to football, the stadium is also used for concerts (maximum capacity 50,000), boxing matches, high school graduations, trade shows, and festivals. Numerous entertainers have performed at Ladd–Peebles Stadium. It is currently the home of two HBCU Football Classics: the Gulf Coast Challenge between the Jackson State Tigers and Alabama A&M Bulldogs and the Port City Classic between the Alabama State Hornets and Mississippi Valley State Delta Devils.

== History ==
The stadium was constructed in 1948 by Bender Shipbuilding with private funding from a local banker wishing to create a permanent honor to his mentor, Ernest F. Ladd, a local banking magnate who died in 1941, with the stadium initially carrying the name "Ernest F. Ladd Memorial Stadium". On May 4 and 5 of 1955, a tour headlining country and western stars Hank Snow, Faron Young, The Wilburn Brothers, Mother Maybelle, The Carter Sisters (including June, the future Mrs. Johnny Cash), Jimmy Rogers Snow, The Davis Sisters, Onie Wheeler and a still unknown Elvis Presley played two nightly shows there. More than 40 years later, in 1997, it was renamed "Ladd-Peebles Stadium", continuing to honor Ladd, but also honoring E. B. Peebles, a civic leader who was instrumental in the revitalization of the Senior Bowl.

=== Renovations ===
In 1997, Ladd–Peebles Stadium underwent a $8.1 million renovation that resulted in a new press box featuring a 120-seat club level and luxury suites, new scoreboards, new PA and lighting systems, new locker rooms, new restrooms, an expansion of the concourse areas, and new concession stands, as well as the stadium offices.

In 2004, the stadium selected and installed FieldTurf as its new playing surface.

On December 6, 2008, the Board of Trustees at the University of South Alabama approved adding football to its intercollegiate athletics program. The move came with the announcement that the team would call Ladd–Peebles Stadium home for at least seven years. In 2020, the Jaguars moved to their new on-campus stadium.

The stadium underwent a $2.2 million facelift which also includes the construction of 11 luxury sky boxes on the stadium's west side. The project was finished at the beginning of the 2009 season.

== Events ==
The stadium's first game was in 1948, between the Alabama Crimson Tide and the Vanderbilt Commodores on October 2, with the Tide scoring on the final play for a 14–14 tie. From 1948 to 1968, with the exceptions of 1960 and 1962, the Crimson Tide played one game per year in Ladd Stadium. In 1958, Paul "Bear" Bryant coached his first game as Alabama's head coach in Ladd Stadium when the Crimson Tide fell 13–3 to LSU. Notable Tigers that year were Billy Cannon and Johnny Robinson.

The Senior Bowl played its inaugural edition at the Gator Bowl in Jacksonville in January 1950, then moved to Mobile, where it was played in Ladd–Peebles until January 2020. The game moved to the University of South Alabama's on-campus Hancock Whitney Stadium in 2021.

Ladd–Peebles Stadium also played host to numerous other major college games over the years. Auburn played eight games at Ladd from 1948 to 1955, playing the likes of Clemson, Florida, and Ole Miss. The University of Southern Mississippi in Hattiesburg was also a consistent Ladd Stadium tenant, as the Golden Eagles played seventeen games there from 1950 through 1974; Southern Miss opponents included Texas A&M, Florida State, and Alabama.

Beginning in 1974, the stadium began hosting the Gulf Coast Classic, an Alabama State University homecoming game against a fellow Southwestern Athletic Conference (SWAC) opponent.

In 1988, the stadium hosted the first Alabama-Mississippi All-Star Classic, an annual football event that features the best senior high school players and top collegiate prospects from Mississippi against the best from Alabama. The event has since been moved to Montgomery and is now played in December.

In 1999, the self-styled "major league of spring football", the Regional Football League, played its only season. The league champions were the Mobile Admirals, who hosted the RFL Bowl at Land-Peebles on June 20, 1999, and defeated the Houston Outlaws, 14-12, in front of a crowd announced as 5,571. The league folded soon thereafter.

In December 1999, the stadium hosted the inaugural Mobile Alabama Bowl. Held annually since then, the game has undergone several name changes due to sponsorship agreements; as of November 2019 it is known as the LendingTree Bowl. Formerly matching teams from the Mid-American Conference and Conference USA, the bowl announced a new agreement in 2009 to annually feature teams from the Atlantic Coast Conference and the Mid-American Conference beginning with the 2010 game. The agreement, however, was canceled after one year and the bowl's matchup now consists of the Mid-American Conference facing the Sun Belt Conference.

On September 13, 2014, attendance at a game between the South Alabama Jaguars and the Mississippi State Bulldogs was 38,129; it was the first sell-out in the Jaguars' football history; however, the Bulldogs won, 35–3.

On August 21, 2015, from 20,000 to 30,000 people gathered at the stadium for a rally for 2016 presidential candidate Donald Trump.
