= Sherman Williams (American football) =

American football player (born 1973)

No. 20
- Position: Running back

Personal information
- Born: August 13, 1973 (age 53); Mobile, Alabama, U.S.
- Listed height: 5 ft 8 in (1.73 m)
- Listed weight: 202 lb (92 kg)

Career information
- High school: Blount (Eight Mile, Alabama)
- College: Alabama
- NFL draft: 1995: 2nd round, 46th overall pick

Career history
- Dallas Cowboys (1995–1999); Mobile Admirals (1999)

Awards and highlights
- Super Bowl champion (XXX); Regional Football League MVP (1999); National champion (1992); Second-team All-American (1994); First-team All-SEC (1994); Florida Citrus Bowl MVP (1995)

Career NFL statistics
- Games played: 60
- Rushing yards: 1,162
- Rushing attempts: 302
- Rushing TDs: 4
- Receptions: 40
- Stats at Pro Football Reference

Sherman Cedric Williams (born August 13, 1973) is an American former professional football player who was a running back in the National Football League (NFL) for the Dallas Cowboys; he was a member of their Super Bowl XXX winning team. He played college football for the Alabama Crimson Tide and was selected by the Cowboys in the second round of the 1995 NFL draft.

== Early life ==
Williams attended Mattie T. Blount High School in Mobile County, Alabama, where as a senior he became the first running back in Alabama prep history to rush for over 3,000 yards in a season, after registering 3,004 rushing yards, 307 carries and 31 touchdowns. He also received All-State honors, while leading his team to the Class 5A state title and receiving player of the year honors.

== College career ==
In 1990 he accepted a football scholarship from the University of Alabama. As a freshman, he played in 8 games, tallying 108 rushing yards and 2 touchdowns.

As a sophomore during the '91–'92 season, he was the team's fourth leading rusher behind Derrick Lassic, collecting 299 yards on 64 carries and 8 touchdowns. His best game came against Louisiana State University, when he rushed for 69 yards and 2 touchdowns on 10 carries. He was a member of the 1992 National Championship team. In the Sugar Bowl against the University of Miami, he had the first touchdown of the game, a two-yard run.

As a junior during the '92–'93 season, he was named the starter in the third game in place of an injured Chris Anderson. He never gave back the job and opened the season with five straight 100 rushing yard games. He posted 738 rushing yards with 9 touchdowns, including 148 yards on 24 carries against the University of Arkansas.

As a senior during the '93–'94 season, he rushed for 1,341 yards (second in school history) and became only the fourth Bama player to reach 1,000 rushing yards in a season. His 291 carries broke the school record for a season and his 138.5 all-purpose yards-per-game ranked 16th best in the nation. He earned All-SEC and second-team All-American honors in 1994. In the Florida Citrus Bowl, he became the first Bama player to gain over 100 yards rushing and receiving in a postseason game, after posting 166 rushing yards on 27 carries and 8 receptions for 155 yards, including a 50-yard touchdown reception for the winning touchdown with 42 seconds remaining, in the 24–17 victory over Ohio State University.

Williams finished his college career with 2,486 rushing yards (fifth in school history), 535 carries (third in school history), 27 rushing touchdowns (fourth in school history) and 424 receiving yards and 2 receiving touchdowns. He is also remembered for his signature touchdown dance, the "Sherman Shake".

== Professional career ==
Pre-draft measurables
Height	Weight	Arm length	Hand span	Bench press
5 ft 7 3/4 in (1.72 m)	196 lb (89 kg)	31 1/4 in (0.79 m)	9 7/8 in (0.25 m)	15 reps
All values from NFL Combine

Entering the 1995 NFL draft, the Dallas Cowboys considered their roster so strong, that they drafted players based on their contributions as backups. The team traded their first round draft choice (#28-Derrick Brooks) to the Tampa Bay Buccaneers in exchange for two second-round picks (#41-Ron Davis and #63-Shane Hannah). The Cowboys selected Williams with their first choice in the second round (46th overall), which was criticized by the media and quarterback Troy Aikman, for using a high selection on a backup player. As a rookie, he was a part of the Super Bowl XXX championship team. He tallied 205 rushing yards (second on the team) and one touchdown.

In 1996, he had 269 rushing yards. In 1997, he was expected to relieve more of Emmitt Smith's workload, but the additional playing time exposed him as fumble-prone, even though he had a career-high 468 rushing yards.

Williams was released during the 1998 offseason, after the team signed Chris Warren to be the backup running back to improve their depth. When Warren strained his groin in preseason, the team re-signed Williams as insurance. He contributed by being third on the team on special teams tackles (17) and while Warren's injury forced him to miss eight regular season games, Williams stepped up against the New York Giants in Week 3, when he rushed for 61 yards on 20 carries (including an 18-yard touchdown run) and in the final game of the regular season against the Washington Redskins, when he rushed for 90 yards on 23 carries and also caught three passes for 19 yards.

In the spring of 1999, Williams played for the Mobile Admirals of the short-lived Regional Football League. The Admirals were league champions, and Williams was named league MVP. In the 1999 NFL preseason, after the Cowboys third team running back (Tarik Smith) suffered a season-ending knee surgery, Williams was once more re-signed, but was eventually released after the first game of the regular season.

== NFL career statistics ==
Legend
**Bold**	Career high

=== Regular season ===
Year	Team	Games		Rushing					Receiving				
Year	Team	GP	GS	Att	Yds	Avg	Lng	TD	Rec	Yds	Avg	Lng	TD
1995	DAL	11	0	48	205	**4.3**	**44**	1	3	28	9.3	24	0
1996	DAL	**16**	1	69	269	3.9	27	0	5	41	8.2	13	0
1997	DAL	**16**	0	**121**	**468**	3.9	18	**2**	**21**	**159**	7.6	18	0
1998	DAL	**16**	**2**	64	220	3.4	24	1	11	104	**9.5**	**30**	0
1999	DAL	1	0	0	0	0.0	0	0	0	0	0.0	0	0
		60	3	302	1,162	3.8	44	4	40	332	8.3	30	0

=== Playoffs ===
Year	Team	Games		Rushing					Receiving				
Year	Team	GP	GS	Att	Yds	Avg	Lng	TD	Rec	Yds	Avg	Lng	TD
1995	DAL	**2**	0	11	33	3.0	10	0	0	0	0.0	0	0
1996	DAL	1	0	**17**	**67**	3.9	**20**	0	1	2	2.0	2	0
1998	DAL	1	**1**	3	22	**7.3**	**20**	0	**2**	**6**	**3.0**	**4**	0
		4	1	31	122	3.9	20	0	3	8	2.7	4	0

== Personal life ==
In 2000, Williams was sentenced to 15 years and 8 months in prison, for three counts of conspiracy to distribute marijuana and a separate plea for passing counterfeit currency. Saying that his time as a professional football player toughened him, Williams said in a prison interview, "You know, I would think that things that would kill the average man wouldn't even make me flinch". He was incarcerated on April 20, 2000. He was released on March 1, 2014.

After his release from prison, Williams started a community assistance program for disadvantaged children and returned to the University of Alabama, receiving his degree in May 2018.
