= Ohio Cannon =

Short-lived American football team

- Founded: 1998
- Folded: 1999
- League: Regional Football League
- Based in: Toledo, Ohio
- Stadium: Glass Bowl
- Head coach: Darrell Farmer (2 games); Ken James

The Ohio Cannon, also known as the Toledo Cannon, was a professional American football team that played during the 1999 season as part of the Regional Football League. They played their home games at the Glass Bowl in Toledo, Ohio.

The team was announced as one of the league's charter members on November 12, 1998. For their lone season, Darrell Farmer was named as head coach; he resigned in late April, after two regular season games, stating that he had not been paid per his contract. Farmer was succeeded by Ken James.

Although the team was scheduled to play a 12-game regular season, poor attendance and sagging revenues would prove too much for the new league. The Cannon played to a 2–4 record in their first six games. One of their wins came over the league-leading Mobile Admirals in a game played in Charleston, West Virginia, as Cannon quarterback Major Harris had played college football for the West Virginia Mountaineers.

The Cannon's planned seventh game of the season was canceled by the league due to financial difficulties. The league adjusted schedules for the eighth week of the season, and when the Shreveport Knights did not travel to play the Cannon in Toledo, the league forfeited the game to Ohio. The regular season was ended by the league at that point, and the Cannon's 3–4 record made them the fourth seed in the four-team postseason.

Prior to Ohio's playoff game against top-seeded Mobile, Cannon players refused to take the field without financial concessions from ownership. After a delay of approximately 30 minutes past the scheduled start time, an agreement was reached, and the game was played. Although the Cannon scored first, they were soundly defeated, 35–14. After the season, the team and the league ceased operation.

== 1999 season schedule ==
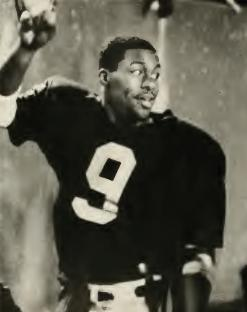
Cannon quarterback Major Harris

| Date | Opponent | Site | W/L | Score | Attnd. | Ref. |
|---|---|---|---|---|---|---|
| April 18 | Houston Outlaws | Home | L | 17–18 | | |
| April 25 | New Orleans Thunder | Home | W | 34–0 | | |
| May 1 | Shreveport Knights | Away | L | 13–29 | | |
| May 8 | Mississippi Pride | Away | L | 17–20 | 3,500 | |
| May 15 | Houston Outlaws | Away | L | 3–27 | | |
| May 22 | Mobile Admirals | Home‡ | W | 20–17 | | |
| May 29 | New Orleans Thunder | Away | — | cancelled | — | |
| June 6† | Shreveport Knights | Home | W | forfeit | — | |
Playoffs
| June 12 | Mobile Admirals | Away | L | 14–35 | 2,873 | |

† Ohio had been scheduled to host Mississippi on June 6. When Shreveport was unable to use their stadium to host New Orleans on June 5, the league adjusted schedules. Mississippi would host New Orleans on June 5, and Ohio would host Shreveport on June 6. When Shreveport did not travel to Toledo, a forfeit was assessed.
‡ May 22 game played in Charleston, West Virginia.
