= Mobile Wizards =

Arena football team

Logo

General information
- Founded: 2001
- Folded: 2002
- Headquartered: Mobile Civic Center in Mobile, Alabama
- Colors: Deep purple, teal, white

Team history
- Mobile Wizards (2002)

Home fields
- Mobile Civic Center (2002)

League / conference affiliations
- af2 (2002): National Conference (2002); South Division (2002)

The Mobile Wizards were an af2 arena football team that played their home games in Mobile, Alabama at the Mobile Civic Center.

On June 15, 2001, the af2 awarded a franchise to Mobile businessman Norris Armstrong, who ran the team with his wife Beth. The af2 club replaced the Mobile Seagulls in the market, who played the 2000 season in the IPFL and 2001 in the NIFL. The Civic Center (capacity: 10,112) was a hub of activity in early 2000s, as it also hosted the ECHL's Mobile Mysticks and the NBDL's Mobile Revelers.

The Wizards were anything but on the turf or at the box office. They lost all sixteen games they played in 2002, often by ugly scores such as 80–18 and 72–6. They did manage to draw 5,427 – barely half-filling the arena – for their first home game, but averaged less than 2,000 a night the rest of the season, finishing with an average attendance of only 2,342 fans per game. The Wizards disbanded after only one season, making them the only af2 team to never have won a game in their history.

== Season record ==
Season records
Season	W	L	T	Finish	Playoff results
2002	0	16	0	4th NC Southern	--
