= Mobile Admirals =

- Founded: 1998
- Folded: 1999
- League: Regional Football League
- Based in: Mobile, Alabama
- Stadium: Ladd–Peebles Stadium
- Owner: Billy Cox & Jay Graddick
- Head coach: Tom Walsh
- Championships: 1999

The Mobile Admirals were a professional American football team that played during the 1999 season as part of the Regional Football League; the Admirals were the league champions. They played their home games at Ladd–Peebles Stadium in Mobile, Alabama.

The team was announced as one of the league's charter members on November 12, 1998. For their lone season, former Los Angeles Raiders offensive coordinator Tom Walsh served as head coach.

Although the team was scheduled to play a 12-game regular season, poor attendance and sagging revenues would prove too much for the new league. In the shortened regular season, the Admirals had a 6–2 record, then were the top seed in the four-team playoff bracket. After defeating the Mississippi Pride in the semi-finals, the Admirals defeated the Houston Outlaws in the championship game, RFL Bowl I. The team was quarterbacked by Frank Costa and Thad Busby, and running back Sherman Williams was the league MVP. After the season, the league ceased operation.

== 1999 season schedule ==
| Date | Opponent | Site | W/L | Score | Attnd. | Ref. |
|---|---|---|---|---|---|---|
| April 18 | New Orleans Thunder | Away | W | 42–14 | 500 | |
| April 24 | Shreveport Knights | Home | W | 15–7 | 13,256 | |
| May 1 | Houston Outlaws | Home† | W | 10–7 | 10,432 | |
| May 8 | New Orleans Thunder | Home | W | 23–6 | 10,146 | |
| May 15 | Mississippi Pride | Home | W | 36–13 | | |
| May 22 | Ohio Cannon | Away‡ | L | 17–20 | | |
| May 29 | Mississippi Pride | Away | L | 20–28 | 6,500 | |
| June 5 | Houston Outlaws | Home | W | 14–3 | | |
Playoffs
| June 12 | Ohio Cannon | Home | W | 35–14 | 2,873 | |
| June 20 | Houston Outlaws | Home | W | 14–12 | 5,571 | |

† May 1 game played in Mobile due to schedule conflict with Houston's stadium
‡ May 22 game played in Charleston, West Virginia
