= Regional Football League =

Professional American football league

- Most recent season or competition: 1999
- Sport: American football
- Founded: 1997
- First season: 1999
- Folded: 1999
- Commissioner: John "Gus" Bell; Ron Floridia
- No. of teams: 6
- Country: United States
- Headquarters: Framingham, MA; Mobile, AL
- Last champion: Mobile Admirals (1999)
- Broadcaster: none

The Regional Football League (RFL) was an American football minor league formed to be the self-styled "major league of spring football." Established in 1997, the league played a single season, 1999, and then ceased operations.

== History ==
The RFL season was designed for spring-summer play with teams based primarily in the Southern United States. The debut season was originally slated to begin in March 1998, however this was delayed by a year. The league adopted rules consistent with professional football of the era, with some exceptions:

- running clock until the last two minutes of each half
- one offensive player allowed to be in motion towards the line of scrimmage at the snap
- ball placed at the 20-yard-line for extra point attempts
- receivers only need one foot in bounds to complete a catch

The league's inaugural (and only) season was 1999, where each of its six teams was scheduled to have training camp and two preseason games in early April, followed by 12 regular season games; a postseason would follow in July. The league held its first regular season games on April 17, 1999. Financial constraints forced the league to reduce player salaries at the end of April, due to low attendance at games. In late May, the league announced that the regular season would be shortened by three games, with the championship game held in late June. Ultimately, the league only played an eight-week regular season. Near the end of the shortened season, the league cancelled a contest between New Orleans and Ohio, and Shreveport forfeited a game, both due to financial concerns. Four teams qualified for the playoffs, and on June 20, 1999, the Mobile Admirals defeated the Houston Outlaws, 14–12, in the championship game, RFL Bowl I, which was played at Ladd–Peebles Stadium in Mobile, Alabama.

RFL rosters were limited to 37 active players and five practice squad members with salaries in the range of $30,000 to $65,000 per player and team salary caps of $1,500,000. The league held a draft where each team could only draft from their respective region in hopes that fans would turn out to see players they'd followed in college. Players who had been with college football programs in the south such as Jason Martin (Louisiana Tech), Stewart Patridge (Ole Miss), Raymond Philyaw (Northeast Louisiana), Marquette Smith (Central Florida) and Sherman Williams (Alabama) were signed to southern RFL teams, while players like Ricky Powers (Michigan), Corey Croom (Ball State), and Skip Tramontana (Miami University) were assigned to the Ohio franchise based in Toledo. Patridge, playing for Mississippi, was the all-RFL quarterback, while running back Williams was the league MVP with Mobile. This regional approach worked at the outset of play, as evidenced fan interest in the league at the start of the season.

The first commissioner of the league was John "Gus" Bell, who was succeeded by Ron Floridia in May 1999. The league did not secure a television contract, and only one game was ever televised—the May 8, 1999, New Orleans Thunder at Mobile Admirals contest on WHNO, a mainly-religious television station in New Orleans.

Despite some efforts made to resume play for a second season, the league folded after its shortened 1999 season. The announced beginning of the XFL for 2001 precluded any realistic chance of the league resuming operations.

== Teams ==
The league's six charter members were announced on November 12, 1998. They participated in the league's only season, which ran from April to June 1999.

RFL teams

Team	City	Stadium	Head coach
Houston Outlaws	Houston, Texas	Pasadena Memorial Stadium	Ray Woodard
Mississippi Pride	Jackson, Mississippi	Mississippi Veterans Memorial Stadium	Johnny Plummer
Mobile Admirals	Mobile, Alabama	Ladd–Peebles Stadium	Tom Walsh
New Orleans Thunder	New Orleans, Louisiana	Tad Gormley Stadium	Rex Stevenson / Buford Jordan
Ohio Cannon	Toledo, Ohio	Glass Bowl	Lew Carpenter
Shreveport Knights	Shreveport, Louisiana	Independence Stadium	Fred Akers

=== Regular season ===
	vs. HOU	vs. MISS	vs. MOBL	vs. N.O.	vs. OHIO	vs. SHRV	Forfeit	Overall	Win pct.
HOU	—	1–0	0–2	1–0	2–0	2–0	—	6–2	.750
MISS	0–1	—	1–1	1–1	1–0	1–1	—	4–4	.500
MOBL	2–0	1–1	—	2–0	0–1	1–0	—	6–2	.750
N.O.	0–1	1–1	0–2	—	0–1	0–1	—	1–6	.143
OHIO	0–2	0–1	1–0	1–0	—	0–1	W	3–4	.429
SHRV	0–2	1–1	0–1	1–0	1–0	—	L	3–5	.375

Notes:

- In the seventh week of the regular season, a contest between New Orleans and Ohio was cancelled by the league.
- In the eighth and final week of the regular season, Shreveport was unable to play in their home stadium. The league rescheduled their intended opponent, New Orleans, to play at Mississippi, and when Shreveport did not travel to play at Ohio, they were assessed a forfeit.

=== Playoffs ===
Semi-finals; June 12
1	Mobile	35
4	Ohio	14
2	Houston	27
3	Mississippi	3

RFL Bowl I June 20
1	Mobile	14
2	Houston	12

Games were hosted by the higher-seeded team.

=== Projected expansion teams ===
Proposed for the 2000 season, which was not played.

- Buffalo, New York
- Orlando, Florida
- San Jose, California
- Winston-Salem, North Carolina

Dallas and Monterey, Mexico were originally eyed for expansion, but dropped at the initial stages.
