= 1992 Indianapolis Colts season =

40th season in franchise history

- Owner: Robert Irsay
- Head coach: Ted Marchibroda
- Offensive coordinator: Nick Nicolau
- Defensive coordinator: Rick Venturi
- Home stadium: Hoosier Dome

Results
- Record: 9–7
- Division place: 3rd AFC East
- Playoffs: Did not qualify

The 1992 Indianapolis Colts season was the 40th season for the team in the National Football League and ninth in Indianapolis. The Colts looked to improve on their dismal 1991 season, where they finished 1–15.

The Colts improved by eight games, recording a 9–7 record, and finished third in the AFC East division. It was the team's first season under the returning Ted Marchibroda, who had spent the previous five seasons as the quarterbacks coach and later offensive coordinator for the Buffalo Bills; Marchibroda had been the head coach of the team from 1975 until 1979 when it was in Baltimore. Marchibroda succeeded interim coach Rick Venturi, who coached the last eleven games of the 1991 season following the firing of Ron Meyer. Venturi remained on Marchibroda's staff as defensive coordinator.

Football Outsiders calls the 1992 Colts "possibly the luckiest team in NFL history", due to ranking the Colts as the second worst team in 1992, statistically.

The Colts finished 9–7 even though opponents outscored them 302–216

Football Outsiders continued,

They were 4–7 after losing 30–14 to Pittsburgh on November 22. Then they finished the year with a five-game winning streak – but they won those games by an average of four points. ... It didn't hurt that the Colts recovered 59 percent of fumbles that season and had a below-average schedule.

The Colts' 1,102 rushing yards is the lowest for any team in a single season in the 1990s.

== Offseason ==
On April 26, 1992, the Colts parted ways with Eric Dickerson after five seasons, trading him to the Los Angeles Raiders. Although they had gone to great lengths to acquire him in 1987 and he led the NFL in rushing while playing for them in 1988, the Colts' relationship with Dickerson soured during the 1990 season and he was suspended twice for conduct detrimental to the team. Dickerson was also unhappy with the Colts' fans blaming him for the team's lack of success and was said to be angry over the team's firing of Ron Meyer, his former college coach, during the previous season.

=== NFL draft ===
1992 Indianapolis Colts draft
Round	Pick	Player	Position	College	Notes
1	1	Steve Emtman	Defensive end	Washington	
1	2	Quentin Coryatt	Linebacker	Texas A&M	
2	29	Ashley Ambrose *	Cornerback	Mississippi Valley State	
4	85	Rodney Culver	Running back	Notre Dame	
4	105	Tony McCoy	Defensive tackle	Florida	
5	113	Maury Toy	Running back	UCLA	
6	141	Shoun Habersham	Wide receiver	Chattanooga	
7	169	Derek Steele	Defensive end	Maryland	
8	197	Jason Belser	Safety	Oklahoma	
8	212	Ronald Humphrey	Running back	Mississippi Valley State	
9	225	Eddie Miller	Wide receiver	South Carolina	
10	253	Steve Grant	Linebacker	West Virginia	
12	309	Michael Brandon	Defensive end	Florida	
Made roster * Made at least one Pro Bowl during career

=== Undrafted free agents ===
1992 undrafted free agents of note
Player	Position	College
Derrick Franklin	Running back	Indiana State
Errol McCorvey	Defensive back	Florida State
Isaac Morehouse	Defensive back	Jackson State
John Ray	Tackle	West Virginia
Alec Thomas	Defensive back	Auburn
James Williams	Defensive back	Texas Southern

== Personnel ==
=== Staff ===
1992 Indianapolis Colts staff
Front office: President/treasurer – Robert Irsay; Vice president/general manager – Jim Irsay; Assistant general manager – Bob Terpening; Director of player personnel – Jack Bushofsky; Head coaches: Head coach – Ted Marchibroda; Offensive coaches: Offensive coordinator – Nick Nicolau; Running backs – Gene Huey; Receivers – Dwain Painter; Tight ends – Brad Seely; Offensive line – Alex Gibbs; Offensive assistant – Ron Blackledge	Defensive coaches: Defensive coordinator/linebackers – Rick Venturi; Defensive line – Francis Peay; Secondary – George Catavolos; Defensive assistant – Jay Robertson; Special teams coaches: Special teams – Brad Seely; Strength and conditioning: Strength and conditioning – Tom Zupancic

=== Roster ===
1992 Indianapolis Colts roster
Quarterbacks (QB): 11 Jeff George; 10 Jack Trudeau; 7 Tom Tupa; Running backs (RB): 44 Maurice Carthon; 32 Ken Clark; 35 Rodney Culver; 23 Anthony Johnson; 28 Ed Toner; Wide receivers (WR): 80 Bill Brooks; 84 Jessie Hester; 85 Reggie Langhorne; 86 Eddie Miller; 83 Clarence Verdin; Tight ends (TE): 81 Charles Arbuckle; 88 Kerry Cash	Offensive linemen (OL): 71 Kevin Call T; 69 Randy Dixon G; 53 Ray Donaldson C; 75 Ron Mattes T; 73 Zefross Moss T; 74 Bill Schultz G; 68 Joe Staysniak G; 72 Mark Vander Poel T; Defensive linemen (DL): 76 Sam Clancy DE; 78 Jon Hand DE; 95 Skip McClendon DE; 94 Tony McCoy NT; 96 Willis Peguese DE; 98 Tony Siragusa NT	Linebackers (LB): 51 Chip Banks OLB; 50 Duane Bickett OLB; 59 Steve Grant LB; 54 Jeff Herrod ILB; 97 Scott Radecic ILB; 58 Matt Vanderbeek LB; 92 Tony Walker OLB; Defensive backs (DB): 33 Ashley Ambrose CB; 31 Michael Ball SS; 36 John Baylor SS; 29 Jason Belser SS; 38 Eugene Daniel CB; 37 Chris Goode CB; 39 Mike Prior FS; 45 Tony Stargell CB; Special teams (ST): 4 Dean Biasucci K; 64 Trevor Matich LS; 3 Rohn Stark P	Practice squad: 56 Michael Heldt C; 25 Ronald Humphrey RB; 52 Tim Paulk LB; Reserve: 55 Quentin Coryatt LB (IR); 79 Steve Emtman DE (IR); 66 Ron Solt G (IR); Rookies in italics 47 active, 3 reserve, 3 practice squad

== Regular season ==
=== Schedule ===
Week	Date	Opponent	Result	Record	Venue	Attendance
1	September 6	Cleveland Browns	**W** 14–3	1–0	Hoosier Dome	50,766
2	September 13	Houston Oilers	**L** 10–20	1–1	Hoosier Dome	44,851
3	September 20	at **Buffalo Bills**	**L** 0–38	1–2	Rich Stadium	77,781
4	Bye					
5	October 4	at Tampa Bay Buccaneers	**W** 24–14	2–2	Tampa Stadium	56,585
6	October 11	**New York Jets**	**W** 6–3 (OT)	3–2	Hoosier Dome	48,393
7	October 18	San Diego Chargers	**L** 14–34	3–3	Hoosier Dome	48,552
8	October 25	at **Miami Dolphins**	**W** 31–20	4–3	Joe Robbie Stadium	61,117
9	November 1	at San Diego Chargers	**L** 0–26	4–4	Jack Murphy Stadium	40,324
10	November 8	**Miami Dolphins**	**L** 0–28	4–5	Hoosier Dome	59,892
11	November 15	**New England Patriots**	**L** 34–37 (OT)	4–6	Hoosier Dome	42,631
12	November 22	at Pittsburgh Steelers	**L** 14–30	4–7	Three Rivers Stadium	51,101
13	November 29	**Buffalo Bills**	**W** 16–13 (OT)	5–7	Hoosier Dome	50,221
14	December 6	at **New England Patriots**	**W** 6–0	6–7	Foxboro Stadium	19,429
15	December 13	at **New York Jets**	**W** 10–6	7–7	Giants Stadium	33,684
16	December 20	Phoenix Cardinals	**W** 16–13	8–7	Hoosier Dome	46,763
17	December 27	at Cincinnati Bengals	**W** 21–17	9–7	Riverfront Stadium	47,837
Note: Intra-division opponents are in **bold** text.

== Standings ==
AFC East
	W	L	T	PCT	DIV	CONF	PF	PA	STK
^{(2)} Miami Dolphins	11	5	0	.688	5–3	9–3	340	281	W3
^{(4)} Buffalo Bills	11	5	0	.688	5–3	7–5	381	283	L1
Indianapolis Colts	9	7	0	.563	5–3	7–7	216	302	W5
New York Jets	4	12	0	.250	3–5	4–8	220	315	L3
New England Patriots	2	14	0	.125	2–6	2–10	205	363	L5

== See also ==
- History of the Indianapolis Colts
- Indianapolis Colts seasons
- Colts–Patriots rivalry
