= World Football League =

Former American football league (1974–1975)

- WFL official logo
- Sport: American football
- Founded: 1973; 53 years ago
- First season: 1974
- Folded: 1975; 51 years ago
- No. of teams: 13 (all)
- Country: United States
- Last champion: Birmingham Americans

The World Football League (WFL) was an American football league that played one full season in 1974 and most of its second in 1975. Although the league's proclaimed ambition was to bring American football onto a worldwide stage, only one team – the Hawaiians in Honolulu, Hawaii – was headquartered outside of continental North America. The league folded in 1975 midway through its second season.

== History ==
Gary Davidson, a California lawyer and businessman, was the driving force behind the World Football League. He had helped start the moderately successful American Basketball Association and World Hockey Association, some of whose teams survived long enough to enter the more established National Basketball Association and National Hockey League, respectively. Unlike his two previous efforts, the World Football League did not bring any surviving teams into the National Football League.

To get the league off the ground, Davidson knew that he needed investors. At a press conference held in Chicago on October 2, 1973, Davidson announced his core of investors, a group of men he called the "founding fathers". These men were Robert Schmertz, who owned the WHA's New England Whalers and NBA's Boston Celtics; a former hockey prospect named Howard Baldwin (future owner of the NHL's Pittsburgh Penguins), who ran the Boston Bulls charter; Ben Hatskin, who owned the WHA's Winnipeg Jets; and R. Steve Arnold, another WHA associate.

Perhaps one of the biggest of the "founding fathers" was a Canadian movie producer, John F. Bassett. A former tennis prodigy and owner of the WHA's Toronto Toros, Bassett came from a wealthy Canadian family. The family owned (among other entities) the Toronto Argonauts of the Canadian Football League, two Toronto newspapers and interests in television stations. The younger Bassett had been mulling over starting his own professional football league when he happened to meet Davidson and he was given a franchise for Toronto. Bassett went on to own a team in another alternative football league, the USFL's Tampa Bay Bandits in the mid-1980s.

Along with the original founding fathers, the rest of the owners soon fell into place, including a man whose own dreams of playing football were ended by a heart ailment, Thomas Origer, who later ran the Chicago Fire.

Several prospective owners were forced to drop out. Davidson was willing to sell his Philadelphia team to investor Harry Jay Katz, before learning that Katz didn't have the strong resources that he claimed, and was in fact the target of several lawsuits, and rescinded his offer to sell the rights to Philadelphia. He nearly sold the Detroit franchise to Bud Huchul, but it was later discovered Huchul had been arrested 30 times and faced 27 lawsuits related to his previous business dealings.

Davidson had initially planned for his league to commence play in 1975. However, the league came under pressure to accelerate its timetable, largely on account of strained labor relations affecting both established professional leagues. In the spring of 1974, players were threatening to go on strike in both the NFL and CFL, which could have delayed the start of their seasons and/or caused the quality of their product to deteriorate if owners attempted to bring in replacement players.

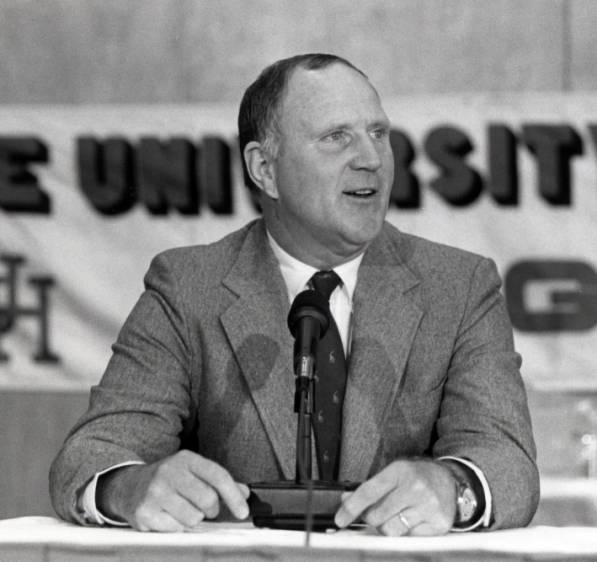
Jack Pardee served as head coach of the Florida Blazers in 1974.

The possibility of being the only major professional football league in operation (or, at least, the possibility that the quality of WFL football might be compared favorably with that of established league rosters filled with "scab" players) appeared to be too good an opportunity to pass up – combined with rumors of another upstart league, it persuaded Davidson to advance the new league's planned debut to 1974.

One team went through several identities. The team slated to play in Maryland was to be called the Washington Capitals, but the expansion NHL team had already trademarked the rights to the nickname. A contest held to name the team came up with the name Ambassadors. The team then became the Baltimore-Washington Ambassadors, and then the Baltimore name was dropped, and the team simply became known as the Washington Ambassadors. In order to boost ticket sales, Washington owner Joe Wheeler offered former Baltimore Colts quarterback Johnny Unitas a contract as head coach and general manager of the team, but Unitas declined as he was already under contract with the San Diego Chargers; he retired at the end of the 1973 season. Wheeler then made the same offer to Redskins linebacker Jack Pardee, who quickly signed with the new league.

In the meantime, Wheeler had engaged in a war for territory with Pardee's old boss, Redskins owner Edward Bennett Williams. Wheeler wanted the Ambassadors to play at RFK Stadium, but Williams refused to allow it, and the Ambassadors were on the move. Without ever stepping on the field, the team went through their third relocation, starting off as the Baltimore-Washington Ambassadors, then becoming the Washington Ambassadors, and finally the Virginia Ambassadors.

=== Competing for NFL players ===
The fledgling WFL did succeed in raising stagnant salaries in the NFL. Average salaries in professional football were among the lowest in the four major North American sports, and the National Football League Players Association and the Canadian Football League Players Association had both gone on strike prior to their leagues' respective 1974 seasons in an effort to lift many of the rules suppressing free agency and player salaries. In addition, the NFL did not have a free agency system in place then (and one was not established until 1993).

With the uncertain labor situation, the WFL had the opportunity to provide players with a better deal than the established leagues would give them, along with the promise of employment. Davidson's league garnered major publicity when the Toronto Northmen, led by John F. Bassett, signed three Miami Dolphins players, fullback Larry Csonka, halfback Jim Kiick, and wide receiver Paul Warfield to what was then the richest three-player deal in sports, an astounding US$3.5 million to start in 1975. The pact was a guaranteed, personal-services contract, so the trio would be paid even if the WFL did not survive its first season.

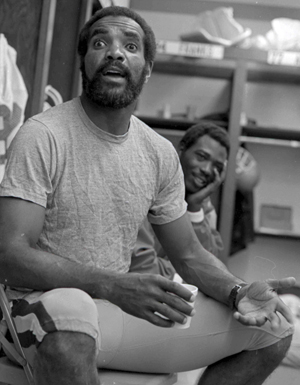
Running back Calvin Hill played for The Hawaiians in 1975.

The NFL took notice, as did their players when they were approached to jump leagues. The Oakland Raiders nearly lost both their quarterbacks. Ken Stabler signed with the Birmingham Americans, and Daryle Lamonica penned a contract to play for the Southern California Sun starting in 1975. John Wilbur left the Over-the-Hill Gang as a Washington Redskin to invest, coach special teams, and play for the Hawaiians. The Dallas Cowboys also took roster hits when WFL teams in Hawaii and Houston signed running back Calvin Hill and quarterback Craig Morton respectively. The Hawaiians also signed Minnesota Vikings Pro Bowl WR John Gilliam and San Francisco 49ers All-Pro TE Ted Kwalick; however, Gilliam ended up with the Chicago Winds and Kwalick signed with the Philadelphia Bell prior to the 1975 season.

By early June 1974, the WFL claimed they had some 60 NFL players under contract. Many of these defections came in the form of futures contracts. The players would play out their existing deals with the NFL, then jump to the WFL when those deals expired. Thus, Stabler planned to stay with the Raiders through 1975, then would have joined Birmingham in 1976 had the team and league survived that long.

=== 1974 season ===
Playing a 20-game regular season schedule in 1974 – six games longer than the NFL's then 14-game slate – the WFL staged no exhibition games (although their teams did participate in preseason scrimmages).

The season was scheduled to begin on Wednesday, July 10 and end on Wednesday, November 13. This was a 20-game season in 19 weeks – a schedule accomplished by having double games (primarily Monday and Friday) on Labor Day weekend.

Some complained that the schedule was poorly drafted: although most teams played on Wednesday nights with a national TV game slated for Thursday nights, the Hawaiians played their home games on Sunday afternoons, meaning when the Hawaiians had a home game, they played an opponent who flew to Honolulu after having played just four days earlier. In addition, back-to-back meetings between two teams were common.

The WFL held a college draft. The first six rounds were held on January 22, 1974, with the remaining 30 rounds held on February 5. David Jaynes, quarterback from Kansas, was the first player selected in the draft by the original Memphis franchise that became the Houston Texans by the time the season started.

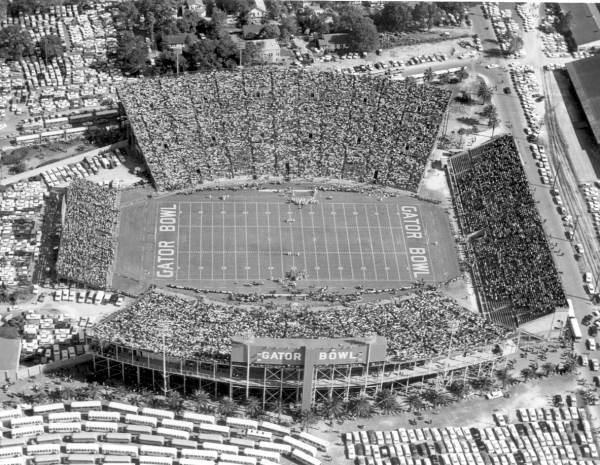
Gator Bowl Stadium, planned site of the first World Bowl

As was common with many upstart leagues, the WFL's intended lineup of teams changed several times before they even played a down. Most notably, Bassett's Toronto Northmen were forced to find a new home after the Canadian government threatened to ban any American football team from competing with the CFL. Though the Canadian Football Act never passed, the mere threat of it prompted Bassett to move the team to Memphis, where it became the Memphis Southmen. It was generally referred to by fans, local media, and even some official team materials as the Grizzlies, which they officially renamed themselves to the following season (not to be confused with the current NBA team of the same name). The WFL suffered an even more serious blow when the CFL and NFL reached agreements with their striking players that ensured that the upstart league would be forced to compete with both of their established rivals.

The original schedule called for a four-team playoff, with semifinal games held on Wednesday–Thursday November 20–November 21, and the World Bowl on Friday, November 29 (the night after Thanksgiving) at the Gator Bowl Stadium in Jacksonville, Florida. League officials also boldly discussed plans for expansion teams in Europe and Asia.

In the first few weeks, the WFL looked to be a resounding success. Attendance outpaced the first week of the American Football League in 1960, averaging just under 43,000 a game. The box office numbers proved to be the beginning of the WFL's undoing when two teams admitted to inflating their gates on a scale virtually unprecedented in major league sports. The Philadelphia Bell's first two home games totaled 120,253 fans. However, when they paid city taxes on those gates, they admitted that 100,198 of the tickets had been given away for free or sold at significantly reduced prices. WFL officials subsequently admitted they not only knew the Bell were inflating their attendance, but that Davidson himself had approved the scheme. The Jacksonville Sharks admitted that out of the 105,892 fans who attended their first two games, 30,000 had gotten in for free. The giveaways were intended in part to pique the public's curiosity and interest, and in the Bell's case were done to keep their crowds from being swallowed up in the cavernous environment of 100,000-seat John F. Kennedy Stadium. However, they ended up seriously eroding the credibility of both the teams and the league.

Six games into the first season, a number of WFL franchises were in serious trouble. The Detroit Wheels were looking to move to Charlotte, and the Florida Blazers made overtures of bringing the first place club to Atlanta. In September, two franchises relocated in mid-season. The Houston Texans moved to Shreveport, Louisiana, as the Shreveport Steamer, and they were followed a week later by the New York Stars, who relocated to Charlotte and became the Charlotte Hornets (also not to be confused with the present-day NBA franchise of the same name; they played one road game after the official move still under the "Stars" name). On top of this, the Wheels moved one game to London, Ontario due to poor ticket sales, this time without any complaints from Canadian officials.

It was discovered that in the rush to commence play in 1974, several WFL teams had paid less than the original $120,000 franchise fee in order to meet Davidson's target of 12 teams. Additionally, league officials had conducted little to no due diligence. As a result, most of the league's teams were badly undercapitalized. By most accounts, the only reasonably well-financed teams were Memphis, Philadelphia, the Hawaiians and Southern California.

In many cases, WFL teams were unable to meet the most basic team expenses. For instance, the Portland Storm's players were reportedly being fed by sympathetic local fans. The Hornets had their uniforms impounded for not paying a laundry bill from the time the team was located in New York and were not paid regularly after the third week in October. The Birmingham Americans were not paid for the last two months of the season, the Florida Blazers went three months without pay (and reportedly survived on McDonald's meal vouchers), and the Sharks were not paid for what turned out to be their last six games. The other teams' finances were not much better, as the Southmen, Bell and Hawaiians were the only teams who met payroll for every week of the season.

The most dire situation, however, was that of the Detroit Wheels. The team's original 33 owners appeared to pay for team expenses out of pocket as they arose, resulting in what amounted to a club football team playing at the professional level. On several occasions, the team was left without uniforms when they did not pay the cleaning bill, forcing them to cancel practices. After several hotels and airlines went unpaid, the Wheels were also unable to fly to games or get a place for the players to stay without paying in advance. One player was forced to pay a hospital bill for his son out of pocket after being informed the team's insurance policy had been cancelled for non-payment of premiums. The owners refused to provide filming equipment for the coaches.

The Wheels seemingly bottomed out when they arrived in Philadelphia to face the Bell. The players discovered that there were no medical supplies or tape available, and initially refused to take the field. When it looked like the Wheels would have to forfeit, a salesman at the game donated enough tape to allow them to play. The league was forced to take over the team after complaints from the players.

Perhaps one of the most bizarre incidents for the WFL in 1974 involved defensive end John Matuszak, who had jumped from the NFL's Houston Oilers to play for the WFL's Houston Texans. While Matuszak worked out on the field prior to a game against the New York Stars, attorneys for the Oilers and federal marshals arrived at the stadium: five minutes into the first quarter, shortly after sacking Stars quarterback Tom Sherman for a 13-yard loss, Matuszak was benched—the Texans had been served with a restraining order that barred Matuszak from playing another down for the Texans until his Oilers contract expired at the end of the 1977 NFL season. Afterwards, Matuszak waved the document to show the stunned home crowd why he was sitting on the bench, while the Oilers, who were angered at this debacle, subsequently traded Matuszak to the Kansas City Chiefs.

The league seemingly bottomed out in October when it shut down the Wheels and the Sharks after 14 games. The collapse of the Sharks meant that the Gator Bowl did not host World Bowl I; coincidentally, Jacksonville was also slated to be the host of the 1986 USFL Championship Game, but the USFL folded before that season began. It was not until February 2005 that the city hosted its first championship pro football game, Super Bowl XXXIX.

Davidson was forced to resign in October 1974, and Hawaiians owner Christopher Hemmeter was named the new commissioner a month later.

Late in the year, the league announced that it would award its Most Valuable Player a prize of $10,000 at the World Bowl. Rather than endure the embarrassment of media sneers about whether a WFL check would clear, the league neatly stacked $10,000 in cash high upon a table in the middle of the field. The MVP award was a three-way split, and the players involved split the cash.

The playoff format itself was also chaotic: numerous playoff formats were tossed around, including brackets ranging from three to eight teams, with one owner proposing the World Bowl be canceled and the championship handed to the regular-season champion Memphis Southmen.

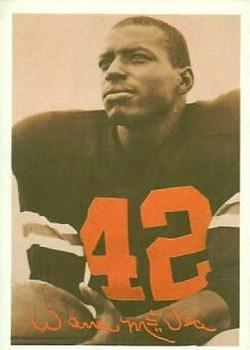
Running back Warren McVea began the 1974 season with Detroit but was traded to Houston a month into the season.

Eventually, six teams were chosen for the postseason. The two teams with the best regular-season records, Memphis and Birmingham, were awarded first-round byes. The other two division winners would play in first-round games against the runners-up in their division. Originally, Florida was to host Charlotte, while Southern California was to host the Hawaiians.

However, after being informed only 1,000 advance tickets had been sold for the Hornets' matchup against the Blazers, league officials feared attendance would have been too small for the financially strapped Hornets to meet their travel expenses. The Hornet players would have been lucky to get $100 for the game, nowhere near enough to justify the trip to Orlando. The Hornets were forced to pull out of the playoffs and allow the Bell to advance in their place. Despite the fallout from "Papergate", the Bell were slightly more robustly funded and could cover their travel costs.

Despite the various disasters, many thought the WFL performed fairly well, though below NFL standards. Many games were tight, decided by seven points or less, and the Action Point, the one-point conversion run or pass attempt after a touchdown, was favored among WFL coaches and critics. The league championship—the World Bowl, or "World Bowl I"—was staged in Birmingham between the hometown Birmingham Americans and the Florida Blazers.

Not even the World Bowl could go off without a hitch. For a time, it appeared that the game would not take place because the Americans owed $237,000 in back federal taxes. However, the Internal Revenue Service agreed to let the game go ahead in return for a portion of the gate. Both teams were owed several weeks' back pay; the Americans only agreed to play when their owner promised them championship rings if they won.

Aside from the money woes the league was having, the players did not hold back in complaining about the officiating during the game. Blazers running back Tommy Reamon scored what he thought was a touchdown, but the officials on the field ruled that he fumbled the ball out of the end zone before he hit the ground, resulting in a touchback that gave the ball to Birmingham. Replays clearly showed that the ball had broken the plane of the end zone before slipping out of Reamon's hands. While the phantom turnover did not account for any Birmingham points, it did serve to break the spirits of the Blazers. Birmingham led 15–0, with Birmingham quarterback Matthew Reed scoring an action point. Birmingham led 22–0, and thought they had the game wrapped up. However, Florida managed a small comeback, trailing 22–21 as the gun went off in the fourth quarter. After the game, the Americans' jerseys were seized to satisfy team debts, and Sports Illustrated prophetically referred to the game as "The first, and possibly only World Bowl".

As if losing a championship game in a squeaker was not bad enough, things got much worse. Florida head coach Jack Pardee bolted back to the NFL to take over the Chicago Bears, and the Blazers' franchise was sold off at a court-ordered auction after it was discovered that Blazers part-owner Rommie Loudd had financed the team through selling cocaine and a tax evasion scheme, for which he was arrested shortly after the season (and later convicted).

The champions did not fare much better—‌only days after the World Bowl, the Americans' office furniture was repossessed by sheriff's deputies.

The financial losses were tremendous: the Hawaiians had lost $3.2 million, while the New York Stars/Charlotte Hornets had over $2 million of debt against just $94,000 in assets, and the Jacksonville Sharks and Detroit Wheels were liquidated owing nearly $4 million—‌Detroit had 122 creditors looking to recoup losses.

Many NFL stars who had been attracted to the league quickly sought to get out of their contracts. Quarterback Ken Stabler (Raiders), defensive end L. C. Greenwood (Steelers), and quarterback Craig Morton (Giants) all were able to get courts to nullify their contracts with WFL teams, while former NFL veterans like George Sauer Jr., Charley Harraway, Leroy Kelly, and Don Maynard all retired.

Many players, such as quarterbacks Tony Adams, Danny White, and wideout Alfred Jenkins entered the NFL, with Adams joining the Kansas City Chiefs, White joining the Dallas Cowboys, and Jenkins joining the Atlanta Falcons; Florida head coach Jack Pardee also was able to get star Blazers' tight end Greg Latta to leave with him and join the NFL's Bears.

=== 1975 season ===
Though many predicted the WFL was dead, the league returned for the 1975 season. During the offseason, Hemmeter developed a plan to restore a measure of financial sanity to the league by paying players and coaches based on a percentage of revenues, while imposing strict capitalization requirements on the teams. Several markets from 1974 returned under new team names and new ownership. The deceased Sharks of Jacksonville came back as the 'Express.' The Portland Storm became the Portland Thunder, the Birmingham Americans were replaced by the Vulcans, and the Chicago Fire became the Winds. The World Bowl runner-up Florida Blazers folded, and their franchise rights were relocated to San Antonio, Texas, as the San Antonio Wings. Akron, Ohio was briefly mentioned as a location for the twelfth WFL team (the replacement for the Wheels), but this never materialized, and only 11 teams played in the 1975 season. Only two teams, Memphis and Philadelphia, returned with the same ownership from the prior season. Sports Illustrated, in its postmortem, noted that the change between 1974 and 1975 was so drastic that for all intents and purposes, the WFL of 1975 was a nearly completely different entity than its predecessor. The WFL of 1974 was described as a bombastic credit risk, while the WFL of 1975 was a safer but much quieter entity that failed because it was ignored.

An idea produced by the league was to have players wear different colors of pants based on their position. Offensive linemen were to wear purple pants, running backs green pants, receivers blue pants, linebackers red, and defensive backs yellow. Quarterbacks and kickers were to wear white pants. In addition to the colors, the pants were also adorned with items such as pinstripes (for the offensive linemen) or large stars (for quarterbacks) for those not watching on color television. After a test run in preseason games, this idea was scrapped.

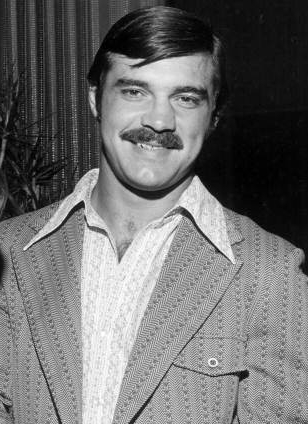
Fullback Larry Csonka played for the Memphis Southmen in 1975.

The league changed the scheduling format from 20 games without exhibitions to 18 games (played in 20 weeks due to the odd number of teams) with exhibitions. Gone were weeknight games; the new schedule had games on Fridays, Saturdays, and Sundays. But there were still problems, as although the original plan called for a July 5 preseason opener and August 2 regular season openers, the regular season had to open a week earlier, with a single game on Saturday, July 26, due to a stadium conflict. This meant that a single regular season game was played in the midst of the last weekend of preseason play (with some preseason games being played the next night).

Several more NFL free agents, including Calvin Hill and Ted Kwalick, signed on with the struggling WFL. Memphis had secured three top-line, but fading Dolphins stars in Larry Csonka, Jim Kiick, and Paul Warfield. The Southern California Sun secured the services of former AFL and NFL quarterback Daryle Lamonica.

The Chicago Winds made an offer to aging Super Bowl III MVP Joe Namath, who seriously considered the offer, before refusing and re-signing with the New York Jets. The Winds invested considerable money and time in the effort to sign Namath (the team even designed its uniform to emulate the Jets'), and all but promised he was coming to Chicago. The embarrassing rejection by Namath crippled the Winds, who were shut down five weeks into the season. It also resulted in the loss of the WFL's national television deal (see below), rendering the league all but invisible.

Despite Hemmeter's efforts, several teams soon ran into financial difficulties, in part due to alarmingly low attendance figures. (The WFL averaged 21,423 fans per game in 1974, but only 13,931 per contest in '75.) The Winds were shut down five games into the season after dropping below league capitalization requirements, leaving the league with ten teams (which itself was a convenience, because it eliminated the mandatory bye week). It was not enough to stem the tide; by late October rumors abounded that four of the remaining teams were on the verge of folding.

On Wednesday, October 22, a few days before the start of week 13, the WFL ceased operations. Hemmeter said that the league would have needed to spend as much as $40 million over two years to be successful, a bill that the league's directors, seven of whom sat on the boards of banks, did not feel could be justified. The Birmingham Vulcans, by virtue of their league-best record of 9–3 at the time of the shutdown, were proclaimed league champions.

With the relative financial stability of the Birmingham and Memphis clubs, both attempted to join the NFL but were refused. In 1979, the Memphis club owners filed an anti-trust suit against the NFL. Their case was ultimately dismissed on May 30, 1984, by which time the owners had already established the Tampa Bay Bandits in the next professional league, the United States Football League (then in the midst of its second season; that league incidentally filed their own, more famous antitrust suit against the NFL in 1986). Although the NFL expanded by two teams in 1976, that expansion had been planned before the WFL's first season, and neither city (Tampa and Seattle) had hosted a WFL franchise.

One of the issues facing the WFL going into 1975 was how to hold a draft. The owners of the WFL teams collectively agreed they did not have the money to seek out the top college prospects. Instead, the league came up with a different plan. Instead of drafting a certain player, a WFL team would draft an entire NFL or CFL team. This gave that team the rights to negotiate with players under contract for that team. For example, only the Charlotte Hornets had the right to offer contracts to players from the Buffalo Bills, Baltimore Colts, and Detroit Lions, and only the Chicago Winds could offer contracts to players from the Pittsburgh Steelers, New York Jets, and Edmonton Eskimos of the Canadian Football League.

=== Legacy ===
The league's struggles led to endless sarcastic comments (starting with the league's own abbreviation, which was often pronounced "Wiffle"). Chicago Fire offensive lineman Steve Wright quipped that he had been offered a million dollar contract: "A dollar a year for a million years!"

In the 1976 season, Memphis Southmen coach John McVay joined the staff of the New York Giants and brought with him nine players from the Southmen. In what has been described as "the closest approximation to a meeting between the champions of the WFL and the NFL" (even though the Southmen never won a WFL title), the Southmen-reinforced Giants upset the defending Super Bowl champion Pittsburgh Steelers, 17–0, in a preseason match that year.

The WFL, for all its embarrassing miscues, produced a number of coaches who found success in the NFL, notably Jack Pardee, Lindy Infante, and Marty Schottenheimer. Jim Fassel, a quarterback for the Hawaiians, became a head coach in the NFL and UFL, taking the New York Giants to Super Bowl XXXV in 2001 and the Las Vegas Locomotives to a win in the 2009 UFL Championship Game. McVay worked his way up the Giants organization and eventually became the team's head coach; he had even more success as general manager of the San Francisco 49ers during the 1980s dynasty years. Several players, most notably Pat Haden, Danny White, Alfred Jenkins, Greg Latta, and Vince Papale, later found success in the NFL as well.

Four WFL alumni made it to the Pro Football Hall of Fame: Larry Csonka, Paul Warfield, Leroy Kelly and Don Maynard; all four were already established stars in the NFL before joining the WFL.

The league's most severe impact was on the Miami Dolphins, who had just won consecutive Super Bowls before the WFL's snagging of three of their star players. This changed the course of NFL history, by opening the door to dominance by two other AFC teams, the Steelers and the Raiders, during the second half of the 1970s.

While by no means the pioneer of "singular" team nicknames, which had been used by some college and professional sports teams since the 19th century, the high quantity of them in a single league ("Fire", "Sun", "Bell", "Storm", "Steamer", "Thunder", "Express") was rare in professional sports at the time, and was a distinguishing mark of the league.

The WFL also arguably affected locations of other professional football teams: from the NFL, Hawaii hosted the Pro Bowl from 1980 through 2009 and again from 2011 to 2016, Jacksonville got the Jacksonville Jaguars in 1995, Charlotte received the Carolina Panthers in the same year, and Houston's expansion franchise, the Texans, revived the name of the WFL team in 2002. Though the WFL's Toronto establishment failed due to Canadian resistance, the Buffalo Bills (with Canadian backing and special conditions) played one home game in Toronto a season from 2008 to 2013, and the league's original intent to expand the game globally is being partially fulfilled by the NFL International Series. Other cities became regular stops for franchises in other leagues:

- Memphis hosted the Showboats of the USFL from 1983 to 1985, the Mad Dogs of the CFL in 1995, the XFL's Maniax in 2001, the Express in the AAF in 2019, and another Memphis Showboats in the 2022 USFL and 2024 UFL. The NFL also used Memphis as a temporary home for the Tennessee Oilers in 1997 before their stadium in Nashville was completed.
- Birmingham hosted the Vulcans and Magic of the AFA, Stallions of the USFL, the Fire of the WLAF from 1991 to 1992, Barracudas of the CFL in 1995, the Thunderbolts of the XFL in 2001, the Iron in the AAF in 2019. In 2022, the Birmingham Stallions of the second reiteration of the USFL became the champions of the new league version, a championship it successfully defended the following two seasons.
- Orlando hosted the Americans of the AFA, Renegades of the USFL, Thunder of the WLAF, Rage of the XFL, the Tuskers of the UFL and the Apollos of the AAF, and are currently hosts of the Storm of the 2024 UFL
- Shreveport later hosted the Steamers of the AFA and the Pirates of the CFL.
- Jacksonville hosted the Firebirds of the AFA and the Bulls of the USFL before the NFL Jaguars franchise was awarded. In 2010, Jacksonville received an Arena Football League expansion franchise, which revived the Sharks name.
- Charlotte later hosted the Chargers of the AFA before the NFL Panthers franchise was awarded.
- San Antonio later hosted the Charros of the AFA, Gunslingers of the USFL, the Riders of the WLAF, the Texans of the CFL, the Matadors of the SFL, the Commanders of the AAF, the San Antonio Brahmas of the 2020 XFL and 2024 UFL, and four home games for the NFL New Orleans Saints during their 2005 "road season", in which the Saints had to abandon their usual stadium, the Louisiana Superdome, due to damage from Hurricane Katrina. (San Antonio has also hosted NFL exhibition games.)
- Southern California hosted the Express of the USFL, the Xtreme of the 2001 XFL, the Wildcats in the 2020 XFL, the Dragons of the SFL and was expected to host a franchise in the UFL, a promise that was never fulfilled before the league's sudden shutdown in 2012.
- The New York/New Jersey metropolitan area hosted the New Jersey Generals of the USFL, the New York Sentinels of the UFL, and the Guardians of the 2020 XFL, and two teams that bore both states' names: the Knights of the WLAF and the Hitmen of the 2001 XFL.
- Chicago hosted the Fire of the AFA, Blitz of the USFL and the Enforcers of the 2001 XFL.
- Detroit later hosted the Michigan Panthers in both the 1983-85 and 2022-present incarnations of the USFL and UFL and was targeted as a possibility for XFL expansion before the 2001 XFL folded.
- Portland later hosted the Breakers of the USFL and served as the launching point for the CFL USA initiative with an exhibition game in June 1992, though it never received a CFL team.
- Houston later hosted the Marshals in the SFL and the Roughnecks in the 2020 XFL, along with another Roughnecks in the 2024 UFL.

The NFL's Houston Texans revived the name of the WFL's franchise for that city when it began play in 2002. ("Texans" had been used by an NFL Dallas team in 1952—after it folded, the remnants were taken over by the expansion Baltimore Colts—and by an AFL Dallas team in the early 1960s, which became the Kansas City Chiefs.) The moniker was also used by an arena football team in Dallas in the early 1990s, and by a CFL San Antonio team for one year in the 1990s.

There is also a Major League Soccer team called the Chicago Fire, and there are/were also NBA teams called the Memphis Grizzlies (2001–present) and Charlotte Hornets (1988–2002, 2014–present) (the nickname "Hornets" was used for minor league baseball teams in Charlotte long before the WFL entry; also, the "Grizzlies" name for the Memphis NBA team was in use when the franchise was still in Vancouver). The Jacksonville Sharks and Portland Thunder names were later revived for teams in the 2010 revival of the Arena Football League, with the indoor Sharks (outlasting its namesake by several years) having since moved to the Indoor Football League.

The American Football Association was conceived as a successor to the WFL, and in some newspapers was even referred to as the "New WFL". Many of the AFA teams revived, with slight alterations, the names of WFL teams that had resided in its respective cities, and several of the AFA's key personnel had previously served in similar capacities with WFL teams; the league operated from 1977 to 1983.

The league also caused significant problems for the lower levels of professional football. Its arrival resulted in the end of the ACFL and SFL, effectively killing minor-league professional football in the United States until the AFA's formation in 1979.

== NFL jumpers ==
Several NFL players signed contracts, or in some cases, future contracts with teams in the World Football League. In the case of a future contract, this was when a player entering the final years of a contract with an NFL team would sign a contract with a WFL team that goes into effect the moment the player's obligation with his NFL club is finished. Each signing is broken down by team, said players previous NFL club, and year player signed a contract. Just because a player signed does not mean he ever played for that team. L. C. Greenwood, for instance, never played a down of football for Birmingham. No one shown with a date after 1975 ever actually played for the WFL team listed due to the league's insolvency as of that year.

Birmingham
Ross Brupbacher, LB (Chicago Bears) 1974
L. C. Greenwood, DE (Pittsburgh Steelers) 1975
Charley Harraway, RB (Washington Redskins) 1974
Ron Jessie, WR (Detroit Lions) 1975
George Mira, QB (Montreal Alouettes, CFL) 1974
Jim Mitchell, TE (Atlanta Falcons) 1975
Mike Montgomery, RB (Dallas Cowboys) 1975
Joe Profit, RB (New Orleans Saints) 1974
Jethro Pugh, DT (Dallas Cowboys) 1976
Paul Robinson, RB (Houston Oilers) 1975
Ken Stabler, QB (Oakland Raiders) 1976
Larry Willingham, DB (St. Louis Cardinals) 1974
Rayfield Wright, T (Dallas Cowboys) 1977

Chicago
Virgil Carter, QB (San Diego Chargers) 1974
Bob McKay, T (Cleveland Browns) 1975

Detroit
Warren McVea, RB (Kansas City Chiefs) 1974
Mike Taylor (born 1949), LB (New York Jets) 1974

Florida
Bill Bergey, LB (Cincinnati Bengals) 1976
Bob Davis, QB (New Orleans Saints) 1974
Fred Hoaglin, C (Baltimore Colts) 1975
Cecil Turner, WR (Chicago Bears) 1975
Perry Williams, RB (Green Bay Packers) 1975

Hawaiians
Vince Clements, RB (New York Giants) 1975
John Douglas, LB (New York Giants) 1975
Ron East, DT (San Diego Chargers) 1974
Ed Flanagan, C (Detroit Lions) 1975
John Gilliam, WR (Minnesota Vikings) 1975
Edd Hargett, QB (Houston Oilers) 1975
Calvin Hill, RB (Dallas Cowboys)
John Isenbarger, WR (San Francisco 49ers) 1975
Randy Johnson, QB (New York Giants) 1975
Ted Kwalick, TE (San Francisco 49ers) 1975
Jim Sniadecki, LB (San Francisco 49ers) 1975
John Wilbur, G (Washington Redskins) 1975
Greg Wojcik:, DT (San Diego Chargers) 1974

Houston
Bob Creech, LB (Philadelphia Eagles) 1974
Richmond Flowers, DB (New York Giants) 1975
Craig Morton, QB (Dallas Cowboys) 1975

Jacksonville
Guy Dennis, OG (Detroit Lions) 1975
Chip Glass, TE (Cleveland Browns) 1975
Fair Hooker, WR (Cleveland Browns) 1975
Ray Nettles, LB (British Columbia Lions, CFL) 1975
Bob Parrish, DE (New York Jets) 1975
Larry Smith, RB (Los Angeles Rams) 1975
Harmon Wages, RB (Atlanta Falcons) 1975

Memphis
Larry Csonka, RB (Miami Dolphins) 1975
John Harvey, RB (Montreal Alouettes, CFL) 1975
Jim Kiick, RB (Miami Dolphins) 1975
D. D. Lewis, LB (Dallas Cowboys) 1975
Paul Warfield, WR (Miami Dolphins) 1975
Ralph Hill (American football), C (New York Giants) 1975

New York
Al Barnes, WR (Detroit Lions) 1975
Carter Campbell, DE (New York Giants) 1975
Brian Dowling, QB (New England Patriots) 1976
John Elliott, DT (New York Jets) 1974
John Fuqua, RB (Pittsburgh Steelers) 1976
Gerry Philbin, DT (New York Jets) 1974

Philadelphia
Steve Chomyszak, DT (Cincinnati Bengals) 1975
Ron Holliday, WR (San Diego Chargers) 1975

Portland
Hise Austin, DB (Green Bay Packers) 1975
Ron Billingsley, DT (New Orleans Saints) 1975
Levert Carr, T (Houston Oilers) 1975
Tom Drougas, T (Baltimore Colts) 1976
Rocky Rasley, G (Detroit Lions) 1976
Mike Taylor (born 1945), T (St. Louis Cardinals) 1974
Steve Thompson, DT (New York Jets) 1975
Clancy Williams, DB (Washington Redskins) 1974

Southern California
Curley Culp, DT (Houston Oilers) 1975
Daryle Lamonica, QB (Oakland Raiders) 1975
Bob Newton, T (Chicago Bears) 1976
Dave Williams, WR (Pittsburgh Steelers) 1974
Dick Witcher, TE (San Francisco 49ers) 1975

Many other players jumped as well. Dallas running back Duane Thomas signed with the Hawaiians in 1975 after being released by the Washington Redskins. Longtime Cleveland Browns running back Leroy Kelly signed with Chicago. Other players joined the WFL despite being drafted by NFL squads, such as quarterback Danny White, who signed with Memphis before eventually joining the NFL's Dallas Cowboys.

== Television and radio coverage ==
The league's only national television contract was with the TVS Television Network, a syndicator of American sports programming. Merle Harmon and Alex Hawkins announced TVS' Thursday Night Game. Guest announcers were often brought into the booth including Paul Hornung, George Plimpton, Alex Karras, and McLean Stevenson.

According to TVS president Eddie Einhorn, the games actually got decent ratings at first. However, affiliates started bailing out after the Philadelphia and Jacksonville gate-inflation scandals. The trickle became a flood after two teams moved in the middle of the season and two more folded altogether. New York's midseason relocation came in part because the lights at Downing Stadium were nowhere near bright enough to illuminate the entire field, leading TVS to deem them inadequate for broadcast. This limited the Stars' national television exposure to away games. By the time of the World Bowl, the games were struggling to achieve Nielsen ratings above 2.0, and TVS found it nearly impossible to sell advertising. Despite the losses, Einhorn was actually willing to stick it out until Hemmeter announced the Winds were going to try to sign Namath. Einhorn told Hemmeter that the league had effectively bet its whole credibility on Namath coming to Chicago, and none of TVS' affiliates would commit to broadcasting the 1975 season unless Namath signed with the Winds. When he didn't, the WFL was left without a national television contract. The loss of such a critical revenue stream was a factor in the league's collapse midway through the season.

Recordings from a few WFL telecasts survive, including two games involving the Jacksonville Sharks: one includes approximately one hour of footage from the July 10, 1974 match between the Sharks and the New York Stars, and the second includes ten minutes of footage from the Sharks hosting the Chicago Fire on July 17. NFL Films included clips from the Sharks-Stars game, including an animated introduction, in their television documentary series Lost Treasures of NFL Films in 2001. In it, host Steve Sabol describes the damaged video tape as "a fourth generation copy of a copy" and as "TV history"; Sabol also noted that much of the WFL footage was lost or destroyed, and that much of what remained was home-recorded kinescopes far below broadcast quality. Lewis Bice, who shot promotional film for Birmingham to be used for highlight reels, preserved some of his work, which NFL Films used in the special along with the surviving telecast footage; NFL Films was pleasantly surprised at the caliber of Bice's surviving footage, which was remarkably close to NFL Films's own work, with Sabol commenting that if he'd known of Bice back then, "we would've hired him in a second." Twenty-one minutes of the TVS broadcast of the 1974 World Bowl - including the pre-game show, player introductions, and opening kick off - was uploaded to YouTube in 2018.

One complete game on radio in audio form also survives - the 1974 WFL Playoff Game involving the California Sun and the Hawaiians, recorded from Hawaiians flagship station KGMB. A mostly complete recording of the Chicago Fire's radio broadcast on WJJD-FM of their game against the Philadelphia Bell also survives as do fragments of other WFL radio broadcasts.

Local affiliates provided most of the television and radio coverage throughout the WFL existence. Notable local announcers include John Sterling (New York Stars/Charlotte Hornets television), Spencer Ross (New York Stars radio), Bob Sheppard (New York Stars PA), Mike Patrick (Jacksonville Sharks), Larry King (Shreveport Steamer), Larry Matson (Birmingham Americans/Birmingham Vulcans), Fred Sington (Birmingham Americans/Birmingham Vulcans) and Eddie Doucette and Vince Lloyd (Chicago Fire radio and TV respectively).

While the Boston Bulls franchise never made it onto the field; the team's preparations for the 1974 season had gone along far enough for the team to have signed contracts that January, shortly before the plug was pulled, with WLVI to televise the club's away games (as well as agreeing to pick-up the TVS package) and WEEI-AM to carry the team's entire schedule on radio. Although the franchise would be folded into the New York Stars, WLVI nevertheless honored their agreement to be the TVS/WFL outlet for Boston.

The league predated the vast expansion of cable television and sports networks spearheaded by the birth of ESPN in 1979, which severely limited the options the WFL had to televise. At the time, the AFL–NFL merger, coupled with the launch of Monday Night Football, had spread the NFL broadcast rights over all three of the Big Three television networks. The NFL, in a 1973 memo, noted that if the NFL had left one of the Big Three networks without NFL rights, it would have left an opening for the WFL. This memo was later used as evidence when the United States Football League (which included Einhorn as one of its team owners) filed an antitrust lawsuit against the NFL, hoping to break its television contracts; the lawsuit, although it acknowledged the monopoly, did not succeed in voiding the contracts.

== Teams ==
Same franchises are shown on the same line.

- Birmingham Americans (1974)
- Birmingham Vulcans (1975)
- Chicago Fire (1974)
- Chicago Winds (1975)
- Detroit Wheels (1974)
- Florida Blazers (1974), San Antonio Wings (1975)
- The Hawaiians (1974–1975)
- Houston Texans/Shreveport Steamer (1974), Shreveport Steamer (1975)
- Jacksonville Sharks (1974)
- Jacksonville Express (1975)
- Memphis Southmen (1974–1975)
- New York Stars/Charlotte Stars/Charlotte Hornets (1974), Charlotte Hornets (1975)
- Philadelphia Bell (1974–1975)
- Portland Storm (1974)
- Portland Thunder (1975)
- Southern California Sun (1974–1975)

== Stadiums ==
- Legion Field, Birmingham (1974–1975)
- Soldier Field, Chicago (1974–1975)
- Rynearson Stadium, Ypsilanti (1974)
- Citrus Bowl, Orlando (1974)
- Alamo Stadium, San Antonio (1975)
- Honolulu Stadium (1974–1975)
- Aloha Stadium, Honolulu (1975)
- Astrodome, Houston (1974)
- State Fair Stadium, Shreveport (1974–1975)
- Gator Bowl Stadium, Jacksonville (1974–1975)
- Liberty Bowl Stadium, Memphis (1974–1975)
- Downing Stadium, New York (1974)
- American Legion Memorial Stadium, Charlotte (1974–1975)
- John F. Kennedy Stadium, Philadelphia (1974–1975)
- Franklin Field, Philadelphia (1975)
- Civic Stadium, Portland (1974–1975)
- Anaheim Stadium, Anaheim (1974–1975)

== Rules ==
The WFL had several important rules differences from the National Football League of that era, and many were eventually adopted by the older league:

- The WFL football was orange colored, to make it more visible at night and to fit with 1970s aesthetics.
- Touchdowns were worth 7 points, instead of 6. As a result of this, the standard point after touchdown kick was eliminated.
- In lieu of the PAT kick, conversions called "Action Points" were instituted, and could only be scored via a scrimmage play (much in the same way as a two-point conversion) and were worth one point. The ball was placed on the two-and-a-half-yard line for an Action Point. This rule was a revival of a 1968 preseason experiment by the NFL and American Football League (called "Pressure Points"), but the WFL claimed this as an invention of their own, crediting Bill Finneran, a computer analyst from White Plains, New York, with the innovation. The original XFL employed a similar rule for its only season in 2001.
- Kickoffs were from the 30-yard line instead of the 40. Until 1973, NFL teams kicked off from the 40; from 1974 to 1993 and since 2011, the NFL moved its kickoffs to the 35; and from 1994 to 2010, the kickoff line was pushed back to the 30.
- Receivers needed only one foot in bounds for a legal pass reception, instead of both feet in the NFL then and now. College and high school football, the Arena Football League, and the CFL have always used the one-foot rule.
- Bump-and-run pass coverage was outlawed once a receiver was 3 yards beyond the line of scrimmage. The NFL adopted this rule in 1978, with a 5-yard bump zone.
- The goalposts were placed at the end line (the back of the end zone). At that time, college football goalposts were at the end line, but the NFL had its goalposts at the goal line from 1933 through 1973. In the 1974 season, the NFL also moved its posts back to the end line (where they have remained since) to curb the then-growing dominance of placekickers.
- Missed field goals were returned to the line of scrimmage or the 20-yard line, whichever was farther from the goal line. The NFL also adopted this rule for its 1974 season, then replaced the line of scrimmage with the point of the kick in 1994. Before this rule, missed field goals were (if unreturned) touchbacks, with the ball placed at the 20-yard line; this rule remains in high school football. U.S. college football later adopted this rule, but left the point as the line of scrimmage rather than the point of the placement.
- A player in motion was allowed to move toward the line of scrimmage before the snap, as long as he was behind the line of scrimmage at the snap. This rule had never been used at any level of outdoor American football, but was (and still is) part of Canadian football. This rule is used in the Arena Football League and was used in the XFL.
- Punt returners were prohibited from using the fair catch, although the covering team could not come within 5 yards of the kick returner until he caught the ball. This rule also came from Canadian football (which calls the breach of this 5-yard area a "no yards" penalty), which still uses it, as does Arena football with kickoffs and missed field goals. The XFL also used this rule, calling it the "halo rule".
- Penalties for offensive holding and ineligible receiver downfield were 10 yards, instead of 15. Several years later, these became 10-yard penalties at all levels of football; the NFL made this rule change in 1977. Still later, the ineligible receiver penalty was changed to 5 yards (with loss of down).
- The WFL's original overtime system was unique among American football leagues. Overtime in the regular season was one fixed 15-minute period, divided into two halves of 7½ minutes, each starting with a kickoff by one of the teams. The complete overtime was always played; there was no "sudden death" feature. In 1975, the WFL changed its overtime to the 15-minute sudden-death period.
- Limited (or no) pre-season games. In 1974 and 1975, NFL teams played six pre-season games and 14 regular-season games (which was changed in 1978 to four pre-season and 16 regular-season games, and again in 2021 to the current three pre-season and 17 regular-season games.). The CFL played 16-game seasons with four pre-season games (since 1986, they play an 18-game season with two pre-season games). In contrast, the WFL's 1974 schedule called for 20 regular-season games and no pre-season games; in 1975, it was 18 regular-season games and two pre-season games.
- Summertime football. The NFL's regular season started on September 15 in 1974 and on September 21 in 1975; the WFL's regular season started on July 10 in 1974 and on July 26 in 1975 (with the 1975 pre-season starting on July 5). At the time, the Canadian Football League, which must contend with colder winters than American leagues, had recently completed a gradual move from playing twice weekly with a similar start time to the season as the NFL to playing once weekly and starting its season in July (the CFL now commonly starts its regular season in June).
- Weeknight football (1974). While NFL games were played mostly on Sundays and, from 1970 onwards, a game on Monday night, the WFL's 1974 schedule called for Wednesday night football (with a Thursday night national TV game). This scheduling format was abandoned in 1975. The featured Thursday night game was later adopted as Thursday Night Football by the NFL in 2006.
- The Dicker-rod (named for its inventor, George Dicker). For measuring first-down yardage, instead of using a 10-yard chain strung between two sticks and a chain crew to perform the task, the WFL used a device operated by a single person. This was a single stick, approximately three yards long, used to gauge the position of the football relative to the nearest gridiron line (the lines completely crossing the playing area, spaced every five yards).

== Commissioners ==
- Gary L. Davidson 1973–1974
- Christopher Hemmeter 1974–1975

== See also ==
- List of American and Canadian football leagues
