= Lanier School =

Lanier School may refer to:

- Lanier Middle School (disambiguation)
- Lanier High School (disambiguation)
