= Ricky Powers =

American football player and coach (born 1970)

No. 22, 44
- Position: Running back

Personal information
- Born: November 30, 1970 (age 55); Akron, Ohio, U.S.
- Listed height: 6 ft 0 in (1.83 m)
- Listed weight: 205 lb (93 kg)

Career information
- High school: Buchtel (Akron, Ohio)
- College: Michigan
- NFL draft: 1994: undrafted

Career history
- Detroit Lions (1994)*; Cleveland Browns (1994–1995); Baltimore Ravens (1996)*; Ohio Cannon (1999); San Antonio Matadors (2000)
- * Offseason or practice squad member only

Awards and highlights
- First-team All-Big Ten (1991)
- Stats at Pro Football Reference

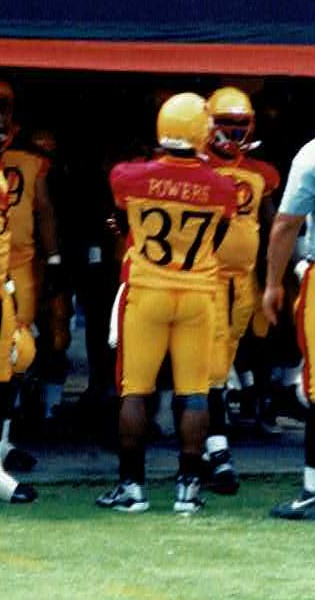
Ricky Powers pregame with the San Antonio Matadors.

Richard Powers (born November 30, 1970) is a former running back in the National Football League (NFL) for the Cleveland Browns and a former University of Michigan Wolverines football co-captain. In the NFL, he had a brief career with the Browns during their final season before they relocated to become the Baltimore Ravens. His career ended due to being lost in the shuffle when the Browns moved to Baltimore and changed coaching staffs. In college, he set the Michigan football freshman rushing record that stood for fourteen seasons, and as a sophomore was the leading rusher for the team during Desmond Howard's Heisman Trophy-winning season. With the Wolverines, he was a member of three consecutive Big Ten Conference football championship teams. In high school, he was the Parade All-American star running back of the two-time Ohio High School Athletic Association (OHSAA) football championship team at Buchtel High School, where he has returned to coach baseball and football.

== High school ==
Powers was both born and raised in Akron, where he led the Buchtel High School football team to back-to-back OHSAA championships, as well as being named a high school All-American. Powers graduated from Buchtel in 1990 after leading them to the 1987 and 1988 Ohio Division II state high school championships. As a sophomore in 1987, Powers rushed for 1,600 yards including 600 in four playoff games and helped his coach earn Summit County Coach of the Year honors. Powers rushed for 1,741 yards and 28 touchdowns as a junior, including 289 yards against Nordonia High School in a playoff game, and 2,014 yards and 19 touchdowns as a senior. During that junior season, he became the third junior (following Chris Spielman and Jeff Logan, by one account and Spielman and Charles Gladman by another) to earn Akron Beacon Journal Player of the Year honors. During the season, he topped his sophomore Championship game 161 yard effort with a Championship game record 206 rushing yard effort. He earned All-Ohio Division II honors. Ohio rival, Robert Smith, earned USA Today Player of the Year honors and Powers earned an honorable mention during their junior years. Powers entered his senior season on numerous lists including the Chicago Sun-Times national top 100 and 24-man All-Midwest lists, The Times-Picayune Top 25 national prospects, and USA Today top 13 Ohio players. His senior season ended with a "Turkey Day" City Championship game. He and Smith, who chose to go to rival Ohio State, were the two top football prospects in Ohio and the nation in 1989. Smith was named Mr. Football (Ohio), but Powers was named the top player in the nation by the Dallas Morning News. In a poll of 14 experts produced by the Detroit Free Press, Powers was the all-Midwest (Big Ten States of Illinois, Indiana, Iowa, Michigan, Minnesota, Ohio and Wisconsin because Penn State had not yet joined the conference) Offensive player of the year in a first-team backfield with Jerome Bettis and Chris Weinke. Powers became the first two-time Akron Beacon Journal Player of the Year. He was a Parade All-American and earned first-team All-USA honors from USA Today. Many publications across the country listed Powers among the best five or ten players in the nation. Powers was recruited by both the Michigan Wolverines and the Ohio State Buckeyes.

== College ==
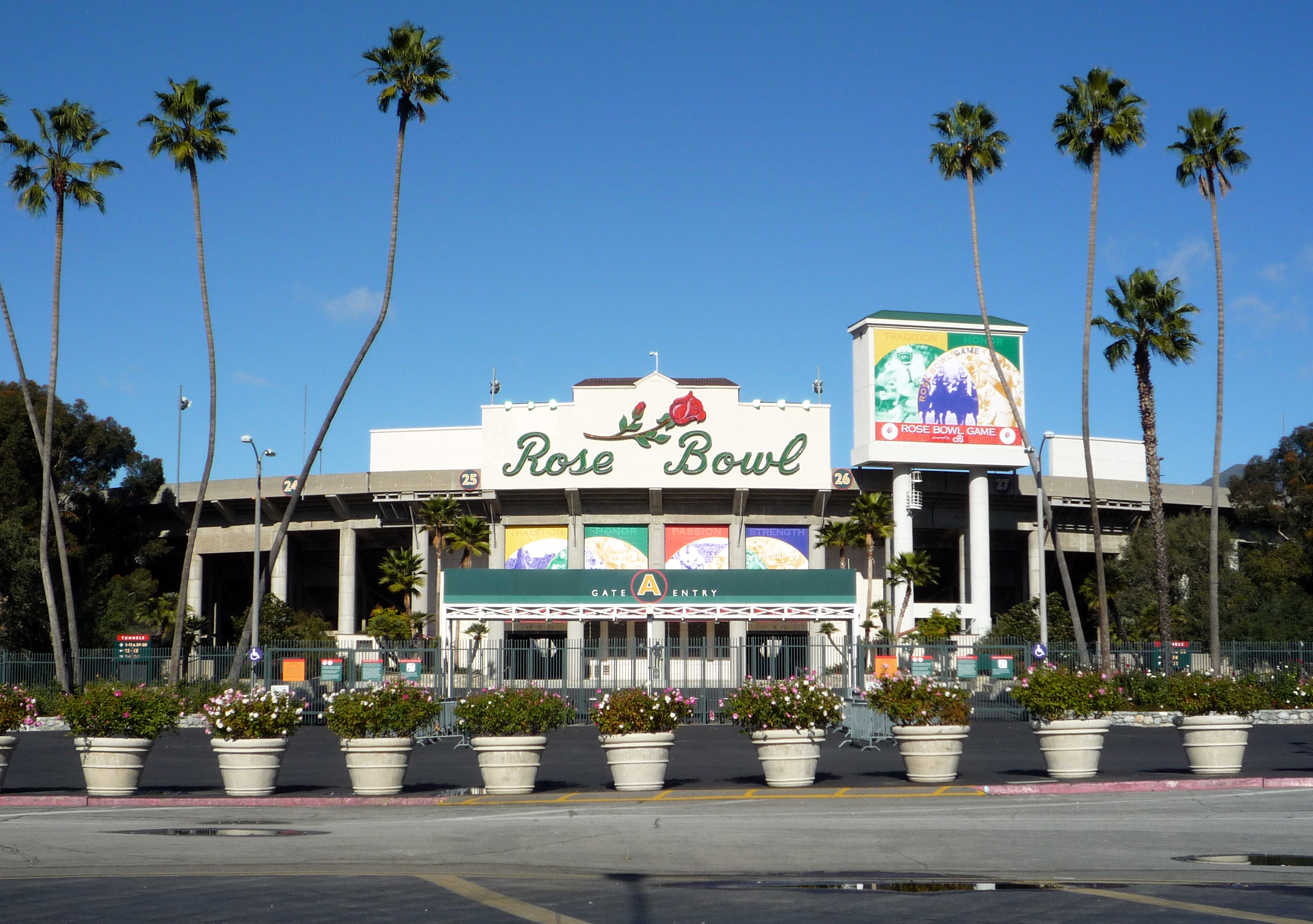
Powers and both the 1991 and 1992 Big Ten Champions appeared in the Rose Bowl.

Powers, who wore #12 for the Michigan Wolverines football program from 1990 to 1993, shared the tailback position with Jon Vaughn as a freshman and Tyrone Wheatley as a junior and senior. Although he was only the official starter for one game as a freshman in 1990, he set the Michigan freshman rushing record with 789 rushing yards, a record broken by Mike Hart in 2004. That season, he led the Wolverines, who three-peated as Big Ten Conference Champions, to victories in their last four games with 100-yard rushing efforts in each game, and tied Vaughn with five 100-yard rushing efforts. The next year, as a sophomore, he started eleven of twelve games and was named to the All-Big Ten Conference team. Although as a sophomore in 1991 he led the team in rushing with 1251 yards, he shared the spotlight with Heisman Trophy winner Desmond Howard. That 1991 team would again win the Big Ten Conference Championship, and it would produce eighteen National Football League draftees between 1992 and 1995. In 1992 and 1993, his offensive totals were lower than in 1991 because he was sharing playing time with Tyrone Wheatley. However, in 1993, he was named Michigan Football Co-Captain of a five-time Big Ten Conference team. Powers currently ranks 13th on the all-time Michigan rushing yards list with 2680 career yards. Powers obtained his bachelor's degree in kinesiology. Both the 1991 and 1992 Conference Champions went to the Rose Bowl.

== Professional career ==
In the NFL, Powers, who measured 6 feet (1.83 m) and 213 pounds (96.6 kg), was signed as a free agent in 1994 by the Detroit Lions, but he was waived before the season started. He later that year signed with the Cleveland Browns, joining their practice squad. He remained on the practice squad until being promoted to the regular roster for the final three games of the 1995 National Football League season. He totaled 51 yards on 14 rushes, one six-yard pass reception, and three kickoff returns for a total of 54 yards. When the Browns relocated following the 1995 season to become the Baltimore Ravens, and Ted Marchibroda replaced Bill Belichick as coach, Powers got lost in the shuffle. He dabbled with World League of American Football, the Ohio Cannon of the short-lived Regional Football League in 1999, and the San Antonio Matadors of the Spring Football League afterwards, but soon retired.

In 2007, Powers assumed the football coaching duties at his high school alma mater, Akron Buchtel High School, where he has been the head baseball coach since 2004. At Buchtel, he inherits a football team that has a tradition of producing major college scholarship athletes and a few professional ones. Recent Buchtel Griffins who have become professional athletes include Antonio Pittman, Charlton Keith, and Ramon Walker. For 2007 and 2008, Buchtel competes in Ohio High School Athletic Association Division II, which is for schools with enrollments of between 365 and 523. Buchtel has qualified for the state tournament 9 times in the past as both a Division II and Division III entrant, but they were not among the 32 teams in the 120 team Division II class to qualify in 2007.

== Personal life ==
Powers' older brother, Scott, had been an All-District cornerback who recorded nine interceptions, six fumbles recoveries and four blocked field goals and three blocked extra points during his 1987 senior season. Ricky Powers' final decision came down to Michigan State and Michigan according to his mother. At the time, Scott was a Sophomore starting cornerback for the Cincinnati Bearcats and was trying to transfer to Michigan State. Due to a suspicion of tampering, Scott would only be allowed to transfer if Ricky chose Michigan. Powers' mother, Rosetta, claimed Ricky had been leaning toward Michigan State prior to the determination regarding his brother.

== See also ==
- Lists of Michigan Wolverines football rushing leaders
