= Keith Rucker =

American football player (born 1968)

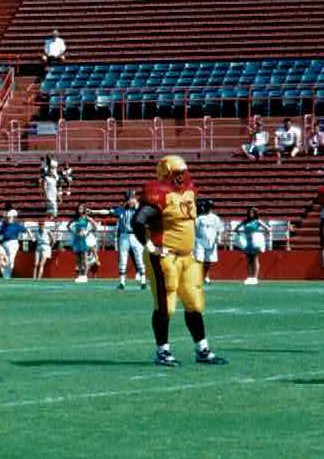
- Rucker with the San Antonio Matadors in 2000

Rio Grande RedStorm
- Title: Defensive coordinator

Personal information
- Born: November 20, 1968 (age 57); University Park, Illinois, U.S.

Career information
- Position: Defensive tackle (No. 79, 95, 99)
- High school: Shaker Heights (OH)
- College: Ohio Wesleyan
- NFL draft: 1992: undrafted

Career history

Playing
- Phoenix Cardinals (1992–1993); Cincinnati Bengals (1994–1995); Philadelphia Eagles (1996); Washington Redskins (1997); Kansas City Chiefs (1997); San Antonio Matadors (2000)

Coaching
- Ohio Wesleyan (2000) Defensive line coach; Mount Healthy HS (OH) (2001–2003) Head coach; Walnut Hills HS (OH) (2004–2006) Assistant coach; Loveland HS (OH) (2007–2009) Assistant coach; Aiken HS (OH) (2010) Assistant coach; Princeton HS (OH) (2011) Defensive line coach & special teams coordinator; Ohio Wesleyan (2012–2016) Defensive line coach & special teams coordinator; New York Jets (2014) Intern defensive line coach; Cincinnati Bengals (2015) Intern defensive line coach; Summit Country Day (OH) (2016) Special teams coordinator & defensive coordinator; La Salle HS (OH) (2017) Defensive coordinator; Capital (2018–2020) Assistant coach; Denison (2021–2022) Defensive coordinator; Bishop Fenwick HS (OH) (2023–2025) Linebackers coach; Rio Grande (2026–present) Defensive coordinator
- Stats at Pro Football Reference

Keith Rucker V (born November 20, 1968) is an American football coach and former professional player who was a defensive tackle in the National Football League (NFL). He is the defensive coordinator for the University of Rio Grande, a position he has held since 2026. He played for the Phoenix Cardinals (1992–1993), the Cincinnati Bengals (1994–1995), Philadelphia Eagles (1996), the Washington Redskins (1996–1997), and the Kansas City Chiefs (1997). He finished his playing career with the San Antonio Matadors of the Spring Football League. He played college football for the Eastern Michigan Eagles and Ohio Wesleyan Battling Bishops.

Rucker is currently an assistant coach at Bishop Fenwick High School in Middletown, Ohio.
