= Joseph Bernal =

American politician (1927–2025)

- Born: March 1, 1927; San Antonio, Texas, U.S.
- Died: January 25, 2025 (aged 97)
- Education: Trinity University, Our Lady of the Lake University, University of Texas at Austin
- Occupation: Politician
- Years active: 1947–1973
- Term: Texas House of Representatives 1964–1966 Texas Senate 1966–1972
- Political party: Democrat
- Board member of: Board of Education, Mexican-American Caucus Executive Director

Joseph Bernal (March 1, 1927 – January 25, 2025) was an American politician. He was a significant figure in the Chicano community. Bernal spent eight years in the Texas Legislature. Bernal was in both the Texas House of Representatives and the Texas Senate. Bernal was in the Texas House of Representatives from 1964 to 1966, he was in the Texas Senate from 1966 to 1972. When Bernal got his start in politics 80% of Chicanos were not graduating high school. Now only 30% are not graduating which he said is still a high percentage. During his time in politics, Bernal produced many opportunities for schooling and opportunities for the Chicano community as a whole. The impact that Bernal had on his community got San Antonio school district superintendent Oscar Miller to meet with community sponsors such as Senator Bernal and others to address Chicano/a student's demands for improved school facilities.

== Early life ==
Joseph Bernal was born in San Antonio, Texas, on March 1, 1927. Bernal said that his family grew up poor, he did not think that they were poor because they did not act like they were. In a statement from Bernal, he said that his family "was very rich in spirit" and his mom raised nine kids by herself. Bernal's father had died when he was young. Bernal enjoyed watching movies at the Progreso, often standing near the entrance during "dos por uno" promotions. He enjoyed popular Hollywood movies on weekends. His family frequented the Progreso Drug Store and the Mexican restaurant next door. Bernal was a student council representative at Lanier High School. This was his first step towards politics. Bernal also played basketball at Lanier High School where his team made the state finals but lost by one point. Bernal said that the students in his high school were given ribbons that read "I am American, I speak English" and had them taken away by the student council when someone was caught speaking Spanish. However, Bernal encouraged people to be bilingual.

== Military and college experience ==
After high school in 1944, Bernal joined the army. In the army, Bernal was never in combat but he worked a desk job in the Philippine islands of Leyte, Mindoro, Luzon, and as well as in Tokyo, Japan. While working his desk job on deployment he would constantly look at his picture from September 1, 1945, when he was nine days from being deployed and he thought that before he deployed people just looked at him as a Mexican but in the service, he was looked at as an American. When he returned, he found that things had reverted to the way they were before his military service, with instances where he could not get a haircut or buy a house due to his Mexican heritage. After Bernal returned he attended Trinity University on the G.I. Bill. He also got his master's degree from Our Lady of the Lake University and a doctorate degree from the University of Texas at Austin. Bernal taught at David Crockett Elementary School for ten years, while he did that on the weekends and in his free time he worked with Guadalupe Church and had a long association with Inman Christian Center.

== Background on the Chicano Movement ==
The Chicano Movement's purpose was to fight for the civil rights and cultural identities of the Chicano and Mexican-American Communities. The movement was most active in the 1960s and 1970s but still continues today. Today Chicanos and Latinos make up the largest minority in the United States being about 20% of the population. The term Chicano became popular around the 1940s. The term Chicano was used by second-generation Mexican-Americans like Zoot-suiters and Pachucos who felt they were outcasts in both the Anglo-American culture and the Mexican culture of their parents. The Chicano Movement helped advance Latino political power. The Chicano Movement was in response to the poverty, discrimination, and lack of opportunity that faced Mexican-American communities. The movement got motivation from the farmworker movement led by Cesar Chavez and Dolores Huerta. The movement fought against segregated public schools in East Los Angeles, leading to the "Blowouts" in 1968, resulting in thousands of Chicano students protesting.

== Political career ==
Joseph "Joe" Bernal never thought of being a politician but when brought the idea he saw how underrepresented Chicanos were during that time. His Austin political career was between 1964 and 1972 then he was a part of the Mexican-American Caucus after this. Between 1900 and 1953, Texas had only two Hispanics in the legislature. By 1987, 25 Mexican Americans held legislative offices, largely due to the Southwest Voter Registration Education Project and redistricting. Bernal had a lot to do with bills that helped Mexican-Americans and others. Bernal joined the Texas House of Representatives in 1964. In Joseph's first term, he passed three bills including a bill on segregation. This is also where he passed a bill that allowed people who were in Texas for more than 25 years to receive benefits regardless of citizenship status. Bernal acted as the executive director of the Mexican-American Caucus. During his time in this group, he accomplished many things to further Mexican Americans' rights and their community. Bernal also had a role in getting better education rights for Latino children. In 1967, Dan Salcedo and Joe Bernal, sponsors of the Inman Christian Center, organized a field trip to Center Point, Texas. The group provided information on political issues, organizing strategies, and leadership training to male Lanier students. Senator Bernal mentored female students on American democracy and parliamentary decision-making according to Robert's Rules of Order. Bernal introduced legislation abolishing English-only language laws, established a San Antonio campus for the University of Texas, and supported a new Dental and Nursing Program at the University of Texas San Antonio campus.

== Background on Tejano politics ==
Tejano politics have been around for more than a century before the formation of the state of Texas in 1845. The oldest tradition of government by Tejanos was ayuntamiento which is traceable all the way back to the Roman time. Ayuntamiento is a form of government that is run by a mayor and a council. The main focus was both civil and criminal matters. This area's first ayuntamiento was not formed until 1731. The economic, social, and political structures of the ayuntamiento form of government were supported by many of the residents like the ranchos and Spanish Missions. On September 16, 1810, in Dolores, Guanajuato Miguel Hidalgo y Costilla made a cry for Mexico's independence from Spain. When this news was received by the Tejanos many people disagreed because they considered it disloyal. After many royalist officials were executed near Bexar, because of this event the central government of Mexico sent Commandant General Joaquín de Arredondo to take Texas back. In 1813 he succeeded in doing this. Many wealthy Tejano families fled Texas. The Texas Revolution was mainly led by Anglos but many Tejanos participated but were now the minority. "Among the fifty-six men who signed the Texas Declaration of Independence on March 2, 1836, three were Hispanic". Many things went into a lack of Tejano political representation for example minority status, disregard of rights, language differences, etc. Tejano's political participation dropped under American rule. "Between 1846 and 1961 only nineteen Hispanic politicians won election or were named to represent their districts in the state legislature". Between the 1940s and 1960s, significant national conferences and organizations were established to improve relations between Anglos and Mexican Americans. To help improve relations the US government initiated diplomatic solutions. This included the Office of the Coordinator of Inter-American Affairs and organized two national conferences.

== Tejano Politics ==
Joseph "Joe" Bernal played a major role in Tejano politics, especially in bilingual education. The bills that ended in De jure segregation were brought forward in the Texas Senate by Bernal in May 1969. During the early twentieth century, there were many organizations that were found in all of the areas where most of the Tejanos lived. These organizations fought for Mexican-American rights and fought the issues of lynching, labor, and educational discrimination. Representatives of these groups met in Harlingen Texas to form the LLAC (League of Latin American Citizens) in August 1927. This group did not succeed in its mission, but just two years later in February 1929, the LULAC (League of United Latin American Citizens) was formed and became the leading national civil rights organization.

== Mexican-American Legislative Caucus ==
The Mexican-American Caucus was made up of Mexican-American members of the Texas House of Representatives including Joseph "Joe" Bernal. The Mexican American Legislative Caucus first originated in 1972 but did not become a caucus until 1975. In 1981 the Mexican American Legislative Caucus became an official organization with a budget and staff from the Texas House of Representatives. The objective of this group was to promote and fight for legislation that benefits Mexican Americans. In 1975 Bernal was the first executive director of the Mexican American Legislative Caucus. In 1983, the first Republican, Gerald Gesitweidt, joined MALC. In 1991–92, it had 26 members, representing a fifth of the House vote. In 2001, it had 41 members. This organization that Bernal was a part of helped the Mexican-American community in many ways. Some examples of the ways the Mexican-American Caucus helped would be in 1983–84 they passed a Bilingual Education Act, and in 1985–86 they passed an unemployment-compensation law that also included farmworkers. Another thing that the MALC did was pass a minimum wage bill for farmworkers in 1987–88. This group affected the redistricting process in the years 1991 and in 2001.

== Career following politics ==
After his career in politics, Joseph "Joe" Bernal became an assistant superintendent for the Harlandale School District. Then in 1996, he was elected to the Board of education. Bernal also won his reelection in the year 2000. Bernal assisted in selecting textbooks and supporting programs that benefited Latino youth during his time as an assistant superintendent and as a member of the Board of education. Bernal is a well-known figure in the Mexican-American community which he still participated in.

Bernal died on January 25, 2025, at the age of 97.
