= Alamo Stadium =

Stadium in San Antionio, Texas

- The Rock Pile
- Interactive map of Alamo Stadium
- Location: 110 Tuleta Dr; San Antonio 78212
- Owner: San Antonio Independent School District
- Operator: San Antonio Independent School District
- Capacity: 18,500 (since renovation works in 2011)
- Surface: NexTurf
- Record attendance: 26,208 November 11, 1949 Jefferson High vs Fox Technical High

Construction
- Opened: September 20, 1940; 85 years ago
- Cost: $500,000
- Architects: Phelps & Dewees & Simmons, A.I.A.
- Structural engineer: W.E. Simpson Co.

Tenants
- St. Mary's Rattlers (NCAA) (1940–1941); 1947 Alamo Bowl (NCAA); San Antonio Wings (WFL) (1975); San Antonio Thunder (NASL) (1976); San Antonio Gunslingers (USFL) (1984–1985); San Antonio Riders (WLAF) (1991); San Antonio Matadors (SFL) (2000); Corinthians FC SA (NPSL) (2015–2016); San Antonio ISD (UIL) (1940–present)
- Alamo Stadium and Gymnasium
- U.S. National Register of Historic Places
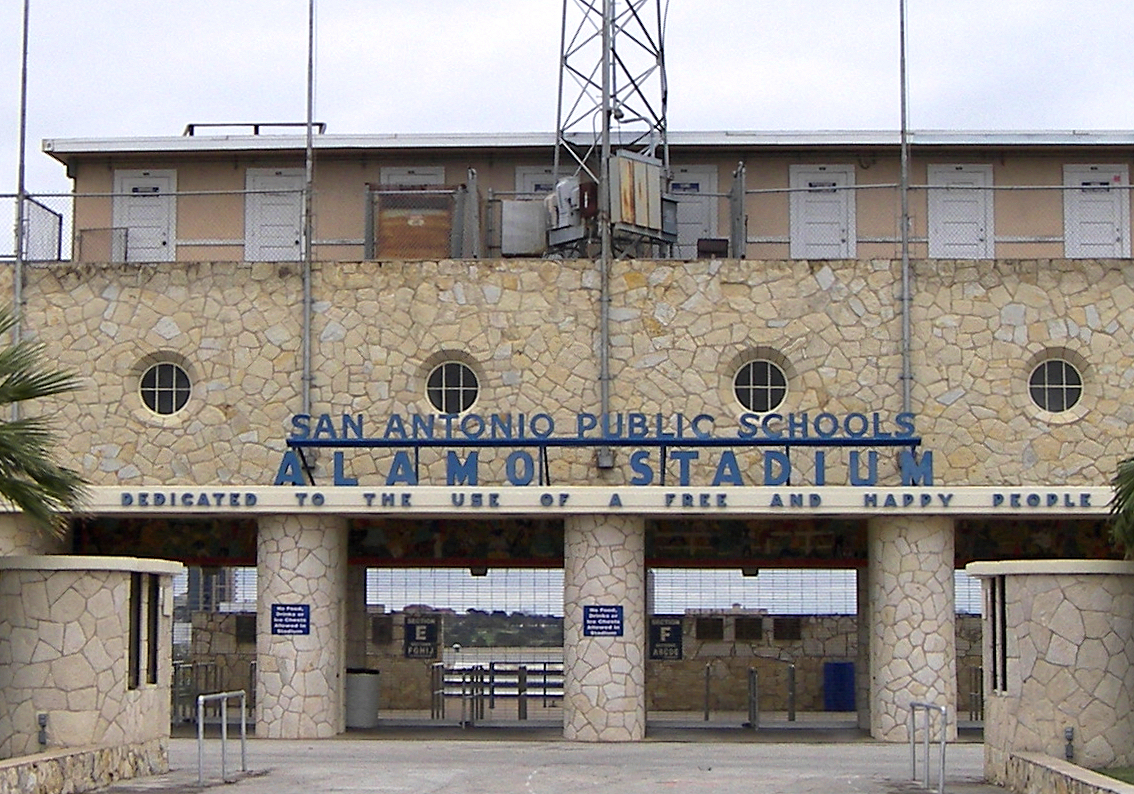

- Location within Texas
- Coordinates: 29°27′45.95″N 98°28′44.51″W
- Built: 1940
- NRHP reference No.: 11000651
- Added to NRHP: September 8, 2011

Alamo Stadium is a horseshoe-shaped football and soccer stadium in the Monte Vista Historic District of San Antonio, Texas. Nicknamed "The Rock Pile" due to its primarily limestone construction it was completed in September 1940 as a Works Progress Administration (WPA) project.

The stadium is currently owned and operated by the San Antonio Independent School District as a high school football and soccer facility. It has a seating capacity of 18,500, making it the 3rd largest high school stadium in the state of Texas.

Soccer club Corinthians FC of San Antonio were tenants.

== History ==
=== Early years ===
Initially proposed by SAISD trustees in May 1939, the stadium was constructed on the site of an abandoned rock quarry at a total cost of just under $500,000. The majority of funding was provided by the federal Works Progress Administration (project 65-1-66-30), with approximately $110,000 coming from district revenue bonds.

24,000 people were in attendance for the stadium's opening celebration, a high school football doubleheader on September 20, 1940. Corpus Christi defeated Jefferson in the first game 14-0. Brackenridge defeated (Houston) Reagan 19-2 in the second.

=== Modern day ===
The stadium is currently used by the high schools of the SAISD, including Brackenridge, Burbank, Edison, Fox Tech, Highlands, Sam Houston, Jefferson, and Lanier High Schools for mainly high school football games. It is also home to track meets hosted by SAISD, also home to the Region IV-5A track meets which occur in late April or early May. The Battle of the Bands is held there annually during Fiesta.

The site was added to the National Register of Historic Places on September 8, 2011.

=== Future ===
In November 2010, San Antonio voters approved a $515 million bond which included $35 million for renovation of the stadium. Proposed updates include new bathrooms, plumbing, seating and repairs. Visitors in 2017 noticed improvements but questioned whether the noticeable improvements tallied $35M in value. A lack of adequate parking (particularly noticeable on the East side of the stadium) has been a recurring complaint, with no real options to expand given the surrounding area.

In January 2011, San Antonio Spurs owner SS&E expressed an interest in bringing a professional soccer team to San Antonio, possibly playing in Alamo Stadium.

== Stadium usage ==
=== High school football ===
The stadium has been home to numerous high school games, including the Chili Bowl, an annual football game between Fox Tech and Lanier high schools. It regularly sold out, and was consistently one of the highest attended regular season football games in Texas, averaging about 23,000 spectators. After the 2009 season, the Fox Tech football team was disbanded, ending the series.

In 2002, the stadium hosted the U.S. Army All-American Bowl.

=== College football ===
Alamo Stadium has also hosted college football games. When the stadium opened in 1940, two college football games were held at the newly constructed stadium, Texas A&M's defeat of Tulsa, 41–6, on October 5, and Baylor's defeat of Villanova, 7–0, two weeks later, on October 19. The stadium was host to the Texas A&M–Texas Tech football rivalry for eight consecutive games from 1943 through 1950. It was also the home of the first bowl game held in San Antonio, the 1947 Alamo Bowl between Hardin–Simmons and Denver. The game was a financial failure and a postseason bowl game would not return to San Antonio until the modern incarnation of the Alamo Bowl that began in 1993 and has since been held at the Alamodome.

=== St. Mary's Rattlers ===
For the 1940 and 1941 college football seasons, the St. Mary's Rattlers played their home games at Alamo Stadium. Their first game, and the first college football game, at the stadium was a 51-0 win against Daniel Baker College on September 26, 1940. The Rattlers final college football game was a 7-0 loss to Mississippi Southern.

=== Professional football ===
The stadium has been home to several professional football teams, including the San Antonio Wings of the WFL in 1975, the San Antonio Gunslingers of the USFL from 1984 to 1985, the San Antonio Riders of the WLAF in 1991, and the San Antonio Matadors of the Spring Football League in 2000.

=== Soccer ===
Alamo Stadium was the home of the San Antonio Thunder for 1976, their second of only two years in the city. The team was a member of the North American Soccer League and moved to Hawaii for the 1977 season.
