= Edgar Allan Poe Middle School =

Edgar Allan Poe Middle School can refer to following schools in the United States:

- Edgar Allan Poe Middle School, Fairfax County, Virginia
- Edgar Allan Poe Middle School, San Antonio Independent School District, San Antonio, Texas
