= Brian Wiggins =

American gridiron football player (born 1968)

Profile
- Position: Wide receiver

Personal information
- Born: June 14, 1968 (age 58); New Rochelle, NY

Career information
- College: Texas Southern University

Career history
- 1991: New England Patriots*
- 1992: New Orleans Night
- 1993–1994: Calgary Stampeders
- 1995-1998: Carolina Panthers
- 1998: Edmonton Eskimos

Awards and highlights
- Jackie Parker Trophy (1993)

Brian Wiggins is a former award-winning wide receiver in the Canadian Football League.

Wiggins played his college football at Texas Southern University. Not drafted and a free agent, he signed with the New England Patriots in 1991 but was released before the regular season. He played for the New Orleans Night of the Arena Football League in 1992 where he caught 72 passes for 805 yards.

He joined the CFL's Calgary Stampeders in 1993, and his 47 catches for 881 yards won the Jackie Parker Trophy for best rookie in the Western Conference. In 1994, he had 64 catches for 859 yards and became a free agent after the season, leaving the CFL. During 1995 and 1996 he was on the Carolina Panthers practice squad. In 1998, he returned with Edmonton and caught 31 passes for 443 yards. His 16 receptions in one game, at Saskatchewan, October 23, 1993, is still a CFL record.

In 2000, he was named head coach for the San Antonio Matadors of the Spring Football League. Presently he is the President and Coach of the Houston Energy, a team in the Women's Football Alliance.
