= Sam Houston High School (San Antonio, Texas) =

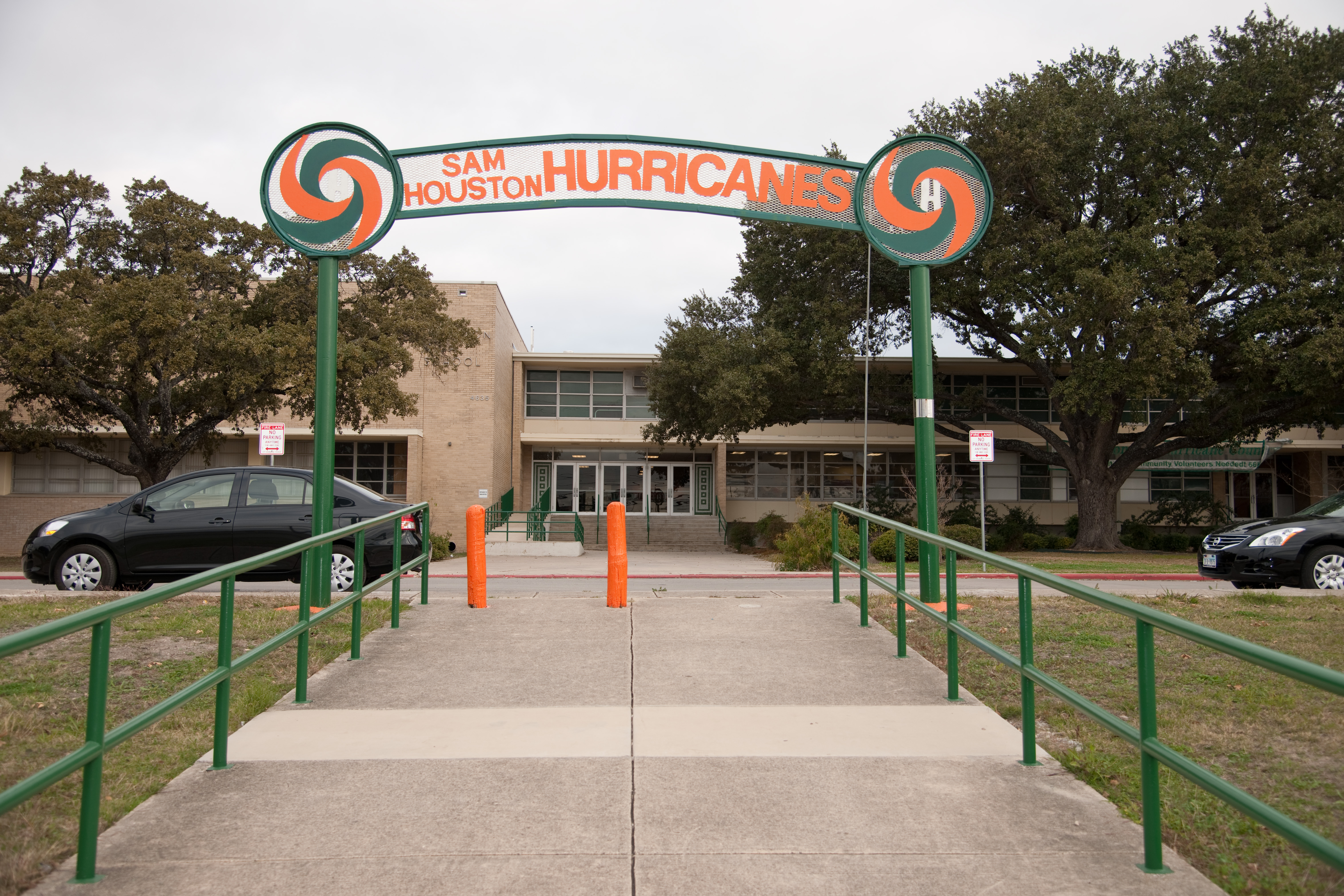

Location
- 4635 East Houston Street; San Antonio, Texas 78220; United States; 29.425233°N 98.399182°W

Information
- Type: Public high school
- School district: San Antonio Independent School District
- NCES School ID: 483873004363
- Faculty: 67.58 (on an FTE basis)
- Grades: 9–12
- Enrollment: 856 (2022–2023)
- Student to teacher ratio: 12.67
- Colors: Orange, green, and white
- Team name: Hurricanes
- Website: www.saisd.net/o/samhouston

Sam Houston High School, also known as Houston High School, is a public high school located in eastern San Antonio, Texas, United States, and classified as a 4A school by the UIL. This school is one of twelve high schools in the San Antonio Independent School District. For the 2024–2025 school year, the school was given a "C" by the Texas Education Agency.

== Athletics ==
The Sam Houston Hurricanes compete in the following sports:

- Baseball
- Basketball
- Cross Country
- Football
- Golf
- Soccer
- Softball
- Swimming and Ding
- Tennis
- Track and Field
- Volleyball

== Shooting ==
On September 11, 1990, three high school students were shot and wounded in what was believed to be a gang-related confrontation on the school grounds. Three other students were arrested shortly afterwards. Witnesses told police a group of students had gathered on the patio when shots were fired into the group. 17-year-old John Campbell was wounded in the right foot, 18-year-old Larry Johnson was wounded in the right thigh and calf, and a 16-year-old boy received a chest wound. The wounded students were all listed in stable conditions at various San Antonio hospitals. Police said they recovered a large-caliber pistol from the crime scene. Eighteen-year-old Kenneth Wolford, plus two other male students, were arrested and charged for the shooting. No serious incidents of violence at the school had occurred previously, although a cache of weapons had been found inside a school locker the week prior to the shooting and security was increased at the school as a result.
