= Luther Burbank High School (Texas) =

Location
- 1002 Edwards Street; San Antonio, Bexar County, Texas 78204; United States; 29.392887°N 98.509254°W

Information
- School type: Public, high school
- Locale: City: Large
- School district: San Antonio ISD
- NCES School ID: 483873004330
- Principal: Irene Talamontes
- Faculty: 91.11 (on an FTE basis)
- Grades: 9–12
- Enrollment: 1,319 (2022–2023)
- Student to teacher ratio: 14.48
- Colors: Orange, black, and white
- Team name: Bulldogs
- Website: Official Website

Luther Burbank High School is a high school in San Antonio, Texas in the San Antonio Independent School District. During 2022–2023, Burbank High School had an enrollment of 1,319 students and a student to teacher ratio of 14.48. The school received an overall rating of "C" from the Texas Education Agency for the 2024–2025 school year.

== History ==
When Burbank opened in September 1937, it was initially called the Steve's Gardens Jr.-Sr. High School, soon renamed for Luther Burbank, an American botanist, horticulturist, and agricultural science pioneer. Burbank was the only school in San Antonio to offer an agriculture program. The program boasted a 75-acre student farm, the largest on-campus farm in Texas. Unlike Ag programs that Focus on livestock, Burbank students were also able to grow row crops such as corn, sorghum, sunflowers, and many others.

By the turn of the 21st Century, large portions of the farm were turned over to create Sports Facilities for SAISD. After Hurricane Katrina, the New Orleans Saints practiced at the Burbank sports complex from 2005 to 2006.

== Athletics ==
The Burbank Bulldogs compete in the following sports:

- Baseball
- Basketball
- Cross Country
- Football
- Golf
- Soccer
- Softball
- Swimming and Diving
- Tennis
- Track and Field
- Volleyball
- Water Polo

== Notable alumni ==
- Joe Horlen (born 1937), Major League Baseball All Star pitcher
- Gary Bell (born 1936), Major League Baseball All Star pitcher
- Vincent Valdez (born 1977), artist
- Julian S. Garcia (born 1950), Writer, Editor, ViAztlan International Journal. Frequent Op-Ed writer for San Antonio Express-News. His San Antonio Express-News op-ed article, "Time for new generation of Burbank memories," was cited in Our Lady of the Lake University alumni news.
