= Lanier High School =

Lanier High School is the name of several high schools in the United States. Some include:

- Juan Navarro High School, formerly Lanier High School, in Austin, Texas
- Sidney Lanier High School in Montgomery, Alabama
- Lanier High School (San Antonio, Texas)
- Lanier High School (Jackson, Mississippi)
- Lanier High School (Sugar Hill, Georgia)
- Lanier High School in Macon, Georgia, now part of Central High School (Macon, Georgia)
