= Ronald Humphrey (American football) =

American football player (born 1969)

No. 25
- Position: Running back

Personal information
- Born: March 3, 1969 (age 57); Marland, Texas, U.S.
- Listed height: 5 ft 10 in (1.78 m)
- Listed weight: 211 lb (96 kg)

Career information
- High school: Forest Brook (Houston, Texas)
- College: Mississippi Valley State
- NFL draft: 1992: 8th round, 212th overall pick

Career history
- Indianapolis Colts (1992–1995); San Antonio Matadors (2000)

Career NFL statistics
- Rushing yards: 91
- Rushing average: 4.6
- Receptions: 5
- Receiving yards: 30
- Total touchdowns: 1
- Stats at Pro Football Reference

Ronald Lynn Humphrey (born March 3, 1969) is an American former professional football player who was a running back for the Indianapolis Colts of the National Football League (NFL) and the San Antonio Matadors of the Spring Football League (SFL). He was selected by the Colts in the eighth round of the 1992 NFL draft. He played college football for the Mississippi Valley State Delta Devils.
