= Brad Seely =

American football player and coach (born 1956)

Personal information
- Born: September 6, 1956 (age 70); Vinton, Iowa, U.S.

Career information
- High school: Baltic (SD)
- College: South Dakota State

Career history
- South Dakota State (1978) Graduate assistant; Colorado State (1979) Graduate assistant; Colorado State (1980) Offensive line coach; Southern Methodist (1981) Assistant offensive line coach; N.C. State (1982) Offensive line coach; Pacific (1983) Offensive line coach; Oklahoma State (1984–1988) Offensive line coach; Indianapolis Colts (1989–1993) Special teams coach & tight ends coach; New York Jets (1994) Special teams coach; Carolina Panthers (1995–1998) Special teams coordinator; New England Patriots (1999–2008) Special teams coordinator; Cleveland Browns (2009–2010) Assistant head coach & special teams coordinator; San Francisco 49ers (2011–2014) Assistant head coach & special teams coordinator; Oakland Raiders (2015–2017) Special teams coordinator; Houston Texans (2018–2019) Special teams coordinator

Awards and highlights
- 3× Super Bowl champion (XXXVI, XXXVIII, XXXIX)

Brad Seely (born September 6, 1956) is an American former football coach.

== Playing career ==
Seely attended South Dakota State University, where he played football and was an All-Conference offensive lineman. He earned degrees in both economics and physical education while there.

== Coaching career ==
=== College ===
Seely began his college coaching career in 1978 with his alma mater South Dakota State. He then moved to Colorado State University as a graduate assistant in 1979 and was promoted to offensive line coach in 1979. Seely also spent a year in 1981 with current Patriots offensive line coach Dante Scarnecchia at Southern Methodist University as an assistant offensive line coach. In 1982, Seely was an offensive line coach for North Carolina State University, then moved to University of the Pacific in the same capacity for 1983. In 1984, Seely rounded out his college career with 5 years at Oklahoma State, coaching an offensive line that led Barry Sanders to the 1988 Heisman Trophy.

=== NFL ===
Seely made the jump to the professional level in 1989, working as the tight ends and special teams coach for the Indianapolis Colts through 1993. He then spent the 1994 season with the New York Jets as their special teams coach. In 1995, Seely began a 4-year stint with the Carolina Panthers also as their special teams coach, winning the NFL Special Teams Coach of the Year Award in 1996. He joined the Patriots on January 27, 1999. Following 10 seasons with the Patriots as their special teams coach under Pete Carroll and Bill Belichick, Seely joined former Patriots assistant Eric Mangini's coaching staff in Cleveland as their assistant head coach and special teams coach in 2009. Beginning in 2011, he is Special Teams Coordinator and Assistant Head Coach with the San Francisco 49ers. He was hired by the Raiders on January 20, 2015. On January 17, 2018, Seely was hired by the Houston Texans as the Special Teams Coordinator. On June 5, 2020, Seely announced his retirement from coaching.

=== Personal life ===
Seely and his wife, Patricia, have three daughters, Sarah, Hannah, and Brynn.
