= San Antonio Matadors =

- Founded: 2000
- Folded: 2000
- League: Spring Football League
- Based in: San Antonio, Texas
- Stadium: Alamo Stadium
- Head coach: Brian Wiggins
- Championships: 1

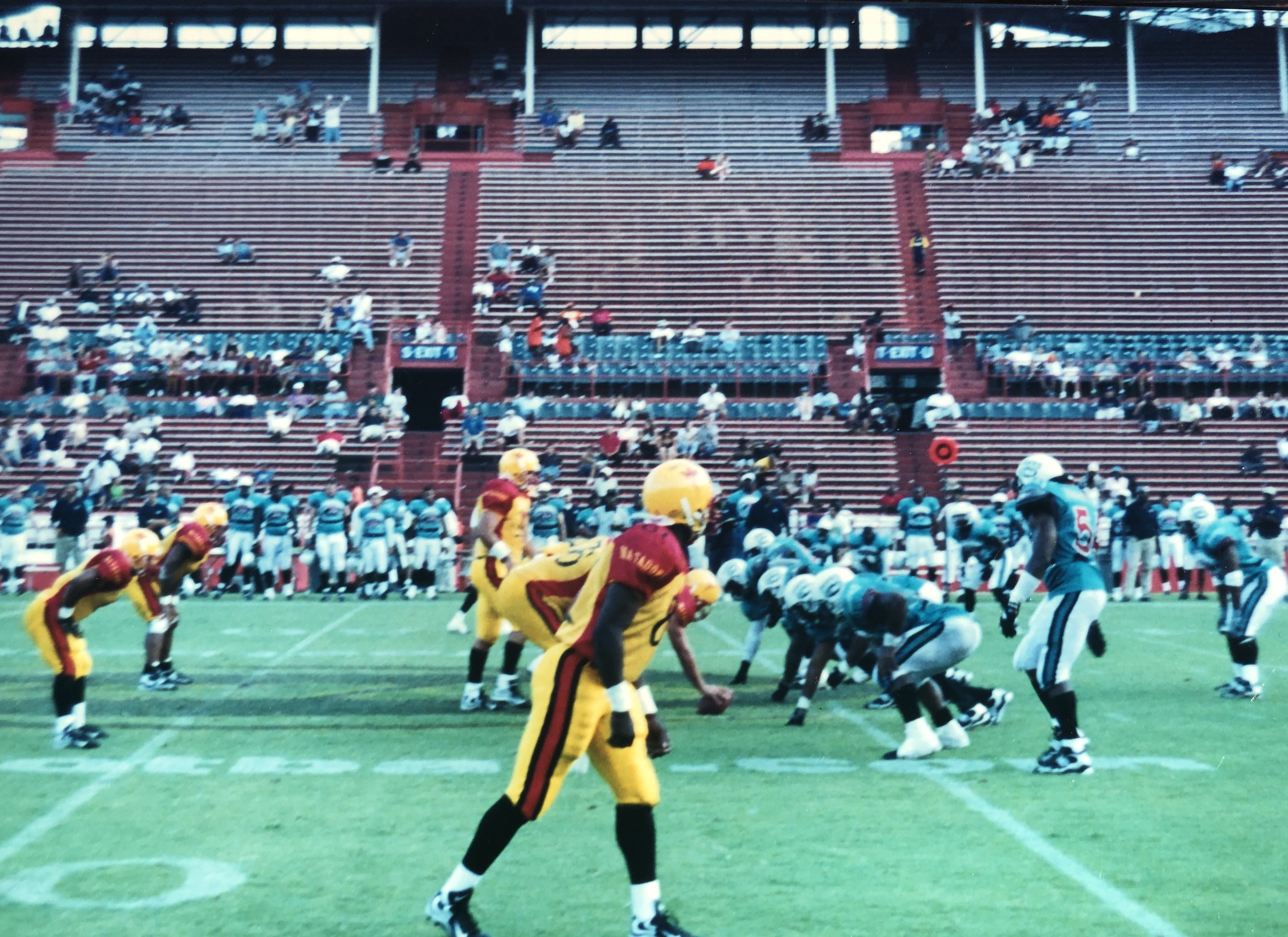
San Antonio Matadors vs Miami Tropics

The San Antonio Matadors were a professional football team that played in the Spring Football League (SFL) in 2000. The Matadors were undefeated before the league decided to cease operations. The Matadors were named co-SFL Champions along with the Houston Marshals. The Head Coach for the Matadors was Brian Wiggins and the Director of Football Operations was Mark Ricker. The team operated in San Antonio, Texas, and home games were played at Alamo Stadium.

Matador players of note:

- Keith Rucker DL (Cincinnati Bengals, Arizona Cardinals, Kansas City Chiefs)
- Ricky Powers RB (Michigan, Cleveland Browns, Baltimore Ravens)
- Ronald Humphrey RB (Indianapolis Colts)
- Errick Herrin LB (USC, Dallas Cowboys, Carolina Panthers, Denver Broncos)
- Johnny Johnson QB (Illinois, Detroit Lions)
- Brandon Harrison WR (Illinois, San Diego Chargers, Philadelphia Eagles)

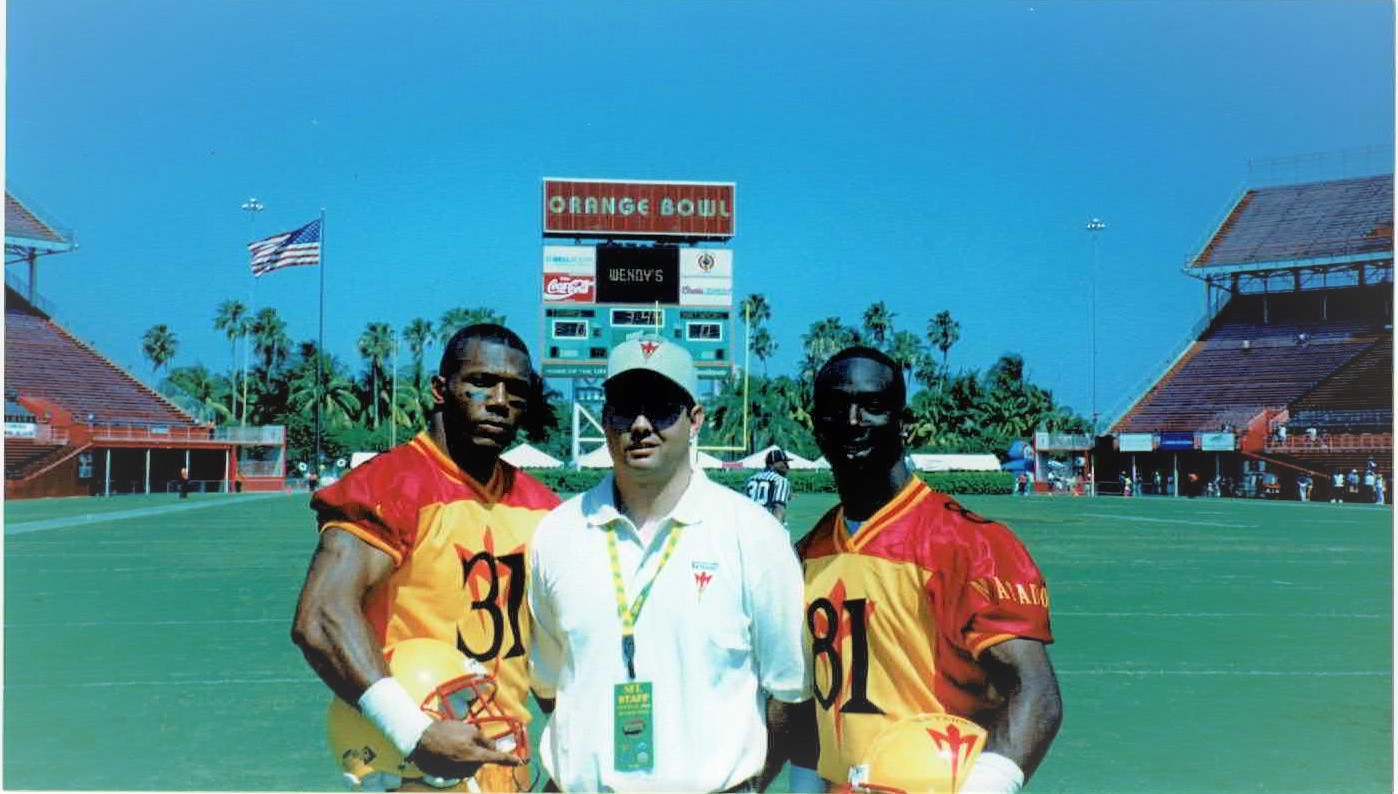
Director of Football Operations Mark Ricker with Ben Carter (left) and Brandon Harrison (right) at the Orange Bowl in Miami

The San Antonio Matadors Cheerleaders were under the direction of Cynthia Trinidad, former Dallas Cowboys Cheerleader and San Antonio Spurs Dancer.
