= Eddie Miller (wide receiver) =

American football player (born 1969)

No. 86
- Position: Wide receiver

Personal information
- Born: June 20, 1969 (age 57); Tumison, Georgia, U.S.
- Listed height: 6 ft 0 in (1.83 m)
- Listed weight: 185 lb (84 kg)

Career information
- High school: Southwest DeKalb
- College: South Carolina
- NFL draft: 1992: 9th round, 225th overall pick

Career history
- Indianapolis Colts (1992–1993)
- Stats at Pro Football Reference

Edward Miller Jr. (born June 20, 1969) is an American former professional football wide receiver in the National Football League (NFL) who played for the Indianapolis Colts. He was selected by the Colts in the ninth round of the 1992 NFL draft with the 225th overall pick. He played college football at University of South Carolina.
