= Nick Nicolau =

American football player and coach (1933–2014)

Biographical details
- Born: May 5, 1933; New York City, New York, U.S.
- Died: December 6, 2014 (aged 81); Wareham, Massachusetts, U.S.

Playing career
- 1957–1959: Southern Connecticut
- Position: Running back

Coaching career (HC unless noted)
- 1960: Southern Connecticut (assistant)
- 1961: Springfield (assistant)
- 1962–1964: Bridgeport (assistant)
- 1965–1969: Bridgeport
- 1970: Massachusetts (RB)
- 1971–1972: Connecticut (assistant)
- 1973–1975: Kentucky (RB)
- 1976: Kent State (assistant)
- 1977: Hamilton Tiger-Cats (RB)
- 1978–1979: Montreal Alouettes (RB)
- 1980: New Orleans Saints (RB)
- 1981: Denver Broncos (special assistant)
- 1982–1987: Denver Broncos (RB)
- 1988: Los Angeles Raiders (WR)
- 1989–1991: Buffalo Bills (WR)
- 1992–1994: Indianapolis Colts (OC)
- 1995–1996: Jacksonville Jaguars (TE)
- 1997–1998: San Diego Chargers (AHC)

Head coaching record
- Overall: 24–22
- Bowls: 0–1

Accomplishments and honors

Championships
- 1 EFC (1969)

Awards
- 2× EFC Coach of the Year (1966, 1969); SCSU Athletic Hall of Fame (1995)

Anthero "Nick" Nicolau (May 5, 1933 – December 6, 2014) was an American football coach. He is known for his tenure as a longtime assistant coach in the National Football League (NFL) and college football. He graduated from Southern Connecticut State University.

He spent most of the 1960s and 1970s coaching at college programs such as Bridgeport (Head Coach), Massachusetts, Connecticut, Kentucky, and Kent State.

Nicolau broke into the NFL with the New Orleans Saints in 1980 under then head coach Dick Stanfel. He moved on to the Denver Broncos, coaching the running backs from 1981 through 1987. Some of the players he coached included Dave Preston, Sammy Winder, and Steve Sewell.

A dispute ended his tenure in Denver. He landed with the Los Angeles Raiders, but got into a dispute with another assistant coach, Art Shell. Shell was supported by owner and managing partner Al Davis, who fired Nicolau. He then went to the Buffalo Bills and served as their wide receivers coach from 1989 to 1991. There he worked with talents such as Andre Reed and Don Beebe. It was rumored that Nicolau left Buffalo due to a dispute with offensive line coach Tom Bresnahan who became offensive coordinator the next season.

In 1992, he became the offensive coordinator of the Indianapolis Colts under head coach Ted Marchibroda with whom he worked in Buffalo. He helped the Colts to a 9–7 record in 1992 and an 8–8 record in 1994. He helped develop Reggie Langhorne as a receiver and worked with quarterback Jeff George as well. In 1994, he helped turn running back Marshall Faulk as a rookie while also working with both Jim Harbaugh and Don Majkowski at quarterback.

Nicolau then spent two seasons coaching the tight ends for the Jacksonville Jaguars, helping to develop Pete Mitchell as a blocker and receiver. In 1997, Jaguars offensive coordinator Kevin Gilbride became the head coach of the San Diego Chargers and Nicolau followed him to California. There he served two years as the Chargers assistant head coach before retiring after the 1998 NFL season. He died at age 81 on December 6, 2014.

== Head coaching record ==
Year	Team	Overall	Conference	Standing	Bowl/playoffs
Bridgeport Purple Knights (Eastern Football Conference) (1965–1969)
1965	Bridgeport	3–6	1–3	4th	
1966	Bridgeport	7–3	3–1	2nd	
1967	Bridgeport	2–6	2–2	3rd	
1968	Bridgeport	4–5	3–2	T–2nd	
1969	Bridgeport	8–2	4–0	1st	L Knute Rockne Bowl
Bridgeport:		24–22	13–8		
Total:		24–22			
National championship Conference title Conference division title or championship game berth
