= Lanier Middle School =

Lanier Middle School may refer to:

- Bob Lanier Middle School, formerly Sidney Lanier Junior High School/Middle School, in Houston, Texas, United States
- Lanier Middle School (Sugar Hill, Georgia) in Sugar Hill, Georgia, United States
- Katherine Johnson Middle School, formerly known as Sidney Lanier Middle School in Fairfax, Virginia, United States
