= San Antonio Independent School District =

School district in Texas, United States

Address
- 514 W. Quincy St. San Antonio, Texas; United States
- Coordinates: 29°25′2.4″N 98°29′15.1″W

District information
- Grades: PreK–12th grade
- Established: May 2, 1899
- Superintendent: Adrian Bustillos
- Governing agency: Texas Education Agency

Students and staff
- Students: 44,710 (2021–22)
- Teachers: 3,134.79 (FTE) (2021–22)
- Staff: 3,702.35 (FTE) (2021–22)
- Student–teacher ratio: 14.26 (2021–22)

Other information
- Website: saisd.net

San Antonio Independent School District is a school district based in San Antonio, Texas, United States.

San Antonio ISD ranks as the 13th largest of Texas' 1,057 school districts. The District encompasses 79 square miles (200 km^{2}) with a total population of 306,943 (2010 U.S. Census). San Antonio ISD serves the Downtown, Midtown, and inner city areas of the city of San Antonio and a small portion of the city of Balcones Heights. With over 48,720 students (as of 2018), the district is the third largest school district in the Bexar County area.

== Superintendents ==
- 1875–?, C. Plagge
- 1919–1923, Annie Webb Blanton
- 1946–1963, Thomas B. Portwood
- 1994–1998, Diana Lam
- 1998–1999, David F. Splitek (interim)
- 1999–2006, Rubén D. Olivárez
- 2006–2012, Robert Duron
- 2012–2015, Sylvester Perez (interim and permanent)
- 2015–2021, Pedro Martinez
- 2021–2022, Robert A. Jaklich (interim)
- 2022–2027, Jaime Aquino (Superintendent Emeritus)
- 2026-present, Adrian Bustillos

== Board of trustees ==
2010-11 President, James Howard Vice-president, Carlos Villarreal Secretary, Thomas C. Lopez Asst. Secretary, Olga Hernandez Member, Ruben D. Cuero Member, Adela R. Segovia Member, Ed Garza

2011-12 President, James Howard Vice-president, Carlos Villarreal Secretary, Adela R. Segovia Asst. Secretary, Olga Hernandez Member, Ruben D. Cuero Member, Ed Garza Member, Patti Radle

2012-13 President, Ed Garza Vice-president, Ruben D. Cuero Secretary, Olga Hernandez Asst. Secretary, Adela R. Segovia Member, Debra Guerrero Member, James Howard Member, Patti Radle

2013-14 President, Ed Garza Vice-president, Olga Hernandez Secretary, Arthur V. Valdez Asst. Secretary, James Howard Member, Debra Guerrero Member, Steve Lecholop Member, Patti Radle

2019-20 President, Patti Radle Vice-president, Arthur V. Valdez Secretary, Debra Guerrero Asst. Secretary, Steve Lecholop Member, Alicia M. Perry Member, Christina Martinez Member, Ed Garza

2021-22 President, Christina Martinez Vice-president, Alicia Sebastian Secretary, Arthur V. Valdez Member, Sarah Sorensen Member, Leticia Ozuna Member, Patti Radle Member, Ed Garza

== History ==
While San Antonio public schools were established by the City Council in 1854, it wasn't until May 2, 1899, that the school system became an independent district with the formation of its own board of trustees. San Antonio ISD received its first charter from the state of Texas in 1903.

One of San Antonio's most outstanding assets is the preservation of its historic sites and neighborhoods, most of which are found within SAISD. All have active neighborhood associations.

SAISD is the tenth-largest public employer in San Antonio, with more than 7,000 employees serving about 49,000 students. The District's resources consist of local, state, and federal revenue.

Local revenue consists primarily of property taxes and also includes local grant donations. State revenue accounts for the District's largest share of revenue and is mainly driven by Average Daily Attendance (ADA) and the District's total property value. Federal revenue is a minor component of the operating budget but the major source of revenue for the Food Service Fund and is driven by the number of meals served and the number of students who qualify for the free- and reduced-price lunch program.

The District was involved directly in the San Antonio Independent School District v. Rodriguez Supreme Court case, and indirectly in the United States v. Lopez Supreme Court case.

In the 2016–2017 school year, about 5,050 students went from SAISD to charter schools, and in the last part of the 2017–2018 school year that number increased to about 10,100, while about 200 students living in SAISD were in other school districts. For the 2018–2019 school year the district ended the employment of 132 teachers over budget cuts, and budget was reduced by 6%, totaling $31 million. By 2018, in a response to a decline in enrollment, the district repurposed several campuses as magnet schools or specialty schools to attract parents who would otherwise put their children in private school.

In 2023, there was a proposal to close 19 schools.

== Demographics ==
As of 2018, 91% of the students are considered low income. As of that year, people transferring from other school districts to SAISD tended to live in more upscale communities.

== School uniforms ==
Some San Antonio ISD students at certain schools are required to wear school uniforms. Students are required to wear white collared shirts and khaki bottoms. They are also permitted to wear polo shirts with their schools' colors. The Texas Education Agency specifies that the parents and/or guardians of students zoned to a school with uniforms may apply for a waiver to opt out of the uniform policy so their children do not have to wear the uniform; parents must specify "bona fide" reasons, such as religious reasons or philosophical objections.

== Schools ==
=== High schools ===
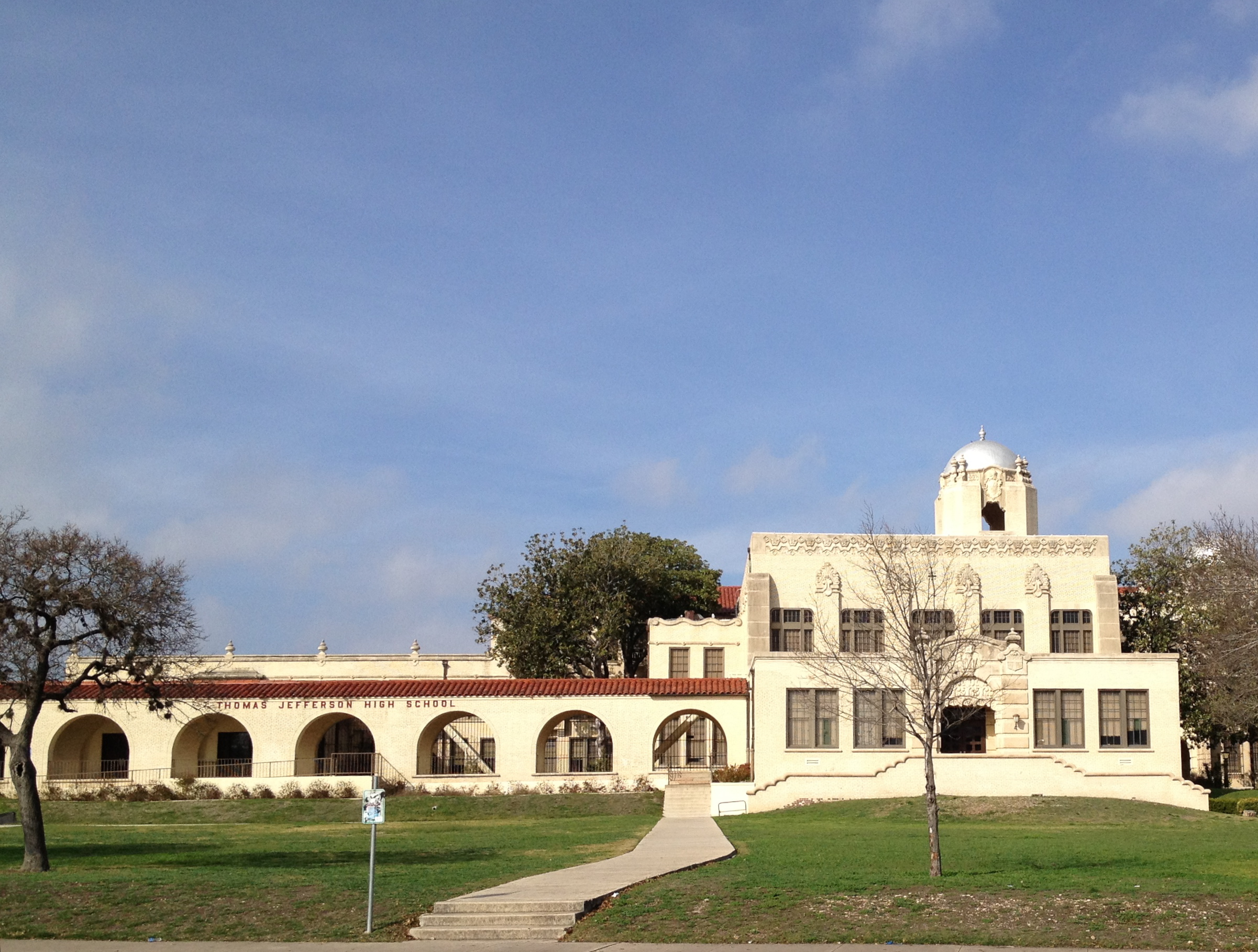
Thomas Jefferson High School

- G.W. Brackenridge High School
  - Brackenridge won the 1947 UIL state football championship, the last title before the UIL divided schools into classifications based on enrollment.
- Luther Burbank High School
- Center for Applied Science & Technology (CAST Tech) High School
  - The school, designed by H-E-B CEO Charles Butt and inspired by the High Tech High charter schools system, opened with the ninth grade in fall 2017. Its initial enrollment was 175.
- Thomas Edison High School
- Fox Technical High School
- Highlands High School
- Sam Houston High School
- Thomas Jefferson High School
- Sidney Lanier High School
- Phoenix Middle College (10-12) (It is a program)
- St. Philip's Early College High School
- Travis Early College High School

=== Middle schools ===
- S.J. Davis Middle School
- Joel C. Harris Middle School (Charter)
- Henry Wadsworth Longfellow Middle School
- Hot Wells Middle School
- George E. Kelly Academy
- Edgar Allan Poe STEM Dual Language Middle School (Charter)
- Jeremiah Rhodes Middle School
- Harry H. Rogers College Prep Middle School
- Fidel L. Tafolla Middle School
- John Greenleaf Whittier Academy

=== Academies ===
- Advanced Learning Academy at Fox Tech (PK-12)
- Beacon Hill Academy (PK-7)
- James Bonham Academy (K-8)
- Bowden Academy - As per a 2016 bond it is scheduled to get a $11.1 million refurbishment. Brian Sparks, in 2018, served as principal at both Bowden and Lamar Elementary, and he was making efforts to improve Bowden's performance levels to that of Lamar's. As of 2018 a significant number of parents zoned to Bowden instead send their children to other schools, public and private. Most people residing in the area are of a lower socioeconomic strata although by 2018 gentrification of the area began. Aliyya Swaby and Alexa Ura of Texas Tribune, in 2018, described it as "drab and dimly lit" and that it "is still struggling".
- James Fenimore Cooper Academy (K-12)
- Agnes Cotton Academy (PK-8)
- David Crockett Academy (PK-7)
- Frederick Douglass Academy (PK-7), formerly the Rincon School
- Marin B. Fenwick Academy (PK-7)
- Muriel Vance Forbes Academy (PK-7)
- Inez Foster Academy (PK-7)
- Robert B. Green Academy (K-8)
- Nathaniel Hawthorne Academy (K-8)
- Ferdinand Herff Academy (PK-7)
- Irving Dual Language Academy (PK-8)
- Eloise Japhet Academy (PK-7)
- Martin Luther King Jr. Academy (K-8)
- Antonio Margil Academy (PK-7)
- Mission Academy (PK-8)
- Ira C. Ogden Academy (PK-7)
- Laura Steele Montessori Academy (PK-8)
- Mark Twain Dual Language Academy (PK-3)
- Riverside Park Academy (PK-7)
- Will Rogers Academy (PK-7)
- Woodlawn Academy (K-8)
- Young Men's Leadership Academy (4-9)
- Young Women's Leadership Academy (6-12)
  - YWLA was ranked #1 in Texas (2012-2013)
  - The school, as of December 2016 also ranked as exemplary by the Texas Education Agency, has a college readiness focus with an emphasis on science, technology, engineering and math.

=== Elementary schools ===
- Charles August Arnold Elementary School
- Charles Clyde Ball Elementary
- Barkley-Ruiz Elementary School
- Mildred Baskin Elementary School
- J.T. Brackenridge Elementary School
- Andrew Briscoe Elementary School
- Bella Cameron Elementary School
- Collins Garden Elementary School
- Lorenzo De Zavala Elementary School
- Frederick Douglass Elementary School
- Marin B. Fenwick Academy
- Benjamin Franklin Elementary School
- Samuel Houston Gates Elementary School
- Charles Graebner Elementary School
- Highland Hills Elementary School
- Highland Park Elementary School
- Hillcrest Elementary School
- Herman Hirsch Elementary School
- Mary Huppertz Elementary School
- George E. Kelly Academy
- Sarah King Elementary School
- Mirabeau B. Lamar Elementary School - As of 2018 the student body was majority Hispanic but the school's attendance area was experiencing gentrification. The school has a dual English-Spanish program. Sparks, also principal at Bowden Academy, served as principal of Lamar since circa 2013 That year Swaby and Ura stated that "Over the last five years, Sparks has made Lamar a winner with the help of an engaged corps of parents".
- James Madison Elementary School
- Samuel A. Maverick Elementary School
- Dorie Miller Academy
- Elma A. Neal Elementary School
- John J. Pershing Elementary School
- Cleto L. Rodriguez Montessori Elementary School
- Foster Academy
- Smith Elementary School
- Democracy Prep at the Stewart Campus
- Ollie Perry Storm Elementary School
- Booker T. Washington Elementary School
- Woodrow Wilson Elementary School
- Woodlawn Hills Elementary School

=== Early childhood education centers ===
- Henry Carroll Early Childhood Education Center
- Esther Perez Carvajal Early Childhood Education Center
- Rafael Gonzales Early Childhood Education Center
- Wilbur J. Knox Early Childhood Education Center
- Pauline Nelson Early Childhood Education Center
- Elizabeth Tynan Early Childhood Education Center

=== Special campuses ===
- Cooper Academy at Navarro (9-12)
- Estrada Alternative Center (7-12)
- Brewer Academy (6-12)

== See also ==
- List of school districts in Texas
