= Lanier High School (San Antonio) =

Sidney Lanier High School

Location
- 1514 West Cesar E. Chavez Boulevard; San Antonio, Bexar County, Texas; United States; 29.421801°N 98.516491°W

Information
- Established: 1915
- Locale: City: Large
- School district: San Antonio ISD
- NCES School ID: 483873004370
- Principal: Dr.Rick Flores
- Faculty: 96.92 (on an FTE basis)
- Grades: 9–12
- Enrollment: 1,547 (2022–2023)
- Student to teacher ratio: 15.96
- Colors: Blue and White and Grey
- Mascot: "Vok" (Mechanical gear)
- Yearbook: Los Recuerdos
- Website: Official website

Sidney Lanier High School is a local public high school of the San Antonio Independent School District in the westside of San Antonio, Texas and classified as a 5A school by the University Interscholastic League. During 2022–2023, Lanier High School had an enrollment of 1,547 students and a student to teacher ratio of 96.92. The school received an overall rating of "C" from the Texas Education Agency for the 2024–2025 school year.

== History ==
Sidney Lanier High School serves 9th through 12th grade students and opened in 1915 as McKinley Elementary School. In 1923, McKinley was renamed after Confederate poet Sidney Lanier in accordance with the District's practice of naming the junior schools after American authors. Lanier was a junior-senior high school from 1929 until 1969, when Tafolla Middle School opened. The new Lanier Campus, on the site of the old school, opened in 1975.

From 1967 to 1969, a group of students challenged and changed the curricular structure because of vocational tracking and insufficient academic college preparation. Student leaders, including Homer Garcia, Edgar Lozano, Stephen Castro, and Irene Ramirez, challenged the authority of the school and staged a walkout that catapulted Sidney Lanier into the limelight and forced the district to adapt to changes. Other students involved indirectly were members of the Mexican American Youth Organization (MAYO) started by Mario Compean, Jose Angel Gutierrez, and Ignacio Garcia, all students at St. Mary's University. Student leaders from Edgewood High School and even former Central Catholic High School students contributed ideas and participatory support. School administrators appointed Pablo Ortiz as Student Council President after Homer Garcia was deemed too disruptive and radical. Later, school administrators bowed to student and community pressure, conceding to demands. Even though a massive walkout was averted, some students did stage their protest march and left campus during lunch. Ultimately, the legacy benefited students so that more scholarships were awarded. The 1969 graduate, Homer Garcia, forged alliances with other campus leaders and graduated from the University of Texas and received a Ph.D. in sociology from Yale University. Other alumni from that year went on to author books and became professors and writers (Rafael Castillo, Ignacio Garcia, David O. Martinez and Daniel Hernandez). Rafael C. Castillo's (2023) "Dostoevsky on Guadalupe Street: Writings from the Edge" highlights some of those events and insight into the culture of social protest activity from a literary perspective.

In 1970, Lanier became one of the first schools in the U.S. to offer mariachi classes due to the efforts of education advocate Belle Ortiz. Classes spread to other districts and schools, remaining in the curriculum well into the 2020s.

== Traditions ==
Their mascot is a Vok, a gear emblem which symbolizes a smaller part of a big machine. Ultimately, the Vok represents an essential gear that would not function without support from its integral whole therefore analogous to a vocational student entering society and the workforce. Sidney Lanier was one of the first vocational schools in the westside of San Antonio. The school's most popular event, "The Chili Bowl," an annual football game played yearly against its rival Fox Tech High School since 1932, was popular until Fox Tech closed. Although the term "Chili Bowl" has an underlying negative connotation with a racist tint, the alumni adopted it nonetheless and reversed its negative effects by owning it. The district, however, announced in November 2009 that it would discontinue sports at Fox Tech as part of its plan to convert Fox Tech into a magnet school (football to be discontinued after the 2009-2010 year, and the remaining sports after two more years), thus ending the event after 2009. The Lanier Voks ended up winning the last game over the Buffaloes, 30–14. Afterward, both of the teams gathered in the center of Alamo Stadium, the place where this historic event was held, and took time to reflect on what this tradition meant to them, and how it felt to take part in this game. They joined in a chant, "Brothers!" and left after few photo-ops.

== Athletics ==
The Lanier Voks compete in the following sports:

- Baseball
- Basketball
- Cross Country
- Football
- Golf
- Soccer
- Softball
- Swimming and Diving
- Tennis
- Track and Field
- Volleyball
