= Spring Football League =

American former professional gridiron football league

- Sport: American football
- Founded: 2000
- Ceased: 2000
- Commissioner: Bill Futterer
- No. of teams: 4
- Last champions: San Antonio Matadors, Houston Marshals

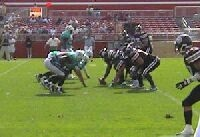
Houston Marshals vs Miami Tropics

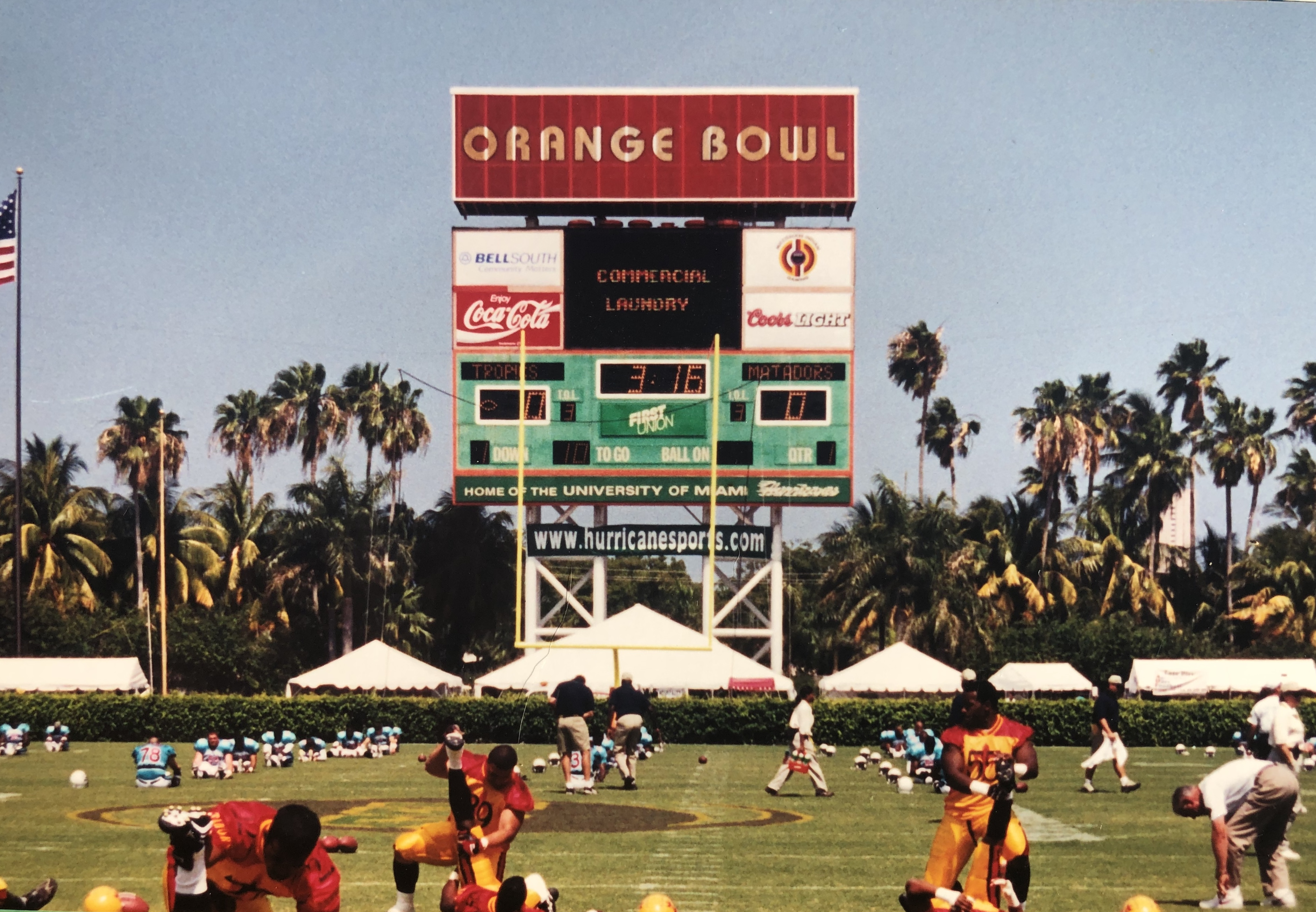
The San Antonio Matadors and the Miami Tropics played the last professional game at the Orange Bowl.

The Spring Football League (SFL) was a professional American football minor league that existed for one abbreviated season in 2000.

== Spring football ==
Founded by several ex-NFL players such as Eric Dickerson, Drew Pearson, Bo Jackson, and Tony Dorsett, the SFL planned to use the four-game mini-season (dubbed "Festival 2000") to test cities, fans, stadiums, the media, entertainment, and springtime American football as a product. The year before, the Regional Football League staggered through a spring season, then announced it would not return for 2000.

In late 1999, the SFL announced an inaugural season of 2000, with ten individually-owned teams playing a 12-week schedule, followed by a championship game during Memorial Day weekend. Mark Rice, chairman of the SFL board of governors, placed eight of the franchises in Birmingham; Canton, Ohio; Houston; Jackson, Mississippi; Los Angeles; Miami; San Antonio and Washington, D.C. On March 1, 2000, the SFL announced the league had scaled down to four teams that would play four-game schedules on Saturdays from April 29, followed by a championship game in Miami on May 27.

== Teams ==
Team	City	Stadium	Head coach
Houston Marshals	Houston, Texas	Robertson Stadium	Ray Woodard
Miami Tropics	Miami, Florida	Miami Orange Bowl	Jim Jensen
San Antonio Matadors	San Antonio, Texas	Alamo Stadium	Brian Wiggins
Los Angeles Dragons	Los Angeles, California	Los Angeles Memorial Coliseum	Doug Cosbie

SFL teams consisted of 38 players, each of whom would receive $1,200 per game with a $200 winners bonus.

The league's games included pre-game and half-time shows featuring national musical acts (such as The O'Jays, Mark Wills, and Poncho Sanchez), a pronounced effort to attract both African-Americans and Latino fans, and innovative use of wireless communication.

SFL coaches of note:

- Lew Carpenter – Green Bay Packers
- Guy McIntyre – San Francisco 49ers
- Doug Cosbie – Dallas Cowboys
- Keith Millard – Minnesota Vikings
- Jim Jensen – Miami Dolphins
- Hugh Green – Miami Dolphins
- David Little – Pittsburgh Steelers
- Neal Colzie – Oakland Raiders
- Donald Hollas – Oakland Raiders
- Don Narcisse – Saskatchewan Roughriders

== Mini-season cut short ==
The Spring Football League suffered from a distinct lack of media attention: newspaper coverage was spotty at best, and the SFL had no radio or TV contracts (although some games were apparently carried on the internet). Attendance was disastrously low, despite some very competitive contests; only 1,100 people showed up at the one game played at cavernous Los Angeles Coliseum. The SFL wasn't even able to finish out its modest, one-month season—league officials ended the test program after only two weeks and four games. Houston and San Antonio, both with 2–0 records, were declared league co-champions.

The SFL planned to return in 2001 with at least eight teams. However, with funding for the league having been provided by tech-stock entrepreneurs, any chance that the SFL would return was scotched by the tech-market crash of 2000 and the subsequent announcement of the XFL by the WWF.

The last professional football game played at the Miami Orange Bowl was an SFL game: a crowd estimated at "less than a thousand" watched on April 29, 2000 as the San Antonio Matadors defeated the Miami Tropics, 16-14.
