= Houston Marshals =

- Founded: 2000
- Folded: 2000
- League: Spring Football League
- Based in: Houston, Texas
- Stadium: Robertson Stadium
- Head coach: Ray Woodard
- Championships: 1

The Houston Marshals were a professional football team based in Houston, Texas, that played in the Spring Football League in 2000. The Marshals were coached by former Denver Broncos player Ray Woodard. They played their home games at Robertson Stadium on the University of Houston campus.

The Marshals were stocked heavily on former Texas A&M Aggies. Randy McCown, the oldest of three brothers who would also play professional football (younger brothers Josh and Luke would have significantly longer professional careers), was the team's quarterback.

The Marshals won both games on their schedule, defeating the Los Angeles Dragons and Miami Tropics, before the league abruptly ended its season and ceased operations. The Marshals and the San Antonio Matadors were named league co-champions.

Marshals players of note:

- Shon Mitchell - (Texas, San Francisco 49ers)
- Sterling Palmer - (Florida State, Washington Redskins)
- Dion Foxx - (Miami Dolphins)
- Nicky Savoie - (LSU, New Orleans Saints)
- Anthony Bright - (Carolina Panthers)

A fantasy version of this team was featured on Madden NFL.
