= Randy McCown =

American football player (born 1977)

No. 15
- Position: Quarterback

Personal information
- Born: February 16, 1977 (age 49); Jacksonville, Texas, U.S.
- Listed height: 6 ft 1 in (1.85 m)
- Listed weight: 213 lb (97 kg)

Career information
- High school: Jacksonville
- College: Texas A&M (1995–1999)
- NFL draft: 2000: undrafted

Career history
- Houston Marshals (2000); Houston ThunderBears (2001)*
- * Offseason or practice squad member only

Peter Randolph McCown (born February 16, 1977) is an American former football quarterback. He played college football for the Texas A&M Aggies and professionally for the Houston Marshals of the Spring Football League (SFL) and the Houston ThunderBears of the Arena Football League (AFL). He is the older brother of NFL quarterbacks Josh, and Luke McCown.

== Early life ==
McCown played at Jacksonville High School in Jacksonville, Texas, for coach Danny Long. He was a consensus Texas Top 100 selection after completing 115-of-210 passes (52.3%) for 1,439 yards and 5 touchdowns as a senior. In his three years as a starter, McCown completed 302-of-523 passes (57.7%) for 32 Touchdowns and 8 Interceptions. He was a member of the Dave Campbell's Football magazine Super Team. He also was a standout basketball player earning All State honors and once recording 47 points in a victory over Carthage High School.

== College career ==
McCown was redshirted for the 1995 season.

McCown played in seven games as a reserve, completing 11-of-27 passes for 186 yards with no touchdowns and 1 interception. McCown came into the Oklahoma State game with a 17–13 lead in the third quarter and guided the Aggies to a 38–19 victory, completing 5-of-11 passes for 108 yards.

Shared the starting duties with Branndon Stewart for the first seven games of the season, and earned his first career start in a game against Texas Tech. Overall, he played in 11 games and completed 48-of-84 passes (57.1%) for 602 yards and 2 touchdowns. His best game was against Iowa State when he completed 11-of-14 passes for 141 yards with a touchdown. He was 3 of 6 against UCLA in the Southwestern Bell Cotton Bowl Classic.

McCown won the starting quarterback job after connected on 11-of-13 passes for 167 and 2 touchdowns off the bench against North Texas. He started the next five games including a win against #2 Nebraska in which he connected with Chris Taylor for an 81-yard bomb for the first score. He suffered a separated shoulder against Oklahoma State and did not play the following week against Oklahoma due to the injury, but returned to the starting lineup against Mizzou and Texas. McCown missed the Big 12 Championship Game and the Nokia Sugar Bowl due to a broken collarbone suffered diving for a touchdown in the fourth quarter against Texas. On the season, he completed 66-of-130 passes for 1,025 yards and 6 touchdowns and 3 interceptions. Had 91 carries for 139 yards, the most by an Aggie quarterback since Bucky Richardson rushed for 423 yards in 1991. His best passing game was against Baylor when he completed 9-of-14 passes for 195 yards. McCown helped lead the Aggies to an 11–3 record, a tie for the 2nd most wins in one season in Texas A&M history. In addition, 1998 was the Aggies' only BCS Bowl appearance and Big 12 Championship win to date.

Led the Aggies to an appearance against Penn State in the Alamo Bowl. The season highlight was a win over #5 Texas before a then record of 86,128 fans at Kyle Field, just days after 12 Texas A&M students were killed in the Aggie Bonfire tragedy. Texas A&M sealed the win with just over five minutes left in the game when receiver Matt Bumgardner caught a 14-yard pass from McCown, to give the Aggies the 20–16 win. "You can't put in into words," McCown said. "A game like this is something you wish for all your life. When we came out for the second half, we saw that the crowd didn't give up and believed in us."

On the season, McCown completed 152-of-295 passes for 2,374 yards and 14 touchdowns. His passing yardage ranked No. 2 in school history at the time behind Kevin Murray’s 2,463-yard effort in 1986. His 14 passing touchdowns at the time tied for No. 5 on the school list. Both his completions and attempts in 1999 rank in the top 10 in school history. He connected with Chris Taylor for a 96-yard bomb for a touchdown against Tulsa, which ranks as the longest play from scrimmage in school history. He passed for more the 300 yards twice, with his 363-yard effort against Kansas ranking No. 3 in school history, and his 320 passing yards vs. Tulsa ranks No. 6.

=== Statistics ===
Year	Team	Passing					
Year	Team	Att	Cmp	Pct	Yds	TD	Int
1995	Texas A&M	DNP					
1996	Texas A&M	27	11	40.7	186	0	1
1997	Texas A&M	84	48	57.1	602	2	0
1998	Texas A&M	130	66	50.8	1,025	6	3
1999	Texas A&M	295	152	51.5	2,374	14	10
Career		536	277	51.7	4,187	22	14

== Professional career ==
In 2000, McCown played quarterback for the Houston Marshals of the Spring Football League (SFL).

On March 9, 2001, McCown signed with the Houston ThunderBears of the Arena Football League (AFL). He was waived by the ThunderBears on April 11, 2001.
