= Nicky Savoie =

American football player (born 1973)

Nick Savoie
No. 85, 88
- Position: Tight end

Personal information
- Born: September 21, 1973 (age 53); Cut Off, Louisiana, U.S.
- Listed height: 6 ft 5 in (1.96 m)
- Listed weight: 253 lb (115 kg)

Career information
- High school: South Lafourche (Cut Off)
- College: Mississippi Gulf Coast CC; LSU
- NFL draft: 1997: 6th round, 165th overall pick

Career history
- New Orleans Saints (1997); New Orleans Thunder (1999); Houston Marshals (2000); Birmingham Thunderbolts (2001); Houma Bayou Bucks (2002)

Career NFL statistics
- Receptions: 1
- Receiving yards: 14
- Stats at Pro Football Reference

Nicky John Savoie (born September 21, 1973) is an American former professional football player who was a tight end for one season in the National Football League (NFL) with the New Orleans Saints.

Savoie was born in Cut Off, Louisiana, and attended South Lafourche High School. He attended Louisiana State University, where he played college football for the LSU Tigers. He was selected by the Saints in the sixth round of the 1997 NFL draft with the 165th overall pick. During the 1997 NFL season, Savoie appeared in one game with the Saints, making one reception for 14 yards. Savoie later played for the New Orleans Thunder of the short-lived Regional Football League in 1999, the Houston Marshals of the Spring Football League in 2000 and the Houma Bayou Bucks of the National Indoor Football League in 2002.
