= James Noble (American football) =

American football player (born 1963)

No. 83, 87
- Position: Wide receiver

Personal information
- Born: August 14, 1963 (age 63); Jacksonville, Texas, U.S.
- Listed height: 6 ft 0 in (1.83 m)
- Listed weight: 193 lb (88 kg)

Career information
- High school: Jacksonville
- College: Stephen F. Austin
- NFL draft: 1986: undrafted

Career history
- Washington Redskins (1986); Indianapolis Colts (1987); Toronto Argonauts (1988)

Career NFL statistics
- Receptions: 10
- Receiving yards: 78
- Touchdowns: 2
- Stats at Pro Football Reference

James Brown Noble Jr. (born August 14, 1963) is an American former professional football player who was a wide receiver in the National Football League (NFL) for the Washington Redskins and the Indianapolis Colts. He played college football for the Stephen F. Austin Lumberjacks.
