= National Football League Quarterback Challenge =

National Football League quarterback competition

The NFL's Quarterback Challenge, created by the Challenge Group, LLC, was an annual competition of National Football League quarterbacks, sponsored in part by DirecTV, produced by NFL Players Inc. and NFL QB Greats. The first NFL Quarterback Challenge took place in 1990 on the island of Kauai. Previously it was sponsored by 989 Sports and in 2005 by Electronic Arts EA Sports.

Each of the quarterback challenges had different events that would test each quarterback's skills, with points being given to each quarterback. Whichever quarterback had the most points at the end of all the events, would win the challenge, with rewards also given to the quarterback who won each event. The events included the following:

Speed and Mobility : Penalties for knocking over obstacles and missing targets Bonus for hitting the bullseye or inner ring Top two advance to the final round QBC 7.61 seconds (Rick Mirer, 1995)

For this event, each quarterback would go run a slalom-like course, where they would have to run around cones, past cardboard cutouts of defenders, and a jump over a small hurdle and throw a pass at a target. Depending on where the target was hit by the football, the quarterback would have fractions of a second deducted from their overall time, such as .5 seconds being deducted if the quarterback hits the bullseye, or .25 seconds if they hit the outer ring of the target. The fastest time, including the deductions, was the winner. Course outline: 1st Duck back right, run around the cone 2nd through ring 3rd run left 4th run right right 5th over hurdle 6th throw into ring; red = 0.5 bonus, white = 0.25 bonus, grey = 0.00

Accuracy: 30 seconds to complete the course, closer to bullseye = higher score. Highest possible score - 84 points QBC record - Troy Aikman, 70 points (1995) 1st cart; 6, 8, 10 points over 3 balls, cart cutting diagonal right to left like a post route Max score 30 2nd group; 6, 8, 10 points over 3 balls, cart cutting left to right like an in route Max score 30 3rd group; 12,18 24 points over 1 ball, deep post about 40 yards Max score 24

- All cart movements are inverted opposite for lefty QBs

Long Distance: Each quarterback tries to throw a football as far as they can, with the quarterbacks with the top three distances getting a chance to try again. The quarterbacks also have to keep the balls in bounds, or their throws wouldn't count. The winner of the event was the quarterback with the longest pass. Better of 2 throws count IF tie, 1 throw shoot out 2 points awarded every yard past 50 yards QBC record - Vinny Testaverde, 80 yards (1998)

Read & Recognition: Each quarterback throws a football at moving targets, but only the targets designated by a yellow flag, with each quarterback having four attempts.

If tie, 1 throw shootout Highest possible score: 192 4 attempts aiming for short, medium or long targets Short; 6,8,12 one from left, one from right crossing Medium; 18,27,36 one from left, one from right crossing Long; 30,45,60 (2 chances only)

QBC record - Neil O'Donnell (1996) & Brett Favre (1997), 111 points

== Video games ==
NFL-licensed NFL Quarterback Challenge, created by ProAppSports and produced by Adisoft Studios is currently available on Apple's iPhone and iPod Touch devices. An officially NFL-licensed Quarterback Challenge appeared in 2 other different console video games. Both video game versions appeared in the same Quarterback Club series of games by Acclaim Entertainment. The Quarterback Challenge mode appeared in the first and last versions of the game series. The first was in the original Quarterback Club game released in 1994 on the Super Nintendo Entertainment System and Sega Genesis. The second and final appearance of the challenge was in NFL QB Club 2002, published in 2001 for the PlayStation 2 and GameCube. The first version was a sprite-based 2D game, while the later version was fully 3D. Both of these games and all games in this series were developed by Iguana Entertainment in Austin, Texas. The 1994 SNES/Genesis version was produced by Russell Byrd. The 2001 PS2/GameCube version was produced by Charles Normann.

== Discontinued ==
In November 2007, the NFL cancelled Quarterback Challenge. Cayman Islands Tourism confirmed on March 8, 2008, that the NFL officially discontinued the competition indefinitely.

== Winners ==
- 1990 Ken O'Brien
- 1991 Dan Marino
- 1992 Dan Marino
- 1993 Jeff Hostetler
- 1994 Randall Cunningham
- 1995 Randall Cunningham
- 1996 Neil O'Donnell
- 1997 Vinny Testaverde
- 1998 Jim Harbaugh
- 1999 Jake Plummer
- 2000 Jake Plummer
- 2001 Trent Dilfer
- 2002 Jeff Garcia
- 2003 Brad Johnson
- 2004 Matt Hasselbeck
- 2005 Jake Delhomme
- 2006 Chris Simms
- 2007 Josh McCown
