= Jacksonville High School (Jacksonville, Texas) =

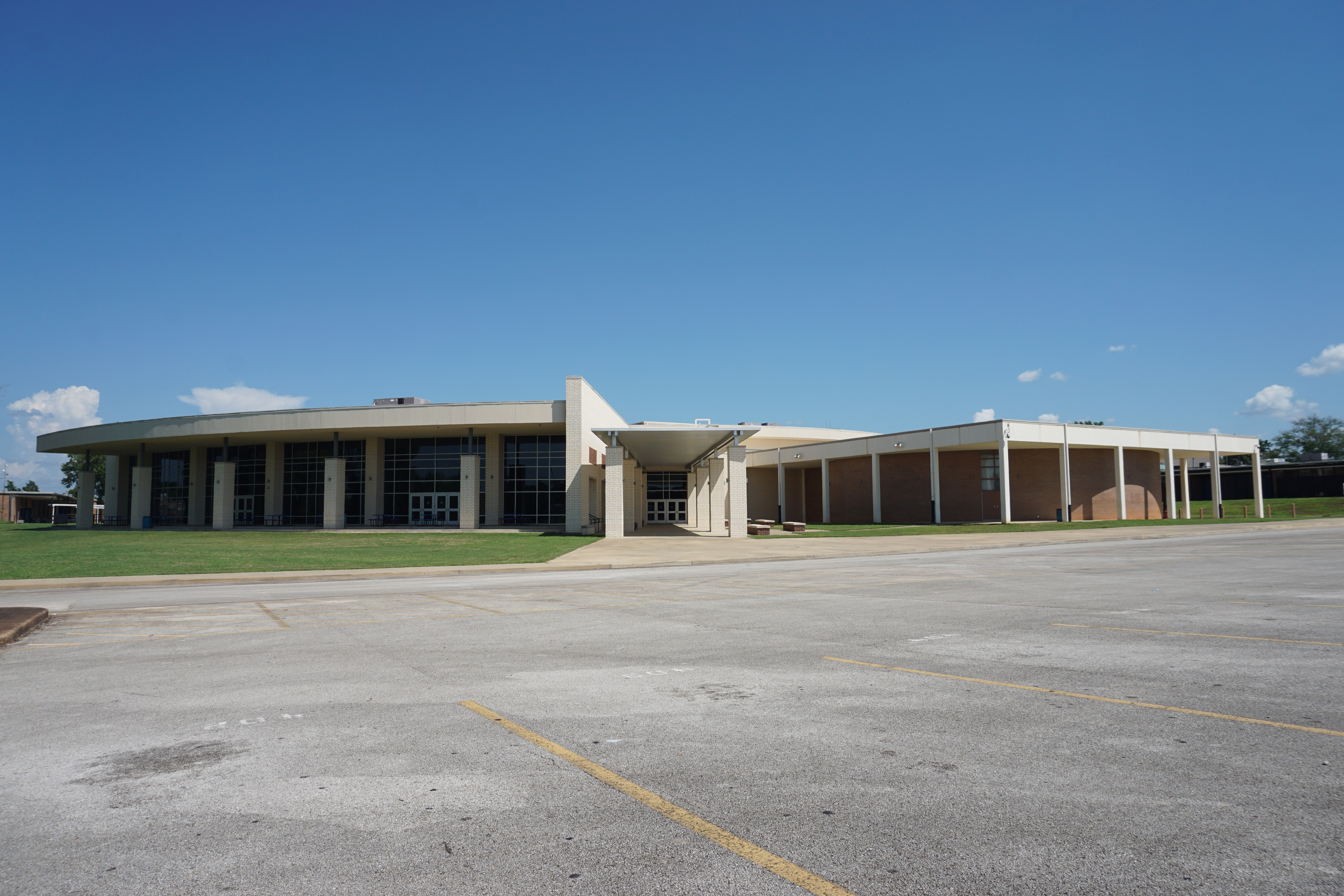

Location
- 1210 Corinth Road; Jacksonville, Texas 75766-0631; United States; 31.9533°N 95.2512°W

Information
- School type: Public high school
- School district: Jacksonville Independent School District
- Principal: Jodi Alderete
- Staff: 86.73 (FTE)
- Grades: 9-12
- Enrollment: 1,364 (2023–2024)
- Student to teacher ratio: 15.73
- Colors: Royal blue and gold
- Athletics conference: UIL District 17 Class 5A
- Mascot: Fightin' Indians/Maidens
- Website: https://jhs.jisd.org/

Jacksonville High School is a 5A public high school located in Jacksonville, Texas, United States. It is part of the Jacksonville Independent School District located in north central Cherokee County. For the 2021–22 school year, the school was given a "B" by the Texas Education Agency.

== Current ==
Jacksonville High School has recently undergone the first major construction since the late '1950s, and is now more open, to accommodate the recent switch to a 5A public high school.

== Athletics ==
The Jacksonville Indians compete in the following sports:

- Baseball
- Basketball
- Cross country
- Football
- Golf
- Powerlifting
- Soccer
- Softball
- Tennis
- Track and field
- Volleyball

=== Football ===
Jacksonville and rival Nacogdoches played in the longest high-school football game in history, a 12-overtime affair in 2010 which resulted in Jacksonville winning 84-81. Only four years later, the two played a (short, by comparison) five-overtime game, with Jacksonville again winning, this time 85-79.

=== State titles ===
- Boys' basketball
  - 1956 (2A)
- One Act Play
  - 1952 (1A), 1956 (1A), 1960 (3A)
- Honor Band (Texas Music Educators Association)
  - 1984–1985 school year (4A)

== Notable alumni ==
- Jerry Aldridge, former NFL running back
- Kevin Aldridge, former NFL defensive end
- Toby Gowin, former NFL punter
- Marshall Johnson, former NFL wide receiver
- Pete Lammons, former NFL tight end
- Margo Martindale, Emmy-winning actress of stage, TV shows, and films
- Josh McCown, NFL quarterback
- Luke McCown, former NFL quarterback
- Neal McCoy, country music singer
- Devin McCuin, college football wide receiver for the Ohio State Buckeyes
- James Noble, former NFL wide receiver
- Grady Nutt, Christian minister and humorist
- Lee Ann Womack, country music singer
- Deborah Yates, Tony Award-nominated actress and dancer
