= Josh McCown =

American football player and coach (born 1979)

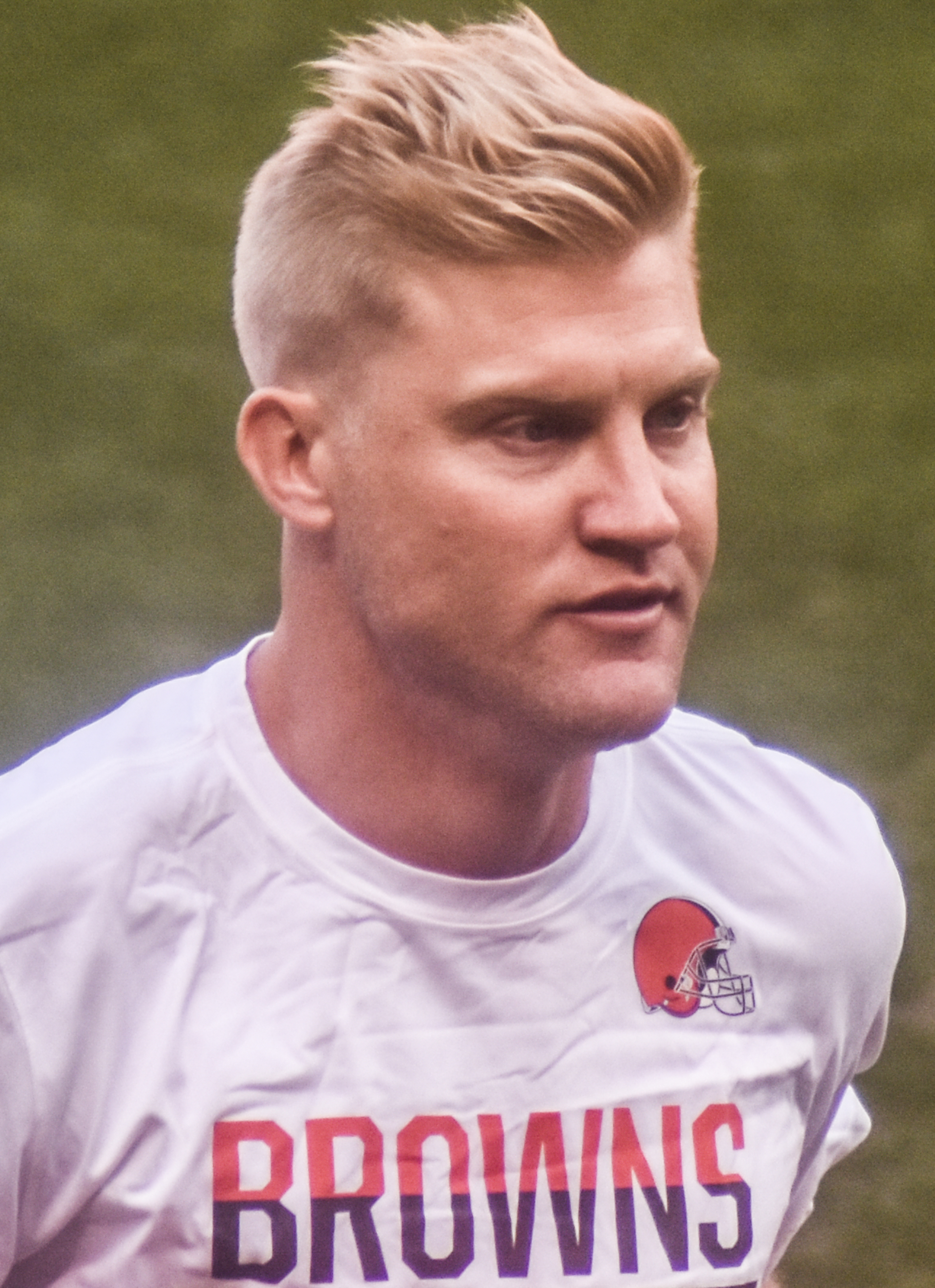
- McCown with the Cleveland Browns in 2016

Minnesota Vikings
- Title: Offensive passing game coordinator/quarterbacks coach

Personal information
- Born: July 4, 1979 (age 47); Jacksonville, Texas, U.S.
- Listed height: 6 ft 4 in (1.93 m)
- Listed weight: 218 lb (99 kg)

Career information
- Position: Quarterback (No. 12, 15, 13, 18)
- High school: Jacksonville (Texas)
- College: SMU (1998–2000); Sam Houston State (2001)
- NFL draft: 2002: 3rd round, 81st overall pick

Career history

Playing
- Arizona Cardinals (2002–2005); Detroit Lions (2006); Oakland Raiders (2007); Miami Dolphins (2008)*; Carolina Panthers (2008–2009); Hartford Colonials (2010); San Francisco 49ers (2011)*; Chicago Bears (2011–2013); Tampa Bay Buccaneers (2014); Cleveland Browns (2015–2016); New York Jets (2017–2018); Philadelphia Eagles (2019–2020); Houston Texans (2020)
- * Offseason or practice squad member only

Coaching
- Carolina Panthers (2023) Quarterbacks coach; Minnesota Vikings (2024–present); Quarterbacks coach (2024–2025); Offensive passing game coordinator/quarterbacks coach (2026–present)

Awards and highlights
- UFL passer rating leader (2010); SFL Player of the Year (2001); Third-team Division I-AA All-American (2001)

Career NFL statistics
- Passing completions: 1,584
- Passing attempts: 2,633
- Completion percentage: 60.2%
- TD–INT: 98–82
- Passing yards: 17,731
- Passer rating: 79.7
- Stats at Pro Football Reference

Joshua Treadwell McCown (born July 4, 1979) is an American professional football coach and former quarterback. He is the offensive passing game coordinator and quarterbacks coach for the Minnesota Vikings of the National Football League (NFL). McCown played three seasons of college football for the SMU Mustangs, throwing for 27 touchdowns and 34 interceptions. He then transferred to play his final season of college football for the Sam Houston State Bearkats. In his only season with the Bearkats, he threw for 3,481 yards, 32 touchdowns and 12 interceptions, earning Southland Football League Player of the Year and third-team Division I-AA All-American honors. McCown was selected by the Arizona Cardinals in the third round of the 2002 NFL draft. McCown was in the NFL for eighteen seasons and was a member of twelve different franchises. He also played one year in the United Football League (UFL).

While a backup for the majority of his NFL career, McCown re-emerged into a starting quarterback role after throwing for 1,829 yards, 13 touchdowns, and one interception with the Chicago Bears in 2013 in relief of the injured Jay Cutler. Overall, McCown was the primary starter for the Cardinals in 2004, the Oakland Raiders in 2007, the Tampa Bay Buccaneers in 2014, the Cleveland Browns in 2015, and the New York Jets in 2017. With the Jets, he set single-season career highs with 267 completions, a 67.3 completion percentage, 2,926 passing yards, 18 passing touchdowns and 5 rushing touchdowns.

After the 2018 season, McCown retired from the NFL and briefly joined ESPN as an NFL analyst. However, he came out of retirement to sign with the Philadelphia Eagles in August 2019. In the Wild Card Round of the 2019–20 NFL playoffs, McCown replaced an injured Carson Wentz and played the majority of the game at the age of 40, becoming the oldest quarterback in NFL history to make his postseason debut. In 2020 with the Eagles, McCown became the oldest practice squad player in NFL history and the first NFL player to work remotely. In 2023, he was hired by the Panthers to be their quarterbacks coach under head coach Frank Reich. McCown was fired by the Panthers after a 1–10 start to the season. He became the Vikings' quarterbacks coach in 2024.

== Early life ==
Joshua Treadwell McCown was born on July 4, 1979, in Jacksonville, Texas. He grew up on the family's ranch and attended Jacksonville High School. He had a significant growth spurt in high school that helped his football career. McCown later said, "My first driver's license said 5-foot-4. At 16, I was 5–4." A coach of McCown's also said, "We knew Josh was going to be a good football player if he ever grew. But it sure took awhile. He really started shooting up in the second half of his junior year." In McCown's senior year in 1997, he led the team to the playoffs and was the East Texas Player of the Year, District 17-4A Offensive Player of the Year, and an All-State honorable mention. He also played basketball and won All-District second-team honors as a shooting guard his senior year. The Jacksonville Chamber of Commerce inducted him into their Wall of Fame in 2013.

== College career ==
=== SMU ===
McCown played college football for the SMU Mustangs of Southern Methodist University from 1998 to 2000, passing for 4,022 yards and 27 touchdowns, but also threw 34 interceptions. He started 25 total games for the Mustangs. He played in 9 games, starting 5, for the Mustangs his freshman season in 1998, completing 46 of 99 passes for 619 yards and 7 touchdowns with 8 interceptions. McCown split time with sophomore Chris Sanders in 1998. McCown was the first freshman to start at quarterback for the team since 1989. He started all 10 games for the Mustangs in 1999, completing 125 of 234 passes for 1,434 yards and 11 touchdowns with 10 interceptions. He set a school record for consecutive completions when he completed 19 passes in a row against Tulsa in 1999. McCown started 9 games for the Mustangs his junior year in 2000, completing 169 of 331 passes for 1,969 yards and 9 touchdowns with 16 interceptions. He threw for 420 yards against Texas-El Paso in 2000, which was the third-highest total in SMU history. He started the first six games of the 2000 season before being replaced by David Page for three games. McCown then started the final three games for the Mustangs.

=== Sam Houston State ===
McCown transferred his senior year to play for the Sam Houston State Bearkats of Sam Houston State University. He transferred to be in an offense that threw more and to have a better chance to win. He also did not have to sit out the 2001 season because Sam Houston State was in Division I-AA. McCown surpassed his three-year SMU touchdown total in just one season for the Bearkats, completing 259 of 429 passes for 3,481 yards and 32 touchdowns with 12 interceptions as a senior in 2001. The Bearkats finished the season with a 10–3 record and were Southland Football League co-champions with McNeese State. Sam Houston State defeated Northern Arizona in the first round of the Division I-AA national playoffs to reach the I-AA quarterfinals, where the Bearkats lost to eventual national champion Montana. He set single-season school records in pass completions, attempts, yards, and touchdowns. McCown's 3,481 passing yards ranked eighth on the school's career list. He also rushed for 351 yards and 6 touchdowns on 112 attempts. He threw for 404 yards and tied a school single-game record with 5 touchdowns against Western Illinois in 2001. McCown was named the SFL Player of the Year and earned first-team All-SFL honors in 2001. He was also named a third-team Division I-AA All-American by The Sports Network. Following his senior season, he was one of 16 players considered for the Walter Payton Award, given to the top performer in NCAA Division I-AA football. McCown finished seventh in the Walter Payton Award voting. He replaced Joey Harrington on the 2002 Senior Bowl roster after Harrington suffered a knee injury in the East–West Shrine Game. McCown played in the Senior Bowl and had a "strong game", completing 7 of 11 passes for 117 yards while also rushing for a 12-yard touchdown. He majored in history at Sam Houston State. McCown was inducted into the Sam Houston Athletic Hall of Honor in 2013.

== Professional career ==
Pre-draft measurables
Height	Weight	Arm length	Hand span	40-yard dash	10-yard split	20-yard split	20-yard shuttle	Three-cone drill	Vertical jump	Broad jump	Wonderlic
6 ft 3 7/8 in (1.93 m)	(Note: The exact Wt, 40-yd dash, 10-yd split and 20-yd split values have been excluded because different sources have different numbers.)	30 1/2 in (0.77 m)	9 in (0.23 m)	s	s	s	3.90 s	6.85 s	38.5 in (0.98 m)	10 ft 0 in (3.05 m)	30
All values from 2002 NFL Scouting Combine. See note for missing values

=== Arizona Cardinals ===
==== 2002 ====
McCown had an impressive performance at the NFL Combine, which saw him post a 40-yard dash in the mid-4-second range, a 10-foot long jump, and a 38 1/2-inch vertical jump. One scout who attended the combine said, "He could be the third quarterback taken or the eighth quarterback." McCown was rated the sixth-best quarterback in the 2002 NFL draft by NFLDraftScout.com. He was selected by the Arizona Cardinals in the third round of the 2002 NFL draft, with the 81st overall pick, and was the fourth quarterback to be drafted. Dave McGinnis, the head coach of the Cardinals when McCown was drafted, later stated, "[McCown] had all the background essentials you really liked. And he's a fabulous athlete. If you were going to start a pickup basketball game in the building, he'd be one of your first choices." McCown played for the Cardinals from 2002 to 2005.

Entering his rookie season, McCown became the team's second-string quarterback after former Cardinals backup Chris Greisen was released in August. McCown made his NFL debut on December 1 against the Kansas City Chiefs, relieving starter Jake Plummer late in the third quarter of an eventual 49–0 loss. McCown played in 2 games in 2002, completing 7 of 18 passes for 66 yards with 2 interceptions. He also rushed once for 20 yards.

==== 2003 ====
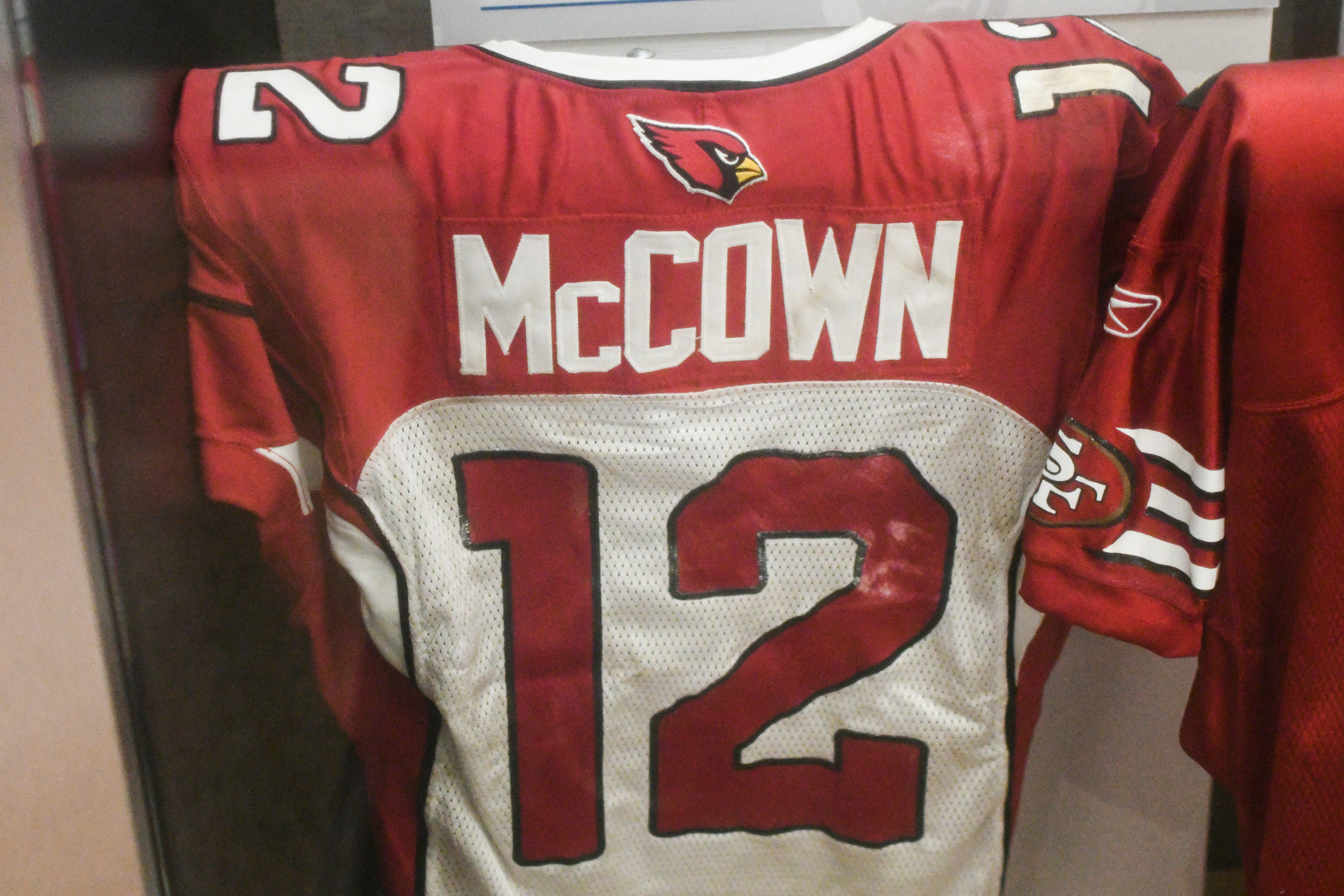
The Arizona Cardinals jersey that McCown wore during the first NFL regular season game outside the U.S., displayed at the Pro Football Hall of Fame

In 2003, McCown was the backup to Jeff Blake for the first 13 games of the season. On September 14 against the Seattle Seahawks, McCown completed 18 of 32 passes for 150 yards with 2 interceptions after relieving the injured Blake late in the first quarter of an eventual 38–0 loss. Prior to the game against the San Francisco 49ers on December 7, it was reported that the Cardinals would play both starter Blake and McCown in the game. Blake played the first half, completing 8 of 20 passes for 59 yards and 1 interception. McCown played the second half, completing 11 of 20 passes for 120 yards and 2 touchdowns as the Cardinals lost by a score of 50–14.

McCown was then promoted to starter and started the final three games of the season. Head coach Dave McGinnis stated, "Josh is the right decision professionally for our organization," and "Some quality time is what he needs against good teams ... and it's important to find out what we have there." In the final game of the season on December 28 against the Minnesota Vikings, McCown threw a game-winning 28-yard touchdown pass to wide receiver Nate Poole as time expired to beat the Vikings by a score of 18–17. The Vikings would have made the playoffs if they had won the game, but the Green Bay Packers made the playoffs in their place. The Packers also invited McCown and Poole to attend their first playoff game. While McCown declined the invitation due to the birth of his third child, Poole attended the game and was presented with a key to the city. McCown played in 8 games, with 3 starts, in 2003 and completed 95 of 166 passes for 1,018 yards and five touchdowns with six interceptions. He also rushed for a career-high 158 yards and a touchdown on 28 carries.

==== 2004 ====
On February 4, 2004, new head coach Dennis Green named McCown the team's starter for the 2004 season. McCown started the first nine games of the season for the Cardinals, leading the team to a 4–5 record. Against the Atlanta Falcons on September 26, he completed 20 of 26 passes for a then career-high completion percentage of 76.9 percent. However, he also lost three fumbles and was benched in favor of Shaun King in the fourth quarter as the Cardinals lost by a score of 6–3. McCown threw for a then career-high three touchdowns on October 10 against the 49ers. During McCown's ninth consecutive start on November 14 against the New York Giants, he completed 12 of 24 passes for only 90 yards, though the Cardinals won the game by a score of 17–14.

McCown was then benched, with King replacing him as the team's starting quarterback. King then started the next two games for the Cardinals while McCown was second-string. After King's two starts, he was benched in favor of John Navarre. Navarre then started one game for the team, during which McCown was second-string and King was third-string. After Navarre's one start, he was benched in favor of McCown, who then started the final four games of the season. McCown threw for 307 yards against the 49ers on December 12, which was his first career 300-yard game. He also threw three touchdowns against the Seahawks on December 26, his second three-passing-touchdown game of the year. McCown played in 14 games, starting 13, in 2004 and completed 233 of 408 passes for 2,511 yards and 11 touchdowns with 10 interceptions. He also rushed for 112 yards and 2 touchdowns on 36 carries. The Cardinals finished the year third in the NFC West with a 6–10 record and were 6–7 in games that McCown started.

==== 2005 ====
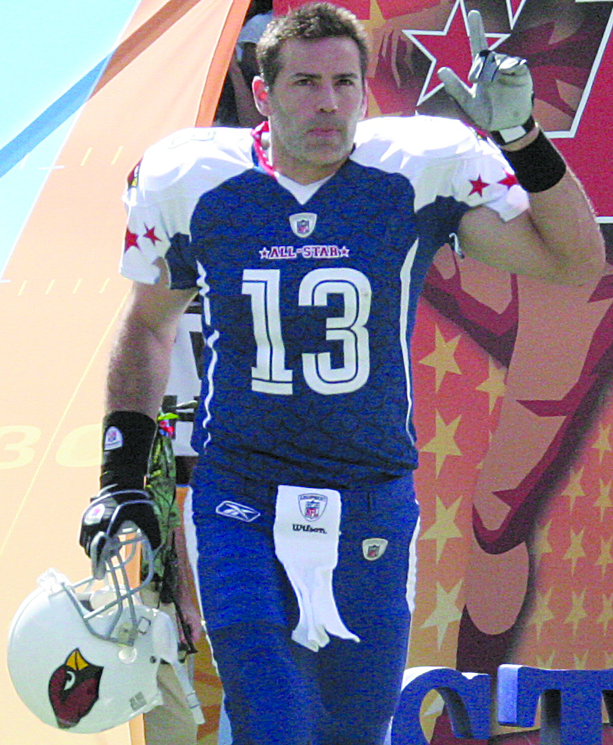
Kurt Warner (pictured) split time with McCown in 2005

In March 2005, the Cardinals signed quarterback Kurt Warner. Later the same month, McCown also signed a one-year contract extension with the team. In May 2005, coach Green officially named Warner the team's starter and McCown the second-stringer for the 2005 season. Warner started the first three games of the season. In the third game against the Seattle Seahawks on September 25, 2005, Warner suffered an injury late in the second quarter and was relieved by McCown. McCown then started the next four games for the Cardinals. During the first game of that stretch, he started for the Cardinals at the first NFL regular season game outside the United States, played at Estadio Azteca on October 2, 2005, against the 49ers. He completed 32 of 46 passes for a then-career-high 385 yards and 2 touchdowns as the Cardinals won by a score of 31–14. The game in Mexico City had an attendance of 103,467, setting a record for the largest attendance for a regular-season game in NFL history. The record has since been broken, but is still second place all-time. The jersey that McCown wore during the Mexico game was later displayed at the Pro Football Hall of Fame.

McCown's next start was against the Carolina Panthers on October 9, in which he completed 29 of 36 passes for a new career high of 398 yards with 2 touchdowns and 3 interceptions as the Cardinals lost by a score of 24–20. His two 300-yard games were two of the four highest passing totals of any player during the 2005 season. McCown also became the first Cardinals quarterback to throw for 350 yards in back-to-back games. Warner then returned from injury, but was McCown's backup for the next two games. McCown played poorly, though, and Warner was promoted to starter again. Warner then started the next seven games. In Warner's seventh start back against the Houston Texans on December 18, he suffered an injury early in the first quarter and stayed in the game for two more series before being relieved by McCown. However, McCown also ended up leaving the game with flu-like symptoms at halftime and was replaced by Navarre. McCown then started the final two games of the season. He played in 9 games, starting 6, in 2005 and completed 163 of 279 passes for 1,836 yards and 9 touchdowns with 11 interceptions. He also rushed 29 times for 139 yards. The Cardinals finished the year third in the NFC West with a 5–11 record and were 3–3 in games that McCown started. The Cardinals led the league in passing offense in 2005 with 4,437 yards, with Warner throwing for 2,713 yards, McCown throwing for 1,836 yards and Navarre throwing for 174 yards.

McCown became a free agent after the 2005 season. He played in 33 games, starting 22, during his tenure with the team, and completed 498 of 862 passes for 5,431 yards and 25 touchdowns with 29 interceptions. He also rushed 94 times for 429 yards and 3 touchdowns. The Cardinals were 10–12 in games that McCown started.

=== Detroit Lions ===
In March 2006, McCown signed a two-year contract worth $6 million with the Detroit Lions, believing he would have the chance to start. In July, however, Jon Kitna was named the starter entering training camp, and McCown was named the backup. McCown was Kitna's backup for all 16 games in 2006. During the season, McCown began running wide receiver routes during practice and became skilled at it. He lined up at wide receiver for one play against the Cardinals on November 19. He saw extended time at wide receiver during the game against the New England Patriots on December 3. McCown was inserted into the game as the third wide receiver and was targeted twice, catching both passes for a total of 15 yards. He also had a 31-yard reception, but it was brought back after McCown was called for offensive pass interference. In reference to playing wide receiver, McCown later said, "It was a surreal moment and it changed my whole perception and respect for receivers."

After the 2006 season, McCown asked to be traded. His agent, Michael McCartney, said, "Josh sees himself as a starting quarterback, and I agree with him." On April 28, 2007, the Lions selected quarterback Drew Stanton in the 2007 NFL draft. Later the same day, McCown and wide receiver Mike Williams were traded to the Oakland Raiders in exchange for a 2007 fourth-round draft pick, which the Lions used to select cornerback A. J. Davis.

=== Oakland Raiders ===
McCown was involved in a quarterback competition with Daunte Culpepper and Andrew Walter to see who would be the Raiders' starter for the 2007 season. On August 27, head coach Lane Kiffin narrowed the choices down to McCown or Culpepper. On September 5, a day after Kiffin had informed the quarterbacks, Kiffin privately informed the team that McCown would be the starter. However, he did not publicly name the starter until the day of the Week 1 game against the Lions on September 9, explaining, "It's simply a matter of always trying to gain a competitive advantage."

In Week 1, McCown threw for 313 yards with 2 touchdowns and 2 interceptions in a 36–21 loss. He also fumbled late in the game to end the Raiders' attempt at a comeback. McCown sprained his right foot in the first half of the Lions game and injured his right index finger on the final play of the game. By game time of the Week 2 contest against the Denver Broncos, even though McCown was still nursing the finger injury, Kiffin felt McCown's foot had healed enough for him to play. McCown started the game, throwing for 73 yards, 1 touchdown, and 3 interceptions. McCown then started the next game against the Miami Dolphins, but after suffering a left foot injury, he was relieved by Culpepper to start the second half. Culpepper then started the team's next four games in place of McCown. During the fourth game of that stretch against the Tennessee Titans, even though he was not 100% healed, McCown served as Culpepper's backup. A few days after the Titans game, McCown was named the starter, with Kiffin stating, "I felt Daunte played really well for us, but with Josh coming back and looking healthy again, we're going to go back to Josh." McCown then started the next two games. Due to McCown's poor play, however, Culpepper was named the starter for the following game against the Vikings. McCown also had a bruised thigh at the time of his benching, but that reportedly may not have been a major factor in the decision to start Culpepper, with Kiffin stating, "I felt it was time to go with Daunte and see if he can give us a little spark," and "It's nothing against Josh." McCown ended up being inactive for the Vikings game due to his injury. Culpepper then started the next game against the Chiefs, but suffered a sore quadriceps during the game that intensified later in the week. Due to his injury, Culpepper did not play in another game that season. McCown started the next game against the Broncos. During the game, McCown threw for 141 yards, 3 touchdowns, no interceptions, and a then career-high 125.2 passer rating as the Raiders beat the Broncos by a score of 34–20. McCown then started the next three games, but number-one overall draft pick JaMarcus Russell played the majority of McCown's third start. Russell also started the final game of the season.

McCown played in 9 games, all starts, in 2007, and completed 111 of 190 passes for 1,151 yards and 10 touchdowns with 11 interceptions, while also rushing for 143 yards. The Raiders finished the year with a 4–12 record and were 2–7 in games that McCown started. In 2007, he was the final winner of the NFL Quarterback Challenge. He became a free agent on February 29, 2008.

=== Miami Dolphins ===
On February 29, 2008, McCown signed a two-year contract worth $6.25 million with the Dolphins. A chance to compete for the starting job factored into his decision to sign with Miami. Prior to training camp in July, McCown needed six stitches in his throwing hand's index finger. He was holding firewood and his brother Luke accidentally grazed Josh's finger with a chainsaw.

On August 4, 2008, the Dolphins released their first depth chart of the season and had McCown listed as the starter over John Beck and Chad Henne. However, head coach Tony Sparano said that Beck and Henne had not been ruled out as potential starters for the team's first preseason game on August 9. Free agent quarterback Chad Pennington signed with the Dolphins on August 8 and was expected to be the team's starter. McCown played in the team's first preseason game on August 9 but not until the fourth quarter of the contest. He then failed to appear in the team's final three preseason games. Pennington was officially named the team's starter on August 25, before the team's last preseason game on August 28.

=== Carolina Panthers ===
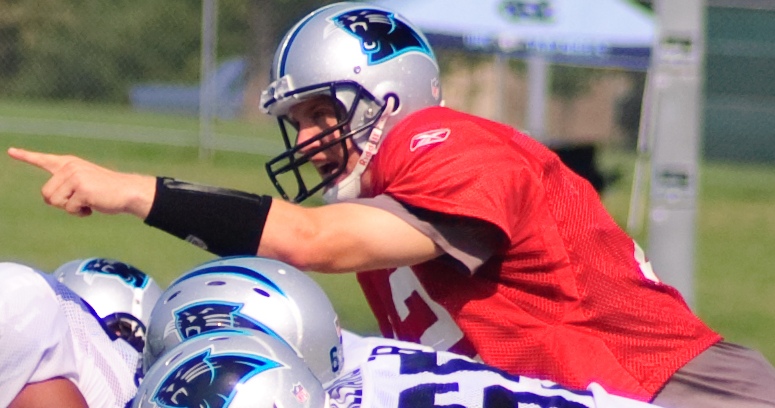
McCown practicing with the Carolina Panthers in 2009

On August 29, 2008, before the start of the regular season, the Panthers acquired McCown from the Dolphins for a seventh-round pick (#237 overall) in the 2009 NFL draft. The move came a day after Panthers quarterback Matt Moore suffered a leg injury. However, general manager Marty Hurney said that the trade for McCown was not in response to Moore's injury, with Hurney stating, "Josh is a guy that we've liked for the last several years when he was in unrestricted free agency." McCown was the backup to Jake Delhomme for all 16 games in 2008. He was also the backup for the team's National Football Conference (NFC) Divisional Round loss to the Cardinals. He played in two games in 2008. He relieved Delhomme late in the fourth quarter of a 24–9 win against the Falcons, but the only statistics he recorded were three end-of-game kneeldowns. He also relieved Delhomme early in the fourth quarter of a 34–0 win against the Chiefs, but he only recorded one end-of-game kneeldown.

McCown beat out Moore for the primary backup quarterback job in 2009. In Week 1 against the Philadelphia Eagles on September 13, McCown entered the game late in the third quarter in relief of Delhomme, who had committed five turnovers. McCown completed 1 of 6 passes for 2 yards before spraining both his left knee and left foot on the same play early in the fourth quarter. McCown was then relieved by Moore as the Panthers lost to the Eagles by a score of 38–10. McCown was placed on injured reserve on September 14, ending his season. He became a free agent in March 2010.

=== Hartford Colonials ===
McCown was signed by the Hartford Colonials of the United Football League (UFL) on August 3, 2010. He received an offer from the Chicago Bears shortly after signing with the Colonials, but decided to stay with the Colonials due to wanting to honor his contract and to receive more playing time. Regarding honoring his contract, McCown later said, "It just didn't sit well with me" and that he felt it would be a bad example to his kids to say, "Give your word to somebody until something better comes along and then break that." In 2011, McCown said, "I think I'm further along now than I would have been if I would have just sat on an (NFL) roster last year and been a backup because I played eight games," and "I think you're only getting better when you're taking reps, so I really valued that." McCown threw for 265 yards and 3 touchdowns in the season-opening 27–10 victory over the Sacramento Mountain Lions. He was named the UFL Offensive Player of the Week for Week 1. In Week 2, he completed 22 of 25 passes for 264 yards and 2 touchdowns. In Week 4, he threw for 223 yards, with 1 touchdown and 1 interception. McCown passed for 1,463 yards and 10 touchdowns with 8 interceptions in 8 games during the 2010 season. His 79.3 passer rating was the highest in the UFL in 2010. The Colonials finished the year with a 3–5 record. He was a team captain while with the Colonials.

=== San Francisco 49ers ===
On August 17, 2011, McCown signed a one-year contract for the minimum of $810,000 with the 49ers. He was expected to be the team's third-string quarterback behind starter Alex Smith and rookie Colin Kaepernick but was released by the 49ers on September 3, 2011. 49ers head coach John Harbaugh said the team only had room for two quarterbacks on the 53-man roster due to impressive preseason performances by undrafted rookie defensive linemen Demarcus Dobbs and Ian Williams. However, the 49ers ended up claiming rookie quarterback Scott Tolzien off waivers the following day.

=== Chicago Bears ===
==== 2011 ====
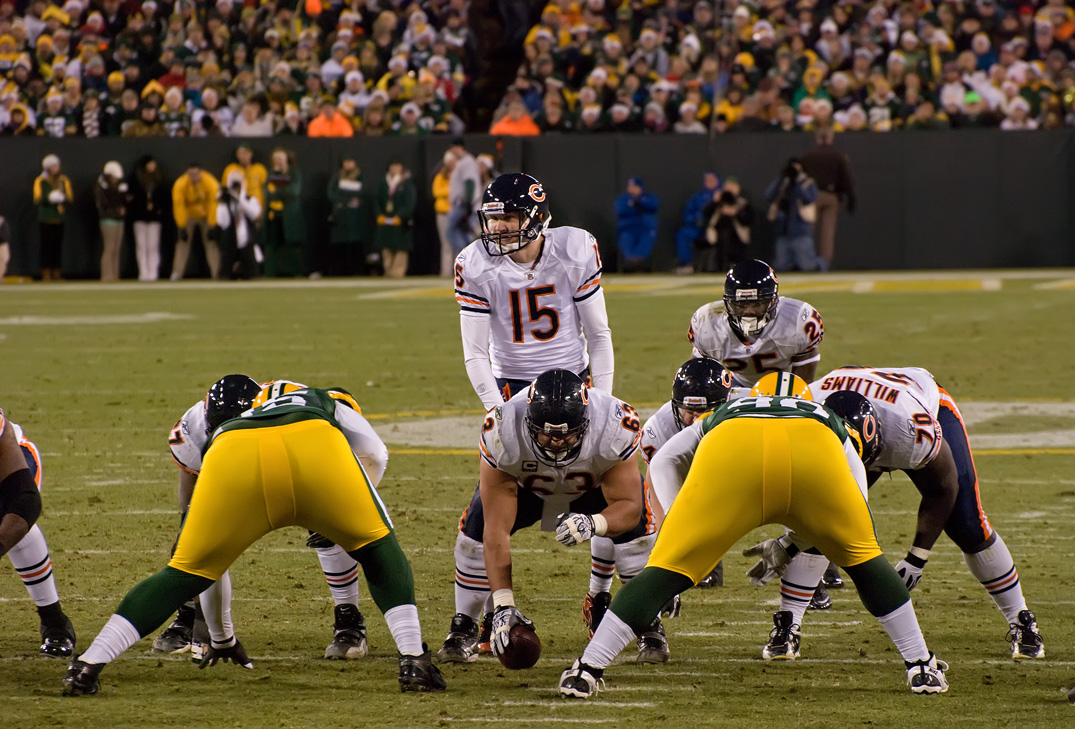
McCown (15) lines up against the Green Bay Packers in 2011

On November 23, 2011, McCown signed with the Bears, as a backup to Caleb Hanie, after an injury to starting quarterback Jay Cutler. On December 18, 2011, McCown came in for Hanie with five minutes left in the fourth quarter of a 38–14 loss to the Seahawks at Soldier Field. McCown threw twice, one for a 12-yard gain, and the other was intercepted. On December 21, 2011, the Bears announced that McCown would start on the Christmas Day game against the defending champion Packers, due to Hanie's struggles since taking over for the injured Cutler. McCown completed 19 of 28 passes for 242 yards with a touchdown and 2 interceptions in the 35–21 loss. In Week 17 against the Vikings, McCown completed 15 of 20 passes for 160 yards, 1 touchdown and 1 interception for a 75.4 passer rating, but was sacked seven times. The Bears won 17–13.

==== 2012 ====
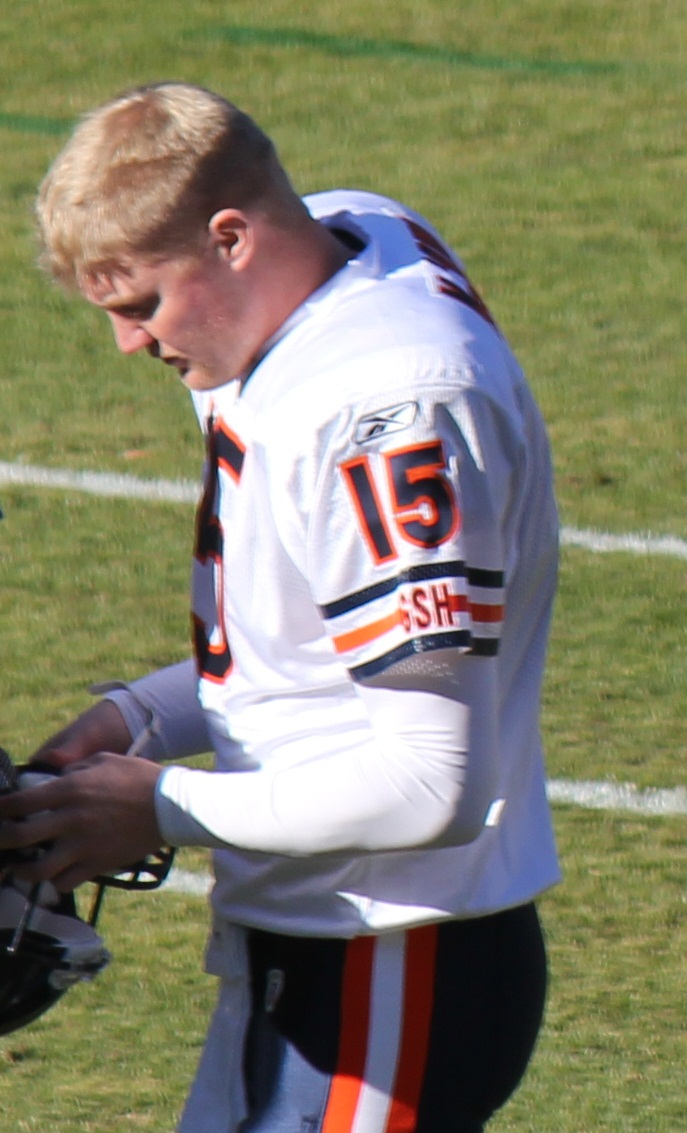
McCown with the Chicago Bears in 2011

On March 14, 2012, McCown was signed to a one-year deal by the Bears. He switched back to his old jersey number of 12 due to Brandon Marshall already having No. 15. On August 31, McCown was waived by Chicago, cementing Jason Campbell as Cutler's backup. On November 12, McCown was again re-signed by the Bears after Cutler sustained a concussion. McCown then was Campbell's backup for the game against the 49ers on November 19. Cutler then returned from injury and McCown was inactive as the third-string quarterback for the final six games of the season.

==== 2013 ====
McCown became an unrestricted free agent after the 2012 season, and on March 29, 2013, signed a one-year deal with the Bears after former backup Jason Campbell left the team to sign a two-year contract with the Cleveland Browns. In Week 7 against the Washington Redskins, McCown entered the game in the second quarter after Cutler suffered a groin injury. McCown completed 14 of 20 passes for 204 yards and a touchdown to Martellus Bennett, but the Bears lost 45–41. On November 4, McCown, starting in place of the injured Cutler, led the Bears to a victory over the rival Packers on Monday Night Football. McCown threw for 272 yards and two touchdowns en route to a 27–20 victory. Cutler started the Week 10 game against the Detroit Lions and suffered an ankle injury in the second quarter but stayed in the game. However, with Cutler's ankle potentially limiting his mobility for the two-minute drill, he was replaced by McCown for the final drive. McCown then guided the Bears to a 74-yard touchdown drive, completing 6 of 9 passes for 62 yards and an 11-yard touchdown to Brandon Marshall. However, the Bears lost 21–19. McCown started his second game against the Ravens, completing 19 of 31 passes for 216 yards with 1 touchdown and a 92.9 passer rating in a 23–20 victory, In the last four games, McCown had thrown for 754 yards, 5 touchdowns, no interceptions and a 100.0 passer rating. McCown started Week 12 against the St. Louis Rams and completed a franchise-record 36 passes for 352 yards, 2 touchdowns and an interception. The next week against the Vikings, McCown threw for a season-high 355 yards, completing 23 of 36 passes for 2 touchdowns and a 114.9 rating. In Week 14 against the Cowboys, McCown threw for a career-high 4 touchdowns and ran for another while completing 27 of 36 passes for 348 yards and a career-high 141.9 passer rating en route to a 45–28 victory. McCown became the first Bears quarterback to score five touchdowns in a game since Jack Concannon in 1970. McCown was named NFC Offensive Player of the Week. He was also the first Bears quarterback to throw for 300 yards in three straight games. Cutler then returned from injury to start the final three games of the season.

McCown ended the 2013 season completing 66.5 percent of his passes for 1,829 yards with 13 touchdowns, 1 interception, and a 109.0 passer rating, the third-highest behind Peyton Manning and Nick Foles and the best in Bears history. His interception percentage of 0.4% tied Damon Huard (2006) for the all-time NFL single-season record. The combination of McCown and Cutler set Bears records with 32 touchdown passes, 4,450 yards, a 64.4 completion percentage and a 96.9 passer rating. The Bears finished the season with an 8–8 record and were 3–2 in games that McCown started. On January 24, 2014, McCown was named to the USA Today All-Joe Team. He was awarded the Brian Piccolo Award by the Bears in May 2014. McCown ended his time with the Bears as the franchise's all-time career passer rating leader (101.0).

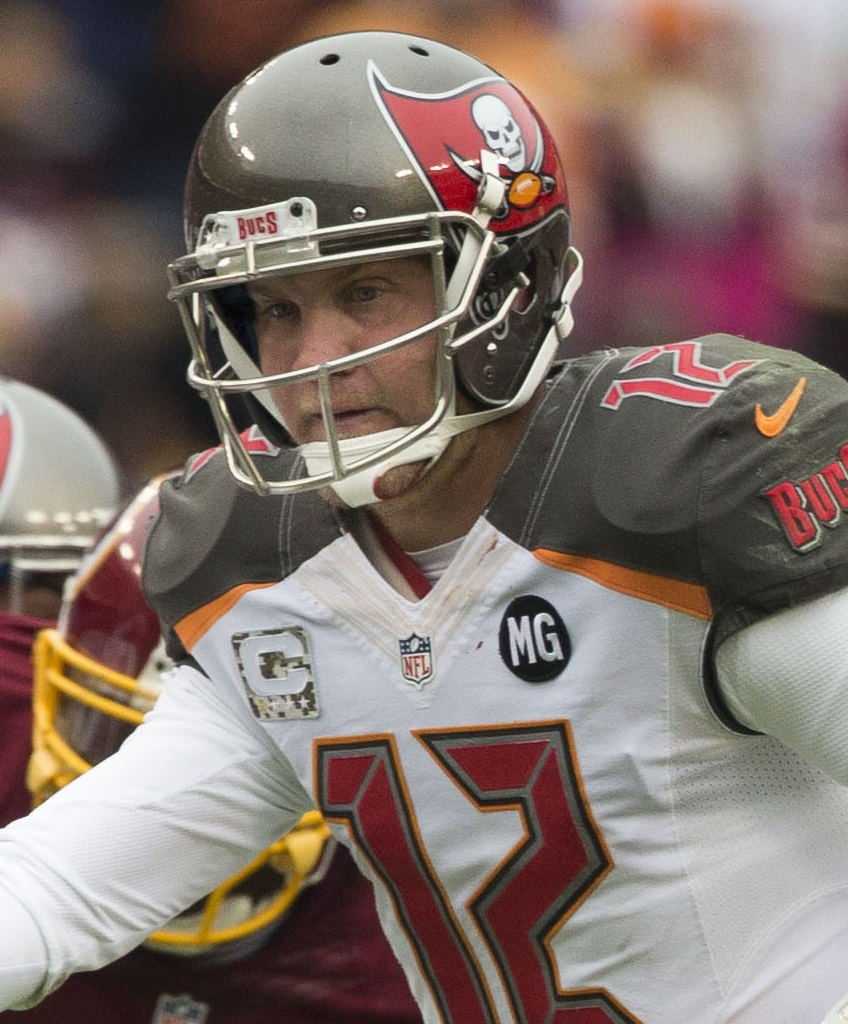
McCown with the Tampa Bay Buccaneers in 2014

=== Tampa Bay Buccaneers ===
On March 12, 2014, McCown signed a two-year, $10 million contract with the Tampa Bay Buccaneers. Another $5 million was available based on playoff appearances and playing time. He was immediately named the starter by new Buccaneers head coach and his former head coach in Chicago, Lovie Smith. Before the start of the regular season, offensive coordinator Jeff Tedford left the team due to medical issues. The Buccaneers' quarterbacks coach, first-year NFL assistant coach Marcus Arroyo, had to take over the offensive coordinator duties. In Week 3 against the Falcons, McCown tore a thumb ligament late in the second quarter and was replaced by Mike Glennon. Glennon took over as the starter in Week 4, leading the Buccaneers to a 27–24 win over the Pittsburgh Steelers but lost the next four games. McCown then returned from injury and started the final eight games of the season. In Week 12, he threw for a season-high 341 yards against his former team, the Chicago Bears, but also turned the ball over three times as the Buccaneers lost by a score of 21–13. Through Week 15, McCown had the third-most turnovers in the NFL (16) behind Geno Smith and Blake Bortles. Overall in 2014, McCown threw for 2,206 yards, 11 touchdowns, and 14 interceptions while also rushing for 127 yards and 3 touchdowns in 11 games (all starts). He committed a career-high 18 turnovers. The Buccaneers finished the year with a 2–14 record and were 1–10 in games that McCown started. McCown was a team captain while with the Buccaneers. On February 11, 2015, after underperforming, he was released after just one season in Tampa Bay.

=== Cleveland Browns ===
==== 2015 ====
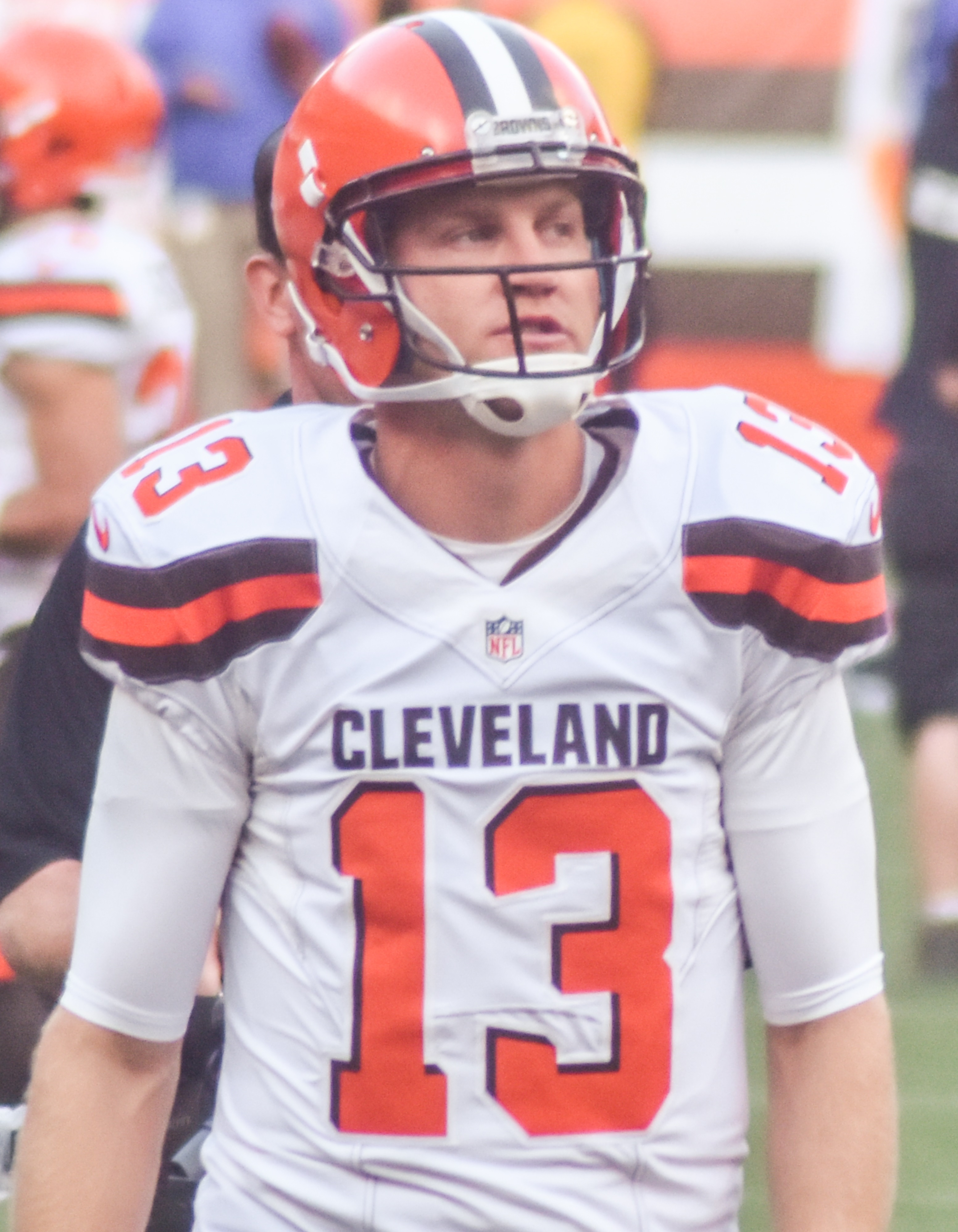
McCown with the Browns in 2015

On February 27, 2015, McCown signed a three-year contract worth $14 million with the Cleveland Browns. In May 2015, head coach Mike Pettine said that McCown was No. 1 on the depth chart at quarterback.

McCown started the Week 1 game against the New York Jets. At the end of his first drive, he made a 13-yard run and tried to jump into the endzone, but he fumbled inches away from the goal line and was taken out of the game due to a concussion. McCown returned from his injury in a Week 3 game against the Raiders on September 27, where he threw for 341 yards, 2 touchdowns, and 1 interception as the Browns lost by a score of 27–20. His brother Luke also started for the New Orleans Saints the same day, marking the first time both McCown brothers had started on the same day since December 9, 2007. Josh then threw for 356 yards and 2 touchdowns against the San Diego Chargers but the Browns lost by a score of 30–27. In a 33–30 overtime victory over the Baltimore Ravens in Week 5, he set a new career high and the Browns record for passing yards in a regular season game with 457 as the Browns moved to 2–3 while McCown was named the American Football Conference (AFC) Offensive Player of the Week. This was the Browns' first victory in Baltimore since the 2007 season. McCown also became the first player in NFL history to record more than 450 passing yards, 2 passing touchdowns, a rushing touchdown, and no interceptions in one game. He was also the first player in Browns history to pass for more than 300 yards in three straight games and his 1,154 yards set a record for most in a three-game span in franchise history, surpassing the former record of 1,038 set by Brian Sipe in 1980. The jerseys that McCown and teammate Gary Barnidge wore during the Week 5 Ravens game were sent to, and displayed, at the Pro Football Hall of Fame.

McCown then started the next three games of the season. During the second game of that stretch against the Rams, McCown hurt his ribs on a hard hit but stayed in the game for three more plays before suffering a shoulder injury and leaving the game with 5:17 left in the fourth quarter. On October 30, prior to the game against the Cardinals on November 1, McCown was listed as questionable with shoulder and rib injuries. He ended up starting the game, passing for 211 yards and a season-high 3 touchdowns, which all came in the first half, as the Browns lost by a score of 34–20. McCown also took several hard hits early in the third quarter, exacerbating his rib injury from the previous week. However, he stayed in the game until leaving late in the fourth quarter. Due to McCown's injury, Johnny Manziel started the next two games. On November 17, Manziel, coming off a 372-yard performance against the Steelers, was named the starter for the rest of the season, but McCown was promoted to starter again after a video surfaced online of Manziel partying. In the ensuing Week 12 rematch against the Ravens on December 1, McCown broke his collarbone late in the third quarter and stayed in for two plays before leaving the game. On December 2, it was announced that McCown would miss the rest of the season with the injury. He was placed on injured reserve the same day. He threw for 2,109 yards, 12 touchdowns, and 4 interceptions while also rushing for 98 yards and 1 touchdown in a team-high 8 starts during the 2015 season. The Browns finished the year with a 3–13 record and were 1–7 in games that McCown started despite him posting a passer rating of 93.3 on the season (although he also lost a career-high six fumbles). He was the Browns nominee for the Art Rooney Sportsmanship Award in 2015. The local chapter of the Pro Football Writers of America named McCown its Dino Lucarelli "Good Guy" Award winner.

==== 2016 ====
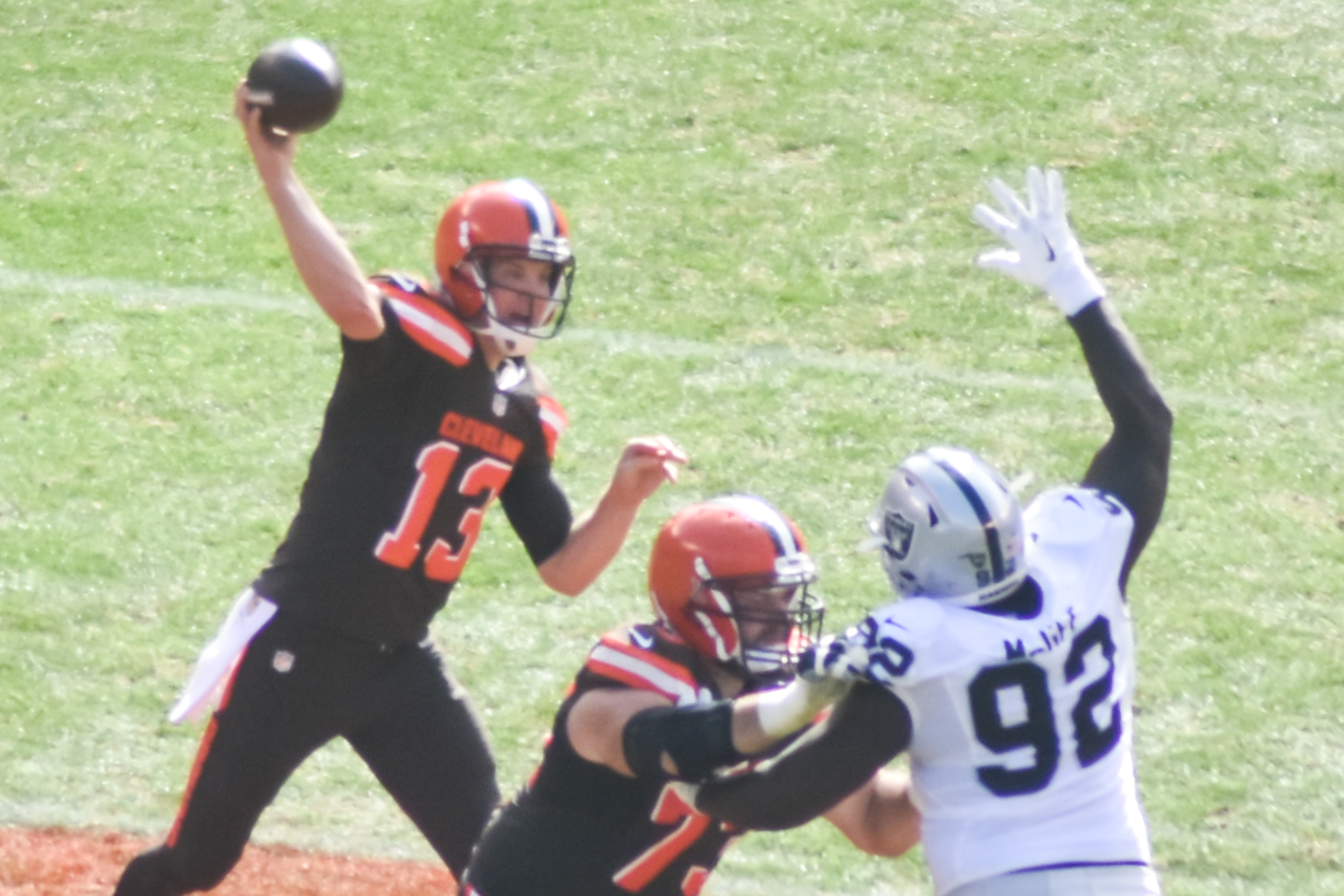
McCown attempting a pass in 2015

Robert Griffin III signed with the Browns in March 2016 and was expected to be the team's starter. On August 8, 2016, head coach Hue Jackson officially named Griffin the starter for the 2016 season.

A day after the Browns' Week 1 game, the team announced that Griffin would miss at least eight games due to an injury he suffered during the contest. McCown then started the Week 2 game against the Ravens, throwing for 260 yards and 2 touchdowns with 2 interceptions in the 25–20 loss. McCown also fractured his left collarbone in the Ravens game but played through the entire game. He returned from his injury on October 30, throwing for 341 yards and 2 touchdowns with 2 interceptions as the Browns lost 31–28 to the Jets. He threw for 228 yards in the first half, which was the most by a Browns quarterback in the first half since 1986. On November 1, McCown and Cody Kessler, who had started in place of McCown and was returning from injury, were listed as co-starters on the Browns unofficial depth chart. On November 4, Kessler was named the Browns' starter for the next game, with Jackson saying "I need to know" if he's the Browns quarterback of the future. On November 10 against the Ravens, McCown threw for 59 yards with no touchdowns and 2 interceptions after entering the game early in the third quarter due to Kessler being benched. On November 20 against the Steelers, he threw for 188 yards and 1 touchdown in relief of an injured Kessler. On November 27 against the Giants, he started due to Kessler's injury and threw for 322 yards and 1 touchdown. Griffin then returned from his injury to start the final four games of the season while McCown was inactive as the third-string quarterback for the final four games. McCown played in 5 games, starting 3, during the 2016 season and completed 90 of 165 passes for 1,100 yards with 6 touchdowns and 6 interceptions. On February 7, 2017, McCown was released by the Browns.

=== New York Jets ===
==== 2017 ====
On March 20, 2017, McCown signed a one-year, $6 million contract with the Jets. On August 28, 2017, after battling Christian Hackenberg and Bryce Petty, McCown was named the starting quarterback to begin the 2017 season. McCown won three straight starts from Week 3 to Week 5; the first time in McCown's NFL career that he won three straight starts. During Week 7 against the Dolphins, he threw for 209 yards, 3 touchdowns, and 1 interception as the Jets lost by a score of 31–28. He also scored a rushing touchdown, becoming the first Jets quarterback since Al Dorow in 1960 to score three passing touchdowns and one rushing touchdown in a game. He threw nine touchdowns from Week 5 to Week 8, becoming the first Jets quarterback since Ray Lucas in 1999 to throw multiple touchdowns in four straight games. During Week 10, he became the oldest quarterback in NFL history to set a career high for touchdown passes in a season with his 14th touchdown pass. During Week 13 against the Chiefs, McCown threw for 331 yards and a touchdown while also rushing for 2 touchdowns as the Jets won by a score of 38–31. He joined Doug Flutie and Jim Thorpe as the only players in NFL history to rush for at least two touchdowns in a game at the age of 38 or older. McCown was named the AFC Offensive Player of the Week for Week 13. During Week 14 against the Broncos, McCown threw for 46 yards while also turning the ball over twice on an interception and a fumble before leaving the game late in the third quarter after an apparent hand injury as the Jets lost by a score of 23–0. Shortly after the game, it was revealed that McCown had suffered a broken left hand. The next day, head coach Todd Bowles announced that McCown would undergo surgery on his left hand, putting him out for the remainder of the 2017 season. He was placed on injured reserve on December 12. McCown played in 13 games, all starts, in 2017 and completed 267 of 397 passes for 2,926 yards, 18 touchdowns and 9 interceptions while also rushing for 124 yards and 5 touchdowns. His completions, passing yards, passing touchdowns and rushing touchdowns were all single-season career highs. He also had a career-high 67.3 completion percentage (the fourth-highest in the NFL that year). The Jets went 5–11 overall and were 5–8 in McCown's starts. He was named the Curtis Martin Jets Team MVP and the Kyle Clifton "Good Guy" Award winner.

==== 2018 ====
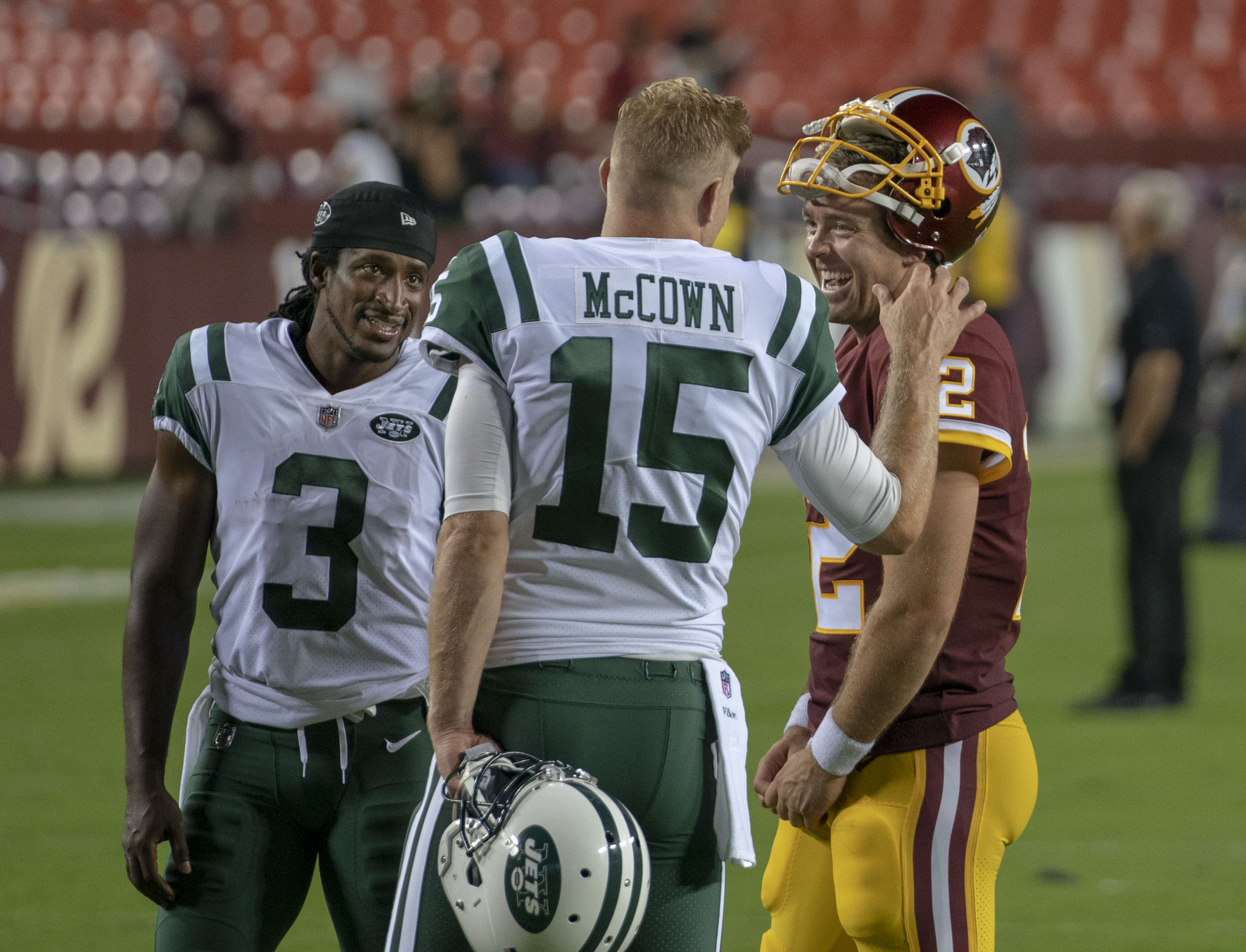
McCown (center) with Andre Roberts (left) and Colt McCoy (right) in 2018

On March 13, 2018, McCown signed a one-year, $10 million contract to remain with the Jets. During training camp and the subsequent preseason, McCown competed with Teddy Bridgewater and rookie Sam Darnold for the starting job. Eventually, Darnold was named the team's starter after Bridgewater was traded to the Saints, solidifying McCown's role as the primary backup going into the 2018 season. He was the highest paid backup in the NFL. With Darnold inactive due to a right foot injury, McCown started in Week 10 against the Buffalo Bills, where he finished with 135 passing yards and two interceptions as the Jets lost 41–10. Following a bye week, the Jets played against the Patriots in Week 12, where McCown finished with 276 passing yards, a touchdown, and an interception as the Jets lost 27–13. During Week 13 against the Titans, McCown finished with 128 passing yards and an interception as the Jets lost 26–22. Darnold returned from his injury and started the remainder of the 2018 season for the Jets. McCown played in 4 games, with 3 starts, in 2018 and completed 60 of 110 passes for 539 yards, 1 touchdown and 4 interceptions.

=== Philadelphia Eagles ===
==== 2019 ====
On June 17, 2019, McCown announced his retirement from the NFL in a letter to The Players' Tribune. That same day, it was also announced that ESPN had hired McCown as an NFL analyst.

However, on August 17, 2019, McCown signed with the Eagles following injuries to the team's backup quarterbacks, Nate Sudfeld and Cody Kessler. In Week 2 against the Falcons, McCown briefly came into the game to relieve an injured Carson Wentz for a few plays. In Week 14, against the Giants, McCown almost entered the game as a wide receiver due to injuries among the Eagles' receiver corps. McCown mentored Wentz, and several wide receivers on the practice squad, as the Eagles won four straight games to win the division title and reach the playoffs after a 5–7 start marred by numerous injuries.

In the Wild Card Round of the 2019–20 NFL playoffs, McCown entered the game in the first quarter in relief of an injured Wentz, who suffered a helmet-to-helmet collision with the Seahawks' Jadeveon Clowney. McCown, who was 40 years old at the time, became the oldest quarterback to make his postseason debut, passing Vince Evans, whose postseason debut was at 35 years old. McCown was also the oldest quarterback in Eagles history, and the first NFL player since Sonny Jurgensen in 1974 to complete his first-ever playoff pass at the age of 40. Overall, McCown completed 18 of 24 passes for 174 yards with no touchdowns nor turnovers and a passer rating of 94.8, while rushing 6 times for 23 yards and being sacked 6 times, leading the Eagles to three field goals in a 17–9 loss to the visiting Seahawks. He later revealed during an interview that he tore his hamstring off of the bone in the second quarter, but continued to play.

==== 2020 ====
Following the playoff loss, the Eagles offered McCown a role on the team's coaching staff for the 2020 season, but he declined, as he was still interested in continuing his playing career. On September 6, 2020, the Eagles signed McCown to their practice squad to serve as an emergency quarterback, making him the oldest practice squad player in NFL history. While on the Eagles' practice squad, McCown worked remotely from his home in Texas, becoming the first NFL player in history to work remotely. He video conferenced into team meetings, and threw the football with his sons, who were high school players. Tim McManus of ESPN.com speculated that McCown working remotely was due to the COVID-19 pandemic.

=== Houston Texans ===
On November 7, 2020, McCown was signed to the Texans' active roster off of the Eagles' practice squad. He served as the third-string quarterback behind starter Deshaun Watson and backup A. J. McCarron during the 2020 season. He was released on March 1, 2021. In October 2021, it was reported that the 42-year-old McCown, who was coaching high school football in Texas at the time and had not officially retired as a player, still had some interest from several NFL teams in potentially signing with them after his high school season was over. However, he did not end up signing with any more NFL teams.

== Legacy and playing style ==
McCown played in 102 regular season games, starting 76, during his NFL career, completing 60.2 percent of his passes for 17,731 yards, 98 touchdowns, and 82 interceptions while also rushing for 1,106 yards and 13 touchdowns. He had a record of 23 wins and 53 losses as a starter. Despite never starting 16 games in a season, McCown finished in the top five in most fumbles four times during his NFL career (third most in 2004 with 12 fumbles, fifth most in 2007 with 11 fumbles, fourth most in 2014 with 10 fumbles, and fifth most in 2017 with 11 fumbles). He fumbled 81 times overall (tied with Steve Grogan for the 48th most in NFL history, among any position, as of 2025) and lost 33 of them. McCown was the last active player from the 2002 draft class. NFL Films released two shorts about McCown; "The Man of Many Jerseys" in 2017 and "The Lumberjack Quarterback" in 2020. He is tied with Ryan Fitzpatrick for the most NFL teams played for among quarterbacks with nine. (Note: Quarterback Josh Johnson has been signed to 14 NFL teams but only played in regular season games for seven of them.) McCown played for 19 different offensive coordinators during his time in the NFL. From his junior year of high school until his final year in the NFL, McCown had a different offensive coordinator every season (27 different offensive coordinators in total).

According to Pro Football Focus, McCown had the highest passer rating on deep balls during the 2013 NFL season (130.0). Buccaneers offensive coordinator Marcus Arroyo said McCown had a longtime habit of holding the ball too low when moving in the pocket, increasing the potential for fumbles. In 2015, The Washington Post said the "Brothers McCown (Josh and Luke) have somehow survived over an athletic lifetime despite having the gridiron skill set of a pylon." In 2017, New England Patriots head coach Bill Belichick said of McCown, "Very athletic guy. You can see his ability to run, extend plays, get out of trouble. He plays on his feet well, has good feet in the pocket. But look, he’s a tough guy. He’s very smart. I don’t know what happened in all of the situations that he was in. I just know what I see on film and from our interactions with him competitively. He’s a good player. He’s accurate. He gets the ball out quickly. He gets it to the open guy. If you make a mistake he is going to make you pay for it. If you line up in something that he can take advantage of then he can get his team into whatever the game plan play is, those types of things."

== Career statistics ==
Legend
**Bold**	Career high
	Led the league

=== NFL ===
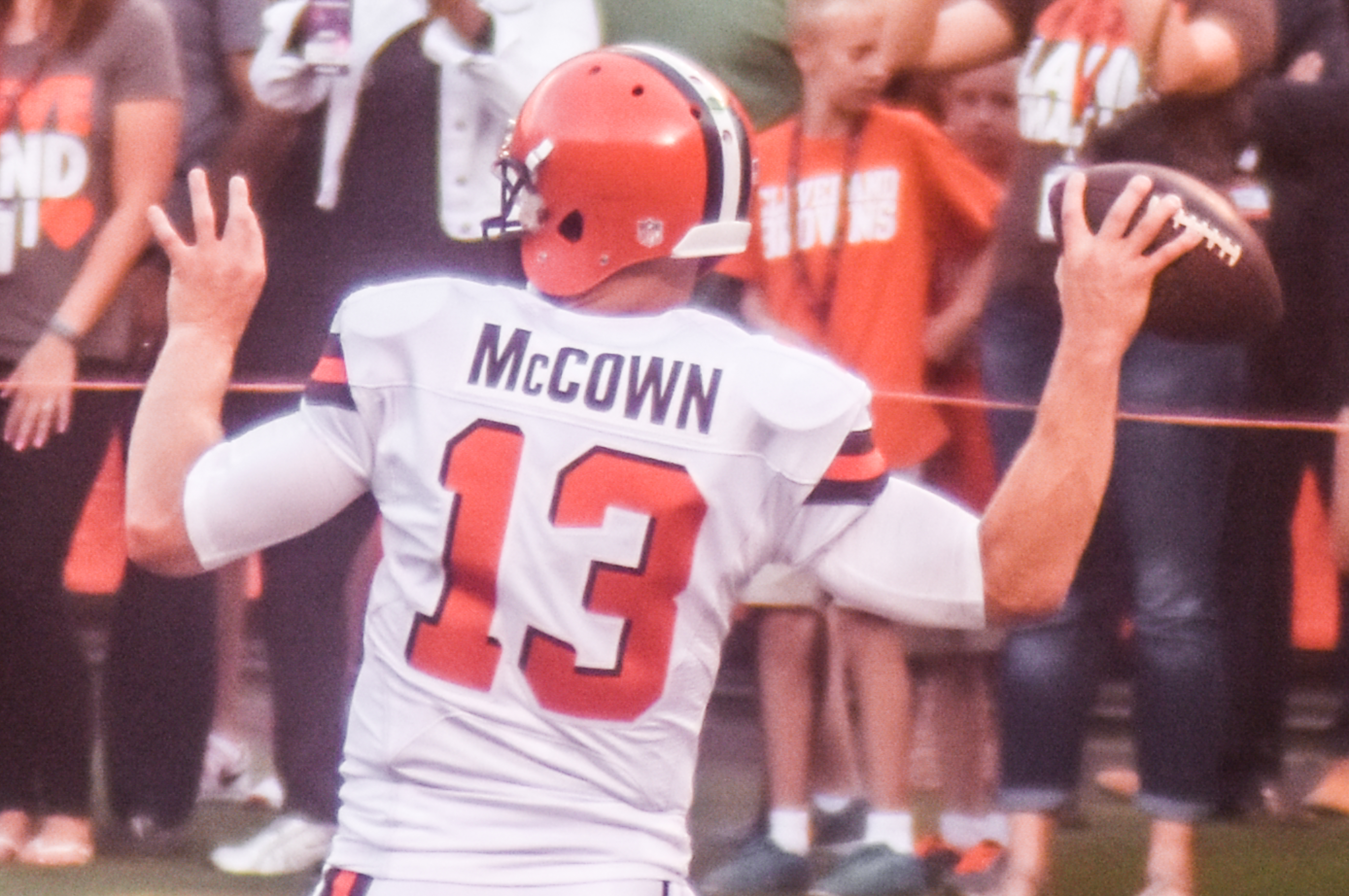
McCown in 2015

==== Regular season ====
Year	Team	Games			Passing								Rushing				Sacks		Fumbles (Note: Fumbles lost data taken from Pro Football Reference career game log)	
Year	Team	GP	GS	Record	Cmp	Att	Pct	Yds	Y/A	TD	Int	Rtg	Att	Yds	Avg	TD	Sck	SckY	Fum	Lost
2002	ARI	2	0	–	7	18	38.9	66	3.7	0	2	10.2	1	20	**20.0**	0	5	50	1	1
2003	ARI	8	3	1–2	95	166	57.2	1,018	6.1	5	6	70.3	28	**158**	5.6	1	25	174	10	2
2004	ARI	**14**	**13**	**6**–7	233	**408**	57.1	2,511	6.2	11	10	74.1	36	112	3.1	2	31	263	**12**	5
2005	ARI	9	6	3–3	163	270	60.4	1,836	6.8	9	11	74.9	29	139	4.8	0	18	101	5	3
2006	DET	2	0	–	0	0	0.0	0	0.0	0	0	0.0	0	0	0.0	0	0	0	0	0
2007	OAK	9	9	2–7	111	190	58.4	1,151	6.1	10	11	69.4	29	143	4.9	0	14	92	11	3
2008	CAR	2	0	–	0	0	0.0	0	0.0	0	0	0.0	4	−3	−0.8	0	0	0	0	0
2009	CAR	1	0	–	1	6	16.7	2	0.3	0	0	39.6	0	0	0.0	0	1	6	0	0
2011	CHI	3	2	1–1	35	55	63.6	414	7.5	2	4	68.3	12	68	5.7	0	7	43	2	0
2012	CHI	0	0	DNP																
2013	CHI	8	5	3–2	149	224	66.5	1,829	**8.2**	13	1	**109.0**	13	69	5.3	1	11	37	3	1
2014	TB	11	11	1–**10**	184	327	56.3	2,206	6.7	11	**14**	70.5	25	127	5.1	3	36	235	10	4
2015	CLE	8	8	1–7	186	292	63.7	2,109	7.2	12	4	93.3	20	98	4.9	1	23	137	9	**6**
2016	CLE	5	3	0–3	90	165	54.5	1,100	6.7	6	6	72.3	7	21	3.0	0	18	126	7	4
2017	NYJ	13	**13**	5–8	**267**	397	**67.3**	**2,926**	7.4	**18**	9	94.5	**37**	124	3.4	**5**	**39**	**264**	11	4
2018	NYJ	4	3	0–3	60	110	54.5	539	4.9	1	4	55.8	5	32	6.4	0	7	35	0	0
2019	PHI	3	0	–	3	5	60.0	24	4.8	0	0	72.1	2	−2	−1	0	0	0	0	0
2020	HOU	0	0	DNP																
Career		102	76	23–53	1,584	2,633	60.2	17,731	6.7	98	82	79.7	248	1,106	4.5	13	235	1,563	81	33

==== Playoffs ====
Year	Team	Games			Passing								Rushing				Sacks		Fumbles	
Year	Team	GP	GS	Record	Cmp	Att	Pct	Yds	Y/A	TD	Int	Rtg	Att	Yds	Avg	TD	Sck	SckY	Fum	Lost
2008	CAR	0	0	DNP																
2019	PHI	1	0	–	18	24	75.0	174	7.2	0	0	94.8	5	23	4.6	0	6	14	2	0
Career		1	0	0–0	18	24	75.0	174	7.2	0	0	94.8	5	23	4.6	0	6	14	2	0

=== UFL ===
Year	Team	Games			Passing								Rushing				Sacks		Fumbles	
Year	Team	GP	GS	Record	Cmp	Att	Pct	Yds	Y/A	TD	Int	Rtg	Att	Yds	Avg	TD	Sck	SckY	Fum	Lost
2010	HAR	8	8	3–5	114	202	56.4	1,463	7.2	10	8	79.3	10	35	3.5	0	15	107	3	3
Career		8	8	3–5	114	202	56.4	1,463	7.2	10	8	79.3	10	35	3.5	0	15	107	3	3

=== College ===
Year	Team	Passing								Rushing			
Year	Team	Cmp	Att	Pct	Yds	Y/A	TD	Int	Rtg	Att	Yds	Avg	TD
1998	SMU	46	99	46.5	619	6.3	7	8	106.2	51	35	0.7	0
1999	SMU	125	234	53.4	1,434	6.1	11	10	111.9	69	−9	−0.1	1
2000	SMU	169	331	51.1	1,969	5.9	9	16	100.3	78	175	2.2	3
2001	Sam Houston State	259	429	60.4	3,481	8.1	32	12	147.6	112	351	3.1	6
Career		599	1,093	54.8	7,503	6.9	59	46	121.9	310	552	1.7	10

== Career highlights ==
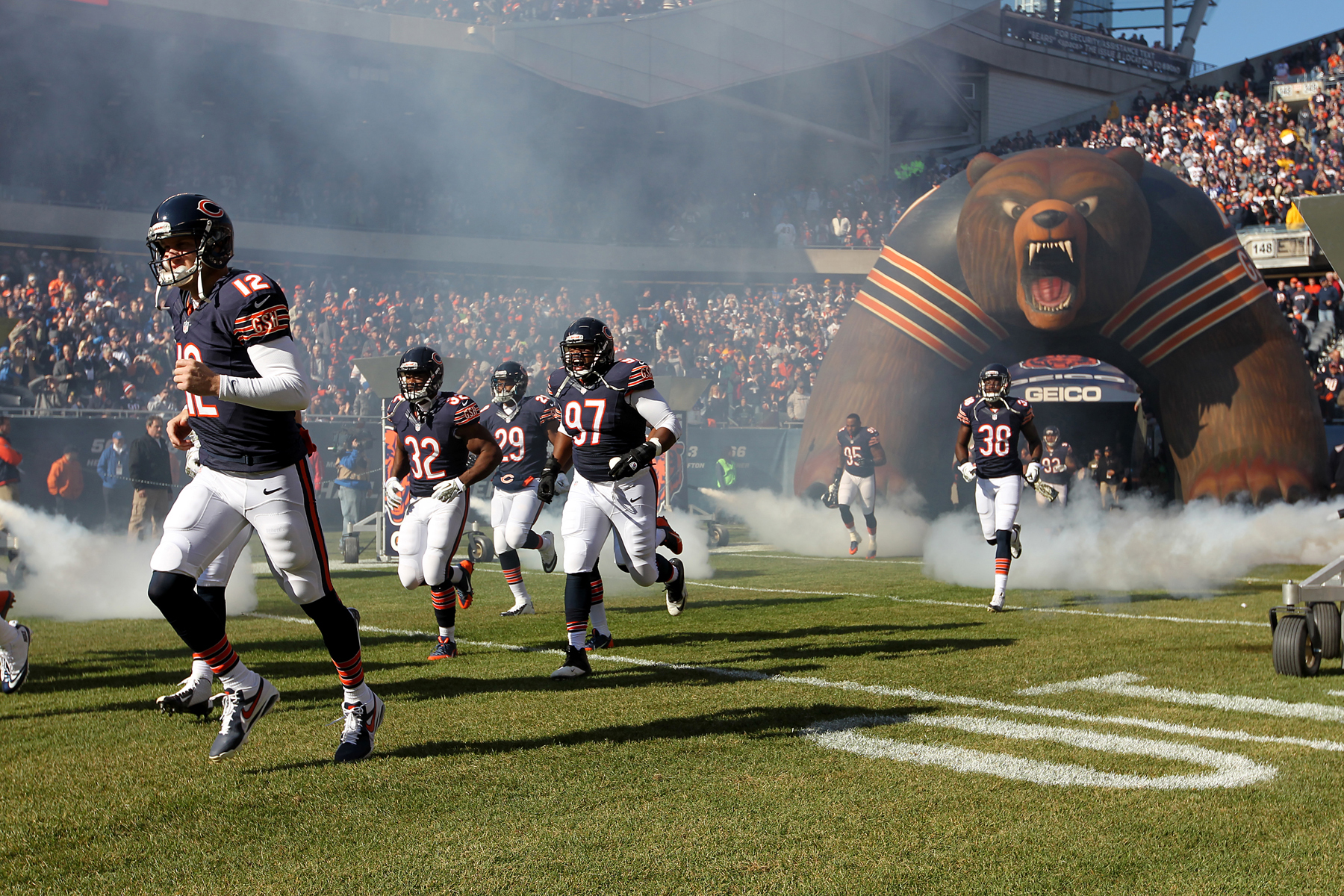
McCown (left) running out of the Bears tunnel in 2013

=== Awards and honors ===
NFL

- USA Today All-Joe Team (2013)
- 2× AFC Offensive Player of the Week (Week 5, 2015; Week 13, 2017)
- NFC Offensive Player of the Week (Week 14, 2013)
- NFL interception percentage leader (0.4%, 2013)
- Brian Piccolo Award (2013)
- Dino Lucarelli "Good Guy" Award (2015)
- Curtis Martin Jets Team MVP (2017)
- Kyle Clifton "Good Guy" Award (2017)
- NFL Quarterback Challenge winner (2007)

UFL

- UFL passer rating leader (2010)
- UFL Offensive Player of the Week (Week 1, 2010)

College

- SFL Player of the Year (2001)
- Third-team Division I-AA All-American (2001)
- First-team All-SFL (2001)
- Sam Houston Athletic Hall of Honor (2013)

=== Records ===
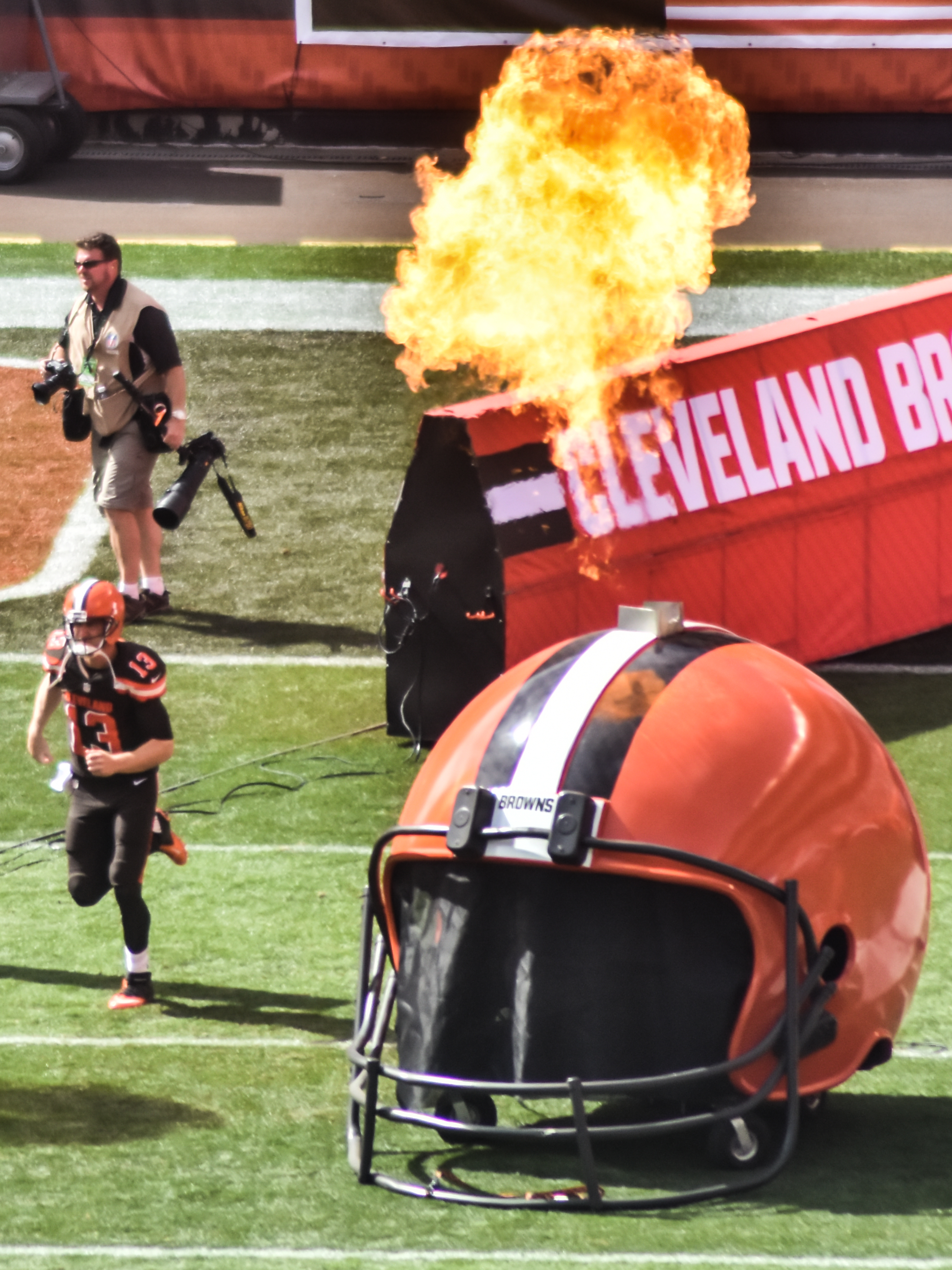
McCown running out of the Browns tunnel in 2015

NFL

- Most NFL teams played for, quarterbacks (9 teams, tied with Ryan Fitzpatrick)
- First NFL player with at least 450 passing yards, 2 passing touchdowns, 1 rushing touchdown, and 0 interceptions in a game (2015)
- NFL record single-season interception percentage (0.4%: 2013, broken by Aaron Rodgers in 2018)
- Chicago Bears single-season passer rating (109.0: 2013)
- Chicago Bears career passer rating (101.0)
- Chicago Bears single-game record for completions (36, tied with Nick Foles)
- First Chicago Bears player to throw for 300 yards in three straight games (2013)
- First Cleveland Browns player to throw for 300 yards in three straight games (2015)
- First Arizona Cardinals player to throw for 350 yards in back-to-back games (2005)
- Most 300-yard games with different franchises (6, broken by Ryan Fitzpatrick)
- Cleveland Browns record for passing yards in a regular season game (457, broken by Jameis Winston in 2024)
- Most passing yards in a three-game span in Browns history (1,154)
- Most passing yards in an international game (385, 2005; broken by Kirk Cousins in 2016)
- Oldest quarterback in NFL history to set a career high for touchdown passes in a season (38 years old, 2017)
- Oldest quarterback to make his playoff debut (40 years old, 2019)
- Oldest quarterback in Philadelphia Eagles history (40 years old, 2019)
- Oldest practice squad player in NFL history (41 years old, 2020; since broken)
- First NFL player to work remotely (2020)

College

- SMU record for consecutive completions (19, 1999)
- Sam Houston State single-season passing records in completions, attempts, yards, and touchdowns (2001, since broken)

== Coaching career ==
=== High school ===
McCown previously spent time as a volunteer quarterbacks coach for the Marvin Ridge High School Mavericks of Waxhaw, North Carolina. The team's head coach said "He just walked into my office one day and asked if he could help out." In 2010, prior to signing with the Colonials, McCown began helping the Mavericks during the offseason. After the 2010 UFL season ended, McCown spent another offseason volunteering with the Mavericks. He then left the school upon being signed by the 49ers in August 2011 but returned once the 49ers released him in September 2011. Several days after Marvin Ridge lost its playoff game in November 2011, McCown was signed by the Bears. McCown was released by the Bears in August 2012 and immediately upon arriving home at the airport, McCown went straight to a Marvin Ridge game and joined the team while the game was in progress. Similarly, days after Marvin Ridge lost its playoff game in November 2012, McCown was again signed by the Bears. McCown also spent time as the scout team quarterback while at Marvin Ridge, with one player saying "I don't think anybody in the country had a better scout-team quarterback." McCown also cooked pancakes for the Fellowship of Christian Athletes breakfasts on Fridays and spent time teaching physical education classes at Marvin Ridge.

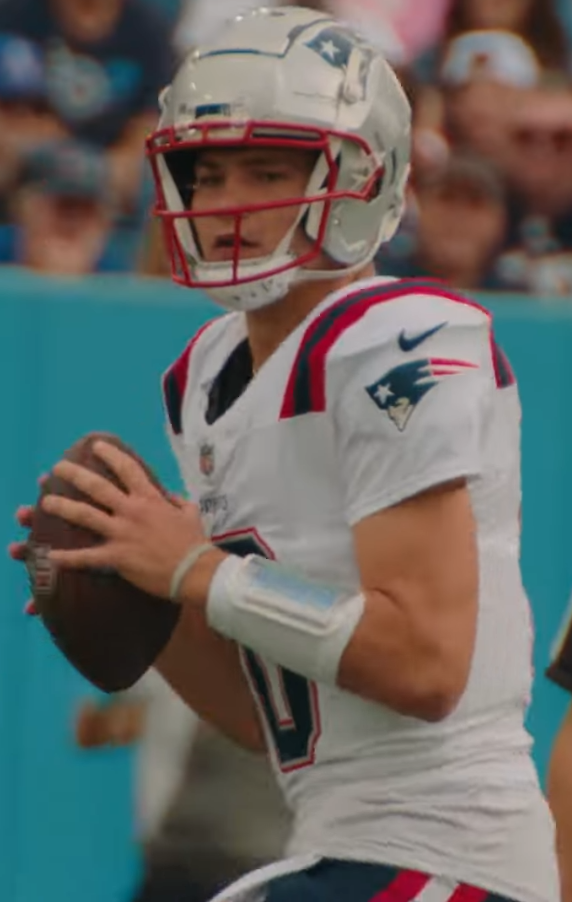
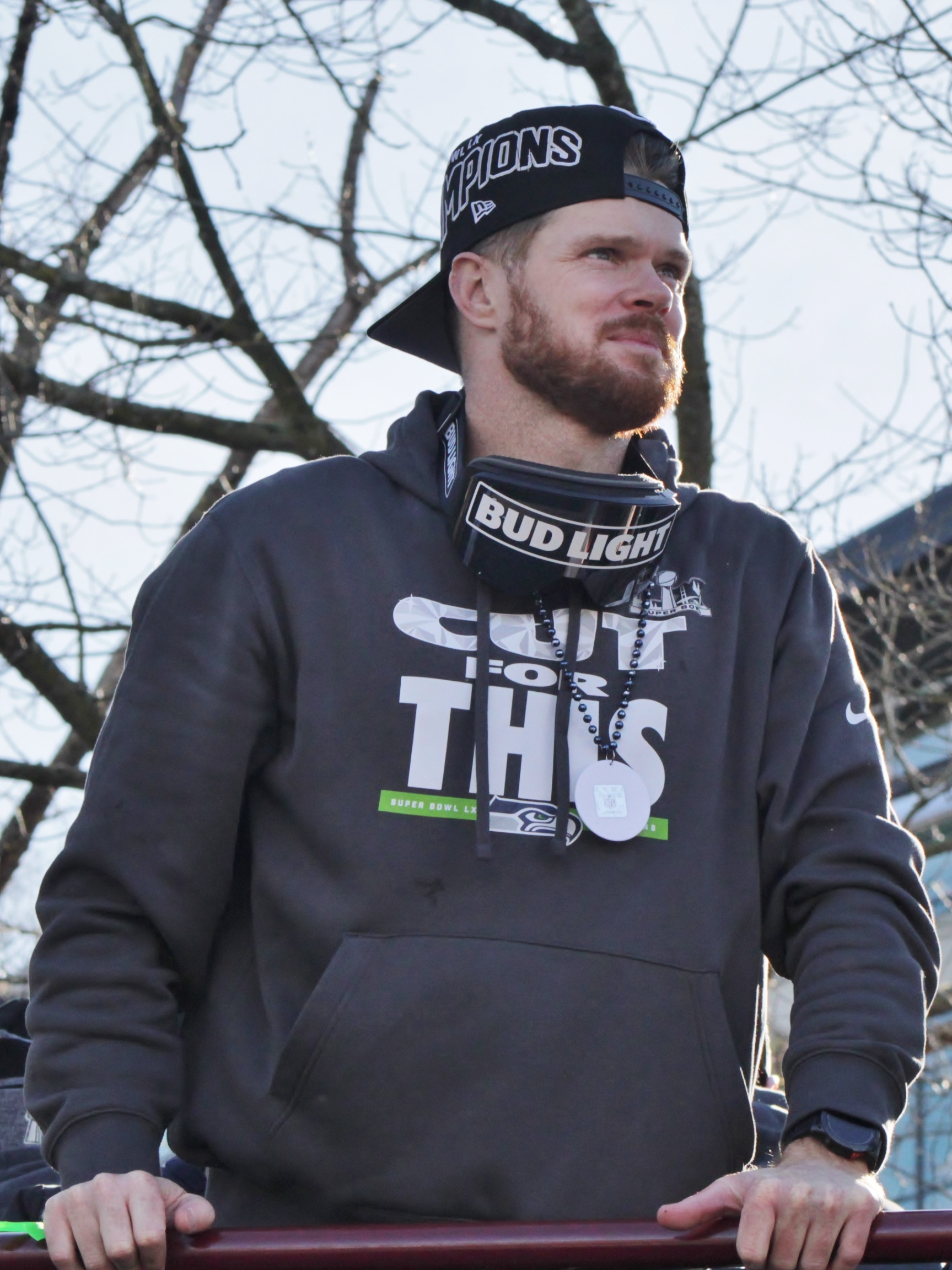
Both of the starting quarterbacks in Super Bowl LX (Drake Maye and Sam Darnold) were formerly coached by McCown

McCown also served as an assistant coach at Myers Park High School in Charlotte, North Carolina, where his sons Owen and Aiden played. With his 2019 return to the NFL, the Eagles allowed him to fly to Charlotte on Mondays for high school practice and game planning, and then again on Fridays for game days. He coached future NFL quarterback Drake Maye while at Myers Park. In 2020, McCown moved to Rusk, Texas and began serving as an assistant coach at Rusk High School, where Owen and Aiden now played.

=== NFL ===
McCown, while still a player for the Houston Texans, interviewed for the Texans' head coach position in January 2021. He was also reportedly offered a position as associate head coach but turned it down. He interviewed for the Texans' head coach position again in January 2022.

On February 10, 2023, McCown was hired by the Carolina Panthers as their quarterbacks coach under head coach Frank Reich. On November 27, 2023, McCown was fired by the Panthers, alongside Reich and assistant head coach Duce Staley, after a 1–10 start to the season.

On February 27, 2024, McCown was hired to be the quarterbacks coach of the Minnesota Vikings under head coach Kevin O'Connell. During the 2024 season, McCown helped his former teammate Sam Darnold earn Pro Bowl honors for the first time. In January 2025, McCown interviewed for the Jets' head coach job. Both of the starting quarterbacks in Super Bowl LX (Drake Maye and Sam Darnold) were formerly coached by McCown. On February 24, 2026, the Vikings promoted McCown to offensive passing game coordinator/quarterbacks coach.

== Personal life ==
During the 2017 offseason, McCown, his wife Natalie, and their four children moved from Waxhaw, North Carolina, to Waxahachie, Texas. McCown later moved to Charlotte in 2018, and to Rusk, Texas in 2020. He is a Christian. He grew up a Dallas Cowboys fan. His inspiration for wearing No. 12, the jersey number that he wore the majority of his career, comes from Roger Staubach, who also wore No. 12. He was also a fan of Cowboys players Michael Irvin, Emmitt Smith, and Troy Aikman, as well as quarterbacks Joe Montana, John Elway, and Randall Cunningham.

McCown is the older brother of former NFL quarterback Luke McCown and younger brother of former Texas A&M quarterback Randy McCown. In 2003, the McCown brothers hosted the first-ever McCown Passing Camp in their hometown of Jacksonville, Texas. He is also the father of UTSA Roadrunners quarterback Owen McCown and Lamar Cardinals quarterback Aiden McCown.

McCown is a member of the Fellowship of Christian Athletes. He has served in Pro Athletes Outreach and Coaches Time Out, which are both ministries. He has also spent time speaking to church youth and men's groups during the offseason.
