= Luke McCown =

American football player (born 1981)

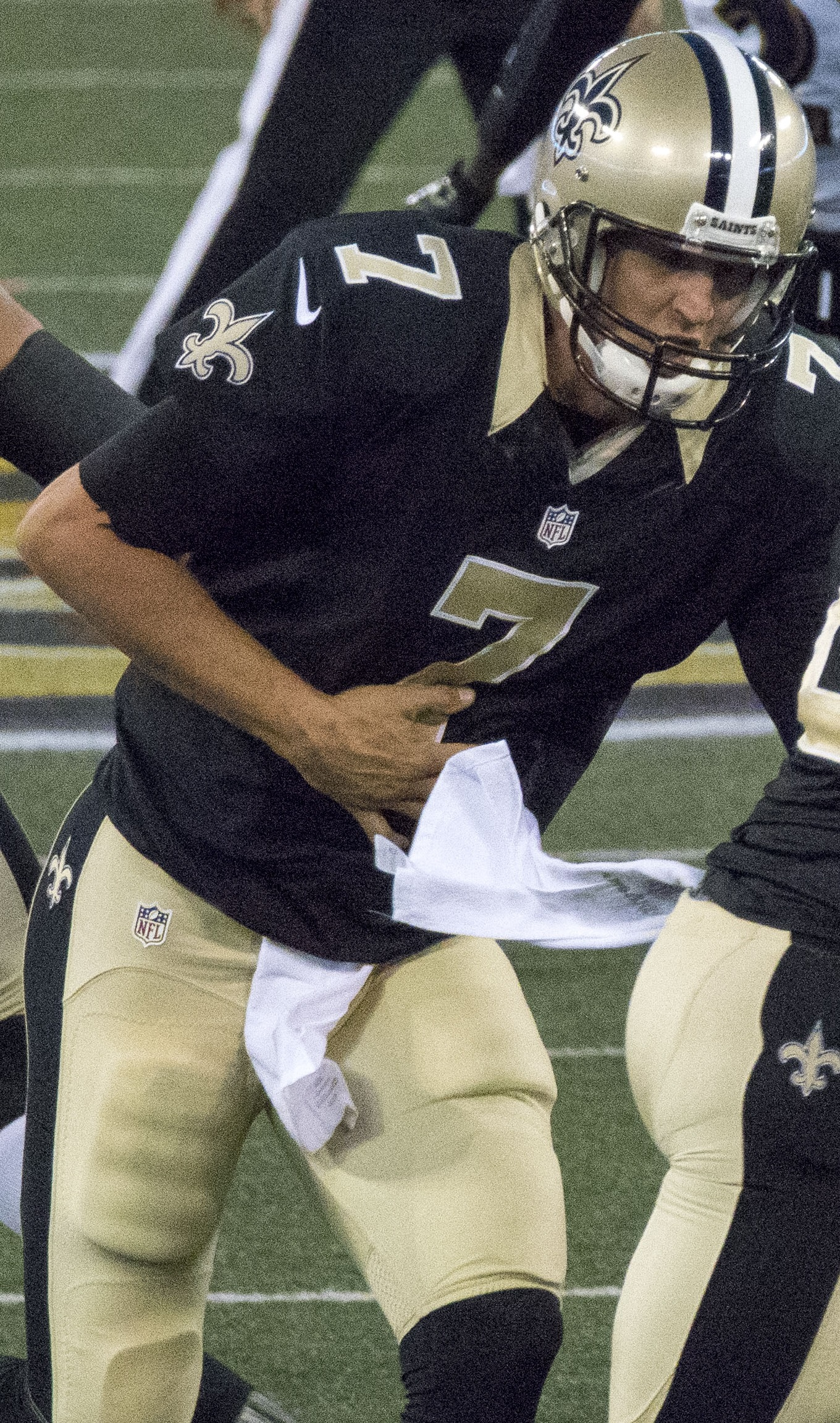
- McCown with the New Orleans Saints in 2015

No. 12, 7
- Position: Quarterback

Personal information
- Born: July 12, 1981 (age 45); Jacksonville, Texas, U.S.
- Listed height: 6 ft 4 in (1.93 m)
- Listed weight: 217 lb (98 kg)

Career information
- High school: Jacksonville
- College: Louisiana Tech (2000–2003)
- NFL draft: 2004: 4th round, 106th overall pick

Career history
- Cleveland Browns (2004); Tampa Bay Buccaneers (2005–2008); Jacksonville Jaguars (2009–2011); New Orleans Saints (2012)*; Atlanta Falcons (2012); New Orleans Saints (2013–2016); Dallas Cowboys (2017)*
- * Offseason or practice squad member only

Career NFL statistics
- Passing attempts: 356
- Passing completions: 216
- Completion percentage: 60.7%
- TD–INT: 9–15
- Passing yards: 2,370
- Passer rating: 71.3
- Stats at Pro Football Reference

Lucas Patrick McCown (born July 12, 1981) is an American former professional football player who was a quarterback in the National Football League (NFL). He played college football for the Louisiana Tech Bulldogs and was selected by the Cleveland Browns in the fourth round of the 2004 NFL draft. He played in the NFL for the Browns, Tampa Bay Buccaneers, Jacksonville Jaguars, Atlanta Falcons, and New Orleans Saints.

== Early life ==
McCown was born and raised in Jacksonville, Texas. Like his older brothers Josh and Randy McCown, he showed an aptitude for sports. He attended Jacksonville High School.

In basketball, he garnered All-District and All-East Texas honors.

== College career ==
Although he was nationally ranked as a football recruit (as high as No. 2 among quarterbacks in some publications), McCown accepted a football scholarship from Louisiana Tech University over the University of Oklahoma and Florida State University.

As a true freshman, he became the starter in the fifth game, after Brian Stallworth was lost with a season-ending injury. His college debut came in the second half of the fourth game against the University of Tulsa. He had six touchdown passes (fourth in school history) in a 48–14 win against the University of Louisiana at Lafayette. He set an NCAA single-game freshman record by throwing the ball 72 times in the 42–31 loss against the University of Miami.

As a sophomore, he led the team to the Western Athletic Conference championship, the school's first conference title since the early 1980s. He threw for 464 yards and four touchdowns in a critical 48–45 league win over Boise State University. The school was invited to the 2001 Humanitarian Bowl against Clemson University, its first bowl appearance since the 1990 Independence Bowl.

He contributed to two of the biggest wins in school history, a 39–36 win over Oklahoma State University, which came down to a 36-yard touchdown pass on a fourth-down-and-10 with 60 seconds in the opener of his junior season, and a 20–19 win against Michigan State University, passing for two touchdowns in the final 70 seconds, including the game-winning 11-yard throw with 2 seconds left in the third game of his senior season.

He started 42 out of 43 games of his college career, establishing school records for completions (1,088), attempts (1,827) and passing yards (12,994). His 88 touchdown passes ranked eighth-most in NCAA Division I-A history. He also had 11 rushing touchdowns. He still holds several NCAA Division I FBS records:

- Most plays by a freshman in a single game (80) - Louisiana Tech vs. Miami, FL, October 28, 2000. McCown gained 444 total yards during the game.
- Most attempted passes by a freshman in a single game (72) - Louisiana Tech vs. Miami, FL, October 28, 2000. He completed 42 of those passes.
- Most completed passes by a freshman in a single game (47) - Louisiana Tech vs. Auburn, October 21, 2000. He attempted 65 passes in all.
- Most seasons of 2,000+ yards (4) - From 2000 to 2003, McCown gained 2,544, 3,337, 3,539, and 3,246 yards.

In 2017, he was inducted into the Louisiana Tech Athletics Hall of Fame.

== Professional career ==
Pre-draft measurables
Height	Weight	Arm length	Hand span	40-yard dash	10-yard split	20-yard split	20-yard shuttle	Three-cone drill	Vertical jump	Broad jump	Wonderlic
6 ft 3 7/8 in (1.93 m)	208 lb (94 kg)	31 3/8 in (0.80 m)	9 3/8 in (0.24 m)	4.69 s	1.67 s	2.71 s	4.21 s	6.74 s	37.5 in (0.95 m)	10 ft 5 in (3.18 m)	24
All values from NFL Combine

=== Cleveland Browns ===
McCown was selected by the Cleveland Browns in the fourth round (106th overall) of the 2004 NFL draft. He went on to start in four games for in his rookie season. On April 24, 2005, he was traded to the Tampa Bay Buccaneers in exchange for a sixth round 2005 draft pick (#203-Andrew Hoffman).

=== Tampa Bay Buccaneers ===
In 2005, McCown was declared inactive but dressed as the third-string quarterback for the first ten games. He was the backup quarterback for the last seven contests, including one playoff game.

In 2006, McCown was injured during the preseason. He spent the first seven weeks of the regular season on the physically unable to perform list. He was activated on November 3. He was declared inactive but dressed as the third-string quarterback for the final nine games of the season.

In 2007, McCown appeared in five games with three starts, registering 1,009 passing yards, three interceptions, five touchdowns and a 91.7 quarterback rating. In week 13, he produced his finest performance as an NFL quarterback, throwing for 313 yards and two touchdowns during an emergency start for the injured Jeff Garcia in the Buccaneers 27–23 victory over the New Orleans Saints. McCown started the next game against the Houston Texans and was 25-38 for 266 yards and no interceptions, but a loss. He came in relief in the second half of week 16 and threw for 185 yards and one interception. He started the last game as the Bucs had already clinched a playoff spot. He threw for 236 yards and one interception with two touchdowns.

In 2008, McCown played in two games against the Carolina Panthers and the San Diego Chargers.

=== Jacksonville Jaguars ===
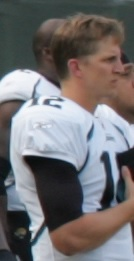
McCown with the Jacksonville Jaguars in 2009

On September 5, 2009, McCown was traded to the Jacksonville Jaguars in exchange for a seventh round 2010 draft pick. He was the backup to starting quarterback David Garrard, seeing limited action in three games. McCown was active but did not play in 13 contests.

In 2010, he played in the fourth quarter of the second game against the San Diego Chargers, completing 11 of 19 passes for 120 yards, but suffered a season-ending knee injury with 41 seconds remaining. He was placed on the injured reserve list on September 21.

On September 6, 2011, five days before the 2011 regular season opener, Jacksonville announced they were cutting Garrard and that McCown would succeed him as starter for the season opener. He made his first start as a Jaguar in the season opener against the Tennessee Titans, completing 17 of 24 passes for 175 yards. On September 18, McCown was benched in favor of Blaine Gabbert, after posting the lowest passer rating (1.8) for a starting quarterback in club history. He appeared in four games with two starts, completing 30 of 56 attempts for 296 yards and four interceptions.

=== New Orleans Saints (first stint) ===
On June 7, 2012, McCown signed with the New Orleans Saints. He was released by the team on August 28, 2012.

=== Atlanta Falcons ===
On August 28, 2012, the Atlanta Falcons signed McCown to replace the released Chris Redman. As Matt Ryan's backup, McCown appeared in two games, on September 27 when Atlanta won 27–3 over the San Diego Chargers and December 16 when Atlanta won 34–0 over the New York Giants.

=== New Orleans Saints (second stint) ===
On April 1, 2013, McCown signed a one-year, $1.05 million deal with the Saints. After solid performances in preseason games, McCown was selected to serve as the primary backup to Saints starting quarterback Drew Brees. During the regular season he attempted a pass but it fell incomplete. In the regular season, McCown was the holder for placekicker Garrett Hartley.

On September 25, 2015, Sean Payton announced that Brees would miss the first game of his Saints career due to a bruised rotator cuff and that McCown would get the start on September 27 against the Carolina Panthers over rookie Garrett Grayson, marking McCown's first start since 2011 with the Jaguars. Luke's older brother Josh started for the Browns the same day, marking the first time both McCown brothers had started on the same day since December 9, 2007. On November 5, McCown underwent successful lower-back surgery, effectively ending his season after he was placed on injured reserve. McCown completed 32 of 39 passes for 335 yards and an 82.1 completion percentage in 2015.

On March 10, 2016, the Saints signed McCown to a two-year, $3 million contract with a signing bonus of $500,000. On April 5, 2017, he was released after the team signed quarterback Chase Daniel.

=== Dallas Cowboys ===
On July 28, 2017, McCown signed with the Dallas Cowboys on a one-year contract with $250,000 in guarantees. He was signed to help the team get through training camp and the preseason, after losing fourth-string backup Zac Dysert, who suffered a season and career-ending back injury. McCown was released on September 2, 2017.

On April 20, 2018, McCown announced his retirement.

== Career statistics ==
Legend
**Bold**	Career high

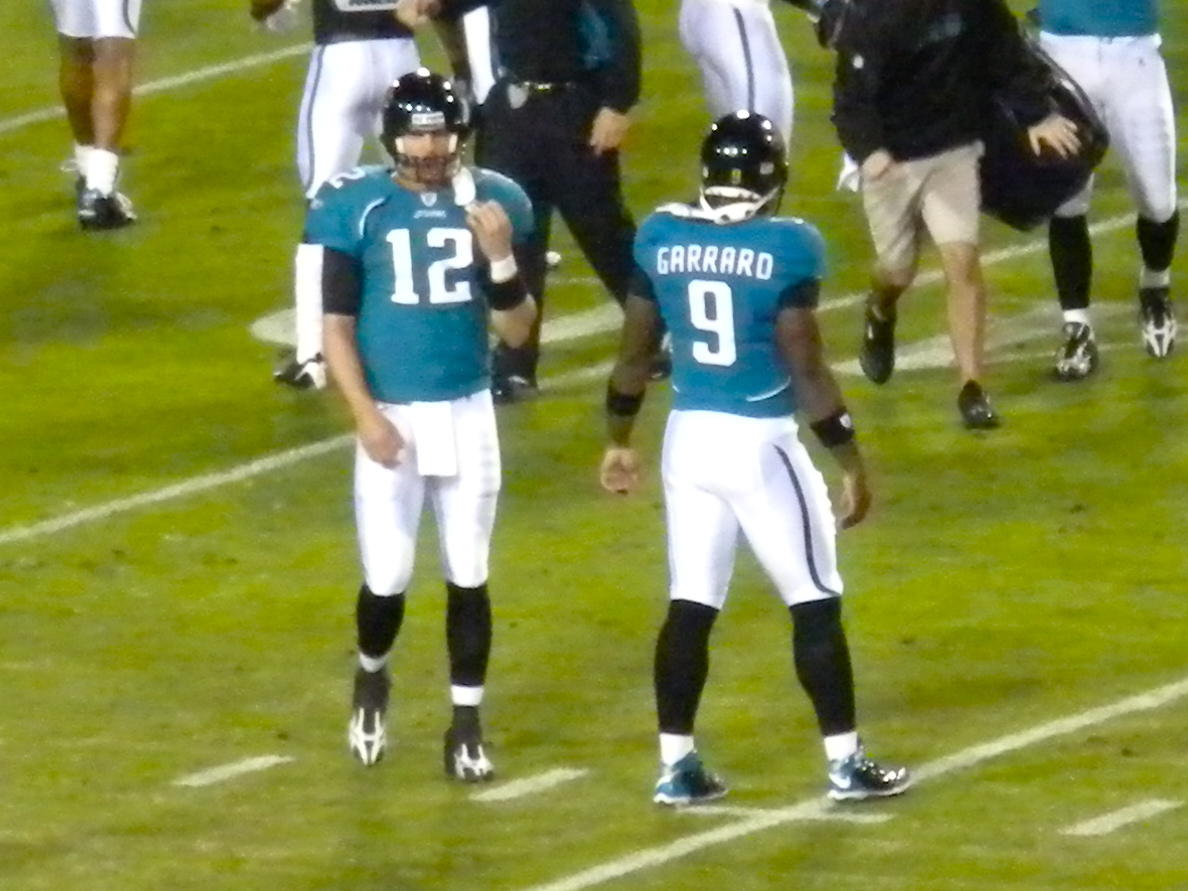
McCown and David Garrard in 2009

=== NFL ===
==== Regular season ====
Year	Team	Games			Passing								Rushing				Sacks		Fumbles (Note: Fumbles lost data taken from Pro Football Reference career game log)	
Year	Team	GP	GS	Record	Cmp	Att	Pct	Yds	Y/A	TD	Int	Rtg	Att	Yds	Avg	TD	Sck	SckY	Fum	Lost
2004	CLE	5	**4**	0–**4**	48	98	49.0	608	6.2	4	**7**	52.6	6	25	4.2	0	12	**122**	2	0
2005	TB	0	0	DNP																
2006	TB	0	0	DNP																
2007	TB	5	3	**1**–2	**94**	**139**	67.6	**1,009**	7.3	**5**	3	91.7	**12**	**117**	**9.8**	0	**15**	104	**3**	**2**
2008	TB	2	0	–	0	1	0.0	0	0.0	0	0	39.6	3	15	5.0	0	0	0	0	0
2009	JAX	3	0	–	1	3	33.3	2	0.7	0	0	42.4	0	0	0.0	0	2	7	0	0
2010	JAX	1	0	–	11	19	57.9	120	6.3	0	0	76.6	1	4	4.0	0	0	0	0	0
2011	JAX	4	2	**1**–1	30	56	53.6	296	5.3	0	4	39.0	7	23	3.3	0	4	38	2	1
2012	ATL	2	0	–	0	0	0.0	0	0.0	0	0	0.0	2	-3	-1.5	0	0	0	0	0
2013	NO	**16**	0	–	0	1	0.0	0	0.0	0	0	39.6	3	-4	-1.3	0	0	0	0	0
2014	NO	**16**	0	–	0	0	0.0	0	0.0	0	0	0.0	0	0	0.0	0	0	0	0	0
2015	NO	8	1	0–1	32	39	**82.1**	335	**8.6**	0	1	**91.8**	0	0	0.0	0	1	0	0	0
2016	NO	0	0	DNP																
Career		62	10	2–8	216	356	60.7	2,370	6.7	9	15	71.3	34	177	5.2	0	34	271	7	3

==== Playoffs ====
Year	Team	Games			Passing								Rushing				Sacks		Fumbles	
Year	Team	GP	GS	Record	Cmp	Att	Pct	Yds	Y/A	TD	Int	Rtg	Att	Yds	Avg	TD	Sck	SckY	Fum	Lost
2005	TB	0	0	DNP																
2007	TB	0	0	DNP																
2012	ATL	0	0	DNP																
2013	NO	0	0	DNP																

=== College ===
Season	Team	Passing								Rushing			
Season	Team	Cmp	Att	Pct	Yds	Y/A	TD	Int	Rtg	Att	Yds	Y/A	TD
2000	Louisiana Tech	244	369	66.1	2,544	6.9	21	15	134.7	55	-29	-0.5	3
2001	Louisiana Tech	277	469	59.1	3,337	7.1	28	14	132.6	87	144	1.7	4
2002	Louisiana Tech	296	505	58.6	3,539	7.0	19	19	122.4	61	30	0.5	2
2003	Louisiana Tech	246	432	56.9	3,246	7.5	19	14	128.1	71	-80	-1.1	1
Career		1,063	1,775	59.9	12,666	7.1	87	62	129.0	274	65	0.2	10

== Personal life ==
McCown's brother Josh was also a quarterback in the NFL. His older brother Randy played quarterback at Texas A&M University. Luke and his wife, Katy, have four sons and two daughters. McCown is a Christian.

In September 2015, he starred in a series of TV commercials for Verizon Wireless, talking about Verizon's reliability and backup generators, joking that "I bet if they just had the chance, some of those backups would really shine." McCown started a game against the Carolina Panthers shortly after the commercial initially aired due to an injury to starting quarterback Drew Brees, throwing for 310 yards in the 27–22 loss.

== See also ==
- List of NCAA Division I FBS quarterbacks with at least 12,000 career passing yards
