= Jim Jensen (wide receiver) =

American football player and coach (born 1958)

No. 11
- Positions: Wide receiver, quarterback

Personal information
- Born: November 14, 1958 (age 67); Abington, Pennsylvania, U.S.
- Listed height: 6 ft 4 in (1.93 m)
- Listed weight: 215 lb (98 kg)

Career information
- High school: Central Bucks West (Doylestown, Pennsylvania)
- College: Boston University (1977–1980)
- NFL draft: 1981: 11th round, 291st overall pick

Career history

Playing
- Miami Dolphins (1981–1992); Miami Hooters (1993–1994)

Coaching
- Florida Bobcats (1996) Head coach; Miami Tropics (2000) Head coach

Awards and highlights
- 50 Greatest Dolphins; Yankee Offensive Player of the Year (1980); First-team All-ECAC (1979); 2× First-team All-Yankee (1979, 1980); Boston University Terriers Athletics Hall of Fame

Career NFL statistics
- Receptions: 229
- Receiving yards: 2,171
- Receiving touchdowns: 19
- Stats at Pro Football Reference

Career AFL statistics
- Passing attempts: 539
- Passing completions: 290
- Completion percentage: 53.8%
- TD–INT: 51–18
- Passing yards: 3,256
- Stats at ArenaFan.com

James Christopher Jensen (born November 14, 1958), nicknamed "Crash", is an American former professional football player who was a wide receiver for the Miami Dolphins of the National Football League (NFL) from 1981 to 1992. He played college football as a quarterback for the Boston University Terriers. He also played for the Miami Hooters of the Arena Football League (AFL) at quarterback.

== Early life ==
Jensen attended Central Bucks High School West.

== College career ==
Jensen attended Boston University, playing college football for the Boston University Terriers at quarterback, compiling a 17–3–1 as the starter. As a junior in 1979, Jensen was selected to the all-ECAC team as well as all-conference team. In 1980 as a senior, Jensen was named the Yankee Conference Offensive Player of the Year as well as all-conference team once again.

He was inducted into the Boston University Terriers Athletics Hall of Fame in 1986.

== Professional career ==
Jensen played his entire 14-year career in Miami, 12 with the Miami Dolphins of the National Football League (NFL), and two for the Miami Hooters of the Arena Football League (AFL).

His best years came while teamed with quarterback Dan Marino and head coach Don Shula.

Jensen wore jersey no. 11 because he entered the league as a quarterback, then an ineligible number for a wide receiver. After Marino was selected in the 1983 NFL draft, it became evident that Jensen would need to find another way to survive on the Dolphins roster. He became a human Swiss army knife, with a knack for making tackles on punt and kickoff coverages and converting third down opportunities as a running back or wide receiver in the offensive set with Marino. On Mexican TV he was known as "the Thousand Uses" ("el Mil Usos" in Spanish) due to his versatility.

His best season statistically was in 1989 with 61 receptions for 557 yards and 6 receiving touchdowns, with 8 rushing attempts for 50 yards, and 1 passing attempt and completion for a 19-yard touchdown. He was named the Dolphins special teams most valuable player in 1988. Jensen finished his 12 NFL seasons with 229 receptions for 2,171 yards and 19 touchdowns. He also passed for two touchdowns. In 1989, he caught Marino's 200th career touchdown pass. Jim was also the 1988 NFL Special Teams Player of the Year.

== Head coaching career ==
Jensen was the head coach of the Florida Bobcats of the AFL in 1996. In 2000, he served as the head coach for the Miami Tropics of the Spring Football League (SFL).

== After football ==
Jensen was selected to the 50 Greatest Dolphins as the special teams player.

He was selected as the 2006 Miami Dolphins Unsung Hero.
