= Bobby McCray =

American football player (born 1981)

No. 93, 73
- Position: Defensive end

Personal information
- Born: August 8, 1981 (age 45); Miami, Florida, U.S.
- Listed height: 6 ft 6 in (1.98 m)
- Listed weight: 262 lb (119 kg)

Career information
- High school: Homestead (Homestead, Florida)
- College: Florida
- NFL draft: 2004: 7th round, 249th overall pick

Career history
- Jacksonville Jaguars (2004–2007); New Orleans Saints (2008–2009); Philadelphia Eagles (2010)

Awards and highlights
- Super Bowl champion (XLIV); Second-team All-SEC (2003)

Career NFL statistics
- Total tackles: 134
- Sacks: 29.5
- Forced fumbles: 9
- Fumble recoveries: 1
- Stats at Pro Football Reference

Bobby L. McCray Jr. (born August 8, 1981) is an American former professional football player who was a defensive end for seven seasons in the National Football League (NFL). He played college football for the Florida Gators. He was selected by the Jacksonville Jaguars in the seventh round of the 2004 NFL draft, and also played for the New Orleans Saints and Philadelphia Eagles of the NFL.

== Early life ==
McCray was born in Miami, Florida, in 1981. He attended Homestead High School in Homestead, Florida, and he played for the Homestead Broncos high school football team. As a senior, McCray was named to Prep Star's All-America team despite missing half of the season with an injury. He had thirty-two tackles with seven quarterback sacks.

== College career ==
McCray accepted an athletic scholarship to attend the University of Florida in Gainesville, Florida, where he played for coach Steve Spurrier and coach Ron Zook's Florida Gators football teams from 2000 to 2003. As a true freshman in 1999, he was redshirted by the Gators coaching staff. During the Gators' 2000, he played in three games. As a redshirt sophomore in 2001, he saw action in eight of eleven regular season games with two starts, and registered twelve tackles and seven "big plays" (2.5 sacks, 2.5 tackles-for-loss and two forced fumbles).

During his 2002 season, McCray played in all thirteen games, starting in five, and was a second-team All-Southeastern Conference (SEC) selection by The Sporting News. He recorded forty-five tackles (twenty solo), and 22.3 "big plays" (2.3 sacks, four tackles-for-loss, a forced fumble, a fumble recovery, and a block). As a senior in 2003, he earned second-team All-SEC honors. He played in twelve games, started in eight and finished with fifty tackles, 11.5 tackles for loss and 9.5 sacks.

In his four-season college career, McCray appeared in thirty-six games for the Gators, including fifteen starts and thirteen in the final two years. He recorded 107 tackles with 14.5 sacks, 20.5 stops for losses, thirty-one quarterback pressures, two pass deflections, a forced fumble and a fumble recovery.

== Professional career ==
=== Jacksonville Jaguars ===
The Jacksonville Jaguars selected McCray 249th overall in the seventh round of the 2004 NFL draft. He played for the Jaguars for four seasons from 2004 to 2007. As a rookie, he played in all sixteen of the Jaguars' regular season games, made seven starts and recorded 25 tackles (18 solo) and 3.5 sacks. In 2005, he played in all 16 games for the second consecutive season with one start and collected 23 tackles (20 solo) along with 5.5 sacks. In 2006, he started 12 games and totaled 49 tackles (42 solo), 10 sacks and two forced fumbles. In 2007 McCray saw action in 14 games along the Jacksonville defensive line, making nine starts, and recorded 24 tackles, three sacks, batted down three passes and forced a fumble. He also started both postseason games and notched four tackles, a sack and a forced fumble, McCray had a sack and forced a fumble on Pittsburgh Steelers' quarterback Ben Roethlisberger that won the Jaguars the 2007 AFC wild card game.

=== New Orleans Saints ===
On March 2, 2008, McCray signed a five-year, $20 million contract with the New Orleans Saints. The contract included $5 million in guaranteed money. In 2008, he played in 16 games, made eight starts and had six sacks.

In 2009, McCray played in 16 games as a reserve, but he started in all three of the Saints' post-season games leading to the team's win in Super Bowl XLIV. In the first playoff game, against Arizona, after Cardinals quarterback Kurt Warner threw an interception, McCray made a hard, but legal, block that briefly put Warner out of the game; McCray's teammate Darren Sharper described McCray's play as "game-changing". The following week, McCray was fined $20,000 for illegal hits on Minnesota Vikings Quarterback Brett Favre in the 2010 NFC Championship game.

After a season with the New Orleans Saints McCray earned the name "Quarterback Killa."

McCray along with the rest of the New Orleans Saints visited President Obama at the White house, 2010 National Football League Super Bowl champions August 9, 2010 in Washington, DC.

McCray was released on June 21, 2010. He was re-signed to a one-year contract by the Saints on July 22, 2010. He was waived on September 3, 2010.

McCray dedicated his 2008 season to After School All-Stars, a national organization that provides comprehensive after school programs that are fun for kids and also keep them safe and help them succeed in school and life. With every sack that Bobby accumulates, he donates $1000 to the organization.

Featured in ESPN, McCray for volunteering at the LA Parks and Recreation Department. Also, featured in ESPN The Magazine NHL Preview Issue, October 2010, Louisiana Health & Fitness magazine, September 2009 and New Orleans Magazine

=== Philadelphia Eagles ===
McCray was signed by the Philadelphia Eagles on December 30, 2010.

== NFL career statistics ==
Legend
**Bold**	Career high

=== Regular season ===
Year	Team	Games		Tackles					Interceptions					Fumbles			
Year	Team	GP	GS	Cmb	Solo	Ast	Sck	TFL	Int	Yds	TD	Lng	PD	FF	FR	Yds	TD
2004	JAX	**16**	7	24	19	5	3.5	7	0	0	0	0	1	2	0	0	0
2005	JAX	**16**	1	17	13	4	5.5	6	0	0	0	0	1	**3**	**1**	0	0
2006	JAX	15	**12**	**35**	**30**	5	**10.0**	11	0	0	0	0	1	2	0	0	0
2007	JAX	14	9	17	10	**7**	3.0	3	0	0	0	0	**2**	1	0	0	0
2008	NOR	**16**	8	29	25	4	6.0	**12**	0	0	0	0	0	1	0	0	0
2009	NOR	**16**	0	12	8	4	1.5	3	0	0	0	0	1	0	0	0	0
2010	PHI	1	0	0	0	0	0.0	0	0	0	0	0	0	0	0	0	0
		94	37	134	105	29	29.5	42	0	0	0	0	6	9	1	0	0

=== Playoffs ===
Year	Team	Games		Tackles					Interceptions					Fumbles			
Year	Team	GP	GS	Cmb	Solo	Ast	Sck	TFL	Int	Yds	TD	Lng	PD	FF	FR	Yds	TD
2005	JAX	1	0	0	0	0	0.0	0	0	0	0	0	0	0	0	0	0
2007	JAX	2	2	3	3	0	**1.0**	**1**	0	0	0	0	0	**1**	0	0	0
2009	NOR	**3**	**3**	**6**	**6**	0	0.0	0	0	0	0	0	**1**	0	0	0	0
		6	5	9	9	0	1.0	1	0	0	0	0	1	1	0	0	0

== Post-retirement ==
McCray was featured in Sports and Entertainment Today for his culinary skills in the fall 2009. He was also on The Mag: Bobby McCray Jock Chef - by ESPN with two of his teammates Will Smith, Mike McKenzie, and McCray's mom.

McCray started Atlas Group Advisors in early 2015. Atlas is a high-profile consulting group for those whose lives are lived at a high-profile level: having a significant amount of fame, wealth, power, social status, or influence.

=== Filmography ===
McCray starred in Man v. Food Food Reality TV Series as himself in 2010. Super Bowl XLIV (2010) The AFC champion Indianapolis Colts and the NFC champion New Orleans Saints meet for the championship of the National Football League also starring Queen Latifah and Carrie Underwood

Additional TV/Film appearances include: The Mag: For Love or The Game Reggie Bush/Bobby McCray, The Brian McKnight Show, Rome Is Burning, Super Bowl XLIV, NFL Monday Night Football, 2004 NFL Draft, and The Central Park Five

== Personal life ==
McCray married Khadijah Haqq on July 17, 2010. McCray has four children including Bobby Louis McCray III born February 2004; Christian Louis McCray born November 2010; Celine Amelia McCray February 2014; Kapri Naomi McCray born January 2021

McCray was arrested in December 2009 for driving while intoxicated. McCray accused law enforcement of filing "bogus" charges. McCray was arrested and charged with reckless driving and drug possession in October 2006.

== See also ==
- List of Florida Gators in the NFL draft
- List of Houston Texans players
- List of New Orleans Saints players
- List of Philadelphia Eagles players
