= Miami Tropics (American football) =

- Founded: 2000
- Folded: 2000
- League: Spring Football League
- Based in: Miami, Florida
- Stadium: Miami Orange Bowl
- Head coach: Jim Jensen

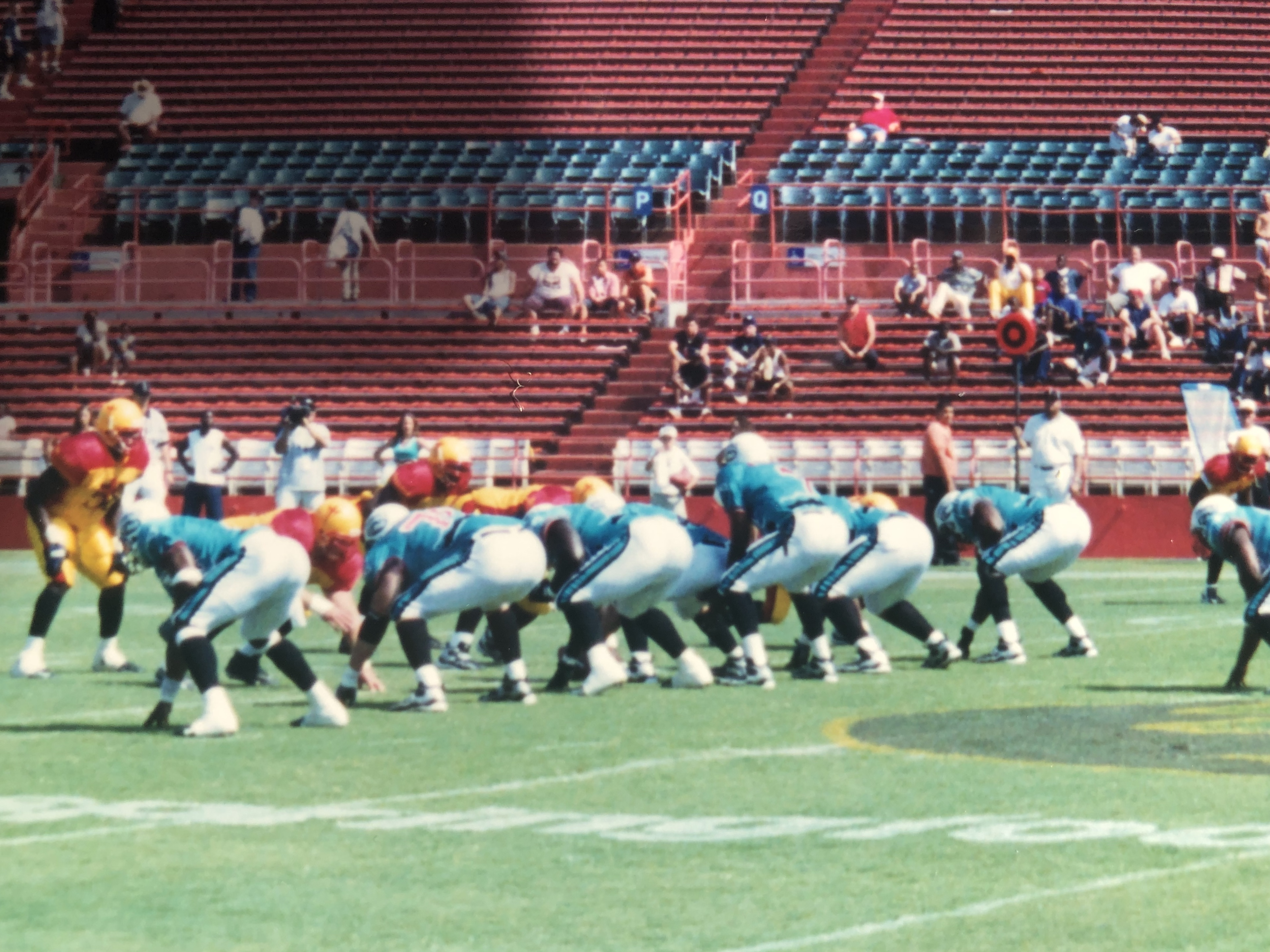
Miami Tropics vs San Antonio Matadors

The Miami Tropics were a professional American football team based in Miami, Florida, that played in the Spring Football League in 2000. The Tropics Head Coach was Jim Jensen, who played for the Miami Dolphins. The Tropics played their home games at the Miami Orange Bowl. The Tropics were the only team in the SFL that played in an NFL market at the time.

Tropics players of note:

- James Burgess- (Miami, San Diego Chargers)
- James Stewart - (Miami, Minnesota Vikings)
- Nakia Reddick - (Indianapolis Colts, Carolina Panthers)
- Harvey Wilson - (Indianapolis Colts)
- Antron Wright - (Baltimore Ravens)

The Tropics would play the very last professional football game at the Miami Orange Bowl.
