= Rashad Smith (American football) =

American football player (born 1997)

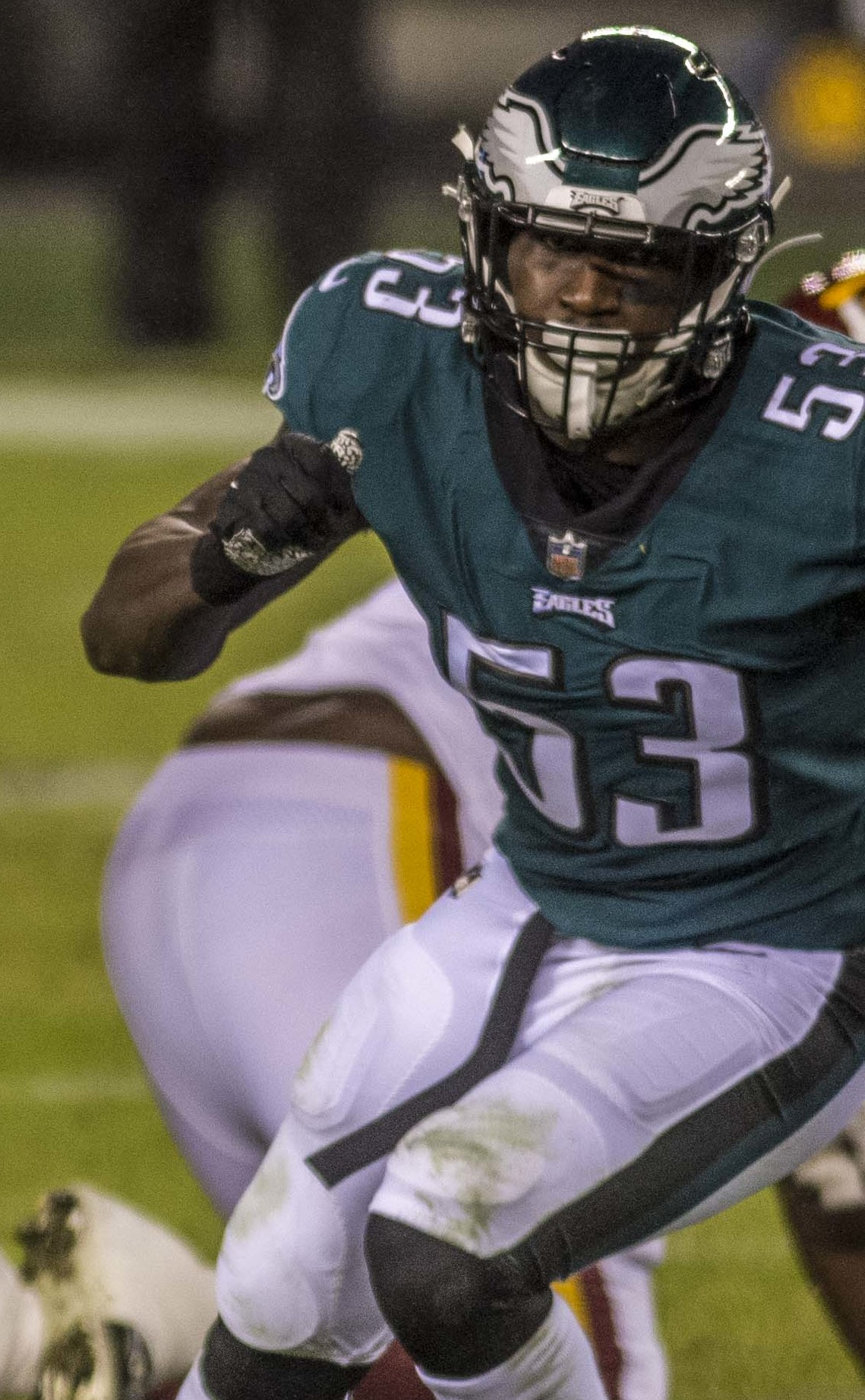
- Smith with the Philadelphia Eagles in 2021

No. 53
- Position: Linebacker

Personal information
- Born: April 20, 1997 (age 29); Florida City, Florida, U.S.
- Listed height: 6 ft 1 in (1.85 m)
- Listed weight: 220 lb (100 kg)

Career information
- High school: Homestead (Homestead, Florida)
- College: Florida Atlantic
- NFL draft: 2020: undrafted

Career history
- Chicago Bears (2020)*; Dallas Cowboys (2020); Philadelphia Eagles (2020); San Francisco 49ers (2021)*; Chicago Bears (2021)*; Atlanta Falcons (2021–2022)*; Birmingham Stallions (2023)
- * Offseason or practice squad member only

Awards and highlights
- USFL champion (2023)

Career NFL statistics
- Total tackles: 3
- Stats at Pro Football Reference

Rashad Smith (born April 20, 1997) is an American former professional football player who was a linebacker in the National Football League (NFL). He played college football for the Florida Atlantic Owls.

== Early life ==
Smith attended Homestead High School. As a junior, he had 6 fumble recoveries. As a senior, he appeared in 10 games, tallying 102 tackles, 8 sacks and 3 forced fumbles.

== College career ==
Smith accepted a football scholarship from the Florida Atlantic University. As a true freshman, he appeared in 11 games, compiling 22 tackles (2 for loss) and one sack. He had 5 solo tackles against Kansas State University. He started against the University of North Carolina at Charlotte and made 3 tackles.

As a sophomore, he appeared in 14 games, registering 99 tackles (12 for loss), 6 sacks, 4 quarterback hurries, 5 pass breakups and one forced fumble. He had 10 tackles (one for loss) against Navy. He started against the University at Buffalo, making 12 tackles and 2 passes defensed. He had 6 tackles, one sack, one quarterback hurry and 2 pass breakups against Old Dominion University. He made 10 tackles (one for loss) against Louisiana Tech University. He had 8 tackles, 3 sacks and one forced fumble against Florida International University.

As a junior, he appeared in 12 games, collecting 86 tackles (5.5 for loss), one sack, 4 interceptions, 2 quarterback hurries, one pass breakup and one fumble recovery. He had 9 tackles against University of Oklahoma. He made 16 (one for loss) and one interception against Air Force. He had 9 tackles, one sack and one quarterback hurry against No. 16 ranked University of Central Florida. He made 12 tackles (0.5 for loss) and one quarterback hurry against Marshall University.

As a senior, he appeared in 14 games, posting 109 tackles (11.5 for loss), 3.5 sacks, 4 quarterback hurries, 3 interceptions, 2 pass breakups, one forced fumble and 5 fumble recoveries (led the nation). He had 11 tackles and one fumble recovery against Ohio State University. He made 11 tackles, one fumble recovery (returned for a touchdown) and one interception against Southern Methodist University. He finished his college career with 51 games, 316 tackles (31 for loss), 11.5 sacks, 7 interceptions, 8 pass breakups and 2 forced fumbles.

== Professional career ==
=== Chicago Bears (first stint) ===
Smith was signed as an undrafted free agent by the Chicago Bears after the 2020 NFL draft on April 27. He was waived during final roster cuts on September 5, 2020, and signed to the practice squad the next day.

=== Dallas Cowboys ===
On September 15, 2020, the Dallas Cowboys signed Smith off the Bears' practice squad. He was declared inactive in the 6 games he spent on the active roster. He was waived on October 26.

=== Philadelphia Eagles ===
On November 2, 2020, Smith was signed to the Philadelphia Eagles' practice squad. He was elevated to the active roster on December 12 for the team's week 14 game against the New Orleans Saints, and reverted to the practice squad after the game. He was promoted to the active roster on January 1, 2021. He was waived on August 29, 2021.

=== San Francisco 49ers ===
On September 3, 2021, Smith was signed to the San Francisco 49ers practice squad. He was released on September 10, 2021.

=== Chicago Bears (second stint) ===
On September 23, 2021, Smith was signed to the Chicago Bears practice squad. He was released on October 5. He was re-signed to the practice squad on October 13. He was released again on December 7.

=== Atlanta Falcons ===
On December 14, 2021, Smith was signed to the Atlanta Falcons practice squad. He signed a reserve/future contract with the Falcons on January 10, 2022. He was released on August 16, 2022.

=== Birmingham Stallions ===
Smith signed with the Birmingham Stallions of the USFL on November 3, 2022. He was not part of the roster after the 2024 UFL dispersal draft on January 15, 2024.
