= James Burgess (gridiron football) =

American gridiron football player (born 1974)

No. 52, 51, 99
- Position: Linebacker

Personal information
- Born: March 31, 1974 (age 52); Miami, Florida, U.S.
- Listed height: 6 ft 0 in (1.83 m)
- Listed weight: 230 lb (104 kg)

Career information
- High school: Homestead (Homestead, Florida)
- College: Miami (FL) (1993–1996)
- NFL draft: 1997: undrafted

Career history
- Kansas City Chiefs (1997)*; Dallas Cowboys (1997)*; San Diego Chargers (1997–1998); Miami Tropics (2000); Orlando Rage (2001); Oakland Raiders (2001)*; Calgary Stampeders (2002)
- * Offseason or practice squad member only

Awards and highlights
- All-XFL (2001); First-team All-Big East (1996)

Career NFL statistics
- Total tackles: 16
- Stats at Pro Football Reference

James Paul Burgess (born March 31, 1974) is an American former professional football player who was a linebacker for two seasons with the San Diego Chargers of the National Football League (NFL). He played college football for the Miami Hurricanes. He was also a member of the Kansas City Chiefs, Dallas Cowboys, Miami Tropics, Orlando Rage, Oakland Raiders, and Calgary Stampeders.

== Early life ==
James Paul Burgess was born on March 31, 1974, in Miami, Florida. He played high school football at Homestead High School in Homestead, Florida. He totaled 118 tackles, 10 sacks, four interceptions, and 12 forced fumbles his senior year, earning first-team All-State honors. Burgess also wrestled for two years in high school and had a career record of 44–1 while also winning a state title in the 220 pound weight class.

== College career ==
Burgess was a four-year letterman for the Hurricanes of the University of Miami from 1993 to 1996. He played in ten games, starting one, his freshman year in 1993, recording 50 tackles and one sack. In June 1995, Miami head coach Butch Davis suspended Burgess for two games after an incident at a night club in which he was charged with "battery on a police officer" and "resisting arrest without violence". He was acquitted on September 16, 1995. He started nine games his senior season in 1996, totaling 109 tackles, one sack, one forced fumble, and three passes defended, garnering first team All-Big East recognition. Overall, Burgess played in 40 games, starting 26, during his college career, accumulating 161 solo tackles, 182 assisted tackles, three sacks, and 17 passes defended. He majored in liberal arts at Miami.

== Professional career ==
After going undrafted in the 1997 NFL draft, Burgess signed with the Kansas City Chiefs on April 25, 1997. He was released on August 19, 1997.

Burgess was signed to the practice squad of the Dallas Cowboys on August 28, 1997. On September 2, he was signed to the San Diego Chargers' active roster off of the Cowboys' practice squad. He played in 15 games, starting four, for the Chargers during the 1997 season, recording 13 solo tackles and one assisted tackle. Burgess appeared in all 16 games in 1998, posting one solo tackle and one assisted tackle. He was released on February 12, 1999.

Burgess was a member of the Miami Tropics of the Spring Football League in 2000.

In October 2000, Burgess was a territorial selection of the Orlando Rage in the 2001 XFL draft. He started all ten games for the Rage in 2001, totaling 57 tackles, three sacks, and one interception. The Rage finished the year with an 8–2 record and lost in the playoffs to the San Francisco Demons by a score of 26–25. He earned All-XFL honors for the 2001 season.

Burgess was signed by the Oakland Raiders on June 5, 2001, waived on August 28, signed again on August 31, and waived again on September 2, 2001.

Burgess played in ten games, all starts, for the Calgary Stampeders of the Canadian Football League in 2002, recording 26 defensive tackles, three special teams tackles, two sacks, one interception, and one pass breakup.

== Personal life ==
His son, James Burgess, played in the NFL from 2016 to 2021.
