= Herb Waters =

American gridiron football player (born 1992)

Profile
- Position: Cornerback / wide receiver

Personal information
- Born: November 10, 1992 (age 34); Florida City, Florida, U.S.
- Listed height: 6 ft 2 in (1.88 m)
- Listed weight: 194 lb (88 kg)

Career information
- High school: Homestead (Homestead, Florida)
- College: Miami (FL)
- NFL draft: 2016: undrafted

Career history
- Green Bay Packers (2016–2017); Pittsburgh Steelers (2018–2019)*; Tampa Bay Vipers (2020); Hamilton Tiger-Cats (2021)*; Carolina Cobras (2021); Edmonton Elks (2021); Montreal Alouettes (2022)*; Carolina Cobras (2022); Fayetteville Mustangs (2023); Carolina Cobras (2024)
- * Offseason or practice squad member only
- Stats at Pro Football Reference

Herbert Lewis Waters (born November 10, 1992) is an American professional football cornerback. He played college football as a wide receiver at the University of Miami. He was signed by the Green Bay Packers as an undrafted free agent in 2016.

== Early life ==
Playing on both sides of the ball as well as returning punts at Homestead High School, Waters had five punt return touchdowns, ten receiving touchdowns and two interceptions as a senior. He was a three-star recruit. He is also from homestead fl.

== College career ==
At the University of Miami, Waters started two games as a true freshman. That season, he had 10 catches for 227 yards and two touchdowns. After catching five touchdowns his sophomore year, Waters' reps took a bit of a downturn his junior year, but he bounced back during his senior year with career highs in catches (41) and yards (624). Waters was recorded as having a 4.50-second 40-yard dash and a 38.5-inch vertical jump.

Statistics
Year	Games		Receiving					Rushing				
Year	G	GS	Rec	Yds	Avg	Lng	TD	Att	Yds	Avg	Lng	TD
2012	12	2	10	227	22.7	87	2	1	−1	−1.0	−1	0
2013	12	4	28	406	14.5	54	5	2	58	29.0	63	1
2014	10	3	20	277	13.9	28	1	1	0	0.0	0	0
2015	13	11	41	624	15.2	46	1	2	11	5.5	10	0
Total	47	20	99	1,534	15.5	87	9	6	68	11.3	63	1
Source: HurricaneSports.com

== Professional career ==
=== Green Bay Packers ===
Waters was signed by the Green Bay Packers on May 2, 2016, as an undrafted free agent. He was released during final cuts on September 3, 2016, and was signed to the practice squad. Packers defensive backs coach Joe Whitt Jr. persuaded Waters to switch from wide receiver to cornerback as a result of three injuries at that position in the first two weeks of the season. He was promoted to the active roster on January 5, 2017. On August 3, 2017, Waters suffered a shoulder injury and was ruled out for the season.

Waters re-signed with the Packers on March 15, 2018. However, he was waived by the team on September 3.

=== Pittsburgh Steelers ===
On October 2, 2018, Waters was signed to the Pittsburgh Steelers' practice squad. He signed a reserve/future contract with the Steelers on January 1, 2019.

On August 1, 2019, Waters was waived/injured by the Steelers and placed on injured reserve. He was released on August 27.

=== Tampa Bay Vipers ===
Waters was drafted in the 8th round during phase four in the 2020 XFL draft by the Tampa Bay Vipers. He was waived on February 1, 2020, and re-signed on February 11, 2020. He had his contract terminated when the league suspended operations on April 10, 2020.

=== Hamilton Tiger-Cats ===
Waters signed with the Hamilton Tiger-Cats of the Canadian Football League (CFL )on December 28, 2020. He was released on June 28, 2021.

=== Carolina Cobras ===
In 2021, Waters signed with the Carolina Cobras of the National Arena League (NAL).

=== Edmonton Elks ===
On October 20, 2021, Waters signed with the Edmonton Elks. He played one game with the team.

=== Montreal Alouettes ===
On February 27, 2022, Waters signed with the Montreal Alouettes. He was released on July 17, 2022.

=== Carolina Cobras (second stint) ===
On June 8, 2022, Waters resigned with the Cobras.
