= Homestead Senior High School (Florida) =

Location
- 2351 Southeast 12th Avenue; Homestead, Florida 33034; United States; 25°26′55″N 80°27′35″W

Information
- Type: Public high school
- Established: September 1979; 46 years ago
- School district: Miami-Dade County Public Schools
- Teaching staff: 101.00 (FTE)
- Grades: 9–12
- Gender: Co-educational
- Enrollment: 2,247 (2023–2024)
- Student to teacher ratio: 22.25
- Campus: Suburban
- Colors: Navy Blue & Orange
- Mascot: Bronco
- Website: www.homesteadshs.net

Homestead Senior High School is a public high school located at 2351 SE 12 Avenue in Homestead, Florida. It is part of the Miami-Dade County Public Schools district.

Homestead is one of two high schools serving a community that includes most of Homestead, Florida City and Leisure City. The high school offers magnet programs, including the Academy of International Business, the Academy of Aviation/Aerospace, Academy of Travel and Tourism, an Environmental Horticulture Science and Services program, and a Health Science Education program (one of only three such programs in the state that lead to a Certification in Practical Nursing).

== History ==
In 1992 Homestead High School was severely damaged by Hurricane Andrew, forcing the school to delay opening for the 1992–1993 school year by two weeks. Most of the families in the surrounding community left after the hurricane, but a few stayed, living in tents, mobile homes, or shared accommodation in other parts of the county. Those students still living in the area were forced to attend other schools in the district, some of which were ten to fifteen miles away.

The damage done to Homestead High School was not significant enough for it to be demolished. Within a year of the disaster, Homestead High School and nearby South Dade High School (also damaged by Andrew) opened their doors to the still-devastated areas welcoming students whose families had not left the area. Since the hurricane, the racial, ethnic, and socioeconomic mix of the community and school has changed, mainly due to the building of low-income housing in the areas where middle-class homes were once located.

== Magnet Programs and Academies ==
Homestead High School has the following Magnet Programs and Academies:

- Nursing
- Hospitality and Tourism Management
- Veterinary Science
- Early Childhood Education
- Academy of Information Technology
- Building and Architecture Design Academy
- Culinary Arts
- Visual and Performing Arts
- JROTC Air Force
- Something

== Demographics ==
Homestead High School is 52% Hispanic, 43% Black, 4% White, and 1% Asian.

== Notable alumni ==
- Jose Baez, Defense attorney
- Micheal Barrow, NFL linebacker, Houston Oilers, Carolina Panthers, New York Giants
- Isaac Brown, college football running back
- John Brown, NFL wide receiver
- James Burgess, NFL linebacker
- James Burgess Jr., NFL linebacker
- Eric Foster, NFL defensive tackle
- Herbert Goodman, NFL running back and former mixed martial artist
- Charles Lee, NFL wide receiver
- Bobby McCray, NFL defensive end
- Willie Middlebrooks, NFL & CFL cornerback
- Bob Pifferini, NFL linebacker
- Rashad Smith, NFL linebacker
- Herb Waters, NFL & CFL cornerback
- Anthony Wint, NFL & CFL linebacker

== See also ==
- Education in the United States
