= Miami Orange Bowl =

Stadium in Florida, United States

- The Sea; Football Heaven; The Dock; The Old Horseshoe in Little Havana
- Aerial view from the west, c. 1976

- Location in the United States Location in Florida
- Former names: Burdine Stadium (1937–1949)
- Address: 1501 Northwest 3rd Street
- Location: Miami, Florida, U.S.
- Coordinates: 25.778°N 80.220°W
- Owner: City of Miami
- Operator: City of Miami
- Capacity: 72,319 (2003–2007) Former capacity: List: 23,330 (1937–1943); 35,030 (1944–1946); 59,578 (1947–1949); 64,552 (1950–1952); 67,129 (1953–1954); 76,062 (1955–1960); 72,880 (1961–1962); 70,097 (1963–1967); 80,010 (1968–1976); 80,045 (1977–1980); 75,500 (1981–1990); 74,712 (1991–1993); 74,476 (1994–2002); 72,319 (2003–2007)
- Type: Stadium
- Surface: Natural grass (1976–2008); PolyTurf (1970–1975); Natural grass (1937–1969)

Construction
- Groundbreaking: 1936
- Opened: December 10, 1937
- Expanded: 1944, 1947, 1950, 1953, 1955, 1968
- Closed: January 26, 2008; 18 years ago
- Demolished: March 3–May 14, 2008
- Cost: $340,000 ($7.61 million in 2025)

Tenants
- Miami Hurricanes (NCAA) (1937–2007); Orange Bowl (NCAA) (1938–1996, 1999); Miami Seahawks (AAFC) (1946); Miami Dolphins (AFL / NFL) (1966–1986); Miami Toros (NASL) (1973–1975); Miami Freedom (ASL / APSL) (1988–1992); Miami Tropics (SFL) (2000); FIU Panthers (NCAA) (2007); Miami FC (USL First Division) (2007)

The Miami Orange Bowl was an outdoor athletic stadium in Miami, Florida, from 1937 until 2008. The stadium was located in the Little Havana neighborhood west of downtown Miami. The venue was considered a landmark and served as the home of the Miami Hurricanes college football team from 1937 through 2007 and for the Miami Dolphins for the franchise's first 21 seasons, until Joe Robbie Stadium (now Hard Rock Stadium) opened at the nearby Miami Gardens in 1987. The stadium was also the temporary home for the FIU Golden Panthers for one year, in 2007, while its on-campus FIU Stadium underwent expansion.

Opened in 1937, it was originally known as Burdine Stadium. In 1949, it was renamed to the Orange Bowl for the Orange Bowl college football bowl game, which was played annually at the venue following every season from 1938 to 1996. The event was moved to Pro Player Stadium (now Hard Rock Stadium) beginning on December 31, 1996. In January 1999, it returned to the Orange Bowl for a final time due to a scheduling conflict. From 1956 to 1960, the Miami Marlins team of Minor League Baseball occasionally played games in the Orange Bowl.

The stadium was located on a large city block bound by Northwest 3rd Street to its south, Northwest 16th Avenue to its west, Northwest 6th Street to its north, and Northwest 14th Avenue to its east, which was an open end of the stadium.

The Orange Bowl was demolished in 2008. LoanDepot Park, the new home ballpark of the Miami Marlins of Major League Baseball, was built on the site. Construction began in July 2009, and the new stadium opened on March 5, 2012.

== History ==
=== Mid 20th century ===
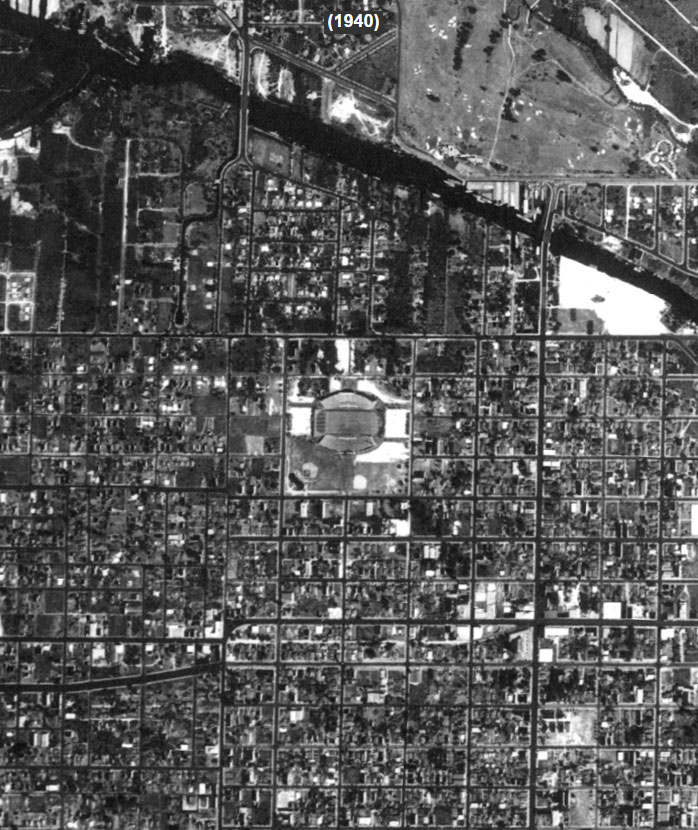
An aerial view of the stadium, then called Burdine Stadium, in 1940

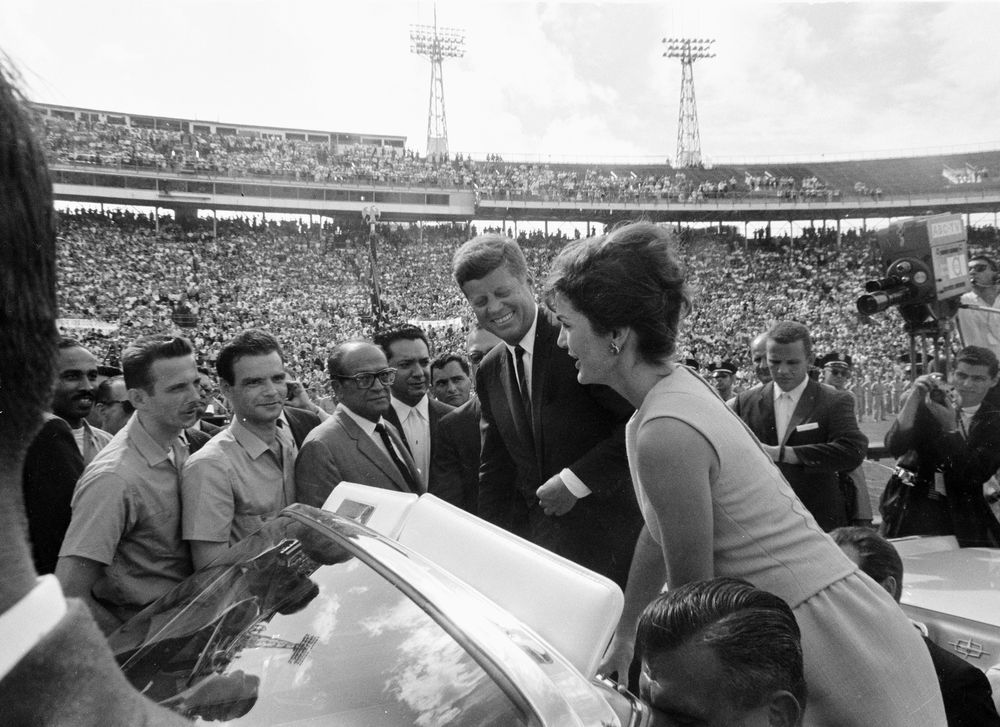
U.S. President John F. Kennedy and Mrs. Kennedy greet surviving members of Brigade 2506 at the Orange Bowl following the failed Bay of Pigs Invasion of Cuba on December 29, 1962

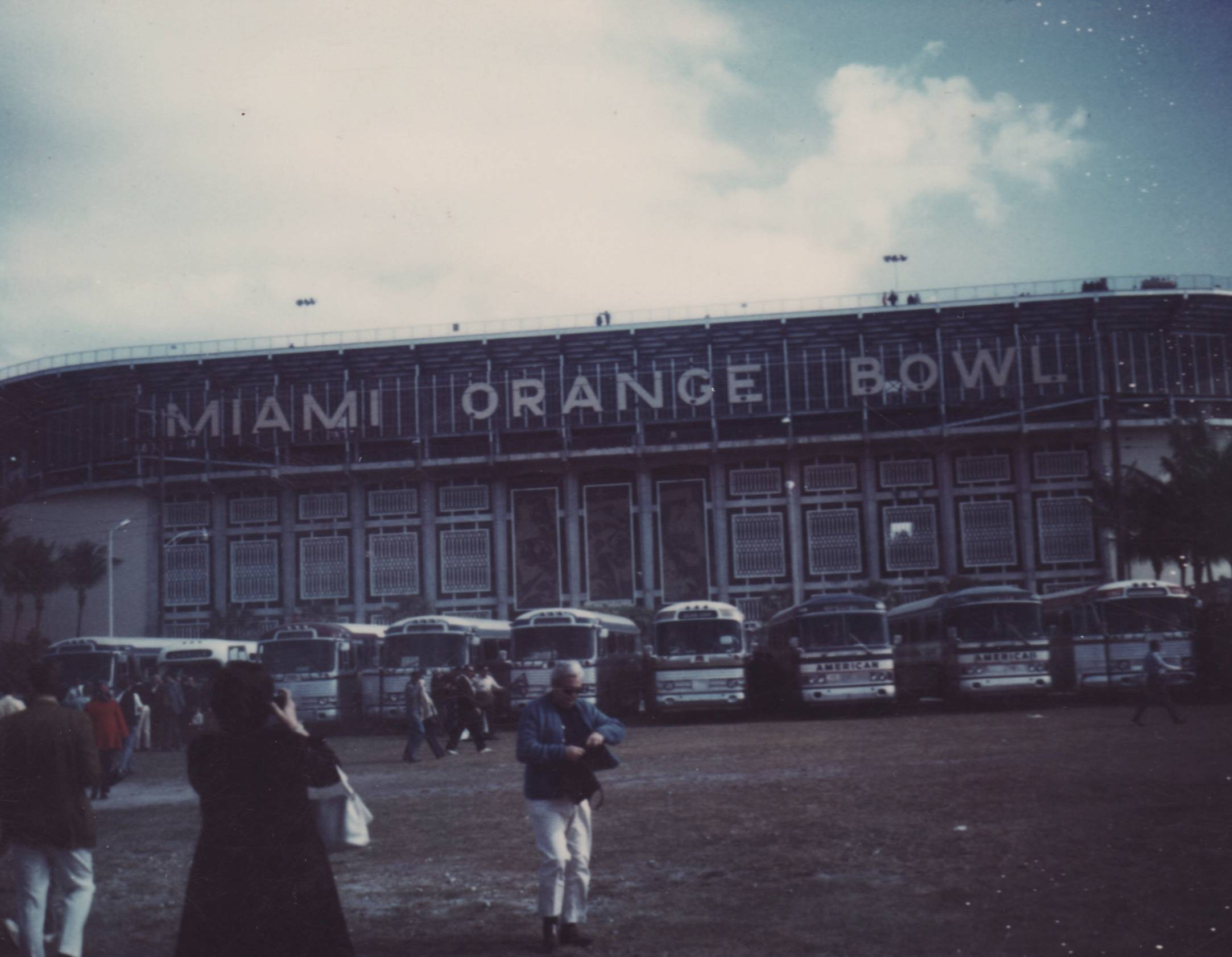
Super Bowl V on January 17, 1971, with the Baltimore Colts playing the Dallas Cowboys; the Colts won 16–13. The Miami Orange Bowl hosted five Super Bowls between 1968 and 1979. Super Bowl V was the first Super Bowl ever played on artificial turf.

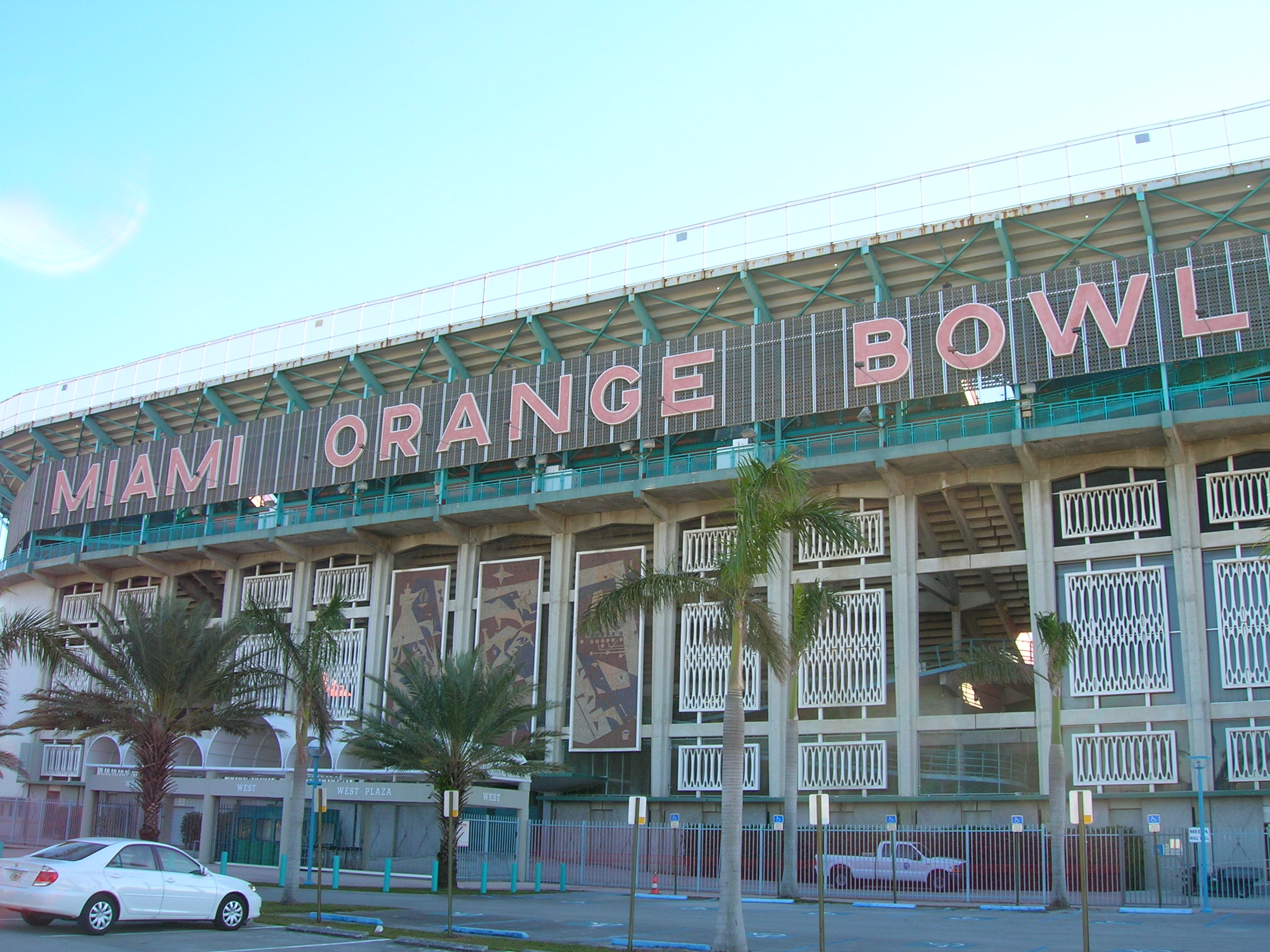
Outside the Miami Orange Bowl's west end zone in February 2006

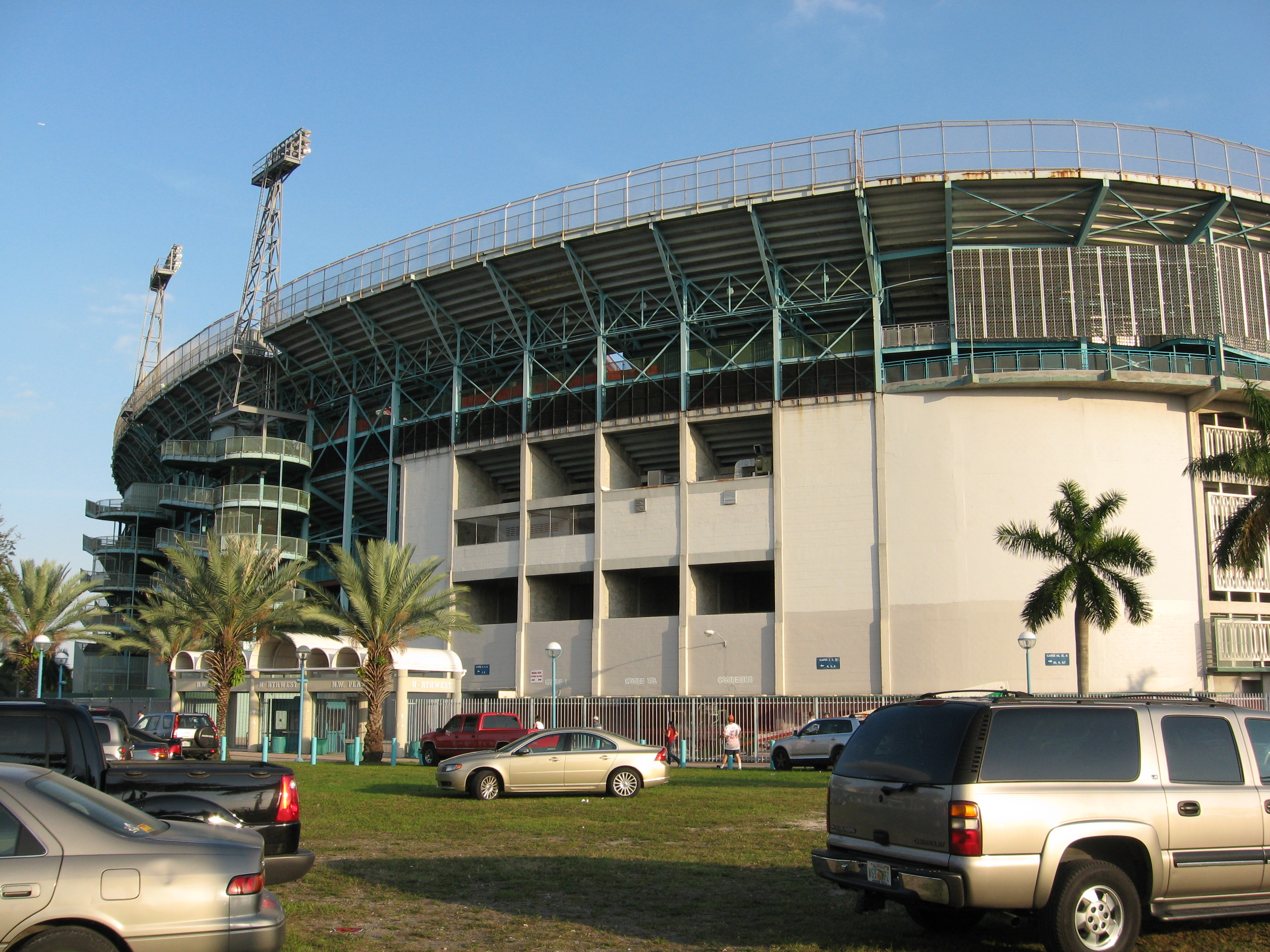
The Miami Orange Bowl's North Gate in January 2008

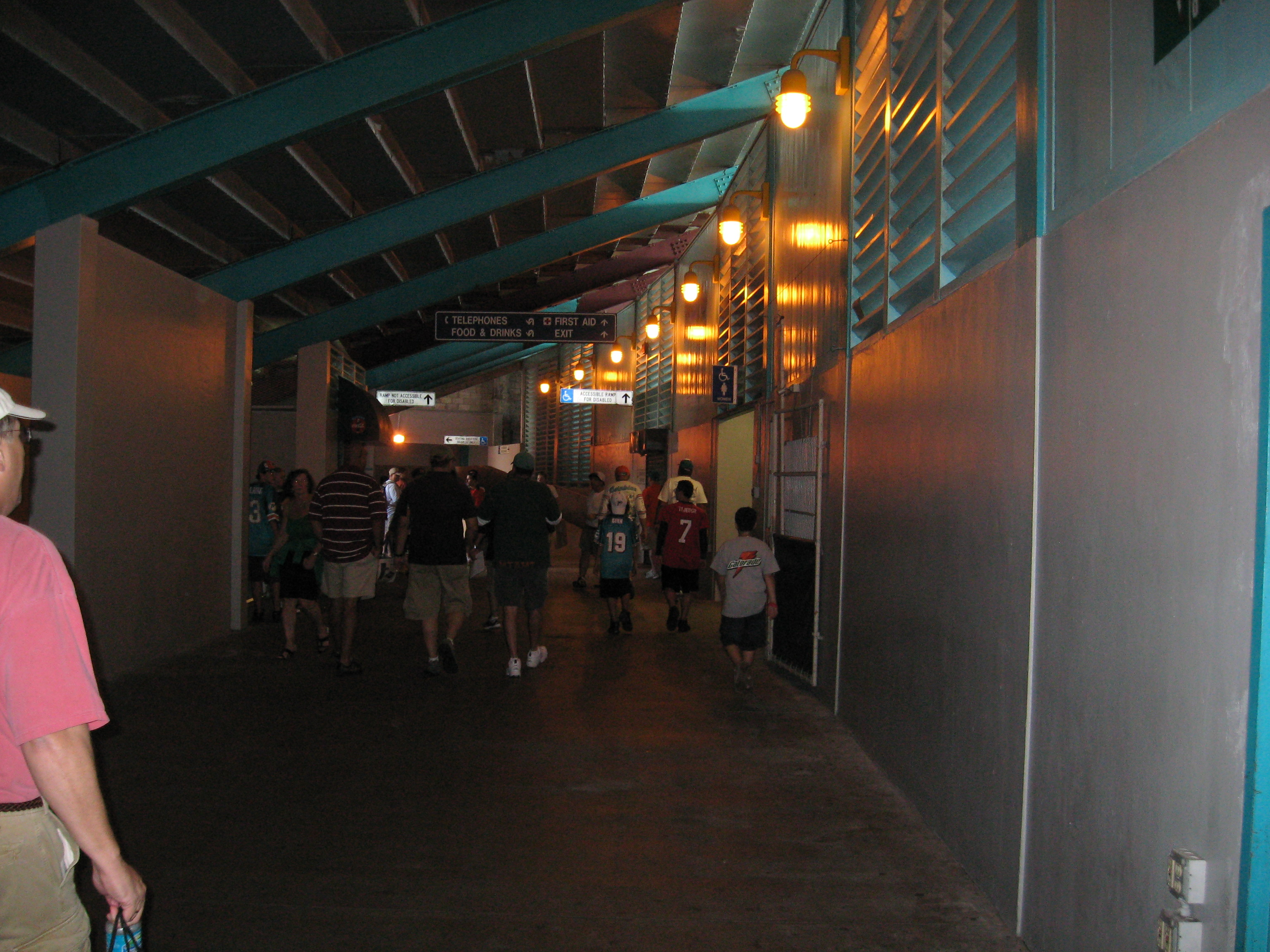
Walkway of the Orange Bowl in February 2008

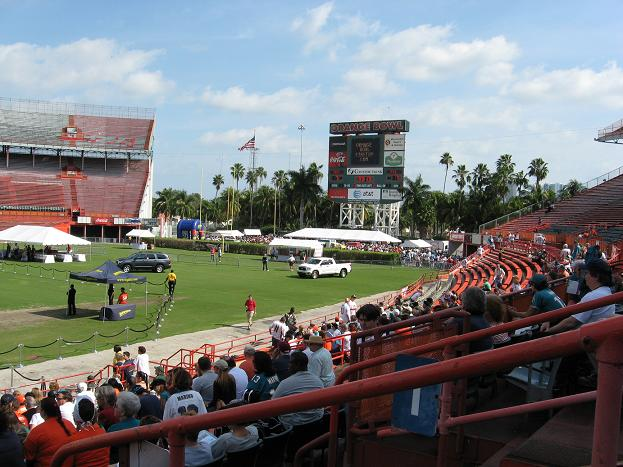
"Farewell to the Orange Bowl", a January 26, 2008 event held at the stadium prior to its demolition

The Miami Orange Bowl was initially called Burdine Stadium after Roddy Burdine, one of Miami's pioneers and the owner of the Burdines department store chain, and was built by the City of Miami Public Works Department. Construction began in 1936 and was completed in December 1937 and featured stadium lights. Prior to completion, the first game was a high school game on September 24, 1936, in which Miami Edison Senior High School shut out Ponce de Leon, 36–0. During this opening game, the stadium's new lighting system partially went out, leaving the mid-field dark with five minutes remaining in the fourth quarter.

The stadium opened for the Miami Hurricanes football program on December 10, 1937, in a 0 to 26 loss to the University of Georgia in the final game of the 1937 season. From 1926 to 1937, the University of Miami had played in a stadium near Tamiami Park and also at Moore Park until the Orange Bowl was built.

For a brief time in the late 1930s, the Orange Bowl was home to the headquarters of the International Baseball Federation.

The stadium originally seated 23,739 people along the sidelines, roughly corresponding to the lower level of the sideline seats in the stadium's final configuration. Attendance for its first Orange Bowl in January 1938 was under 19,000, but the following year saw over 32,000 in attendance. Seating was added in the end zones in the 1940s, and by the end of the 1950s the stadium was double-decked on the sidelines. In 1966, the AFL expansion Miami Dolphins played their first regular season game in the stadium on Friday, September 2. The west end zone upper deck section was then added in the 1960s, bringing the stadium to its peak capacity of 80,010. On January 1, 1965, the Orange Bowl was the first college bowl game to be televised in prime time.

=== Late 20th century ===
From 1966 to 1968, and again in the 1970s, a live dolphin named Flipper was situated in a water tank in the open (east) end of the Orange Bowl. He would jump in the tank to celebrate touchdowns and field goals. The tank that was set up in the 1970s was manufactured by Evan Bush and maintained during the games by Bush and Dene Whitaker. Flipper was removed from the Orange Bowl after 1968 to save costs and the 1970s due to stress. In the film Ace Ventura: Pet Detective, Snowflake, a live dolphin who does special behaviors after the Dolphins score a touchdown, was the basis of the film after he is kidnapped as part of a revenge plot against Dan Marino.

In 1977, the permanent seats in the east end zone were removed, and further upgrades brought the stadium to its final capacity and design. The city skyline was visible to the east through the open end, over the modern scoreboard and palm trees. The surface was natural grass, except for six seasons in the 1970s. Poly-Turf, an artificial turf similar to AstroTurf, was installed for the 1970 football season. It was removed and replaced with a type of natural grass known as "Prescription Athletic Turf" after Super Bowl X in January 1976.

In 1980, the stadium was used as a holding facility for Cuban refugees, who arrived in South Florida during the Mariel Boatlift.

Under the leadership of Hall of Fame head coach Don Shula, the Miami Dolphins enjoyed a winning record in the Orange Bowl against rival teams in the AFC Eastern Division. Under Shula, the Dolphins were an impressive 57–9–1 (60–10–1 including playoff contests) against the Baltimore/Indianapolis Colts (15–3), the Boston/New England Patriots (15–1), the Buffalo Bills (16–1) and the New York Jets (13–4–1). They have also beaten every visiting franchise at least once, enjoying perfect records against 11 of them. The playoff results against AFC East opponents are: AFC Championship games: (1971, Miami 21, Baltimore 0); (1982, Miami 14, New York Jets 0) and (1985, New England 31, Miami 14) and AFC First round game (1982 strike shortened season, Miami 28, New England 13).

Notable winning streaks during the Shula-era in the Orange Bowl include a 13–0 streak against the Buffalo Bills and a 15–0 streak against the New England Patriots, Also of note, the Miami Dolphins enjoyed a record 31-game home winning streak from 1971–75, which includes four playoff wins and the perfect season of 1972. The Dolphins have not enjoyed the same level of success at Hard Rock Stadium. While much of this lack of success at Hard Rock Stadium is obviously attributable to a diminished level of talent and organizational stability, it is also widely recognized that the homefield advantage that the Dolphins enjoyed in the Orange Bowl was much greater than in their newer home. This was in great part due to the atmosphere of the Orange Bowl. The closeness of the seats to the field, along with the closed West End Zone, metal bleachers, and steel structure (and of course the team's success and its status as Miami's only professional sports team for so many years), made the Bowl one of the loudest and most electric stadiums in the NFL. Visiting team quarterbacks often complained to referees or were forced to call time out as their teammates could not hear them barking out the signals due to the unbearable noise, especially when the Dolphins were making a goal-line stand in the closed West End Zone. While Hard Rock Stadium is much newer and cleaner and is considered one of the top facilities in the NFL, with top-notch amenities, the seats are set further back from the field than comparable seats at the Orange Bowl. As a result, even at its loudest, Hard Rock Stadium is nowhere near as loud as the Orange Bowl.

The Orange Bowl was also the site of the NCAA's longest college football home field winning streak. Between 1985 and 1994, the Miami Hurricanes won 58 straight home games at the Bowl, until ended by the Washington Huskies. The stadium's home field advantage used to include a steel structure that fans would set to rumbling by stomping their feet. Concrete reinforcement had silenced the rumble in the stadium's later years. There was still the advantage of the West End Zone, which had a relatively narrow radius that amplified fan noise. The West End Zone was a factor in the Wide Right curse, in which the Florida State Seminoles lost a series of close games due to missed field goals. This section was so raucous that some football announcers often confused it with the student section.

In addition to football, the stadium also hosted concerts and other public events. The stadium had a regular capacity of 74,476 orange seats, and could seat up to 82,000 for concerts and other events where additional seating would have been placed on the playing field.

The last professional football game to be played in the Orange Bowl took place on April 29, 2000, and matched the Miami Tropics against the San Antonio Matadors of the short-lived Spring Football League. The Matadors won 16–13.

Date	Super Bowl	Team (Visitor)	Points	Team (Home)	Points	Spectators
January 14, 1968	II	Green Bay Packers	33	Oakland Raiders	14	75,546
January 12, 1969	III	New York Jets	16	Baltimore Colts	7	75,389
January 17, 1971	V	Baltimore Colts	16	Dallas Cowboys	13	79,204
January 18, 1976	X	Dallas Cowboys	17	Pittsburgh Steelers	21	80,187
January 21, 1979	XIII	Pittsburgh Steelers	35	Dallas Cowboys	31	79,484

=== College football ===
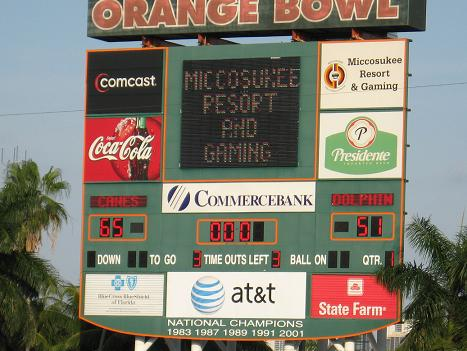
The Miami Orange Bowl's scoreboard following the final game played at the stadium, a January 2008 flag football game between the Miami Dolphins and Miami Hurricanes

The City of Miami embarked on a plan to extensively renovate the stadium. However, those plans fell by the wayside as Miami focused on keeping the Florida Marlins in town, forcing the Hurricanes to threaten a move to Dolphin Stadium (now Hard Rock Stadium) in suburban Miami Gardens if a plan to renovate the stadium was not in place within 45 days. Some feared that Miami would permit the college to leave, only to tear down the Orange Bowl and replace it with the new stadium for the Marlins.

That fear became reality as Paul Dee, athletic director for the University of Miami, announced that the Hurricanes would be moving to Dolphin Stadium for the 2008 season. Dee and university president Donna Shalala made the announcement during a press conference at the Hecht Athletic Center on August 21, 2007. The university agreed to a 25-year contract to play at then Dolphin Stadium. According to Miami City Manager Pete Hernandez, this put the Orange Bowl back in the forefront as a possible site for a new Marlins stadium. The hope that talks would resume soon on that possibility vanished after only a short while.

Many Hurricane fans vocally opposed the decision to move stadium locations and preferred maintaining the Orange Bowl as the Hurricanes' home field, out of concern of Dolphin Stadium's extra distance from campus, the severing of an icon of the Hurricanes' historical successes on the field, and potentially more expensive parking costs.

Many fans stated to various broadcast, print and internet-based media outlets that they would no longer attend the games of Hurricanes football once the team abandoned the Orange Bowl. Some speculated that the decision to leave the Orange Bowl might have cursed the Miami Hurricanes and would cite the Miami Dolphins as a precedent. Indeed, a common explanation for the Miami Hurricanes' poor performance during the 2007 season was that "they've never been the same since they left the Orange Bowl." The University of Miami lost their final Orange Bowl game to Virginia, 48–0, in a nationally televised ESPN game. It was the most lopsided home shutout loss in the Miami program's history until Clemson beat Miami 58–0 in 2015.

The last home game of college football in the Orange Bowl was a home win for the FIU Golden Panthers against North Texas. FIU had been using the Orange Bowl as home field for the season due to renovations to their home stadium. Miami and FIU had engaged in a bench clearing brawl at the Orange Bowl the previous year during the first of two scheduled games between the two schools.

=== Motorcycle fatality ===
On February 8, 1997, the Miami Orange Bowl was host to a U.S. Hot Rod Monster Jam. As part of the show, motorcycle stunt rider Corey Scott attempted a stunt that required him to drive up a ramp and land into a net hoisted into the air. Scott missed the net, bounced out, and fell 70 feet (21 m) to the ground below. He later died at Jackson Memorial Hospital. The event was witnessed by a crowd of around 30,000 spectators.

=== Hurricane Wilma ===
In October 2005, Hurricane Wilma caused structural damage to the stadium, which rekindled discussion of tearing down the aging facility. The damage was subsequently repaired after the 2005 college football season. The stadium served as a FEMA relief center in the hurricane's aftermath.

=== Final year and demolition ===
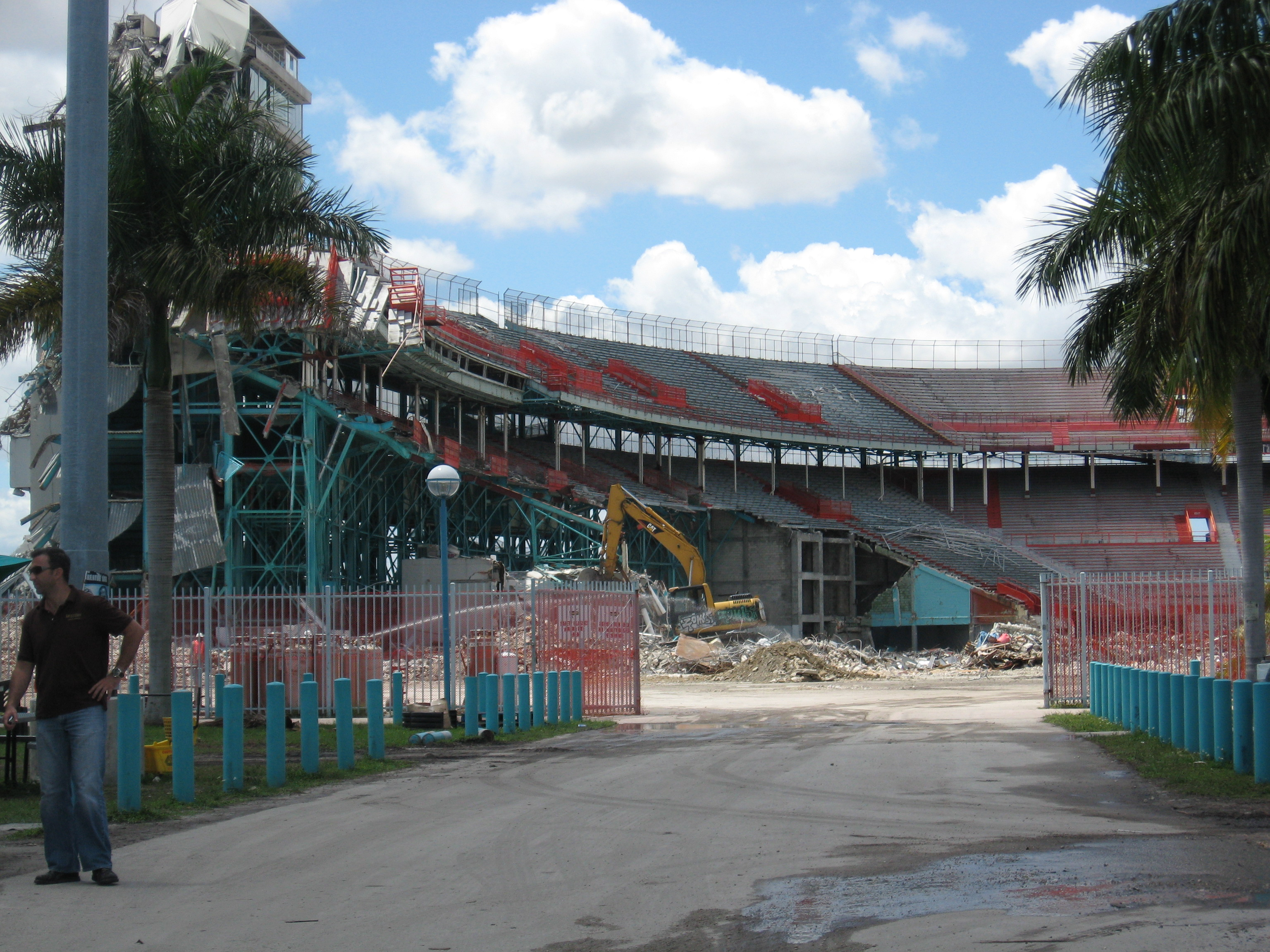
The stadium's demolition in April 2008

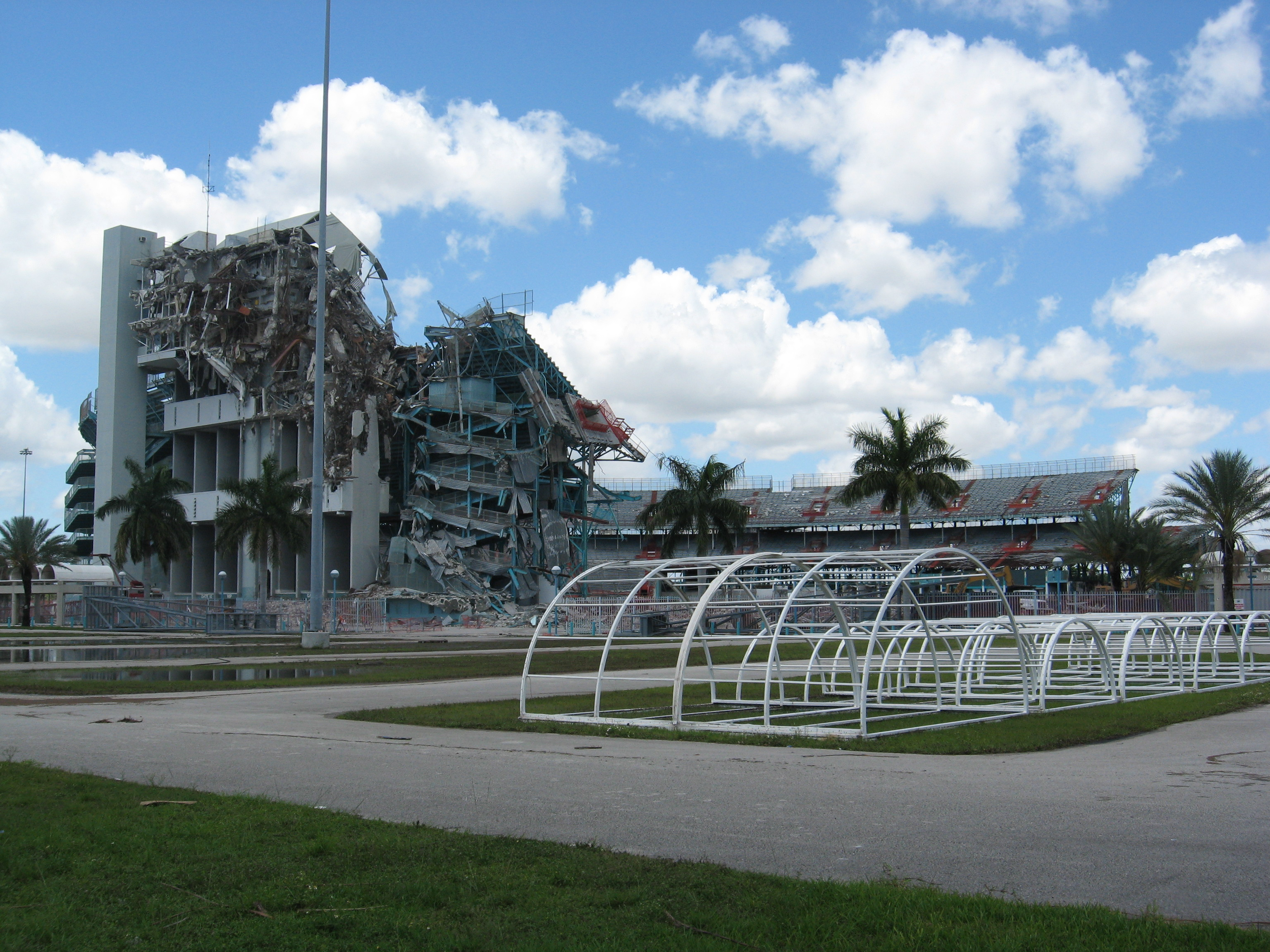
Demolition of the Miami Orange Bowl's press box on April 8, 2008

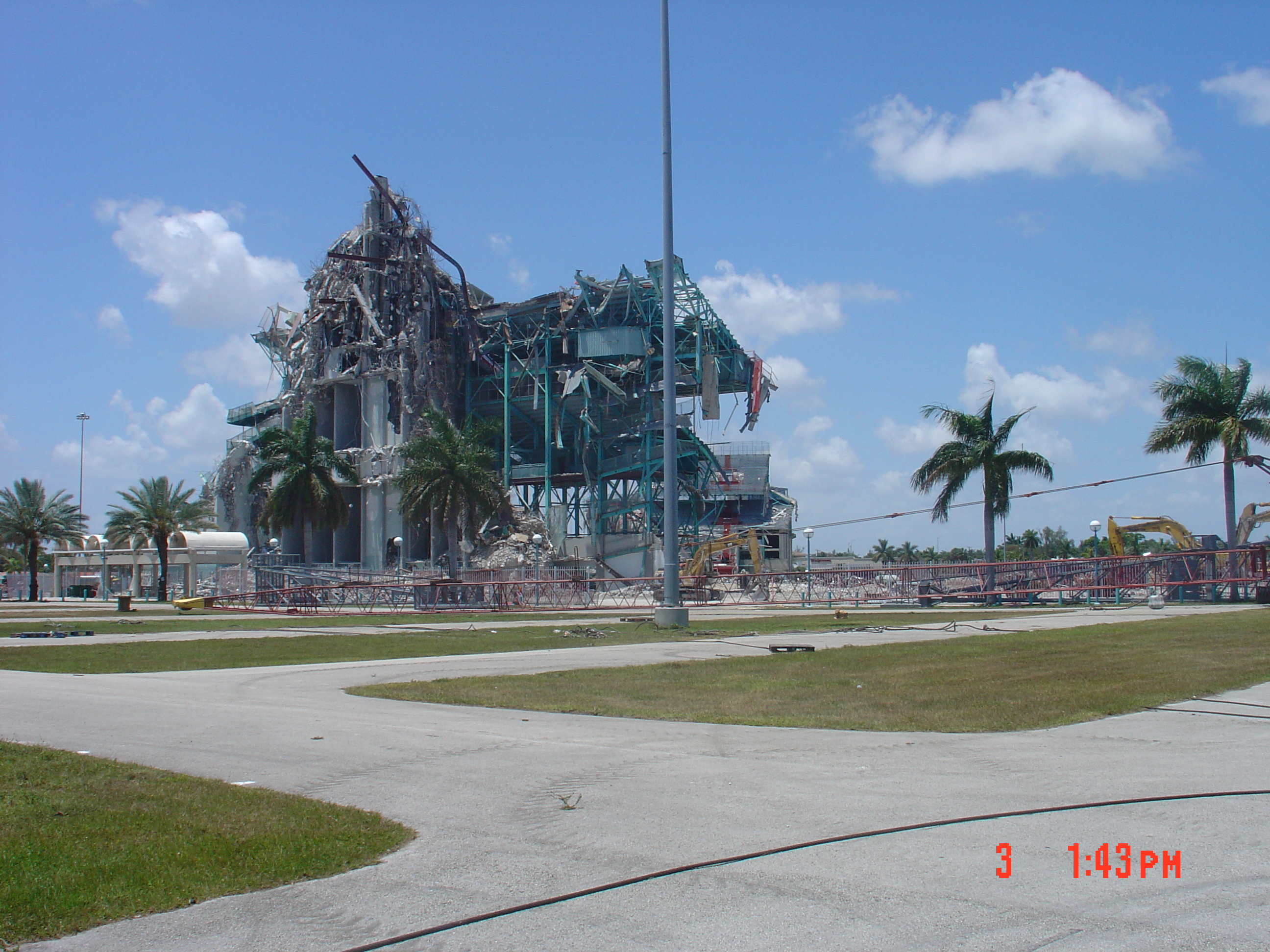
The Miami Orange Bowl during the final days of the stadium's demolition, which began March 3, 2008 and was completed May 14, 2008

The Orange Bowl was demolished in May 2008, and LoanDepot Park is now on the site. Despite some protests, the historic stadium had been earmarked for demolition when the University of Miami announced that they were moving out of the Orange Bowl after the 2007 season to begin play at Sun Life Stadium in 2008 in a 25-year deal. On November 10, 2007, the University of Miami Hurricanes lost their final game at the Orange Bowl when the Virginia Cavaliers defeated Miami 48–0 in the Hurricanes' second worst home shutout loss in school history.

The FIU Golden Panthers (now Panthers) won their last game at the Orange Bowl against the North Texas Mean Green on December 1, 2007, by a score of 38–19, snapping a 23-game losing streak that many attributed to the consequences of suspensions following the UM-FIU brawl the year before. Since the Golden Panthers had been using the Orange Bowl as their home field during the construction of FIU Stadium, this win allowed the FIU team to boast that it was they who officially closed the Orange Bowl's college football career with a home win.

A high school all-star game, "The Offense-Defense All-American Bowl", took place on January 4, 2008, and was the last game before the closing events.

On Saturday, January 26, 2008, a "Farewell to the Orange Bowl Stadium" flag football game was held. The game featured former Dolphin and Hall of Fame quarterback Dan Marino, plus Mark Duper, Mercury Morris, Dwight Stephenson, A. J. Duhe, Don Strock, Jim Kiick, John Offerdahl, Jim Kelly, Bernie Kosar, Melvin Bratton, Brian Blades, Bennie Blades and Eddie Brown. The NFL's winningest coach Don Shula coached the Dolphins while Florida Atlantic University and former Hurricanes coach and former Dolphins assistant Howard Schnellenberger coached the University of Miami.

The Orange Bowl was open to the public for the last time February 8–10, 2008 when a public auction of stadium artifacts and memorabilia was held. The stadium was stripped and pieces were sold by a company called Mounted Memories. Demolition of the Orange Bowl began on March 3, 2008, and was completed on May 14, 2008.

The Orange Bowl is one of eight stadiums that are no longer standing that have hosted a Super Bowl. The other seven are: Tulane Stadium (hosted three Super Bowls; demolished in 1980), Tampa Stadium (hosted two Super Bowls; demolished in 1999), Stanford Stadium (hosted one Super Bowl; demolished and redeveloped in 2006), the Hubert H. Humphrey Metrodome (hosted one Super Bowl; demolished in 2014), the Georgia Dome (hosted two Super Bowls; demolished in 2017), the Pontiac Silverdome (hosted one Super Bowl; demolished in 2018), and San Diego Stadium (hosted three Super Bowls; demolished in 2021).

== Commemorative marker ==
As part of the new Marlins Park, the home field of the Miami Marlins of Major League Baseball, Miami-Dade County Art in Public Places commissioned Daniel Arsham and Snarkitecture to design a public art work to commemorate the Miami Orange Bowl. Their project uses the letters from the original "Miami Orange Bowl" sign as the basis for the 10-foot-tall (3.0 m) orange concrete letters rearranged across the east plaza of the new ballpark so that they form new words as visitors move around them.

== Stadium events ==
=== Football ===
- Miami Hurricanes – home stadium from 1937 to 2007
- Orange Bowl game 1938–1995, 1999
- Miami Seahawks – home stadium in 1946
- North–South Shrine Game – college football all-stars – 1948–1973
- Playoff Bowl (NFL) – game for 3rd place – (1961–70)
- Miami Dolphins – home stadium from 1966 to 1986
- 1975 NFL Pro Bowl Game
- 1976 Miami Palmetto HS vs Coral Gables HS Game - longest game in high school football history, kicked off 9/11/76 and ended 11/8/76
- 1995 CFL exhibition game – Birmingham Barracudas vs. Baltimore Stallions
- Miami Tropics – home stadium in 2000 Spring Football League
- FIU Golden Panthers – 2007 home games due to FIU Stadium renovations

==== Super Bowls ====
The Orange Bowl hosted five Super Bowls:

- Super Bowl II – Green Bay Packers 33, Oakland Raiders 14
- Super Bowl III – New York Jets 16, Baltimore Colts 7
  - (Super Bowls II and III are the only two Super Bowls to be played in back-to-back years in the same stadium)
- Super Bowl V – Baltimore Colts 16, Dallas Cowboys 13
  - (first Super Bowl played on artificial turf)
- Super Bowl X – Pittsburgh Steelers 21, Dallas Cowboys 17
  - (last game in Orange Bowl played on artificial turf)
- Super Bowl XIII – Pittsburgh Steelers 35, Dallas Cowboys 31

=== Baseball ===
- Miami Marlins – An estimated 57,000 fans watched 50-year-old Satchel Paige pitch there for the Marlins on August 7, 1956. On that occasion, the diamond was tucked into the southeast corner of the stadium, with a high temporary fence in front of the right field seating area. The minor league Marlins played occasional other games there between 1956 and 1960.
- 1990 Caribbean Series – The 20th edition of the second stage of the Caribbean Series was held at the Orange Bowl, which had not hosted baseball in decades. Many considered the series a botched experiment, especially since the stadium, by 1990, was ill-suited for baseball. Only about 50,000 fans attended during the seven-day Series, which featured teams from the Dominican Republic, Venezuela, Mexico, and Puerto Rico. The Leones del Escogido of the Dominican League won the title, led by manager Felipe Rojas Alou and series MVP Gerónimo Berroa.

==== Miami Field ====
Tatum Park in 1916

Tucked into the northeast corner of 16th Avenue and Third Street, a ball field called Tatum Park was built in time for spring training in 1916. The park was used for spring training games for six seasons, but with no new tenants booked, it was abandoned and demolished in December 1921.

Miami Field in 1924

In 1924, new seating was built on the site, and this facility was called Miami Field. It resumed being a site for spring training and other local events, including a revived Florida East Coast League minor league club. It served as the home field for University of Miami baseball from 1940 through 1965. Both the old and the new fields had a small covered seating area at 16th and Third.

As the Orange Bowl was developed and then expanded over time, it encroached somewhat on that small ballpark to its southwest. The ballpark's center field fence ran along the periphery of the stadium's outer concourse, and the right field fence bordered a driveway that led up to the big stadium.

There was also a softball field to the east across the driveway. During football season, the baseball and softball fields were both used for parking. In December 1965, Miami Field's seating area was demolished, and the land occupied by the two fields was reconfigured into full-time parking areas. The Hurricanes played elsewhere for a few years, and then opened Alex Rodriguez Park at Mark Light Field in 1973.

Miami Field can be seen in the 1940 aerial photo File:Miami-Orange-Bowl-1940.jpg. It also appears often in old aerial view postcards of the big stadium.

=== Soccer ===
- The United States men's national soccer team played 19 international matches from 1984 to 2004. The team had a 2–10–7 record at the venue, the worst record in all stadiums in the country.
- NASL Miami Gatos (1972) / Miami Toros (1973–1976)
- ASL Miami Americans (1976–1980), Miami Sharks / Miami Freedom (1988–1992)
- Marlboro Cup (1987–1988)
- Final of the 1990 Recopa Sudamericana Boca Juniors 1 Atlético Nacional 0
- Millennium Cup: Rangers (Glasgow) 2-2 (extra time: 3–4) Atlético (Belo Horizonte) (Jan 17, 1999)
- Miami Fusion defeated Columbus Crew in Major League Soccer play 4-3 in 2001
- USL-1 Team Miami FC played 2 games in 2007 at the Orange Bowl.
- Various friendly and pre-season matches with A.C. Milan, Real Madrid, Manchester United and Brazil national football team
- 1996 Summer Olympics football preliminaries.
- FIFA World Cup 2002 CONCACAF Qualifiers Play-off, Costa Rica vs. Guatemala (5–2, January 6, 2001)
- River Plate 2–1 Boca Juniors, June 15, 2002
- CONCACAF Gold Cup
- 1996 Summer Olympics – soccer games
- Boca Juniors 2 Haiti 0
- Mexico 3 Peru 1
- The stadium was used by the Haiti national team for their "home" matches, due to violent flare-ups in Haiti resulting from political instability.

=== Popular boxing bouts ===
- Archie Moore defeated Joey Maxim by UD 15 rounds on 1/27/1954
- Roberto Durán defeated Jimmy Batten by UD 10 rounds on 11/12/1982
- Aaron Pryor defeated Alexis Argüello by TKO 14 out of 15 on 11/12/1982

=== Non-athletic events ===
- Monster Jam
- Enchanted Dreamz Hip-Hop Car Show Bash
- World Championships of Senior Citizen Dancing, 1984
- Drum Corps International World Championships, August 1983

==== Concerts ====
Date	Performer(s)	Opening act(s)	Tour/Event	Attendance	Notes
July 7, 1974	The Eagles	The Band, The Gap Band	On the Border		
August 17, 1974	The Allman Brothers	Bachman–Turner Overdrive, Wet Willie			
August 24, 1974	Deep Purple	Elf, The J. Geils Band	Burn		
October 13, 1981	The Beach Boys				
March 21, 1982	Foreigner	UFO, Bryan Adams	4		
October 29, 1982	Jimmy Buffett				
October 28, 1983	The Police	Eric Burdon & The Animals, The Fixx	Synchronicity Tour		
November 2-3, 1984	The Jacksons				
April 7, 1985	Prince	Sheila E	Purple Rain Tour		The venue was temporarily renamed the Purple Bowl for this concert
September 9-10, 1985	Bruce Springsteen		Born in the U.S.A. Tour		
March 1, 1987	Genesis				
June 27, 1987	Madonna	Level 42	Who's That Girl World Tour		
September 18, 1987	David Bowie		Glass Spider Tour		
November 1, 1987	Pink Floyd		A Momentary Lapse of Reason Tour	55,000	
December 3, 1987	U2	Los Lobos, Buckwheat Zydeco	The Joshua Tree Tour		
January 12, 1988	The Beach Boys				
June 4, 1988	Van Halen	Scorpions, Metallica, Dokken, Kingdom Come	Monsters of Rock		
October 29, 1988	George Michael	The Bangles	Faith World Tour		
November 15-16, 1989	The Rolling Stones	Living Colour	Steel Wheels Tour		
July 24, 1994	The Eagles	Melissa Etheridge	Hell Freezes Over		
April 30, 1997	Santana				
April 30, 1997	The Rolling Stones	Dave Matthews Band, The Smashing Pumpkins, Third Eye Blind	Bridges to Babylon Tour		
December 28, 1999	Metallica	Creed, Kid Rock, Sevendust	M2K Tour		

=== Professional wrestling ===
- 1987 NWA The Great American Bash supercard

=== In popular culture ===
- The Orange Bowl was a central location in the 1977 film Black Sunday. A significant portion of the filming was done during Super Bowl X on January 18, 1976.
- Two episodes of Spike TV's Pros vs. Joes third season series were filmed here. Those episodes were the South Regional playoffs.
- Much of the on-field scenes for the 1994 comedy Ace Ventura: Pet Detective were filmed at the Orange Bowl.
- The stadium's role during the Mariel boatlift in 1980 is featured in the 1995 film The Perez Family.
- A scene from the 1980 film sequel Smokey and the Bandit II was shot on the field at the Orange Bowl, and included cameo appearances by Terry Bradshaw and "Mean" Joe Greene of the Pittsburgh Steelers.
- In the video game Driv3r, Tanner, the main character, can enter the ground and the stands of the Miami Orange Bowl, where he finds an enemy to be dealt with.
- A few scenes from Miami Vice were shot there in 1988 ("Indian Wars") and 1989 ("Hard Knocks").
- The Orange Bowl was a location in the 1977 film Crime Busters with Bud Spencer and Terence Hill.
- The Orange Bowl was a location in the 1980 film Super Fuzz with Ernest Borgnine and Terence Hill.
- The Orange Bowl served as the home of the fictional Miami Sharks in the 1999 Oliver Stone film Any Given Sunday, with several football scenes being filmed there.

Events and tenants
Preceded by Miami Field; Hard Rock Stadium	Home of the Orange Bowl; 1938–1995; 1999	Succeeded by Hard Rock Stadium; Hard Rock Stadium
Preceded by none	Home of the Miami Dolphins; 1966–1986	Succeeded by Hard Rock Stadium
Preceded by Los Angeles Memorial Coliseum; Tulane Stadium; Tulane Stadium; Louisiana Superdome	Host of the Super Bowl; II 1968 – III 1969; V 1971; X 1976; XIII 1979	Succeeded by Tulane Stadium; Tulane Stadium; Rose Bowl; Rose Bowl
Preceded by Arrowhead Stadium	Host of the NFL Pro Bowl; 1975	Succeeded by Louisiana Superdome
Preceded by FIU Stadium	Home of the FIU Golden Panthers; 2007	Succeeded by FIU Stadium
Preceded by Olympic Stadium (Montreal)	Host of Drum Corps International; World Championship; 1983	Succeeded by Grant Field
Preceded by Memorial Stadium; Three Rivers Stadium; Riverfront Stadium; Los Angeles Memorial Coliseum	Host of AFC Championship Game; 1972; 1974; 1983; 1985–1986	Succeeded by Three Rivers Stadium; Oakland Coliseum; Los Angeles Memorial Coliseum; Cleveland Municipal Stadium
Preceded by Ralph Korte Stadium	Host of the College Cup; 1971–1973	Succeeded by Busch Memorial Stadium
