= Eric Foster (American football) =

American football player (born 1985)

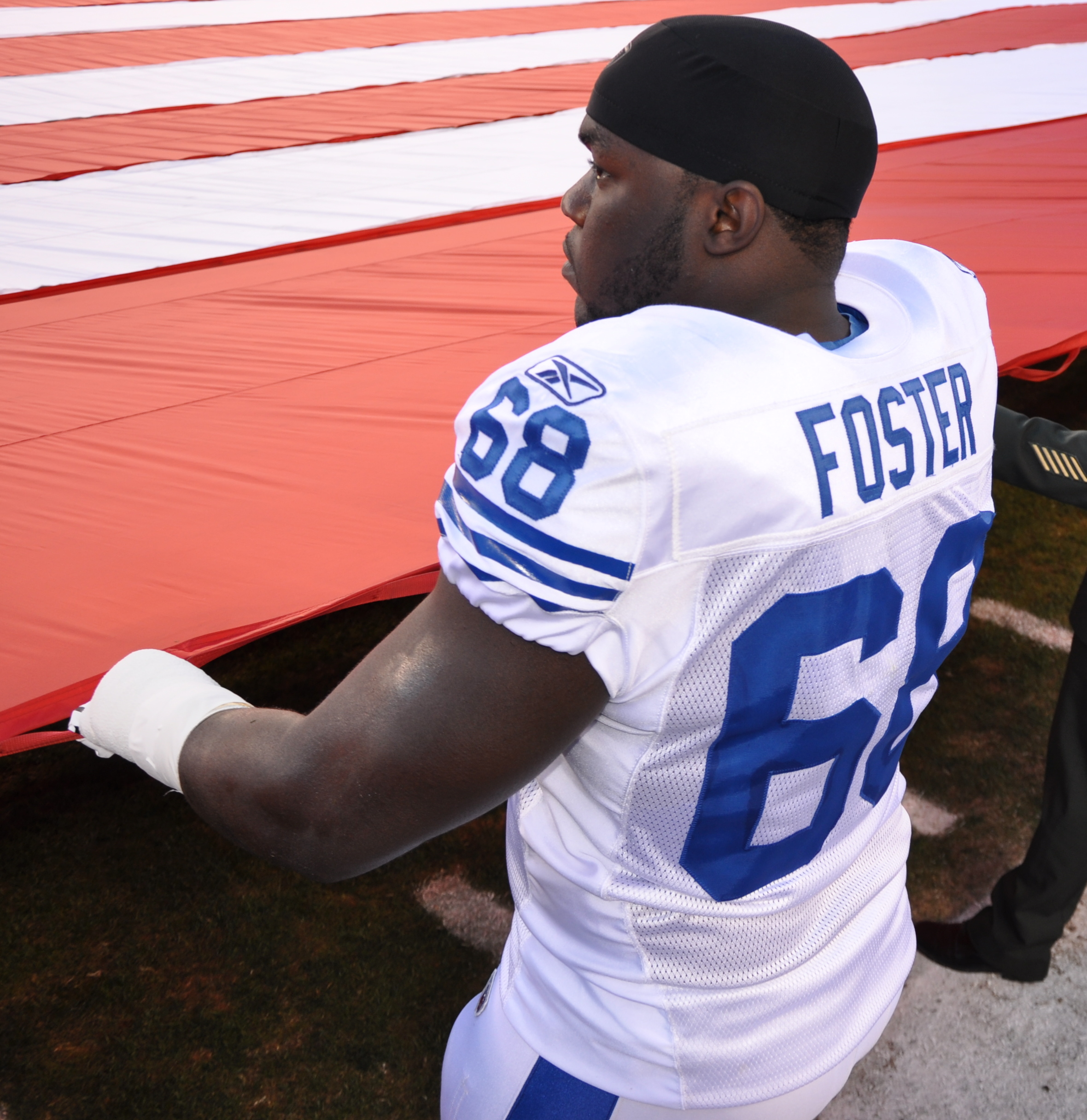
- Foster with the Indianapolis Colts in 2010

No. 68, 93
- Position: Defensive tackle

Personal information
- Born: April 5, 1985 (age 41); Homestead, Florida, U.S.
- Listed height: 6 ft 2 in (1.88 m)
- Listed weight: 265 lb (120 kg)

Career information
- High school: Homestead
- College: Rutgers
- NFL draft: 2008: undrafted

Career history
- Indianapolis Colts (2008−2011); Las Vegas Locomotives (2012); Toronto Argonauts (2013)*; Chicago Bears (2013)*
- * Offseason or practice squad member only

Awards and highlights
- First-team All-American (2006); First-team All-Big East (2006)

Career NFL statistics
- Total tackles: 117
- Sacks: 6
- Forced fumbles: 1
- Pass deflections: 4
- Stats at Pro Football Reference

Eric Jerome Foster (born March 5, 1985) is an American former professional football player who was a defensive tackle in the National Football League (NFL). He went undrafted in the 2008 NFL draft. Foster signed a contract with the Indianapolis Colts as an undrafted free agent. He played college football for the Rutgers Scarlet Knights.

== Early life ==
Foster was named All-Dade at linebacker by The Miami Herald following his senior year at Homestead High School where he led the team to a 9–4 season and the regional final in state playoffs.

== College career ==
After redshirting in 2003, Foster made an immediate impact in 2004 as a backup defensive end, playing in all 11 games. Foster was injured during the second game of the 2005 season, only to return in 2006 as the team's starting defensive tackle, lining up to Ramel Meekins. Despite the unit's lack of size, Foster's six sacks helped Rutgers register forty-one sacks total in 2006, good for fifth in all of Division I-A, as well as fourth in total defense.

Foster gained national notoriety in 2006 for his stellar play, as well as for a popular clip aired by ESPN of a locker room speech. Snippets of the video were played at later home games. In addition, he makes a chopping motion with his arms and hands as a reference to his coach, Greg Schiano's motto, "Keep Choppin'."

For his efforts, Foster was named first-team all-Big East Conference. The Football Writers Association of America named him as a first-team All-American at defensive tackle, as well as making Honorable Mention on the AP's team. In 2007, he was named a preseason All-American by Sports Illustrated.

Foster was named to several pre-season All-America teams for 2007 at DT. He was named to the preseason watch list for the Lott Trophy, annually awarded to the best defensive player in the nation.

== Professional career ==
=== Indianapolis Colts ===
After going undrafted, Foster was signed as a free agent for the Indianapolis Colts on May 2, 2008. Foster played in 13 games during his first season starting 11 of them.

During the Colts Monday Night Football game against the Buccaneers on October 3, 2011, Foster suffered a serious leg injury. During the final minutes of the first half, teammate Tyler Brayton rolled on Foster's ankle, causing his foot to turn painfully the wrong direction. His ankle was dislocated in the process. He was brought to Tampa General Hospital, where he underwent surgery the following day to repair the bone. Foster missed the rest of the 2011–12 season. The incident was compared to Joe Theismann's career-ending injury.

=== Las Vegas Locomotives ===
Foster played for the Las Vegas Locomotives of the United Football League in 2012, posting 0.5 sacks and two tackles.

=== Toronto Argonauts ===
On June 7, 2013, Foster was signed by the Toronto Argonauts of the Canadian Football League.

=== Chicago Bears ===
On August 17, 2013, Foster was signed by the Chicago Bears. He was released on August 25.
