= 1983 Philadelphia Stars season =

Defunct football team in the USFL

- Owner: Myles Tanenbaum
- General manager: Carl Peterson
- Head coach: Jim Mora
- Home stadium: Veterans Stadium

Results
- Record: 15–3
- Division place: 1st Atlantic Division
- Playoffs: Won Divisional Playoffs (vs. Blitz) 44-38 (OT); Lost USFL Championship (vs. Panthers) 22-24

The 1983 season was the inaugural season for the Philadelphia Stars in the United States Football League. The Stars were led by head coach Jim Mora and finished with a 15–3 record en route to the USFL championship.

On May 11, 1982, the announcement of the USFL was officially made by league owner and antique dealer, David Dixon. The league's Philadelphia team would be owned by real estate developer Myles H. Tanenbaum. He had originally wanted to name the team the Stallions in honor of Rocky Balboa, who was nicknamed "The Italian Stallion." However, when the Birmingham entry snapped up the Stallions name, Tanenbaum settled on "Stars." George Perles was originally named as the team's head coach in July 1982. Perles, previously an assistant coach for the NFL's Pittsburgh Steelers, never coached a game for the Stars, opting to take the head coach position for Michigan State instead. On January 15, 1983, the Stars hired Jim Mora to be their head coach.

The Stars began in Philadelphia in the USFL's inaugural 1983 season and played their home games at Veterans Stadium (the "Vet"). They compiled the league's best regular season record of 15–3 (.833), and advanced to the 1983 USFL championship game. Their "Doghouse Defense" allowed only 204 points in an 18-game season—the least in the history of the league. The Stars were led by fourth-year quarterback Chuck Fusina (1978 Heisman Trophy runner-up), fifth-year wide receiver Scott Fitzkee, rookie halfback Kelvin Bryant of North Carolina, rookie offensive tackle Irv Eatman of UCLA, rookie linebacker Sam Mills, and second-year safety Scott Woerner. The team also featured Towson's all-star rookie punter Sean Landeta. At the conclusion of the regular season, Bryant was named the USFL's Player of the Year by the Associated Press.

The Stars entered the playoffs as the top-seeded team. In the Semi-Finals, the Stars defeated the preseason favorites to win the 1983 title—George Allen's Chicago Blitz—by withstanding seven turnovers and erasing a 21-point deficit in the fourth quarter to win 44–38 in overtime. In the league title game at Denver's Mile High Stadium on July 17, the Stars lost to Jim Stanley's Michigan Panthers, 24–22. Just as they had against the Blitz, the Stars opened the game sluggishly, but finished with a flourish, after allowing the Panthers to carry a 17–3 lead into the fourth quarter. Many observers of the time believed that the Stars, Panthers and Blitz were almost NFL-quality units.

One of the few blemishes on the Stars' first season was the box office. They only attracted 18,650 fans per game. In addition to bad weather, there were lingering memories of a gate-papering scandal involving the World Football League's Philadelphia Bell in 1974. The Bell had claimed that a total of over 120,000 fans had attended their first two games, but it subsequently emerged that all but 19,000 of the tickets had been given away for free or for significantly reduced prices.

== Personnel ==
=== Staff ===
1983 Philadelphia Stars staff
Front office: Owner – Myles Tanenbaum; General manager – Carl Peterson; Head coaches: Head coach – Jim Mora; Offensive coaches: Offensive Coordinator - Joe Pendry; Quarterbacks – Joe Pendry; Running backs – Jim Skipper; Wide receivers – Joe Pendry; Tight ends – Carl Smith; Offensive line – Jim Erkenbeck	Defensive coaches: Defensive Coordinator - Vince Tobin; Defensive line – John Pease; Linebackers – Bill Kuharich; Defensive backs – John Rosenberg; Special teams coaches: Special teams coordinator – Carl Smith

=== Roster ===
1983 Philadelphia Stars roster
Quarterbacks (QB): 14 Chuck Fusina; 11 Jim Krohn; Running backs (RB): 33 Anthony Anderson; 44 Kelvin Bryant; 22 Allen Harvin; 35 David Riley; 34 Jeff Rodenberger; 32 Booker Russell; Wide receivers (WR): 86 Willie Collier; 87 Tom Donovan; 81 Scott Fitzkee; 83 Rodney Parker; Tight ends (TE): 80 Ken Dunek; 89 Steve Folsom	Offensive linemen (OL): 65 Scott Burris G; 69 Chuck Commiskey G; 75 Irv Eatman T; 61 Rich Garza G; 55 Joe Happe C/G; 50 Bart Oates C; 70 Brad Oates T; Defensive linemen (DL): 99 John Alford NT; 95 Frank Case DE; 96 Don Fielder DE; 91 Buddy Moor NT/DE; 94 Dave Opfar NT; 76 Willie Rosborough DE/NT	Linebackers (LB): 53 Jon Brooks OLB; 59 John Bunting OLB; 56 George Cooper OLB; 52 Vince DeMarinis OLB; 57 Jeff Gabrielson ILB; 51 Glenn Howard ILB; 54 Sam Mills ILB; Defensive backs (DB): 48 Kevin Donnalley CB; 23 Antonio Gibson CB; 24 Roger Jackson CB; 27 Mike Lush FS; 20 Mark McCants FS/SS; 26 Jon Sutton CB; 25 Scott Woerner SS; Special teams (ST): 7 Sean Landeta P; 1 David Trout K	Practice squad: 66 Brad Anae DE/DT; 58 Rick Donaldson LB; 63 George Gilbert G; 21 Hugh Jernigan CB; 85 Al Kimichik TE; 10 Steve Pisarkiewicz QB; Rookies in italics

== USFL draft ==
Round	Pick	Player	Position	School
1	7	Irv Eatman	Offensive Tackle	UCLA
2	17	Bart Oates	Center	BYU
3	32	Greg Hill	Defensive Back	Oklahoma State
4	41	Antonio Gibson	Defensive Back	Cincinnati
5	56	Allen Harvin	Running Back	Cincinnati
6	65	Tony Caldwell	Linebacker	Washington
7	80	Jimmy Turner	Defensive Back	UCLA
8	89	Richard Dent	Defensive End	Tennessee State
8	93	Rich Kraynak	Linebacker	Pittsburgh
9	104	James Caver	Wide Receiver	Missouri
10	113	Don Dow	Offensive Tackle	Washington
11	128	Gary Worthy	Running Back	Wilmington
12	137	Allama Matthews	Tight End	Vanderbilt
13	152	John Walker	DefensiveTackle	Nebraska-Omaha
14	161	Sean Landeta	Punter	Towson

== Schedule ==
Week	Date	Opponent	Result	Record	Venue	Attendance
1	March 6	at Denver Gold	W 13–7	1–0	Mile High Stadium	45,102
2	March 13	New Jersey Generals	W 25–0	2–0	Veterans Stadium	38,205
3	March 21	at Birmingham Stallions	W 17–10	3–0	Legion Field	12,850
4	March 27	Tampa Bay Bandits	L 22–27	3–1	Veterans Stadium	18,718
5	April 3	Washington Federals	W 34–3	4–1	Veterans Stadium	14,576
6	April 10	at Los Angeles Express	W 17–3	5–1	Los Angeles Memorial Coliseum	18,671
7	April 16	at Oakland Invaders	W 17–7	6–1	Oakland-Alameda County Coliseum	34,901
8	April 24	Boston Breakers	W 23–16	7-1	Veterans Stadium	10,257
9	April 30	at Tampa Bay Bandits	W 24–10	8–1	Tampa Stadium	41,559
10	May 8	Denver Gold	W 6–3	9–1	Veterans Stadium	14,306
11	May 15	Chicago Blitz	W 31–24	10–1	Veterans Stadium	25,251
12	May 22	at Arizona Wranglers	W 24–7	11–1	Sun Devil Stadium	18,151
13	May 29	at Boston Breakers	L 17–21	11–2	Nickerson Field	15,668
14	June 5	Michigan Panthers	W 29–20	12–2	Veterans Stadium	19,727
15	June 12	at New Jersey Generals	W 23–9	13–2	Giants Stadium	32,521
16	June 20	Oakland Invaders	W 12–6	14–2	Veterans Stadium	16,933
17	June 26	Birmingham Stallions	W 31–10	15–2	Veterans Stadium	17,973
18	July 3	at Washington Federals	L 14–21	15–3	RFK Stadium	11,039

=== Playoff schedule ===
Round	Date	Opponent	Result	Record	Location
Divisional Playoffs	July 9	Chicago Blitz	W 44–38 (OT)	1–0	Veterans Stadium
USFL Championship	July 17	Michigan Panthers	L 22–24	1–1	Mile High Stadium

== Standings ==
USFL Atlantic Division
	W	L	T	PCT	DIV	PF	PA	STK
Philadelphia Stars	15	3	0	.833	4–2	379	204	L1
Boston Breakers	11	7	0	.611	5–1	399	334	W1
New Jersey Generals	6	12	0	.333	2–4	314	437	L1
Washington Federals	4	14	0	.222	1–5	297	422	W2

== Awards ==
Award	Winner	Position
All-USFL Team	Irv Eatman	OT
All-USFL Team	Kelvin Bryant	RB
All-USFL Team	Sam Mills	LB
All-USFL Team	Scott Woerner	S
AP USFL Most Valuable Player	Kelvin Bryant	RB
Leading Scorer Award	David Trout	K
USFL Executive of the Year (TSN)	Carl Peterson	GM

== Final statistics ==
=== Offense ===
Stars Passing
	C/ATT	Yds	TD	INT
Chuck Fusina	238/421	2718	15	10
Jim Krohn	19/36	249	1	0
Steve Pisarkiewicz	6/15	69	0	0
Allen Harvin	1/3	44	0	0
Stars Rushing
	Car	Yds	TD	LG
Kelvin Bryant	318	1442	16	45
Allen Harvin	139	681	7	49
Chuck Fusina	63	291	3	18
Booker Russell	46	225	0	23
David Riley	31	139	0	19
Anthony Anderson	9	41	0	12
Jeff Rodenberger	12	40	1	10
Jim Krohn	6	2	0	12
Steve Pisarkiewicz	1	0	0	0
Chuck Commiskey	1	–3	0	–3
Sean Landeta	1	–5	0	–5
Stars Receiving
	Rec	Yds	TD	LG
Scott Fitzkee	55	731	3	44
Kelvin Bryant	53	410	1	50
Willie Collier	41	771	4	52
Steve Folsom	26	286	1	45
Booker Russell	17	163	2	39
Tom Donovan	15	219	3	21
Rodney Parker	13	203	0	29
Allen Harvin	13	144	1	23
Dave Riley	10	61	0	15
Ken Dunek	8	74	0	23
Al Kimichik	1	7	0	7
Jeff Rodenberger	1	7	0	7
Anthony Anderson	1	4	0	4

=== Defense ===
Stars Sacks
	Sacks
Don Fielder	8.5
Willie Rosborough	5.0
Sam Mills	3.5
John Bunting	2.5
Scott Woerner	2.0
Dave Opfar	2.0
Brad Anae	2.0
Jon Brooks	2.0
Buddy Moor	1.5
Frank Case	1.5
Glenn Howard	1.0
Antonio Gibson	1.0
George Cooper	0.5
Jon Sutton	0.5
Jeff Gabrielson	0.5

Stars Interceptions
	Int	Yds	TD	LG	PD
Scott Woerner	8	50	0	22	
Mike Lush	6	52	0	33	
Jon Sutton	4	53	0	31	
Sam Mills	3	13	0	10	
Antonio Gibson	3	0	0	0	
Jon Brooks	2	15	0	15	
Roger Jackson	2	9	0	9	
Glenn Howard	2	0	0	0	
Vince DeMarinis	1	16	0	16	
Willie Rosborough	1	11	0	11	
John Bunting	1	0	0	0	

Stars Fumbles
	FF	Fmb	FR	Yds	TD
Chuck Fusina		15	7	0	0
Jim Krohn		7	3	0	0
Kelvin Bryant		4	2	0	0
Dave Riley		3	1	0	0
Scott Woerner		3	6	16	0
Allen Harvin		2	1	0	0
Steve Pisarkiewicz		2	1	0	0
Sean Landeta		1	1	0	0
Steve Folsom		1	0	0	0
Rodney Parker		1	0	0	0
Cleo Montgomery		1	0	0	0
Booker Russell		1	1	0	0
Jon Sutton		1	4	0	0

=== Special teams ===
Stars Kicking
	FGM–FGA	XPM–XPA
David Trout	28-42	37-40

Stars Punting
	Pnt	Yds	Lng	Blck
Sean Landeta	86	3601	72	1

Stars Kick Returns
	Ret	Yds	TD	Lng
Allen Harvin	31	723	0	67
Booker Russell	5	63	0	22
Jeff Rodenberger	3	42	0	16
Dave Riley	2	36	0	19
Mark McCants	1	17	0	17
Ken Dunek	1	7	0	7
Jon Sutton	1	0	0	0

Stars Punt Returns
	Ret	Yds	TD	Lng
Scott Woerner	43	360	0	20
