= 1978 Penn State Nittany Lions football team =

American college football season

1978 Penn State Nittany Lions football

Eastern champion

Sugar Bowl, L 7–14 vs. Alabama
- Conference: Independent

Ranking
- Coaches: No. 4
- AP: No. 4
- Record: 11–1
- Head coach: Joe Paterno (13th season)
- Offensive scheme: I formation
- Defensive coordinator: Jerry Sandusky (2nd season)
- Base defense: 4–3
- Captains: Chuck Fusina; Matt Suhey
- Home stadium: Beaver Stadium

1978 NCAA Division I-A independents football records
	Conf.					Overall
Team	W		L		T	W		L		T
No. 4 Penn State		–		–		11	–	1	–	0
North Texas State		–		–		9	–	2	–	0
East Carolina		–		–		9	–	3	–	0
Navy		–		–		9	–	3	–	0
No. 7 Notre Dame		–		–		9	–	3	–	0
Rutgers		–		–		9	–	3	–	0
Florida State		–		–		8	–	3	–	0
Tennessee State		–		–		8	–	3	–	0
Temple		–		–		7	–	3	–	1
Pittsburgh		–		–		8	–	4	–	0
Holy Cross		–		–		7	–	4	–	0
Louisville		–		–		7	–	4	–	0
UNLV		–		–		7	–	4	–	0
Southern Miss		–		–		7	–	4	–	0
Northeast Louisiana		–		–		6	–	4	–	1
Georgia Tech		–		–		7	–	5	–	0
Hawaii		–		–		6	–	5	–	0
Miami (FL)		–		–		6	–	5	–	0
South Carolina		–		–		5	–	5	–	1
William & Mary		–		–		5	–	5	–	1
Cincinnati		–		–		5	–	6	–	0
Villanova		–		–		5	–	6	–	0
Army		–		–		4	–	6	–	1
Memphis State		–		–		4	–	7	–	0
Tulane		–		–		4	–	7	–	0
Virginia Tech		–		–		4	–	7	–	0
Air Force		–		–		3	–	8	–	0
Colgate		–		–		3	–	8	–	0
Richmond		–		–		3	–	8	–	0
Syracuse		–		–		3	–	8	–	0
Illinois State		–		–		2	–	9	–	0
West Virginia		–		–		2	–	9	–	0
Boston College		–		–		0	–	11	–	0
Rankings from AP Poll

The 1978 Penn State Nittany Lions football team represented Pennsylvania State University as an independent during the 1978 NCAA Division I-A football season. Led by 13th-year head coach Joe Paterno, the Nittany Lions compiled a record of 11–1 with a loss to Alabama in the Sugar Bowl. Penn State played home games at Beaver Stadium in University Park, Pennsylvania.

== Schedule ==
Date	Opponent	Rank	Site	TV	Result	Attendance	Source
September 1	at Temple	No. 3	Veterans Stadium; Philadelphia, PA		W 10–7	53,103	
September 9	Rutgers	No. 3	Beaver Stadium; University Park, PA		W 26–10	77,154	
September 16	at No. 6 Ohio State	No. 5	Ohio Stadium; Columbus, OH (rivalry)	ABC	W 19–0	88,202	
September 23	SMU	No. 3	Beaver Stadium; University Park, PA		W 26–21	77,704	
September 30	TCU	No. 5	Beaver Stadium; University Park, PA		W 58–0	76,832	
October 7	at Kentucky	No. 5	Commonwealth Stadium; Lexington, KY		W 30–0	58,068	
October 21	Syracuse^{†}	No. 2	Beaver Stadium; University Park, PA (rivalry)		W 45–15	77,827	
October 28	at West Virginia	No. 2	Mountaineer Field; Morgantown, WV (rivalry)		W 49–21	34,010	
November 4	No. 5 Maryland	No. 2	Beaver Stadium; University Park, PA (rivalry)	ABC	W 27–3	78,019	
November 11	NC State	No. 2	Beaver Stadium; University Park, PA		W 19–10	77,043	
November 24	No. 15 Pittsburgh	No. 1	Beaver Stadium; University Park, PA (rivalry)	ABC	W 17–10	77,465	
January 1, 1979	vs. No. 2 Alabama	No. 1	Louisiana Superdome; New Orleans, LA (Sugar Bowl, rivalry)	ABC	L 7–14	76,824	
^{†}Homecoming; Rankings from AP Poll released prior to the game

== Game summaries ==
=== Temple ===
#3 Penn State at Temple

Team	1	2	3	4	Total
• Penn St	0	0	7	3	10
Temple	0	0	0	7	7

- Date: September 1
- Location: Veterans Stadium, Philadelphia
- Game attendance: 53,103

Scoring summary
Q3	:56	PSU	Booker Moore 26 yard run (Matt Bahr kick)	PSU 7–0
Q4	10:49	TEM	Zachary Dixon 21 yard pass from Brian Broomell (Firovanti kick)	Tie 7–7
Q4	:10	PSU	Matt Bahr 23 yard field goal	PSU 10–7

=== Ohio State ===
Team	1	2	3	4	Total
• Penn St	3	0	7	9	19
Ohio St	0	0	0	0	0

- Date: September 18
- Location: Ohio Stadium
- Game start: 1:00 p.m. EST
- Elapsed time: 2:48
- Game attendance: 88,202
- Game weather: Cloudy; 80 °F (27 °C); wind 10 mph (16 km/h) SW
- Television network: ABC

Scoring summary
Q1	9:52	PSU	Bahr 30 yard field goal	PSU 3–0
Q3	4:52	PSU	Suhey 3 yard run (Bahr kick)	PSU 10–0
Q4	13:12	PSU	Bahr 41 yard field goal	PSU 13–0
Q4	6:45	PSU	Bahr 25 yard field goal	PSU 16–0
Q4	2:53	PSU	Bahr 30 yard field goal	PSU 19–0

=== Maryland ===
Team	1	2	3	4	Total
Maryland	0	3	0	0	3
• Penn State	3	10	7	7	27

- Date: November 4
- Location: Beaver Stadium, University Park, Pennsylvania
- Game attendance: 78,019

Scoring summary
1	PSU	Bahr 33-yard field goal	PSU 3-0
2	PSU	Fusina 1-yard run (Bahr kick)	PSU 10-0
2	MD	Loncar 39-yard field goal	PSU 10-3
2	PSU	Bahr 44-yard field goal	PSU 13-3
3	PSU	Donovan 63-yard pass from Fusina (Bahr kick)	PSU 20-3
4	PSU	Moore 4-yard run (Bahr kick)	PSU 27-3

=== Syracuse ===
Chuck Fusina threw four touchdown passes, including two to Scott Fitzkee as second-ranked Penn State extended its win streak to 15 games. Fusina finished 15 of 27 for 293 yards.

== Roster ==
1978 Penn State Nittany Lions football team roster
Players
Coaches
Offense

Pos.	#	Name	Class
WR	81	Bob Bassett	Sr
WR	29	Mark Cherewka	Fr
C	55	Chuck Correal	Sr
OT	68	Eric Cunningham	Sr
WR	19	Tom Donovan	Jr
OT	71	Keith Dorney	Sr
OT	77	Bill Dugan	So
WR	46	Scott Fitzkee	Sr
QB	14	Chuck Fusina	Sr
RB	24	Mike Guman	Jr
WR	41	Tracy Hall	So
TE	85	Vyto Kab	Fr
RB	38	Mike Meade	Fr
RB	48	Booker Moore	So
G	78	Mike Munchak	Fr
OT	70	Irv Pankey	Jr
C	50	Jack Poll	Sr
G	53	Jim Romano	Fr
TE	80	Brad Scovill	So
RB	32	Matt Suhey	Jr
FB	39	Bob Torrey	Sr
WR	13	Kip Vernaglia	Jr
G	64	John Wojtowicz	So

Defense

Pos.	#	Name	Class
DB	30	Matt Bradley	Fr
DB	25	Tom Bradley	Sr
DT	96	Frank Case	So
DE	54	Bruce Clark	Jr
DE	66	Rich D'Amico	Fr
LB	92	Rick Donaldson	Jr
LB	52	Steve Griffiths	So
S	27	Pete Harris	So
DT	70	Greg Jones	So
DE	74	Larry Kubin	So
DT	57	Pete Kugler	So
LB	56	Lance Mehl	Jr
LB	60	Matt Millen	Jr
DE	28	Rich Milot	Sr
LB	94	Chet Parlavecchio	Fr
DB	12	Doug Pysher	Sr
LB	89	Carlos Quirch	Jr
LB	65	Paul Suhey	Sr
S	23	John Walsh	So
CB	49	Tom Wise	So
DT	61	Leo Wisniewski	Fr

Special teams

Pos.	#	Name	Class
K	10	Matt Bahr	Sr

Head coach

- Joe Paterno

Coordinators/assistant coaches

- Dick Anderson
- Booker Brooks
- Kit Cartwright
- Fran Ganter
- Bob Phillips
- John Rosenberg
- Jerry Sandusky
- J. T. White
- Jim Williams

Legend

- (C) Team captain
- (S) Suspended
- (I) Ineligible
- Injured
- Redshirt

Roster

== Awards ==
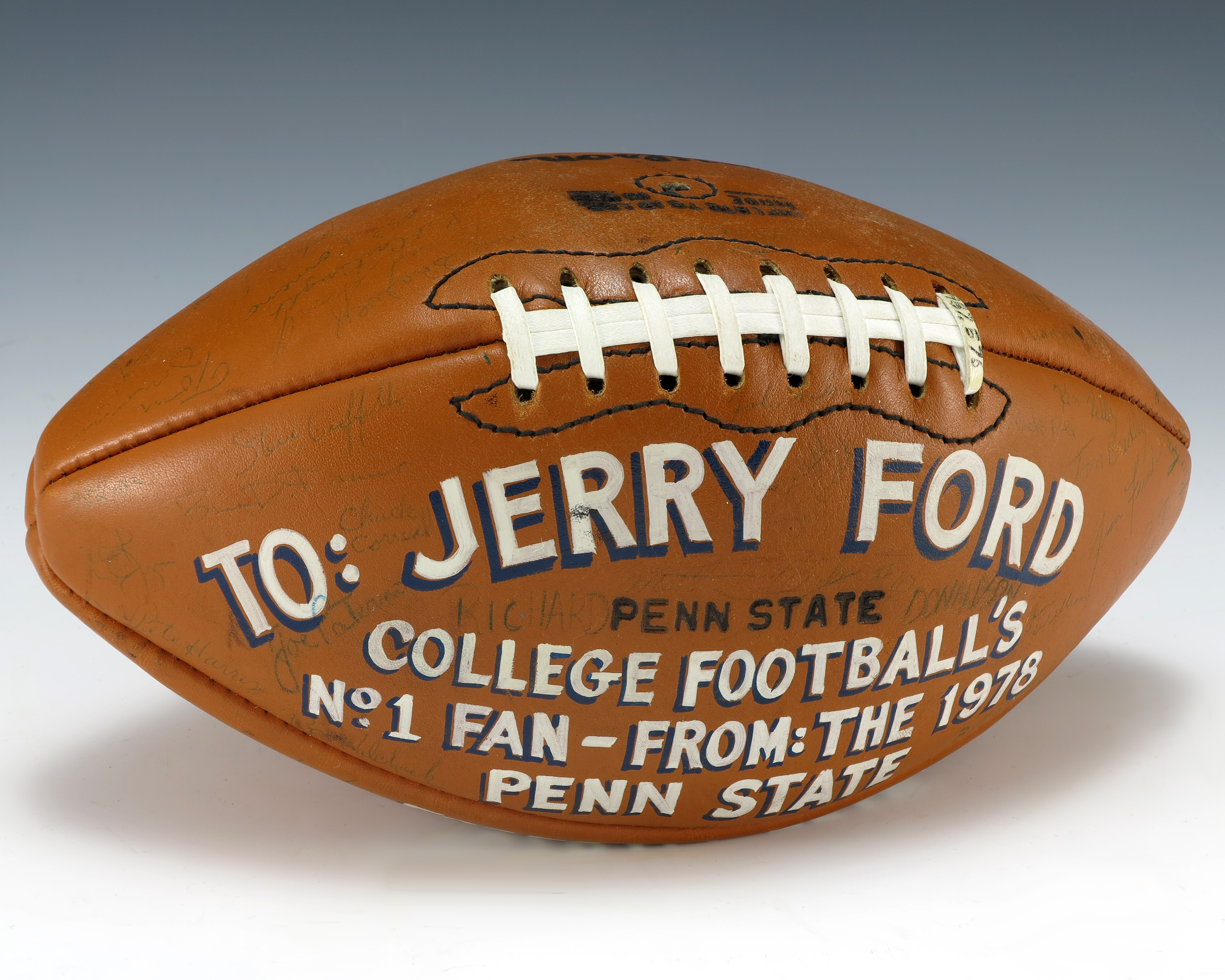
A football signed by the 1978 Penn State Nittany Lions football team, including Chuck Fusina, Matt Millen, and head coach Joe Paterno.

- Bruce Clark

Lombardi Award

- Chuck Fusina

Maxwell Award

- Joe Paterno

Eddie Robinson Coach of the Year

== NFL draft ==
Nine Nittany Lions were selected in the 1979 NFL draft.

Round	Pick	Overall	Name	Position	Team
1st	10	10	Keith Dorney	Offensive tackle	Detroit Lions
4th	14	96	Eric Cunningham	Offensive guard	New York Jets
5th	16	126	Scott Fitzkee	Wide receiver	Philadelphia Eagles
5th	23	133	Chuck Fusina	Quarterback	Tampa Bay Buccaneers
6th	8	145	Bob Torrey	Running back	New York Giants
6th	28	165	Matt Bahr	Placekicker	Pittsburgh Steelers
7th	17	182	Rich Milot	Linebacker	Washington Redskins
8th	4	196	Chuck Correal	Center	Philadelphia Eagles
10th	6	265	Tony Petruccio	Defensive linemen	San Diego Chargers
