= Carl Peterson =

American football coach

Personal information
- Born: May 26, 1943 (age 83); Minneapolis, Minnesota, U.S.

Career information
- College: UCLA

Career history

Coaching
- Sonoma State (1969) Assistant coach; Sonoma State (1970–1971) Head coach; UCLA (1973–1975) Assistant coach; Philadelphia Eagles (1976–1977) Tight ends coach

Operations
- Philadelphia Eagles (1977–1982) Director of player personnel; Philadelphia/Baltimore Stars (1982–1985) President, general manager & part-owner; Kansas City Chiefs (1989–2008) President, general manager & chief executive officer
- Executive profile at Pro Football Reference

Carl D. Peterson (born May 26, 1943) is a former American collegiate and professional football coach and executive in the National Football League (NFL). He began his coaching career at Sonoma State University and later became the assistant general manager for the Philadelphia Eagles. He was hired as the president and general manager of the Kansas City Chiefs in 1988, a position he held until 2008.

Peterson was active in American football for more than 50 years. He started at the high school level, then moved on to professional football, working with the Philadelphia Eagles (NFL), Philadelphia Stars (USFL), and the Kansas City Chiefs (NFL).

Since leaving the Chiefs, Peterson has worked in a number of football-related organizations, including USA Football, the Pro Football Hall of Fame, and FanVision. He was named a semifinalist for induction into the Pro Football Hall of Fame Class of 2023.

== Education and early coaching career ==
Carl Daniel Peterson was born on May 26, 1943, in the Swedish Hospital in Minneapolis, Minnesota. He was the third of four sons born to Louise and Eric Peterson. His father worked heavy construction jobs throughout the Midwest, working on the home front of the Second World War. When Carl was three years old, the family moved to Long Beach, California, where Eric began a construction business with his brother-in-law.

Peterson attended Woodrow Wilson Classical High School in Long Beach, participating in football and baseball for the Wilson Bruins with the help of football coach Skip Rowland. Peterson played end and kicker. He was part of the graduating class of 1961 at Wilson and went on to earn three degrees from the University of California, Los Angeles (UCLA): a bachelor's degree in 1966, a master's degree in 1967, and a doctorate in 1970.

Peterson's football playing career ended during practice at UCLA when he suffered three torn knee ligaments. His coaching career began soon afterwards at Wilson where he coached the junior varsity and assisted the varsity football teams. He then moved on to Loyola High School in Los Angeles, where he coached the offensive line for head coach Mario DiMuro. He also taught classes in general mathematics, geometry, and trigonometry, at the California State Sonoma (now known as Sonoma State University) in the Santa Rosa/Rohnert Park, California, area. It was one of eighteen California state universities. He was hired as the head baseball coach and an assistant under head football coach Lloyd Helgeson. Sonoma State played football at the junior varsity level in 1969. Peterson succeeded Helgeson as head coach in 1970 when Sonoma State moved up to varsity status, competing at the NCAA College Division level. He led Sonoma State to a record of 6–12–1 over two seasons, 1970 and 1971 before the school disbanded its football program in 1972. Peterson left Sonoma State in February 1973.

In 1969, Peterson applied for and was hired as an assistant football coach at UCLA under head coach Pepper Rodgers. When Dick Vermeil took over as head coach of the Bruins in 1974, he retained Peterson on his coaching staff.

== NFL coaching and administrative career ==
Peterson's career as a talent evaluator began during his days with the Philadelphia Eagles, between 1976 and 1982. New Eagles head coach Dick Vermeil took him along from UCLA, where in 1976, Peterson served as tight ends coach, special teams coach, and administrative assistant. In February 1977, Vermeil promoted Peterson to a position in charge of player personnel with the Eagles. During this period, the Eagles reached four consecutive playoff seasons, including an appearance in Super Bowl XV.

== USFL administrative career ==
In the spring of 1982, Peterson was contacted by the owners of a new team in Philadelphia scheduled to play in the United States Football League (USFL). After conversations with partners Myles Tannenbaum, Harold Schaeffer, and Arthur Powell, Peterson was hired as president, general manager, and part owner of the franchise that would eventually be named the Philadelphia Stars in July 1982.

Peterson was hired alongside head coach George Perles, the then-defensive coordinator of the Pittsburgh Steelers. Perles would leave just a few months after being hired to take the head coaching job at his alma mater, Michigan State University. With a first training camp six weeks away, Peterson hired New England Patriots defensive coordinator Jim Mora Sr., whom he had worked with at UCLA under Vermeil. The team reached all three USFL Championship Games, and captured titles in 1984 and 1985. Through the USFL Drafts, Peterson added players RB Kelvin Bryant from the University of North Carolina, OT Irv Eatman from UCLA and C Bart Oates from Brigham Young University in early rounds, and later found CB Antonio Gibson from the University of Cincinnati and P Sean Landeta out of Towson State University.

The 1984 team finished with a 19–2 record, defeating the Arizona Wranglers in the title game. In 1985, the Stars became a commuting team, having been removed from their former home at Veterans Stadium in Philadelphia because of the USFL's plans—led by New Jersey Generals owner Donald Trump—to move from the spring to a fall schedule. That forced them to become the Baltimore Stars, playing that season at Byrd Stadium on the campus of the University of Maryland. Still, they were able to win the league championship, beating the Oakland Invaders, 28–24. The Stars' 48–13–1 overall record during regular and postseason play, including a 7–1 postseason record, was the best of any USFL club.

Due to that success, Peterson's efforts were rewarded in 1983 and 1984, when he was named The Sporting News' USFL Executive of the Year. Five Stars were named to 18 spots in the NFL Pro Bowl: Mills and Oates (5 times each), DL William Fuller (4), Landeta and LB Mike Johnson (2 each.) Mills was voted into the Pro Football Hall of Fame with the class of 2022.

Peterson possessed the USFL championship trophy from the league's folding until 2018 when he donated the trophy to the Pro Football Hall of Fame.

== After the USFL ==
In the following year, he took over as chief executive officer of a magazine, Philly Sport, that was dedicated to the sports scene in Philadelphia. He was also part of a group led by Philadelphia Flyers and Spectrum owner Ed Snider that sought to purchase the financially troubled Dallas Cowboys and Texas Stadium. Ultimately, the Philadelphia group was outbid for the team and stadium by Arkansas oilman Jerry Jones.

== Kansas City Chiefs ==
In November 1988, Peterson was asked by Chiefs owner Lamar Hunt to study his football team and operations. Hunt offered Peterson the job running the franchise. On December 18, 1988, Hunt announced Peterson would replace Jack Steadman as team president and Jim Schaaf as general manager.

=== Chiefs on the field (1989–1998) ===
Peterson faced a rebuilding project with the Chiefs. In the previous 17 seasons (1972–88), the team had five different head coaches, eight different starting quarterbacks, only four winning seasons and one trip to the playoffs (1986). It was after that '86 postseason that the team's front office fired head coach John Mackovic. Marty Schottenheimer was announced on January 24 as Kansas City's seventh head coach.

In the first round of the 1989 NFL Draft, he used the fourth selection to take LB Derrick Thomas from the University of Alabama. Over the next decade, Thomas became known in Kansas City for his play on the field (134 sacks in 179 regular and postseason games and nine Pro Bowls). Peterson found players in all areas of the NFL Draft, including first round choices like Thomas (1989), CB Dale Carter (1992), S Jerome Woods (1996) and TE Tony Gonzalez (1997). Thomas and Gonzalez are members of the Pro Football Hall of Fame. In those first 10 seasons under Peterson's direction, the Chiefs posted an overall record of 104-65-1 (regular and postseason), with three division titles and seven appearances in the playoffs.

=== Chiefs on the field (1999–2008) ===
After 10 seasons as head coach, Schottenheimer resigned following the 1998 season, the only one in a decade in which the Chiefs did not finish with a winning record. Peterson selected defensive coordinator Gunther Cunningham to be head coach, and over two seasons the Chiefs finished with a 16–16 record. In the early days of 2001, Peterson learned that his former boss Dick Vermeil was interested in returning to coaching. After winning the Super Bowl in the 1999 season with the St. Louis Rams, Vermeil had retired for a second time. But he decided to return to the league, and he directed the team for five seasons (2001–05) and the team posted a 44–37 record, including a 13-3 division title year in 2003 that ended with a home loss in the AFC Divisional Playoffs to Indianapolis, 38–31.

When Vermeil retired for the third—and final—time as an NFL head coach, Peterson reached for a familiar name as his replacement: Herm Edwards. The pair had known each other since the days when UCLA assistant coach Peterson tried to recruit California high school player Edwards to become a Bruin. Later, Peterson signed Edwards as an undrafted free agent with the Eagles. He worked for the Chiefs as a scout for two years and was then hired in 1993 as the team's secondary coach. Edwards' tenure started strong when the Chiefs went 9–7 in the 2006 season, earning a spot in the playoffs where they lost in an AFC Wild Card Game to Indianapolis, 23–8. With the team's roster aging, Edwards began a building project, working with player personnel director Bill Kuharich to get more young talent on the field. The team went 4-12 (2007) and 2-14 (2008) in the next two seasons, and on December 15, 2008, Chiefs Chairman and Part Owner Clark Hunt announced Peterson's resignation, effective January 15, 2009.

=== Overall Chiefs on the field (1989–2008) ===
In Peterson's 20 years with the Chiefs, they had six losing seasons, a record of 176–143–1, nine playoff seasons, in which they posted only a 3–9 record and just one AFC Championship appearance—in 1993. Over 20 years, eight players who wore a Chiefs uniform under Peterson's direction were inducted into the Pro Football Hall of Fame. Besides the three Peterson draft choices that have been honored (Derrick Thomas in 2009, Will Shields in 2015 and Tony Gonzalez in 2019), center Mike Webster (1989–90) was inducted in 1997, QB Joe Montana (1993–94) in 2000, RB Marcus Allen (1993–97) in 2003, QB Warren Moon (1999–2000) in 2006 and LT Willie Roaf (2002–05) in 2012.

=== Arrowhead Stadium and Chiefs off-field success ===
The Arrowhead Stadium opened in 1972. To help him turn around the team's business, Peterson hired telecom executive Tim Connolly, who became the executive vice-president of administration. They began making changes inside and outside Arrowhead Stadium. There was a new partnership with Ticketmaster to make access to buying seats easier and the Chiefs improved handicap access. They moved the team's radio broadcast rights to an FM-music channel, 101 the Fox, in hopes of reaching a younger demographic that wasn't buying tickets. It was only the second NFL team to have its games carried on FM. Peterson began having his radio show every week during the season, giving fans access to the decision maker, something they never had during the previous administration. Peterson also reached out to Chiefs alumni who were no longer involved with the franchise. He formed the Chiefs Ambassadors, a group of former players who became involved in team functions, talking and helping current players, and also holding charitable events in the Kansas City community. The Ambassadors are still active and the idea has been copied by other NFL teams.

In 1988, the Chiefs reported 23,594 seats sold on a season ticket basis. That was out of a stadium capacity of over 78,000. The team averaged 50,781 fans per regular season home game. With the off-field changes, and growing success on the field, slowly fans started returning to Arrowhead. By 1991, the season ticket sales reached 52,867 seats, with an average attendance at home games of 74,762. In 1991, the Chiefs sold out their home opener against Atlanta, first in a string of 149 consecutive sellouts. They led the NFL in attendance for six straight years (1994–99) and the AFC in paid attendance every year from 1992 through 2008.

== After the Chiefs ==
After stepping down from Kansas City on January 15, 2009, Peterson did not walk away from the game of football that had been part of his life since the 1960s. He became involved in several different avenues of the game.

=== USA Football ===
In June 2009 at the request of NFL Commissioner Roger Goodell, Peterson became the chairman of USA Football. He replaced the late AFL quarterback and U.S. Congressman Jack Kemp, in the role after Kemp's death. Peterson previously served on the NFL Youth Football Fund (YFF) Board of Directors, a 501(c)(3) non-profit foundation formed by the NFL and the NFLPA in 1998. The NFL Foundation committee was formed in 2013 to oversee much of the work previously established by the NFL YFF. Retired four-star Army Gen. Raymond T. Odierno replaced Peterson as Chairman of USA Football in January 2017.

=== NFL League Office and Pro Football Hall of Fame ===
Peterson was asked by Commissioner Roger Goodell to serve on several committees within the NFL, including a group that provided background information and recommendations on possible hires for general manager and head coaching positions. He was also asked to serve as an adviser to the Pro Football Hall of Fame Selection Committee that helped create a special class of inductees for the NFL's 100th anniversary.

=== Stephen Ross and FanVision ===
New York real estate executive Stephen Ross asked Peterson to serve as an advisor for his interests in the Miami Dolphins and a media company called FanVision. Ross purchased controlling interest in the Dolphins in 2009, and part of that deal was FanVision, a handheld device that could service fans in stadiums, arenas and race tracks with live television, and other information streams. Peterson helped introduce Ross to NFL figures in hopes of getting them to sign on for the service.

== Philanthropy, Activities and Awards ==
Peterson serves on the National Board for the Maxwell Football Club and serves as chairman of the board of trustees for the Pop Warner Little Scholars organization. He is a member of the International World Presidents Organization (IWPO) and serves on the board of the Third and Long Foundation, founded by the late Pro Football Hall of Famer Derrick Thomas. Peterson was inducted into the Pennsylvania Sports Hall of Fame in 2009, into the Missouri Sports Hall of Fame in 2005 and into the Long Beach (CA) Sports Hall of Fame in 2003. Other honors he has received include: the 2002 Pop Warner Award for Excellence in Athletics, the 2001 Pro Football Executive Award (All-American Football Foundation), the '98 Maxwell Football Club Reds Bagnell Award for Outstanding Contributions to the Game of Football, and the '98 Special Achievement Award for Professional Athletics, presented by the Greater Kansas City Sports Commission. In 2012, Peterson won the Pete Rozelle Award presented by the Touchdown Club of New Orleans for his time as president, general manager and CEO of the Kansas City Chiefs and chairman for USA Football. In 2016, Peterson received the Ellis Island Medal of Honor from the National Ethnic Coalition of Organizations, which pays homage to the contribution made to America by immigrants and their children. Peterson was presented with the Missouri Sports Hall of Fame 2023 President's Award for his long-time support and efforts for the state's sporting scene. He received the 2023 Sergeant Major Pete Haas Semper Fidelis Award from the Marine Corps Law Enforcement Foundation for his contributions to professional football.

== Personal ==
Peterson and his wife Lori have one daughter Dawn. They live in Kansas City, MO.

== Head coaching record ==
Year	Team	Overall	Conference	Standing	Bowl/playoffs
Sonoma State Cossacks (Far Western Conference / Northern California Athletic Conference) (1970–1971)
1970	Sonoma State	4–4–1	0–0	NA	
1971	Sonoma State	2–8	0–6	7th	
Sonoma State:		6–12–1	0–6		
Total:		6–12–1			
