= Anae =

Anae is a surname of Samoan origin.

Notable people with the surname Anae include:

- Albert Anae (born 1989), New Zealand-Australian rugby player
- Arthur Anae (born 1945), New Zealand politician
- Brad Anae (born 1957), American football player
- Bradlee Anae (born 1998), American football player
- Robert Anae, American football coach
- Tumua Anae (born 1988), American water polo player

== See also ==
- The Atlas of North American English, commonly abbreviated to "the ANAE"
