= Rodney Parker =

American football player (born 1953)

No. 74, 83, 84
- Position: Wide receiver

Personal information
- Born: July 18, 1953 (age 73); Mobile, Alabama, U.S.
- Listed height: 6 ft 1 in (1.85 m)
- Listed weight: 190 lb (86 kg)

Career information
- High school: Francis T. Nicholls (LA)
- College: Tennessee State
- NFL draft: 1978: 6th round, 152nd overall pick

Career history
- Atlanta Falcons (1978)*; Saskatchewan Roughriders (1978–1979); Philadelphia Eagles (1980–1982); Philadelphia Stars (1983–1984); San Antonio Gunslingers (1984)
- * Offseason or practice squad member only

Career NFL statistics
- Games played: 19
- Receptions: 17
- Receiving yards: 316
- Touchdowns: 3
- Stats at Pro Football Reference

Career CFL statistics
- Games played: 10
- Receptions: 25
- Receiving yards: 581
- Touchdowns: 2

Rodney Parker (born July 18, 1953) is an American former gridiron football wide receiver who played six seasons professionally. He played college football at Tennessee State and was a sixth round NFL draft pick of the Atlanta Falcons in 1978. After being released by them in training camp, Parker signed in the Canadian Football League (CFL) with the Saskatchewan Roughriders, with whom he would play until being released in 1979. In the 1980 season, Parker returned to the National Football League (NFL) by signing with the Philadelphia Eagles. After two seasons with them, Parker played two years in the United States Football League (USFL) with the Philadelphia Stars and San Antonio Gunslingers.

== Early life and education ==
Parker was born on July 18, 1953, in Mobile, Alabama, where he grew up. He attended Francis T. Nicholls High School in New Orleans, Louisiana, and is the only attendee of that school ever to play in the National Football League (NFL). In his school, he was a "star" participant in track and field.

When Parker was 16 years old, he worked as an usher at Super Bowl IV. He worked at the 40-yard line behind the Kansas City Chiefs bench.

In 1974, Parker enrolled at Tennessee State University. He made the varsity team for his sophomore season, 1975. As a junior in 1976, Parker recorded 25 receptions for 552 yards and scored five touchdowns. His 552 receiving yards led the team.

An article on Parker in The Tennessean shortly before his senior season began said the following:

Shucks, Rodney Parker, Tennessee State University's senior flanker, isn't so hard to stop. He was stopped twice yesterday on his way to football practice. Once by a pro scout from Los Angeles, then by a scout from Seattle. Once he gets in uniform, and on the football field, and folks in different-colored uniforms try to stop him, though, it's an entirely different matter. He isn't so easily halted then. And it's that quality that is filling up page after page in the scouts' notebooks: 'good speed,' they scribble, 'great balance...good hands.'

Parker recorded 16 catches for 271 yards and one touchdown as a senior in nine games.

== Professional career ==
=== Atlanta Falcons ===
After graduating from Tennessee State, Parker was selected in the sixth round (152nd overall) of the 1978 NFL draft by the Atlanta Falcons. The Atlanta Constitution reported that he "may return kicks." He signed his rookie contract on June 9. On August 1, in training camp, Parker suffered a strained knee that the Falcons announced would sideline him for several weeks. Parker was placed on waivers on August 15.

=== Saskatchewan Roughriders ===
Parker was signed by the Saskatchewan Roughriders of the Canadian Football League (CFL) as an American import in early September to replace Ron Jamerson. In his CFL debut, a 29–31 loss to the Winnipeg Blue Bombers, Parker had a "big night," recording six catches for 108 yards. In his second appearance, Parker "banged up" his knee against the BC Lions on a punt return and strained several ligaments. As a result, he missed several games and was placed on the injured list. He eventually recovered and appeared in three more games, ending his season with five appearances, 15 receptions for 349 yards and two touchdowns as Saskatchewan finished with a record of 4–11–1.

On March 30, 1979, Parker was re-signed by the Roughriders. Sportswriter Ruddy MacLean of The Leader-Post called him "one of the fastest runners in the CFL." Parker appeared in five games, recording 10 catches for 232 yards before being placed on waivers in August. He finished his CFL career with 25 receptions for 581 yards and two touchdowns in ten games.

After being released by Saskatchewan, at the time the worst team in professional football, Parker gave up on advancing his sports career. "At first, it hurt," he said. "I was really down. The idea that I'd played my last football game took some getting used to. When you have to go home and face friends and tell them you got cut by the worst team in Canada and that you're going to be doing something else rather than-playing football..." Believing his career was over, Parker returned to school and completed courses to become a deputy sheriff.

=== Philadelphia Eagles ===
==== 1980 ====
Early in 1980, Parker was contacted by Carl Peterson, director of player personnel for the Philadelphia Eagles. Peterson invited him to the Eagles minicamp. "I was shocked. I mean, after getting cut by the worst team in pro football, you really have to figure that's going to diminish any interest the National Football League is going to have in you," Parker said. "But when Carl called I accepted on the spot. I didn't even ask for some time to think about it. I guess I didn't want to give them any time to think about it. I didn't want to give him a chance to renege or to change his mind." He impressed in the minicamp and was invited to their training camp in Hershey, Pennsylvania. He was given a contract on May 19.

In a preseason game against the New York Jets, which the Eagles won 28–13, Parker caught a touchdown pass from quarterback Joe Pisarcik. Parker was the final receiver to be released at roster cuts, and was let go to make room for rookie tight end Ray Sydnor. "I was the last receiver cut," he said. "But they said, 'If anyone goes down, if anyone gets injured,'" he would be able to go back. Parker didn't believe it, and became a deputy sheriff in New Orleans on the third week of August.

However, at the end of September, receiver Scott Fitzkee suffered an injury versus the St. Louis Cardinals and Parker was asked to rejoin the team. "I was watching 60 Minutes when Carl [Peterson] called again," Parker said. "I was surprised to hear his voice again. He said, 'I've got some good news. We've had some injuries and we'd like to have you back.' I didn't even let him get in another word. I said 'I'll be on the first plane in the morning.'" "I liked him when I saw him at Tennessee State," said Peterson. "I went down there and saw him and Jerrold McRae and Randy Williamson (both Tennessee State players). Frankly, I liked Rodney the best of all three. So when I could, I signed him as a free agent for our camp, and he made it all the way to the last cut. When we lost Scott [Fitzkee], we turned to him." He became the Eagles' fourth receiver on the depth chart, behind Wally Henry.

Parker was given a locker that was meant for interior offensive linemen, due to the Eagles having no others available, and at first, was mainly used to demonstrate routes of opposing receivers in practice. He saw little action in games until October 26, against the Chicago Bears, where he made an important play that contributed to the Eagles' 17–14 win. Early in the fourth quarter, with the game tied 14–14, the Eagles were at the Bears' 35-yard line on third-and-seven. Joe Pisarcik, who had come in for the injured Ron Jaworski, threw an incomplete pass to Harold Carmichael. The Eagles were going to attempt a long field goal on fourth down, but Bears coach Neill Armstrong decided to accept an offensive pass interference penalty, which gave the Eagles a third-and-17 at the Bears' 45-yard line. Wally Henry, who was usually sent onto the field for such situations, had been injured four plays earlier by safety Gary Fencik, and so coach Dick Vermeil sent in Parker for the play. He found an opening in the Bears' prevent defense, and made his first career catch on a 20-yard pass for a crucial first down.

Parker saw significant playing time in the Eagles' 24–0 win against the Washington Redskins three games later, making three catches for 46 yards. The first catch gained 14 yards and was a diving reception at the sideline, which gave the team an important first down. In a 21–22 loss to the San Diego Chargers two weeks afterwards, Parker made a 14-yard reception which was described as the "most difficult catch" of the game.

Entering the final game of the season, against the Dallas Cowboys, the only way the Eagles would not win the division was if they lost by 25 or more points, due to tiebreaker rules. Parker said that shortly before the game, "I was very, very sick at my stomach ... I went to practice, but was so ill I was unable to do anything. I let the coaches know. I didn't think I could even make the trip [to Dallas], but they put me under the care of the trainers and by this morning (the day of the Dallas game) I was feeling much better. The problem by then was strength. I was weak from lack of food, but I stacked up on Snickers bars and told them I'd be ready if they needed me."

After injuries to Harold Carmichael and Charlie Smith, Parker was put in the game and made four receptions for 68 yards, including his first career touchdown, which, according to quarterback Ron Jaworski, "may have been the biggest catch of this season." At the beginning of the fourth quarter, the Cowboys had taken a 25-point lead (35–10) and the Eagles had just received the ball. Jaworski then drove the Eagles down to the Dallas 30-yard line, where they faced a third-and-nine. The Austin American-Statesman reported,

Time for a quick look-in, something the guy the Eagles would have preferred not to be playing in this situation (Parker) might be able to execute. Good for 10 yards, maybe, and maybe another first down. But when he came to the line of scrimmage and saw the Dallas secondary adjust to the call, Jaworski hoped the new guy out on the right end (Parker) would see it, too. Not that he could count on it, since the man had caught all of five passes all year.

"I was a little nervous when I saw that," Jaworski said. "The way things had been going, I had to be." "We were looking for a one-on-one situation, and when [Steve] Wilson came up to bump-and-run, we knew we had to change the pattern," Parker said. "I could see he didn't have any help behind him, so I just took off. Jaws read it perfectly." Jaworski threw a deep pass towards Parker, who positioned himself, then leaped over the defender, caught the ball and fell into the endzone for the touchdown. It made the score 17–35, and the Eagles eventually lost 27–35, but still won the division as they had not lost by 25 or more points.

Prior to the Eagles' first playoff game, the divisional round against the Minnesota Vikings, Parker was named the third receiver on the depth chart due to an injury to Charlie Smith. Parker got the ball once in the game, a 31–16 win, on a "slick-looking double reverse play" where he ran for 12 yards. After Scott Fitzkee was injured in the game, Parker and Harold Carmichael became the only healthy receivers on the team. Due to the injuries, Parker was named a starter for the NFC Championship game against the rival Dallas Cowboys. He recorded four receptions for 31 yards in the game, a 20–7 win, as the Eagles advanced to Super Bowl XV.

Prior to the Super Bowl, against the Oakland Raiders, Parker recalled his experience as a Super Bowl usher eleven years prior in an interview with the Philadelphia Daily News:

I remember it like it was yesterday. I was 16 at the time, a student at Nicholls High. I couldn't believe it — me, working at the Super Bowl. The atmosphere was like nothing I had ever seen before. It was like a big party in that stadium. There were people from all over the country. Half the people were in purple (for Minnesota), the other half were in red (for Kansas City). Loud? Man, my ears were ringing. When the game was over, I had to help the security guards get the players off the field. It was my job to help move the crowd back from the Kansas City locker room. I remember standing there, watching the players walk past. It was a cold day, you could see their breath. I remember seeing Willie Lanier, No. 63, go by. I remember seeing Otis Taylor and thinking, 'Wow, look how big he is.' They were all shouting and hugging each other, celebrating the win. I was playing high school football at the time and I thought, 'Hey, maybe I'll play in the Super Bowl one of these days.' I never told anybody else because they would've thought I was crazy. What are the odds against you ever playing in a Super Bowl? Now here I am, an usher coming back as a player 10 years later. Amazing, isn't it, the game being held in my hometown and all? It has to be the Lord's will. What else could explain what's happened to me?

External videos
- Super Bowl XV Oakland 27 Philadelphia 10 (1981), film about Super Bowl XV. Parker's touchdown, which was called back, is shown from 5:58–6:48.

Prior to the game, Charlie Smith recovered, putting Parker back into a backup role, but still in a position to receive significant playing time. At the beginning of the game, the Raiders took a 7–0 lead, following an interception by Rod Martin. On the next drive, the Eagles drove down to the Raiders' 40-yard line, where they faced a third down. Jaworski then threw a 40-yard touchdown to Parker to tie the score, 7–7, but it was called back by a controversial illegal motion penalty on Harold Carmichael. An NBC Sports article years later described the penalty as the seventh worst call ever made against the Eagles. Philadelphia was forced to punt and the Raiders scored on an 80-yard touchdown pass a few plays later. The Eagles were never able to recover and ended up losing 10–27, in their first Super Bowl appearance. Parker finished the game with one reception for 19 yards.

==== 1981–1982 ====
External videos
- #TBT Ron Jawkorski connecting with Rodney Parker (1981). Video of Rodney Parker scoring a touchdown against the New York Giants in week one, 1981.

Parker began preseason third on the depth chart at receiver, behind Charlie Smith and Harold Carmichael, but also competing with Scott Fitzkee, Ray Sydnor, Alvin Hooks, Luther Blue and Wally Henry for a spot on the final roster. He survived roster cuts and made the regular season team as a backup receiver. In the first game of the season, a 24–10 victory over the New York Giants, Parker caught a 55-yard touchdown pass which sealed the game for Philadelphia. On the play, quarterback Jaworski went back to throw in shotgun formation and threw a deep pass to Parker, who had gotten past safety Beasley Reece, down the left sideline at around the New York 20-yard line. Parker then caught the ball and ran untouched into the endzone for a 55-yard score, the longest of his career.

In the third game of the season, a 20–14 win over the Buffalo Bills, Parker made an important catch for a first down on third-and-ten which led to the team's first score of the game. He finished the game with two catches for 24 yards, as the Eagles won their third consecutive game. Parker made two catches for 30 yards in week six, a win over the New Orleans Saints, including one that was a single yard short of a touchdown and led to a score. It was the Eagles' sixth straight victory, and made them the only unbeaten and untied team in the league. The Eagles lost their first game of the season against the Minnesota Vikings in week seven, in which Parker made one catch for 10 yards.

External videos
- 1981 NFL Week 10 (1981), film featuring highlights from week ten of the 1981 NFL season. Parker's final touchdown is shown from 20:07–20:31.

In late October, it was announced that Parker was one of three Eagles nominated for the NFL Man of the Year Award, given to those who "not only excel on the gridiron, but also contribute generously to their communities off the field." The Courier-Post reported that Parker "spent several days visiting school career programs and many evenings at school award banquets. He appeared in the national Multiple Sclerosis Society's Read-a-Thon and helped the Philadelphia Police Department celebrate National Police Week with his appearance at police headquarters."

In week nine against the rival Dallas Cowboys, Parker made one catch for 16 yards, but dropped a crucial third down pass in the final two minutes, which, along with a missed field goal on the next play by Tony Franklin, cost the Eagles the win in a 14–17 loss. "I slanted in and the ball was there," Parker said. "I got one hand on the ball, and the next thing I know it was rolling on the ground." Parker said he believed cornerback Everson Walls had his hands on the former's hips. "I anticipated a flag, but when you get a hand on the ball you should catch it," he said. In the next game, a 52–10 win over the St. Louis Cardinals, Parker made one catch, a 33-yard touchdown. It was the final touchdown of his career.

In Parker's eleventh appearance of the season, a 38–13 win over the Baltimore Colts, he suffered a sprained left knee blocking for Wilbert Montgomery, which ended his season. The Eagles went on to compile a 10–6 record before losing to the New York Giants 21–27 in the first round of the playoffs.

In August 1982, The Morning News reported that Parker was one of "the most impressive" players in training camp. Later in the month, coach Dick Vermeil said that "if the final cut had to be made today, Parker would still be on the roster as, at worst, a role player." Despite this, he was released as part of the final roster cuts in September.

=== Later career ===
On September 27, 1982, it was announced by the Philadelphia Stars of the United States Football League (USFL) that Parker had been signed to play in the upcoming 1983 USFL season. Although expected to be a starter, he moved down in the depth chart before the season started, making him a backup to Willie Collier. Due to this, he saw very little action in the first two games and did not record a single catch. For most of the season, with the exception of four games, Parker played as a backup, and he only recorded 13 catches in limited playing time, none for touchdowns. The Stars compiled a 15–3 record in the season, and went on to play in the championship game, where they lost 22–24 to the Michigan Panthers. On the final play of the championship, Parker caught a two-yard touchdown pass.

Shortly before the 1984 season starter, Parker was traded with three others to the San Antonio Gunslingers for undisclosed draft picks. Through four games, he was the team's second leading receiver with 12 catches for 190 yards. He was released on March 21. "There's more to playing receiver than catching the ball," his coach said. "There's blocking and fighting for the ball, being aggressive. Parker just wasn't doing some of the things that needed to be done."

== Statistics ==
Season	Team	Games		Receiving				
Season	Team	GP	GS	Rec	Yds	Avg	Lng	TD
1978	SASK	5	?	15	349	23.3	52	2
1979	SASK	5	?	10	232	23.2	65	0
1980	PHI	8	0	9	148	16.4	30	1
1981	PHI	11	0	8	168	21.0	55	2
1983	STAR	17	4	13	203	15.6	29	0
1984	SAN	4	?	12	190	15.8	42	0
Career		50	4	67	1,290	19.3	65	5
