= 1978 All-Atlantic Coast Conference football team =

American college football all-star team

The 1978 All-Atlantic Coast Conference football team consists of American football players chosen by various selectors for their All-Atlantic Coast Conference ("ACC") teams for the 1978 college football season. Selectors in 1978 included the Associated Press (AP).

== Offensive selections ==
=== Ends ===
- Jerry Butler, Clemson (AP)
- Bob Loomis, North Carolina (AP)

=== Tackles ===
- Steve Kenney, Clemson (AP)
- Chris Dieterich, NC State (AP)

=== Guards ===
- Jeff Bostic, Clemson (AP)
- Mike Salzano, North Carolina (AP)

=== Centers ===
- Jim Ritcher, NC State (AP)

=== Quarterbacks ===
- Steve Fuller, Clemson (AP)

=== Backs ===
- Ted Brown, NC State (AP)
- Steve Atkins, Maryland (AP)
- Lester Brown, Clemson (AP)

== Defensive selections ==
=== Defensive linemen ===
- Jon Brooks, Clemson (AP)
- Bruce Palmer, Maryland (AP)
- Charles Johnson, Maryland (AP)
- Simon Gupton, NC State (AP)
- Jim Stuckey, Clemson (AP)

=== Linebackers ===
- Bubba Brown, Clemson (AP)
- Randy Scott, Clemson (AP)

=== Defensive backs ===
- Woodrow Wilson, NC State (AP)
- Lloyd Burruss, Maryland (AP)
- Steve Ryan, Clemson (AP)
- Ricky Barden, North Carolina (AP)

== Special teams ==
=== Placekickers ===
- Nathan Ritter, NC State (AP)

=== Punters ===
- Russ Henderson, Virginia (AP)

== Key ==
AP = Associated Press

== See also ==
1978 College Football All-America Team
