= Steve Kenney =

American football player (born 1955)

No. 73, 63
- Position: Offensive tackle

Personal information
- Born: December 26, 1955 (age 70); Wilmington, North Carolina, U.S.
- Listed height: 6 ft 4 in (1.93 m)
- Listed weight: 266 lb (121 kg)

Career information
- High school: Sanderson
- College: Clemson
- NFL draft: 1979: undrafted

Career history
- Philadelphia Eagles (1979–1985); Detroit Lions (1986)

Awards and highlights
- First-team All-ACC (1978)

Career NFL statistics
- Games played: 89
- Games started: 64
- Fumble recoveries: 3
- Stats at Pro Football Reference

Steve Kenney (born December 26, 1955) is an American former professional football player who was a guard for seven seasons with the Philadelphia Eagles and Detroit Lions of the National Football League (NFL). He played college football for the Clemson Tigers.

== NFL career ==
=== 1981 ===
During a 1981 NFL Wild Card playoff game against the New York Giants, Kenney suffered a broken ankle when teammate Stan Walters was blocking Lawrence Taylor. Taylor drive back Walters, who rolled up into Kenney's ankle in the turf of Veterans Stadium. Kenney was carried off the field by team trainers.
