= Jon Brooks (American football) =

American football player (born 1957)

No. 53, 61, 65
- Position: Linebacker

Personal information
- Born: June 22, 1957 (age 69); Saluda, South Carolina, U.S.
- Listed height: 6 ft 2 in (1.88 m)
- Listed weight: 215 lb (98 kg)

Career information
- College: Clemson
- NFL draft: 1979: 4th round, 92nd overall pick

Career history
- Detroit Lions (1979); Atlanta Falcons (1980); St. Louis Cardinals (1980); Philadelphia / Baltimore Stars (1983–1985)

Awards and highlights
- 2× First-team All-ACC (1977, 1978)

Career NFL statistics
- Sacks: 1
- Fumble recoveries: 1
- Stats at Pro Football Reference

Jonathan Brooks (born June 22, 1957) is an American former professional football player who was a linebacker in the National Football League (NFL) for the Philadelphia Eagles, Detroit Lions, Atlanta Falcons and St. Louis Cardinals. He played college football for the Clemson Tigers.
