= Charles Johnson (defensive tackle) =

American football player (born 1957)

No. 99
- Position: Defensive tackle

Personal information
- Born: June 29, 1957 (age 69); Baltimore, Maryland, U.S.
- Listed height: 6 ft 1 in (1.85 m)
- Listed weight: 262 lb (119 kg)

Career information
- High school: Southwestern (Baltimore)
- College: Maryland
- NFL draft: 1979: 3rd round, 71st overall pick

Career history
- Green Bay Packers (1979–1983)

Awards and highlights
- First-team All-ACC (1978)

Career NFL statistics
- Sacks: 7.5
- Fumble recoveries: 2
- Interceptions: 1
- Stats at Pro Football Reference

Charles Adrian Johnson (born June 29, 1957) is an American former professional football player who was a defensive tackle in the National Football League (NFL) for three seasons with the Green Bay Packers. He played college football for the Maryland Terrapins.

Johnson was selected in the third round by the Packers in the 1979 NFL draft, but did not make the 1981 team when Terry Jones became a starter. After a stint with the Philadelphia Eagles on the injured reserved list in 1982, and being cut from their 1983 team, Johnson rejoined the Packers in September 1983 for the 1983 season.
