= John Walker (American football, born 1961) =

American football player (born 1961)

No. 99, 67, 98
- Position: Defensive tackle

Personal information
- Born: September 12, 1961 (age 65); Omaha, Nebraska, U.S.
- Listed height: 6 ft 6 in (1.98 m)
- Listed weight: 270 lb (122 kg)

Career information
- High school: Benson
- College: Nebraska–Omaha
- NFL draft: 1983: 5th round, 136th overall pick

Career history
- New York Jets (1983)*; Baltimore Stars (1985); Saskatchewan Roughriders (1987); Kansas City Chiefs (1987); Saskatchewan Roughriders (1988)
- * Offseason or practice squad member only
- Stats at Pro Football Reference

John Wayne Walker (born September 12, 1961) is an American former professional football defensive tackle player. He played three games in the National Football League (NFL) for the Kansas City Chiefs in 1987. He played college football at University of Nebraska Omaha. He was drafted by the New York Jets in the 5th round (136th overall) of the 1983 NFL Draft.
