= Jon Sutton =

American football player (born 1957)

No. 34, 16, 6, 27, 26, 20
- Position: Cornerback

Personal information
- Born: January 1, 1957 (age 69); New Orleans, Louisiana, U.S.
- Listed height: 6 ft 1 in (1.85 m)
- Listed weight: 195 lb (88 kg)

Career information
- High school: Morningside (Inglewood, California)
- College: New Mexico
- NFL draft: 1979: undrafted

Career history
- Washington Redskins (1979)*; Ottawa Rough Riders (1979–1980); Toronto Argonauts (1981); Montreal Alouettes (1981); Ottawa Rough Riders (1981–1982); Philadelphia / Baltimore Stars (1983–1985); New Orleans Saints (1987); Tampa Bay Buccaneers (1987)
- * Offseason or practice squad member only

Awards and highlights
- 2× USFL champion (1984, 1985); Second-team All-USFL (1985)
- Stats at Pro Football Reference

Jonathan E. Sutton (born January 1, 1957) is an American former professional football cornerback who played in the National Football League (NFL), United States Football League (USFL), and Canadian Football League (CFL). He played college football for the New Mexico Lobos.

== Early life ==
Jonathan E. Sutton was born on January 1, 1957, in New Orleans, Louisiana. He attended Morningside High School in Inglewood, California.

== College career ==
Sutton enrolled at the University of New Mexico to play college football for the Lobos. He was a four-year letterman from 1975 to 1978.

== Professional career ==
After going undrafted in the 1979 NFL draft, Sutton signed with the Washington Redskins on May 10, 1979. He was released on August 17, after the second game of the 1979 preseason.

Sutton was signed by the Ottawa Rough Riders of the Canadian Football League (CFL) on October 10, 1979. He dressed in five games for Ottawa during the 1979 CFL season. He played in 12 games in 1980. Sutton was released on June 30, 1981, before the start of the 1981 regular season.

Sutton signed with the CFL's Toronto Argonauts on July 7, 1981. He dressed in the next three games for Toronto before being released on July 27.

On July 28, 1981, Sutton signed a 14-day trial with the Montreal Alouettes. He dressed in two games for the Alouettes and was released on August 17, 1981.

Sutton was signed by the Rough Riders again on September 1, 1981. He played in eight games for Ottawa in 1981 and 16 games in 1982. He became a free agent after the 1982 CFL season. Sutton finished his CFL career with 46 games dressed, 15 interceptions for 373 yards, two fumble recoveries, and one punt return for seven yards.

On March 15, 1983, after the second week of the 1983 USFL season, Sutton signed with the Philadelphia Stars. He played in 15 games for the Stars in 1983 and started all 18 games in 1984. Prior to the 1985 season, he signed a three-year contract with the Stars worth about $300,000. In 1985, Sutton earned second-team All-USFL honors at cornerback. He helped the Stars win the USFL championship in both 1984 and 1985. He did not play anywhere in 1986 because the fall 1986 USFL season ended up getting cancelled. Sutton finished his USFL career with 13 interceptions for 207 yards, seven fumble recoveries, and half a sack.

On September 23, 1987, Sutton signed with the New Orleans Saints during the 1987 NFL players strike. He appeared in two strike games for the Saints in a reserve role.

On October 15, 1987, Sutton was traded to the Tampa Bay Buccaneers for fourth-string halfback Paul Miles. Sutton did not play in any games for the Buccaneers.
