= Booker Russell =

American football player (1956–2000)

No. 34, 41, 32
- Position: Running back

Personal information
- Born: February 28, 1956; Belton, Texas, U.S.
- Died: March 9, 2000 (aged 44); Belton, Texas, U.S.
- Listed height: 6 ft 2 in (1.88 m)
- Listed weight: 223 lb (101 kg)

Career information
- High school: Belton (TX)
- College: Texas State
- NFL draft: 1978: undrafted

Career history
- Oakland Raiders (1978–1979); San Diego Chargers (1980); Philadelphia Eagles (1981)

Career NFL statistics
- Rushing yards: 419
- Rushing average: 4.7
- Touchdowns: 8
- Stats at Pro Football Reference

Booker Taylor Russell (February 28, 1956 – March 9, 2000) was an American professional football running back in the National Football League (NFL) who played for the Oakland Raiders, San Diego Chargers, and Philadelphia Eagles. He played college football for the Texas State Bobcats. He also played in the United States Football League (USFL) for the Philadelphia Stars.

He was charged with murdering his wife in 1985.
