= Brad Oates =

American football player (born 1953)

No. 65, 74, 72, 76
- Positions: Tackle, guard

Personal information
- Born: September 30, 1953 (age 73); Mesa, Arizona, U.S.
- Listed height: 6 ft 6 in (1.98 m)
- Listed weight: 274 lb (124 kg)

Career information
- High school: Albany (GA)
- College: Duke; BYU
- NFL draft: 1976: 3rd round, 83rd overall pick

Career history
- St. Louis Cardinals (1976–1977); Detroit Lions (1978); St. Louis Cardinals (1979–1980); Kansas City Chiefs (1980); Cincinnati Bengals (1981); Green Bay Packers (1981); Philadelphia Stars (1983–1984)

Awards and highlights
- Second-team All-American (1975)

Career NFL statistics
- Games played: 67
- Games started: 23
- Fumble recoveries: 1
- Stats at Pro Football Reference

Robert Bradley Oates (born September 30, 1953) is an American former professional football player in the National Football League (NFL) and in the United States Football League (USFL). He played college football for the BYU Cougars. Oates played in the NFL for five teams, most prominently playing for the St. Louis Cardinals from 1976 to 1977 and 1979 to 1980. He is the brother of football player Bart Oates with whom he played side-by-side on the Philadelphia Stars of the USFL.
