= Jeff Rodenberger =

American football player (born 1959)

No. 34
- Positions: Fullback, tight end

Personal information
- Born: November 3, 1959 (age 67); Quakertown, Pennsylvania, U.S.
- Listed height: 6 ft 3 in (1.91 m)
- Listed weight: 235 lb (107 kg)

Career information
- High school: Quakertown
- College: Maryland
- NFL draft: 1982: undrafted

Career history
- Philadelphia Eagles (1982)*; Houston Gamblers (1983)*; Philadelphia/Baltimore Stars (1983-1985); New Orleans Saints (1987)
- * Offseason or practice squad member only

Career NFL statistics
- Rushing yards: 35
- Rushing average: 2.1
- Receptions: 2
- Receiving yards: 17
- Stats at Pro Football Reference

Jeffery Lee Rodenberger (born November 3, 1959) is an American former professional football player who was a fullback and tight end in the National Football League (NFL) and United States Football League (USFL) from 1983 and 1987. He played college football for the Maryland Terrapins. He played in the USFL for the Philadelphia/Baltimore Stars and in the NFL for the New Orleans Saints.

== Early life and education ==
Jeff Rodenberger was born on November 3, 1959, in Quakertown, Pennsylvania, and attended Quakertown High School.

=== College ===
Rodenberger went to the University of Maryland, College Park, where he played fullback. In his career, he made 57 rushes for 205 yards and eight catches for 61 yards.

== Professional career ==
=== USFL ===
Rodenberger was originally signed by the Philadelphia Stars. He was later picked in the Houston Gamblers expansion draft, but was brought back to the Stars with some draft picks. He was converted to play tight end in the USFL. He played in 18 games in 1983 and in 1984. He also played in 1985. In his USFL career, he had 36 rushes for 173 yards and one touchdown.

=== NFL ===
After not playing in 1986, he played as a replacement player for the New Orleans Saints in 1987. He had 17 rushes for 35 yards in his 3 games. He did not play afterwards.
