= Anthony Anderson (running back) =

American football player (born 1956)

No. 33
- Position: Running back

Personal information
- Born: September 27, 1956 (age 70); Wilmington, Delaware, U.S.
- Listed height: 6 ft 0 in (1.83 m)
- Listed weight: 197 lb (89 kg)

Career information
- High school: Thomas McKean (Wilmington)
- College: Temple
- NFL draft: 1979: undrafted

Career history
- Pittsburgh Steelers (1979); Atlanta Falcons (1980); New York Giants (1982)*; Philadelphia Stars (1983); Baltimore Stars (1985)
- * Offseason or practice squad member only

Awards and highlights
- Super Bowl champion (XIV); Second-team All-East (1976); Delaware Sports Hall of Fame (1994); Temple Owls Hall of Fame (1994)

Career NFL statistics
- Rushing yards: 123
- Rushing average: 5.1
- Touchdowns: 1
- Stats at Pro Football Reference

Anthony Eugene Anderson (born September 27, 1956) is an American former professional football player who was a running back in the National Football League (NFL). He played college football for the Temple Owls. He played for two seasons in the NFL for the Pittsburgh Steelers, where he won a Super Bowl ring in Super Bowl XIV against the Los Angeles Rams, and also played with the Atlanta Falcons. Anderson played for the Philadelphia Stars of the United States Football League (USFL) in the 1983 season.

== Playing career ==
Anderson attended Thomas McKean High School where he was a two-time All-Stater. In 1994, Anderson was inducted into the Delaware Sports Hall of Fame and was also inducted into Temple University Hall of Fame. Anderson was at the time the second leading ground-gainer in Temple football history. Anderson earned the All-East and All-American awards while at Temple.

As part of the nationwide kickoff to the Super Bowl 50 celebration, the NFL launched today the Super Bowl High School Honor Roll initiative recognizing schools and communities that contributed to Super Bowl history and positively impacted the game of football. On January 11, 2016, Anderson received this honor at Thomas McKean High School. That night, the high school also retired his jersey number.

== Personal life ==
Anderson owns a construction company in Delaware and does motivational speaking engagements. Anderson had a small role in the made-for-TV movie, Fighting Back, a story about Rocky Bleier. Anthony Anderson has a son named Anthony Brown who was a running back that played football for Wesley College in Dover, Delaware
