= Allen Harvin =

American football player (born 1959)

No. 31
- Position: Running back

Personal information
- Born: March 18, 1959 (age 67); Philadelphia, Pennsylvania, U.S.
- Listed height: 5 ft 9 in (1.75 m)
- Listed weight: 200 lb (91 kg)

Career information
- High school: Willingboro (NJ)
- College: Cincinnati
- NFL draft: 1983: undrafted

Career history
- Philadelphia / Baltimore Stars (1983–1985); Washington Redskins (1987)

Career NFL statistics
- Games played: 1
- Games started: 0
- Stats at Pro Football Reference

Allen Nathaniel Harvin (born March 18, 1959) is an American football running back who played in the National Football League (NFL) for the Washington Redskins during the 1987 NFL season. He played college football at Cincinnati. Harvin also played in the United States Football League (USFL) with the Philadelphia Stars from 1983 to 1984 and the Baltimore Stars in 1985.

In 2018, Harvin was awarded a Super Bowl ring for playing for the Redskins in 1987, the year they won Super Bowl XXII.
