= 1978 All-East football team =

American college football all-star team

The 1978 All-East football team consists of American football players chosen by various selectors as the best players at each position among the Eastern colleges and universities during the 1978 NCAA Division I-A football season.

== Offense ==
=== Quarterback ===
- Chuck Fusina, Penn State (AP-1; UPI-1)

=== Running backs ===
- Joseph H. Holland, Cornell (AP-1; UPI-1)
- Matt Suhey, Penn State (AP-1; UPI-1)
- Jeff Dufresne, Dartmouth (UPI-1)
- Zachary Dixon, Temple (AP-2)

=== Tight end ===
- Clennie Brundidge, Army (AP-1)
- John Spagnola, Yale (UPI-1)

=== Wide receivers ===
- Gordon Jones, Pitt (AP-1; UPI-1)
- Scott Fitzkee, Penn State (AP-1)

=== Tackles ===
- Keith Dorney, Penn State (AP-1; UPI-1)
- Craig Wolfley, Syracuse (AP-1)
- John Gallo, Rutgers (UPI-1)
- Collin McCarty, Temple (AP-2)

=== Guards ===
- Matt Carroll, Pitt (AP-1; UPI-1)
- Bob Brewer, Temple (AP-2; UPI-1)
- Bob Hurley, Holy Cross (AP-1)

=== Center ===
- Chuck Correal, Penn State (AP-1)
- Chuck Johnston, Army (UPI-1)

=== Placekicker ===
- Matt Bahr, Penn State (UPI-1)

== Defense ==
=== Ends ===
- Hugh Green, Pitt (AP-1; UPI-1)
- Chuck Schott, Army (AP-1)
- Clint Streit, Yale (UPI-1)
- Larry Kubin, Penn State (AP-2)

=== Tackles ===
- Bruce Clark, Penn State (AP-1; UPI-1)
- Matt Millen, Penn State (AP-1; UPI-1)

=== Middle guard ===
- Ed Steward, Rutgers (AP-1)
- Pete Funke, Princeton (UPI-1)
- David Logan, Pitt (AP-2)

=== Linebackers ===
- Al Chesley, Pitt (AP-1; UPI-1)
- Lance Mehl, Penn State (AP-1)
- Jim Collins, Syracuse (AP-1)
- Bill Crowley, Yale (UPI-1)
- Tom Kuchar, Dartmouth (UPI-1)

=== Defensive backs ===
- Jeff Delaney, Pitt (AP-1; UPI-1)
- Pete Harris, Penn State (AP-1; UPI-1)
- Gregg Milo, Navy (AP-1; UPI-1)

== Key ==
- AP = Associated Press
- UPI = United Press International

== See also ==
- 1978 College Football All-America Team
