= Mike Lush =

American football player (born 1958)

No. 27, 28, 34
- Position: Defensive back

Personal information
- Born: April 18, 1958 (age 68); Allentown, Pennsylvania, U.S.
- Listed height: 6 ft 2 in (1.88 m)
- Listed weight: 195 lb (88 kg)

Career information
- High school: William Allen (Allentown)
- College: East Stroudsburg
- NFL draft: 1981: undrafted

Career history
- Philadelphia Eagles (1981)*; Philadelphia Stars (1983–1984); Baltimore Stars (1985); Indianapolis Colts (1986); Minnesota Vikings (1986); Chicago Bears (1987)*; Atlanta Falcons (1987)
- * Offseason or practice squad member only
- Stats at Pro Football Reference

Mike Lush (born April 18, 1958) is an American former professional football player who was a defensive back in the National Football League (NFL). He played college football for the East Stroudsburg Warriors.

== Early life and education ==
Lush played football at William Allen High School in Allentown, Pennsylvania, and then East Stroudsburg University.

== Career ==
From 1983 to 1985, he played for the Philadelphia / Baltimore Stars prior to entering the NFL, where he played with the Indianapolis Colts and Minnesota Vikings in 1986 and the Atlanta Falcons in 1987.
