= Pete Harris (American football) =

American football player (1957–2006)

Profile
- Position: Defensive back

Personal information
- Born: April 7, 1957; Mount Holly, New Jersey, U.S.
- Died: August 9, 2006 (aged 49); West Palm Beach, Florida, U.S.

Career information
- High school: Rancocas Valley Regional (Mount Holly, New Jersey)
- College: Penn State (1978)

Awards and highlights
- First-team All-American (1978); 2× First-team All-East (1978, 1980)

Piero "Pete" Harris (April 7, 1957 – August 9, 2006) was an American football player.

== Biography ==
One of nine children, Harris grew up in Mount Holly, New Jersey, and played high school football at Rancocas Valley Regional High School. He was named an All-American safety at Penn State University in 1978, when he led the nation with 10 interceptions. He is the younger brother of Pro Football Hall of Famer Franco Harris.

Harris died in West Palm Beach, Florida. At the time of his death, he was executive chef at PGA National Resort and Spa in Palm Beach Gardens, Florida.
