= Chuck Commiskey =

American football player (born 1958)

No. 66, 69, 55
- Position: Guard / Center

Personal information
- Born: March 2, 1958 (age 68); Killeen, Texas, U.S.
- Listed height: 6 ft 4 in (1.93 m)
- Listed weight: 290 lb (132 kg)

Career information
- College: Ole Miss
- NFL draft: 1981: 9th round, 247th overall pick

Career history
- Philadelphia Eagles (1981); Philadelphia/Baltimore Stars (1983–1985); New Orleans Saints (1986–1988)

Awards and highlights
- Second-team USFL All-Time Team; All-USFL (1984)

Career NFL statistics
- Games played: 34
- Games started: 14
- Stats at Pro Football Reference

Charles Edward Commiskey (born March 2, 1958) is an American former professional football player who was a guard and center for three seasons in the National Football League (NFL) for the New Orleans Saints from 1986–1988. He also played for three seasons in the United States Football League (USFL) for the Philadelphia/Baltimore Stars from 1983–1985. He was selected by the Philadelphia Eagles in the ninth round of the 1981 NFL draft. He played college football for the Ole Miss Rebels.

== College career ==
On August 15, 1978, Ole Miss Rebels football head coach Steve Sloan announced that Commiskey would be suspended for the entire 1978 season for disciplinary reasons.

== Professional career ==
=== Philadelphia Eagles ===
Commiskey was selected 247th overall by the Philadelphia Eagles in the ninth round of the 1981 NFL draft. He was placed on injured reserve on August 25, 1981. He was waived on September 6, 1982.

=== Philadelphia/Baltimore Stars ===
After being released from the Eagles, Commiskey signed with the Philadelphia Stars of the United States Football League in 1983. In 1984, he was named to the USFL All-League Team. He played with the Stars until 1985 when the league folded. He was named second-team to the USFL All-Time Team.

=== New Orleans Saints ===
Commiskey was signed by the New Orleans Saints following the fold of the USFL in 1986. He was re-signed to a two-year contract on March 29, 1988.
