= Jim Krohn =

American gridiron football player (born 1957)

No. 10, 11
- Position: Quarterback

Personal information
- Born: July 27, 1957 (age 69); Tucson, Arizona, U.S.
- Listed height: 6 ft 3 in (1.91 m)
- Listed weight: 195 lb (88 kg)

Career information
- High school: Amphitheater (Tucson)
- College: Arizona (1976–1979)
- NFL draft: 1980: undrafted

Career history
- Winnipeg Blue Bombers (1980); Philadelphia Eagles (1982)*; Philadelphia Stars (1983)
- * Offseason or practice squad member only

Jim Krohn (born July 27, 1957) is an American former professional football quarterback in the Canadian Football League (CFL) and USFL who played for the Winnipeg Blue Bombers and Philadelphia Stars. He played college football for the Arizona Wildcats. His son, Jeff Krohn, played college football for the Arizona State Sun Devils and UMass Minutemen.
