= Philadelphia Stars =

Philadelphia Stars may refer to:

- Philadelphia Stars (baseball), a baseball team in the Negro leagues from 1933 to 1952
- Philadelphia/Baltimore Stars, an American football team in the United States Football League from 1983 to 1984, after which they became the Baltimore Stars for their final season in 1985
- Philadelphia Stars (2022), an American football team in the revived United States Football League from 2022 to 2023
