= Mark McCants =

American football player (born 1958)

Mark A. McCants
No. 20
- Positions: Safety, return specialist

Personal information
- Born: February 17, 1958 (age 68); Quakertown, Pennsylvania, U.S.
- Listed height: 6 ft 0 in (1.83 m)
- Listed weight: 193 lb (88 kg)

Career information
- High school: Louis E. Dieruff (Allentown, Pennsylvania)
- College: Temple
- NFL draft: 1981: 12th round, 330th overall pick

Career history
- Atlanta Falcons (1981)*; Philadelphia/Baltimore Stars (1983–1985)
- * Offseason or practice squad member only

Mark Anthony McCants (born February 17, 1958) is an American former football safety and return specialist who played three seasons for the Philadelphia/Baltimore Stars of the United States Football League (USFL). He was originally drafted by the Atlanta Falcons in the 12th round (330th overall) in the 1981 NFL draft.

On November 7, 2023, McCants was elected to a six year term as a Magisterial District Judge in Lehigh County, Pennsylvania.
