= Frank Case (American football) =

American football player (born 1958)

No. 95
- Position: Defensive end

Personal information
- Born: August 14, 1958 (age 68); Jacksonville, North Carolina, U.S.
- Listed height: 6 ft 4 in (1.93 m)
- Listed weight: 243 lb (110 kg)

Career information
- High school: Central Bucks West (Doylestown, Pennsylvania)
- College: Penn State
- NFL draft: 1981: 11th round, 289th overall pick

Career history
- Kansas City Chiefs (1981); Philadelphia Stars (1983); San Antonio Gunslingers (1984)
- Stats at Pro Football Reference

Francis D. Case (born August 14, 1958) is an American former professional football player who was a defensive end for the Kansas City Chiefs of the National Football League (NFL). He played college football for the Penn State Nittany Lions. He also played professionally in the United States Football League (USFL).
