= Tom Donovan (American football) =

American football player (born 1957)

No. 86, 87
- Position: Wide receiver

Personal information
- Born: January 13, 1957 (age 69); Queens, New York, U.S.
- Listed height: 5 ft 11 in (1.80 m)
- Listed weight: 179 lb (81 kg)

Career information
- High school: Holy Family
- College: Penn State
- NFL draft: 1980: 9th round, 230th overall pick

Career history
- Kansas City Chiefs (1980)*; New Orleans Saints (1980); New York Giants (1981)*; Chicago Bears (1981)*; Philadelphia Stars (1983–1984); Baltimore Stars (1985)
- * Offseason or practice squad member only
- Stats at Pro Football Reference

Thomas Edward Donovan (born January 13, 1957) is an American former professional football player who was a wide receiver in the National Football League (NFL) and United States Football League (USFL). He played in the NFL for the New Orleans Saints for a season in 1980. He played in the USFL for the Philadelphia Stars and Baltimore Stars between 1983 and 1985.

Donovan played college football for the Penn State Nittany Lions. He was a ninth-round pick (pick #230) in the 1980 NFL draft, selected by the Kansas City Chiefs. The Chiefs traded him to the Saints. He was delisted at the end of the 1980 season.

In 1983 he was drafted by the Philadelphia Stars in the USFL’s inaugural season, where the Stars won their division and played in the USFL championship game. He caught 37 passes for 559 yards and 6 receiving touchdowns in his USFL career.
