= Brad Anae =

American football player (born 1956)

No. 64
- Position: Defensive end / Defensive tackle

Personal information
- Born: October 3, 1956 (age 70); Compton, California, U.S.
- Listed height: 6 ft 5 in (1.96 m)
- Listed weight: 250 lb (113 kg)

Career information
- High school: Kahuku (Kahuku, Hawaii)
- College: BYU
- NFL draft: 1982: undrafted

Career history
- Philadelphia Eagles (1982)*; Philadelphia Stars (1982–1983); Houston Gamblers (1984); San Antonio Gunslingers (1985)
- * Offseason or practice squad member only

Brad Anae (born October 3, 1957) is an American former football defensive end who played three seasons in the United States Football League (USFL) with the Philadelphia Stars, Houston Gamblers, and San Antonio Gunslingers. He first enrolled at the University of Hawaii before transferring to the Brigham Young University.

== Early life ==
Anae played high school football at Kahuku High & Intermediate School in Kahuku, Hawaii. He was named to state all-star teams and was team captain while the Red Raiders' record during his three varsity years was 21–10.

== College career ==
Anae first played college football in 1976 for the Hawaii Rainbow Warriors of the University of Hawaii. He transferred to play for the BYU Cougars, He was a two-year starter for the Cougars, earning All-WAC honors in 1980 and 1981. Anae also earned third team All-American honors in 1981, starting in the Holiday Bowl, and honorable mention All-American honors in 1980.

== Professional career ==
Anae signed with the Philadelphia Eagles of the National Football League in 1982. He joined the Philadelphia Stars of the USFL late in 1982 and played in three games for the team in 1983. He played for the USFL's Houston Gamblers in 1984. Anae was signed by the San Antonio Gunslingers of the USFL on November 23, 1984. He played in eight games for the Gunslingers, starting five.

== Personal life ==
Anae's father, Famika, and brothers Robert and Matt also played for the BYU Cougars. Robert's son, Famika, was an offensive lineman for the Cougars before ending his career due to injures in 2012. Anae's son, Bradlee, was drafted as a defensive end for the Dallas Cowboys and since September 8, 2025, plays for the Canadian Football League.
