= George Cooper (linebacker) =

American football player (born 1958)

No. 56, 52
- Position: Linebacker

Personal information
- Born: December 24, 1958 (age 67); Detroit, Michigan, U.S.
- Listed height: 6 ft 2 in (1.88 m)
- Listed weight: 225 lb (102 kg)

Career information
- High school: Northern (Detroit)
- College: Michigan State
- NFL draft: 1982: undrafted

Career history
- Pittsburgh Steelers (1982)*; Philadelphia/Baltimore Stars (1983–1985); San Francisco 49ers (1987); Kansas City Chiefs (1989)*
- * Offseason or practice squad member only

Awards and highlights
- 2× USFL champion (1984, 1985)
- Stats at Pro Football Reference

George Junious Cooper (born December 24, 1958) is an American former professional football linebacker who played for the San Francisco 49ers of the National Football League (NFL). He played college football and basketball for the Michigan State Spartans.

== Early life ==
George Junious Cooper was born on December 24, 1958, in Detroit, Michigan. He attended Northern High School in Detroit.

== College career ==
Cooper enrolled at Michigan State University to play college football for the Spartans. He was a four-year football letterman from 1978 to 1981. He was a team captain for the Michigan State football team in 1980 and 1981. Cooper was one of only four players in school history to be a team captain for multiple seasons. He also played in three games for the basketball team during the 1980–81 season, averaging 2.7 points and 0.3 rebounds per game.

== Professional career ==
After going undrafted in the 1982 NFL draft, Cooper signed with the Pittsburgh Steelers on May 22. He was released on August 30, 1982.

On September 27, 1982, Cooper signed with the Philadelphia Stars of the upstart United States Football League for the 1983 USFL season. He played in 13 games, starting five, at outside linebacker for the Stars in 1983, posting 0.5 sacks, one interception for 16 yards, and one fumble recovery. The Stars advanced to the 1983 USFL championship game, where they lost to the Michigan Panthers by a score of 24–22. Cooper started all 18 games for Philadelphia in 1984, recording six sacks for 52 yards, two interceptions for ten yards, and one fumble recovery. The Stars finished the 1984 season with a 16–2 record and beat the Arizona Wranglers in the 1984 USFL championship game 23–3. He appeared in all 18 games for the newly-renamed Baltimore Stars in 1985, totaling 4.0 sacks for 30 yards, two interceptions for six yards, and two fumble recoveries. The Stars went 10–7–1 and won the 1985 USFL championship game by a margin of 28–24 over the Oakland Invaders. The USFL folded after the 1985 season.

Cooper was signed by the San Francisco 49ers on May 20, 1987. He missed three regular season games due to the 1987 NFL players strike. He was placed on injured reserve on November 21, released on December 15, and re-signed on December 18. Cooper played in ten games overall, starting two, for the 49ers during the 1987 season. He also appeared in one playoff game in a reserve role. He was released by San Francisco on August 30, 1988, after the final game of the 1988 preseason.

Cooper signed with the Kansas City Chiefs on February 16, 1989. He was released on August 15, 1989, after the first preseason game.
