= Booker Moore =

American football player (1959–2009)

No. 34
- Position: Running back

Personal information
- Born: June 23, 1959; Flint, Michigan, U.S.
- Died: September 20, 2009 (aged 50); Flint, Michigan, U.S.
- Listed height: 5 ft 11 in (1.80 m)
- Listed weight: 224 lb (102 kg)

Career information
- High school: Flint Southwestern Academy
- College: Penn State
- NFL draft: 1981: 1st round, 28th overall pick

Career history
- Buffalo Bills (1982–1985); Detroit Lions (1986)*
- * Offseason or practice squad member only

Career NFL statistics
- Rushing yards: 420
- Yards per carry: 3.7
- Rushing touchdowns: 1
- Receptions: 75
- Receiving yards: 423
- Receiving touchdowns: 1
- Stats at Pro Football Reference

Booker Thomas Moore (June 23, 1959 – September 20, 2009) was an American professional football player who was a running back for the Buffalo Bills of the National Football League (NFL).

Moore set six high school records in football while attending Flint Southwestern Academy in Flint, Michigan. As a member of the Penn State Nittany Lions, Moore rushed for 2,072 yards and 20 touchdowns from 1977 to 1980, and played for a national championship in the 1979 Sugar Bowl versus Alabama.

Moore was selected 28th overall in the first round by the Buffalo Bills in the 1981 NFL draft. He played four seasons for the Bills, appearing in 51 games from 1982 to 1985. Moore did not start in his rookie season, but he did manage to rush for 38 yards on 16 attempts. In his second season he started 11 games for the Bills. In a 28–23 loss to the Baltimore Colts Moore rushed for 53 yards on 12 attempts, taking over for starter Roosevelt Leaks. Though he would start 15 games the next season, his production went down, only getting 84 yards on 24 attempts. He would not score a rushing touchdown until 1985, his final season. His touchdown was the lone score for Buffalo in 17–7 loss to the Cleveland Browns. Moore had scored the go-ahead touchdown in the first half, but the Bills defense allowed 10 unanswered points, including an 11-yard pass from Bernie Kosar to Ozzie Newsome in the fourth quarter that sealed the game. He was diagnosed with Guillain–Barré syndrome shortly after being drafted.

Upon retirement in 1986, Moore became a Genesee County, Michigan, sheriff's deputy. He died of a heart attack at his home in Flint on September 20, 2009.
