= Eric Cunningham (American football) =

American football player (1957–1995)

No. 68
- Position: Guard

Personal information
- Born: March 16, 1957; Akron, Ohio, U.S.
- Died: January 22, 1995 (aged 37); New Haven, Connecticut, U.S.
- Listed height: 6 ft 3 in (1.91 m)
- Listed weight: 257 lb (117 kg)

Career information
- High school: South (Akron)
- College: Penn State
- NFL draft: 1979: 4th round, 96th overall pick

Career history
- New York Jets (1979); St. Louis Cardinals (1980)*; New York Jets (1980)
- * Offseason or practice squad member only
- Stats at Pro Football Reference

Eric Allan Cunningham (March 16, 1957 – January 22, 1995) was an American professional football offensive lineman in the National Football League (NFL) who played for the New York Jets. He played college football at Penn State University.

== Early life ==
Cunningham attended at South High School in Akron, Ohio.

== College career ==
Cunningham attended and played college football at the Penn State from 1975 to 1978.

== Professional career ==
Cunningham was selected in the fourth round (#96 overall) of the 1979 NFL draft by the New York Jets.

== Personal life ==
Cunningham died at the age of 37 on January 22, 1995, in New Haven, Connecticut.
