= Scott Woerner =

American football player (born 1958)

No. 30, 24, 25
- Position: Safety

Personal information
- Born: December 18, 1958 (age 67); Baytown, Texas, U.S.
- Listed height: 6 ft 0 in (1.83 m)
- Listed weight: 190 lb (86 kg)

Career information
- High school: Jonesboro (Jonesboro, Georgia)
- College: Georgia
- NFL draft: 1981: 3rd round, 80th overall pick

Career history
- Atlanta Falcons (1981); Philadelphia Stars (1983-1985); New Orleans Saints (1987)

Awards and highlights
- All-USFL (1983); National champion (1980); First-team All-American (1980); 2× First-team All-SEC (1979, 1980)

Career NFL statistics
- Fumble recoveries: 1
- Stats at Pro Football Reference
- College Football Hall of Fame

Scott Allison Woerner (born December 18, 1958) is an American former professional football player who was a safety in the National Football League (NFL) for the Atlanta Falcons and the New Orleans Saints. He played college football for the University of Georgia Bulldogs. In the 1981 Sugar Bowl, Woerner intercepted a pass by the Notre Dame quarterback Blair Kiel in the closing minutes of the game which sealed Georgia's national championship for that year. He still holds several return records at the University of Georgia. He had the most kickoff return yards (190) in a single game (vs. Kentucky, 1977). He also holds the most punt return yards (488) in a season (1980). Woerner was selected 80th overall in the third round of the 1981 NFL draft by the Falcons. He played for the Atlanta Falcons during that 1981 season and was their leading punt returner. The Falcons cut him before the start of the 1982 season. In 1983, 1984, and 1985 he played safety for the Philadelphia Stars of the short-lived United States Football League (USFL). The Philadelphia Stars won 2 of the 3 USFL championships. The Sporting News selected him as a USFL All-League player both of those seasons. Woerner played briefly for the New Orleans Saints during the NFL Players Strike.

After retiring from pro football, Woerner became a physical education teacher.

== See also ==
- List of NCAA major college yearly punt and kickoff return leaders
