= Bart Oates =

American football player (born 1958)

No. 50, 65, 66
- Position: Center

Personal information
- Born: December 16, 1958 (age 67); Mesa, Arizona, U.S.
- Listed height: 6 ft 4 in (1.93 m)
- Listed weight: 275 lb (125 kg)

Career information
- High school: Albany (Albany, Georgia)
- College: BYU
- NFL draft: 1983: undrafted

Career history
- Philadelphia/Baltimore Stars (1983–1985); New York Giants (1985–1993); San Francisco 49ers (1994–1995)

Awards and highlights
- 3× Super Bowl champion (XXI, XXV, XXIX); 5× Pro Bowl (1990, 1991, 1993–1995); PFWA All-Rookie Team (1985); 41st greatest New York Giant of all-time; 2× USFL Championship (1984, 1985); Second-team All-American (1982)

Career NFL statistics
- Games played: 172
- Games started: 165
- Fumble recoveries: 3
- Stats at Pro Football Reference

Bart Steven Oates (born December 16, 1958) is an American former professional football player who was a center in the National Football League (NFL) for the New York Giants and San Francisco 49ers. He played for the Giants from 1985 to 1993 and with the 49ers from 1994 to 1995. He was a member of the Giants teams that won Super Bowls XXI and XXV and the 49ers team that won Super Bowl XXIX. He is one of two players (along with Sean Landeta) to be on both a Super Bowl-winning team and a team that won a championship in the original United States Football League (USFL).

== College career ==
A graduate of Albany High School in Georgia, Oates played college football at Brigham Young University (BYU), originally entering in 1977 before serving an 2-year mission for the Church of Jesus Christ of Latter-day Saints in Las Vegas, Nevada then later joining the Cougars football team. Oates earned a BS in accounting from the Marriott School of Business there in 1985, and he was inducted into the BYU athletic Hall of Fame in 1992.

== Professional career ==
The Giants signed Oates in 1985 at the relatively advanced age of 26. This was because he had initially played three seasons with the Philadelphia/Baltimore Stars in the USFL where he won two USFL championships and started 61 of 63 games played Oates has stated that he feels the 1985 Philadelphia Stars of the USFL could have beaten the 1985 Philadelphia Eagles. Oates won three Super Bowls, two with the Giants in 1987 and 1991, and one with the 49ers in 1995. Oates was selected to five Pro Bowls during his career and to the UPI All-NFC team three times. He was extremely durable, starting 125 consecutive games during his Giants career.

== Television work ==
Oates worked as a color analyst for NFL games on NBC television in 1996, teaming with either Dan Hicks or, when Hicks was away on assignment, Jim Donovan. In 2006, he voiced himself in the Aqua Teen Hunger Force episode "Bart Oates".

== Law career ==
Oates attended law school classes during the football off-season and graduated magna cum laude with a Juris Doctor degree from Seton Hall Law School in 1990. He worked in New Jersey with the firms of Ribis Graham and Curtin in Morristown, Raymond Koski and Associates in Fort Lee and the real estate company Gale and Wentworth in Florham Park and is a member of the firm Reppert Oates & Vytell in Basking Ridge NJ. He is a member of the New Jersey State Bar Association.

== Civic and corporate roles ==
Oates was chairman of the New Jersey Hall of Fame, a Hall of Fame for New Jersey residents in a variety of fields ranging from scientists to athletes. He was selected to be inducted into the New Jersey Hall of Fame Class of 2019. He also spent time helping out as the line coach at Seton Hall Preparatory School earlier in the decade. He served as the Bishop (lay Pastor) of the Morristown 1st Ward of the Church of Jesus Christ of Latter Day Saints.

== Personal life ==
Oates and his wife, Michelle, have three children and reside in Harding Township, New Jersey. His brother, Brad, also played offensive line in the NFL for six seasons on five teams. The two played together on the Philadelphia Stars of the USFL from 1983-1984.

== See also ==
- History of the New York Giants (1979–93)
