= Chuck Fusina =

American football player (born 1957)

No. 14, 4
- Position: Quarterback

Personal information
- Born: May 31, 1957 (age 69); Pittsburgh, Pennsylvania, U.S.
- Listed height: 6 ft 1 in (1.85 m)
- Listed weight: 197 lb (89 kg)

Career information
- High school: Sto-Rox (McKees Rocks, Pennsylvania)
- College: Penn State (1975–1978)
- NFL draft: 1979: 5th round, 133rd overall pick

Career history
- Tampa Bay Buccaneers (1979–1981); Philadelphia / Baltimore Stars (1983–1985); Green Bay Packers (1986)

Awards and highlights
- 2× USFL champion (1984, 1985); USFL Championship Game MVP (1984); USFL Most Outstanding Quarterback (1984); Maxwell Award (1978); Unanimous All-American (1978); First-team All-East (1978); Pennsylvania Sports Hall of Fame

Career NFL statistics
- Passing attempts: 37
- Passing completions: 22
- Completion percentage: 59.5%
- TD–INT: 1–2
- Passing yards: 198
- Passer rating: 60.4
- Stats at Pro Football Reference

Charles Anthony Fusina (born May 31, 1957) is an American former professional football player who was a quarterback for seven seasons in the National Football League (NFL) and United States Football League (USFL) from 1979 to 1986. He played college football for the Penn State Nittany Lions, and was recognized as a unanimous All-American in 1978. Fusina played for the Tampa Bay Buccaneers and the Green Bay Packers of the NFL, and the Philadelphia / Baltimore Stars of the USFL.

== Early life ==
Fusina was born in Pittsburgh, Pennsylvania. He played quarterback for the Pittsburgh area Sto-Rox High School in McKees Rocks, Pennsylvania, where his old football jersey is on display outside of the gymnasium.

== College career ==
Fusina capped an outstanding career at Penn State University by winning the 1978 Maxwell Award, All-America honors, and was the runner-up in the Heisman Trophy balloting. He led the Nittany Lions to a 29–3 (.906) mark as a starter, including an 11–0 regular season in 1978. He passed for 1,859 yards and 11 touchdowns.

Fusina earned a Bachelor of Science in Marketing from Penn State in 1979. He also earned an MBA from La Salle University in 1988.

=== College statistics ===
Legend
	Led Independents
	NCAA record
	Led the NCAA
**Bold**	Career high

Year	Team	GP	Passing							Rushing			
Year	Team	GP	Cmp	Att	Pct	Yds	TD	Int	Rtg	Att	Yds	Avg	TD
1975	Penn State	3	4	9	44.4	42	0	**1**	61.4	8	**37**	**4.6**	0
1976	Penn State	**11**	88	167	52.7	1,260	11	10	125.8	31	-88	-2.8	**3**
1977	Penn State	**11**	**142**	**246**	**57.7**	**2,221**	**15**	9	**146.4**	29	-53	-1.8	1
1978	Penn State	**11**	137	242	56.6	1,859	11	12	126.2	**51**	-116	-2.3	2
Career		36	371	664	55.9	5,382	37	32	132.7	119	-220	-1.8	6

* Includes bowl games.

== Professional career ==
At 6'1" 195-lb., Fusina was a 5th round draft pick (#133 overall) of the Tampa Bay Buccaneers in the 1979 NFL draft. He spent his first three professional seasons as back-up to Doug Williams. In 1983, he left for the fledgling USFL. Fusina signed with the Philadelphia/Baltimore Stars where he blossomed under coach Jim Mora. In his three seasons with the team, he passed for over 10,000 yards in the USFL with 66 touchdowns and a QB rating of 88.6 and led the Stars to back-to-back USFL titles in 1984 and 1985. He was named MVP of the 1984 USFL Championship Game. When the league folded in August 1986, Fusina returned to the NFL for one season with the Green Bay Packers.

=== Regular season ===
Year	Team	Games		Passing							
Year	Team	GP	Record	Cmp	Att	Pct	Yds	Avg	TD	Int	Rtg
1983	Philadelphia/Baltimore Stars	18	15–3	238	421	56.5	2,718	6.5	15	10	78.1
1984	Philadelphia/Baltimore Stars	18	16–2	302	465	64.9	3,837	8.3	31	9	104.7
1985	Philadelphia/Baltimore Stars	18	10–7-1	303	496	61.1	3,496	7.0	20	14	84.0
Career		54	41-12-1	843	1,382	61.0	10,051	7.3	66	33	

==== Postseason ====
Year	Team	Games		Passing						
Year	Team	GP	Record	Cmp	Att	Pct	Yds	Avg	TD	Int
1983	Philadelphia/Baltimore Stars	2	1–1	47	80	58.75	446	5.6	5	4
1984	Philadelphia/Baltimore Stars	3	3-0	36	58	6.1	414	7.1	1	1
1985	Philadelphia/Baltimore Stars	3	3–0	35	62	56.5	463	7.5	4	4
Career		8	7–1	118	200	59.0	1323	6.6	10	9

== Personal life ==
Fusina has been an instructor at the Gus Purcell Quarterback School in Charlotte, North Carolina. He and his wife, Jacquelyn live in Pittsburgh Pennsylvania, and his children Matt and Shannon currently live in Washington, DC.

== Hall of Fame ==
In 2015 Fusina was elected to the Pennsylvania Sports Hall of Fame (PSHF) along with his head coach Joe Paterno and teammate, kicker Matt Bahr.
