= Don Fielder =

American football player (born 1959)

No. 96, 65
- Position: Defensive end

Personal information
- Born: October 20, 1959 (age 67); Las Cruces, New Mexico, U.S.
- Listed height: 6 ft 3 in (1.91 m)
- Listed weight: 260 lb (118 kg)

Career information
- High school: Rancho Alamitos (Garden Grove, California)
- College: Kentucky
- NFL draft: 1982: undrafted

Career history
- Pittsburgh Steelers (1982)*; Philadelphia/Baltimore Stars (1983–1985); Tampa Bay Buccaneers (1985–1986)
- * Offseason or practice squad member only

Awards and highlights
- 2× USFL champion (1984, 1985); Second-team All-SEC (1981)
- Stats at Pro Football Reference

Donald Sinclair Fielder (born October 20, 1959) is an American former professional football defensive end who played for the Tampa Bay Buccaneers of the National Football League (NFL). He played college football for the Kentucky Wildcats.

== Early life ==
Donald Sinclair Fielder was born on October 20, 1959, in Las Cruces, New Mexico. He attended Rancho Alamitos High School in Garden Grove, California.

== College career ==
Fielder played junior college football at Golden West College from 1977 to 1978. He transferred to the University of Kentucky to play college football for the Wildcats. He was a letterman in 1979 and 1980. Fielder missed the 1980 season due to disciplinary reasons. He earned Associated Press second-team All-SEC honors as a senior in 1981. He was the Wildcats' fourth-leading tackler during the 1981 season.

== Professional career ==
After going undrafted in the 1982 NFL draft, Fielder signed with the Pittsburgh Steelers on May 5. He was released on August 10, 1982, before the first preseason game.

On October, 1982, Fielder signed with the Philadelphia Stars of the upstart United States Football League for the 1983 USFL season. He started all 18 games for the Stars in 1983, recording 8.5 sacks for 45.5 yards and one fumble recovery. The Stars went 15–3 and advanced to the 1983 USFL championship game, where they lost to the Michigan Panthers by a score of 24–22. He played in all 18 games for the second consecutive season, starting 17, in 1984, posting six sacks for 51 yards. The Stars finished the 1984 season with a 16–2 record and beat the Arizona Wranglers in the 1984 USFL championship game 23–3. Fielder appeared in 17 games for the newly-renamed Baltimore Stars in 1985 and made nine sacks for 71.5 yards. The Stars went 10–7–1 and won the 1985 USFL championship game by a margin of 28–24 over the Oakland Invaders. The USFL folded after the 1985 season.

Fielder was signed by the Tampa Bay Buccaneers on August 7, 1985. He played in 11 games for the Buccaneers during the 1985 NFL season as a reserve defensive end, posting one sack. He was placed on injured reserve on November 27, 1985. On August 18, 1986, Fielder was placed on injured reserve again, missing the entire season. He became a free agent after the 1986 season.
