= Kit Cartwright =

American football player and coach (born 1954)

Biographical details
- Born: January 4, 1954 (age 72)

Playing career
- 1975: Bowling Green
- Position: Defensive back

Coaching career (HC unless noted)
- 1976: Toledo (GA)
- 1977: Ohio Wesleyan (DC)
- 1978: Penn State (part-time assistant)
- 1979–1982: Bowling Green (DB)
- 1983–1985: Bowling Green (WR/DB)
- 1987–1988: Eastern Illinois (OC)
- 1989–1992: Colorado State (assistant)
- 1993: Ball State (OC)
- 1994–1995: Michigan (QB/WR)
- 1996: Indiana (PCG)
- 1998–2001: Butler (OC)
- 2002–2005: Butler
- 2006: DePauw (OC)
- 2007–2008: Winnipeg Blue Bombers (OC/QB)
- 2009: Indiana (QC)
- 2010: Indiana (DFO)

Head coaching record
- Overall: 7–36

Kit Cartwright (born January 4, 1954) is former American football coach. He served as the head football coach at Butler University from 2002 to 2005. After compiling a 7–36 record at Butler, he was fired as the school's head football coach, effective at the end of the 2005 season.

Cartwright is a native of Toledo, Ohio. He attended Bowling Green State University, where he played defensive back as a walk-on under head coach Don Nehlen. He graduated from Bowling Green in 1976. Since that time, Cartwright has been a football coach at 13 different universities, including Toledo (graduate assistant, 1976), Ohio Wesleyan (defensive coordinator, 1977), Penn State (part-time assistant, 1978), Bowling Green (defensive secondary coach, 1979-1982), Purdue (defensive secondary and receivers coach, 1983–1986), Eastern Illinois (offensive coordinator, 1987–1988), Colorado State (1989–1992), Ball State (offensive coordinator, 1993), Michigan (quarterback and receivers coach, 1994–1995), and Indiana (passing game coordinator, 1996), Butler (offensive coordinator, 1998–2001; head coach, 2002–2005), and DePauw (offensive coordinator, 2006). He was the position coach for future NFL quarterbacks Tom Brady and Brian Griese while at Michigan. He was also the offensive coordinator and quarterbacks coach for the Winnipeg Blue Bombers in the Canadian Football League from 2007 to 2008.

== Head coaching record ==
Year	Team	Overall	Conference	Standing	Bowl/playoffs
Butler Bulldogs (Pioneer Football League) (2002–2005)
2002	Butler	4–6	2–2	3rd (North)	
2003	Butler	2–9	1–3	T–4th (North)	
2004	Butler	1–10	0–4	5th (North)	
2005	Butler	0–11	0–4	5th (North)	
Butler:		7–36	3–13		
Total:		7–36			
