= Bradlee Anae =

American football player (born 1998)

No. 96 – BC Lions
- Position: Linebacker/Defensive lineman
- Roster status: Suspended
- CFL status: American

Personal information
- Born: October 17, 1998 (age 28); Laie, Hawaii, U.S.
- Listed height: 6 ft 3 in (1.91 m)
- Listed weight: 255 lb (116 kg)

Career information
- High school: Kahuku (Laie)
- College: Utah (2016–2019)
- NFL draft: 2020: 5th round, 179th overall pick

Career history
- Dallas Cowboys (2020–2021); New York Jets (2022–2023); Atlanta Falcons (2024)*; New York Jets (2024)*; Birmingham Stallions (2025); San Francisco 49ers (2025)*; BC Lions (2025–present)
- * Offseason or practice squad member only

Awards and highlights
- Morris Trophy (2019); Consensus All-American (2019); 2× First-team All-Pac-12 (2018, 2019)

Career NFL statistics
- Total tackles: 2
- Stats at Pro Football Reference

Bradlee Joseph Ioane Anae (/əˈnaɪ/ ə-NY; born October 17, 1998) is an American professional football linebacker/defensive lineman for the BC Lions of the Canadian Football League (CFL). He played college football for the Utah Utes.

== Early life ==
Anae grew up in Laie, Hawaii and attended Kahuku High & Intermediate School, where he was a member of the basketball, football, and track teams. As a senior, he contributed to the school earning a 13-0 record and winning the Division 1 state title. He received All-state and second-team All-USA Hawaii honors. He is of Samoan descent.

Rated a three-star recruit, Anae committed to play college football at the University of Utah over offers from Vanderbilt and BYU. He followed his older sister Adora, who was a volleyball scholar athlete at the school.

== College career ==
Anae played in six games for Utah as a true freshman defensive end backup, recording four tackles and two sacks. He started 9 games at right defensive end and one at defensive tackle for the Utes during his sophomore year, registering 39 total tackles, 3 forced fumbles, with a team-leading 7.0 sacks and tying for the team lead with 10.0 tackles for loss.

As a junior, he started all 14 games (the last 11 at right defensive end). He led the Pac-12 Conference with 8.0 sacks and finished third in the conference with 15.5 tackles for loss along with 51 total tackles (fifth on the team), three passes broken up, 2 forced fumbles and was named first-team All-Pac-12. He considered entering the 2019 NFL draft, but ultimately decided to return for his senior season.

As a senior, he started all 14 games at left defensive end and was part of a stout defensive unit that saw 6 players selected in the 2020 NFL draft. Anae was named preseason first-team All-Pac-12 and to the Bednarik Award watch list going into his senior year. He tied the Utah career sack record with 29.5 after posting 1.5 sacks against Colorado on November 30, 2019. Anae broke the career sack record in the 2019 Alamo Bowl, the final game of his career, with a half sack against the University of Texas. Anae finished his senior season with 14 starts, 41 tackles, 13.0 sacks, 14.0 tackles for loss and a forced fumble, while being named first-team All-Pac-12, consensus All-American selection, received the Morris Trophy as the best defensive lineman in the Pac-12 and was a finalist for the Ted Hendricks Award. He also participated in the 2020 Senior Bowl, where he had 3 sacks and received defensive MVP honors.

He finished his college career with 38 starts out of 47 games, 30 sacks (school record), 210 sack yards (school record), 41.5 tackles for loss (fourth in school history), 245 tackle for loss yards (school record) and 6 forced fumbles (tied for eighth in school history).

=== College statistics ===
			Defense				
Year	Team	GP	Tackles	For Loss	Sacks	FF	PD
2016	Utah	3	4	2.0	2.0	0	0
2017	Utah	12	39	10.0	7.0	3	0
2018	Utah	12	47	14.0	7.5	1	3
2019	Utah	12	41	14.0	13.0	1	0
Total		39	131	40.0	29.5	5	3

== Professional career ==
Pre-draft measurables
Height	Weight	Arm length	Hand span	Wingspan	40-yard dash	10-yard split	20-yard split	20-yard shuttle	Three-cone drill	Vertical jump	Broad jump	Bench press
6 ft 3 3/8 in (1.91 m)	257 lb (117 kg)	32 1/8 in (0.82 m)	10 1/8 in (0.26 m)	6 ft 6 1/8 in (1.98 m)	4.93 s	1.68 s	2.83 s	4.43 s	7.44 s	31.0 in (0.79 m)	9 ft 7 in (2.92 m)	25 reps
All values from NFL Combine

=== Dallas Cowboys ===
Anae was selected by the Dallas Cowboys in the fifth round with the 179th overall pick in the 2020 NFL draft, after dropping because he didn't test well at the NFL Scouting Combine. As a rookie, he appeared in the first six games with minimum playing opportunities. After defensive end Randy Gregory returned from his suspension, Anae was declared inactive in nine of the last 10 contests. It was later reported in the media, that the team's defensive end depth and his struggles against the run were the reasons for his lack of playing time. He played mainly on special teams and had one defensive tackle.

On September 24, 2021, he was placed on the reserve/COVID-19 list. On October 6, he was activated from the reserve/COVID-19 list. On November 2, Anae was waived after committing a defensive offsides penalty on fourth-and-5 in the second quarter against the Minnesota Vikings, that kept a drive alive. On November 4, he was re-signed to the practice squad. He appeared in 4 games as a backup defensive end, making 2 defensive tackles.

=== New York Jets (first stint) ===
On January 19, 2022, Anae signed a reserve/future contract with the New York Jets. He was waived on August 30, and re-signed to the practice squad the next day. On January 7, 2023, he was promoted to the active roster to provide depth for the season finale against the Miami Dolphins.

In 2023, he returned to the team to compete for a roster position. He was placed on injured reserve on May 25, 2023. He became an unrestricted free agent and was not re-signed at the end of the season.

=== Atlanta Falcons ===
On May 13, 2024, Anae signed with the Atlanta Falcons. He was waived on August 25.

=== Birmingham Stallions (first stint) ===
On November 18, 2024, Anae signed with the Birmingham Stallions of the United Football League (UFL).

=== New York Jets (second stint) ===
On December 18, 2024, the New York Jets signed Anae to their practice squad. The Jets did not sign Anae to a reserve/future contract at the end of the 2024 NFL season, leaving him as a free agent.

=== Birmingham Stallions (second stint) ===
On January 16, 2025, Anae was re-signed by the Stallions.

=== San Francisco 49ers ===
On August 4, 2025, Anae signed with the San Francisco 49ers. He was placed on injured reserve on August 13, and was released shortly after.

=== BC Lions ===
On September 9, 2025, Anae signed as a defensive lineman with the BC Lions of the Canadian Football League (CFL). On September 18, 2025, Anae was placed on the Lions' 1-game injured list. He rejoined the active roster on September 25, 2025. On May 10, 2026, Anae was suspended by the Lions after he failed to report to the team's training camp, prior to the start of the 2026 CFL season. Anae had previously informed the Lions that he did not wish to return for another season, however his CFL rights will still be retained by the team. Anae remained suspended for the entire 2026 CFL season.

== Personal life ==
Anae's father, Brad Anae, played college football at BYU and was an honorable mention All-American in 1980 and a third-team All-America selection in 1981 and played three seasons in the United States Football League. His two uncles, Matt and Robert Anae, also played at BYU and Robert is currently the offensive coordinator at NC State University.
