= Antonio Gibson (safety) =

American football player (born 1962)

No. 27, 44
- Position: Safety

Personal information
- Born: July 23, 1962 (age 64); Jackson, Mississippi, U.S.
- Listed height: 6 ft 3 in (1.91 m)
- Listed weight: 206 lb (93 kg)

Career information
- High school: Murrah (Jackson)
- College: Cincinnati

Career history
- Philadelphia / Baltimore Stars (1983–1985); New Orleans Saints (1986–1989); Dallas Cowboys (1990)*; Birmingham Fire (1992); New Orleans Saints (1992)
- * Offseason or practice squad member only

Awards and highlights
- 2× first-team All-Metro (1981, 1982); 1984 USFL Championship Philadelphia Stars; 1985 USFL Championship Baltimore Stars; USFL's All-Time Team (1983–1985); Football Digest NFL All-Rookie team (1986)

Career statistics
- Games played - started: 58 - 36
- Sacks: 5
- Interceptions: 3
- Stats at Pro Football Reference

Antonio Maurice Gibson (born July 5, 1962) is an American former professional football player who was a safety for the New Orleans Saints and the Dallas Cowboys of the National Football League (NFL). He also was a member of the Philadelphia Stars of the United States Football League (USFL). He played college football for the Cincinnati Bearcats.

== Early life ==
Gibson attended Murrah High School, where he practiced football and track. He enrolled at Hinds Junior College in Jackson, Mississippi.

After his sophomore season, he transferred to the University of Cincinnati. He led the team in tackles during the 1981 and 1982 seasons. He was named a team captain as a senior. He finished his career with 270 tackles and 7 interceptions. He also was a two-time AP Honorable-Mention All-American, All-Metro conference selection, and UC Bearcat Outstanding Defensive Player of the Year.

== Professional career ==
=== Philadelphia Stars (USFL) ===
Gibson was selected by the Philadelphia Stars in the fourth round (41st overall) of the 1983 USFL draft. He played 3 years until the league folded after the 1985 season and participated in all three USFL Championship games, winning one championship with the Philadelphia Stars and one with the Baltimore Stars.

=== New Orleans Saints (first stint) ===
==== 1986 season ====
During the 1986 season, he signed as a free agent with the New Orleans Saints. He was named the starting strong safety in the fourth week of the season. He posted 75 tackles, 2 interceptions, and was named to Football Digest's All-Rookie team.

==== 1987 season ====
During the 1987 season, he posted 44 tackles and one interception in 10 starts. He suffered a broken arm in the tenth game against the New York Giants, and was placed on the injured reserve list.

==== 1988 season ====
During the 1988 season, he registered 31 tackles, as well as a blocked field goal, during the 10 games that he played after dealing with a foot injury.

==== 1989 season ====
During the 1989 season, he mostly served as a backup to Gene Atkins. He started 3 games during this season. He was a part of a defense that set eight franchise records, including fewest yards allowed and most fumbles recovered in a single-season.

=== Dallas Cowboys ===
In 1990, the Dallas Cowboys signed Gibson as a Plan B free agent. He was released before the start of the season on August 16.

=== Birmingham Fire (WLAF) ===
Gibson played for the Birmingham Fire of the World League of American Football during the 1992 WLAF season.

=== New Orleans Saints (second stint) ===
On July 27, 1992, he signed with the New Orleans Saints as a free agent. He was released before the start of the season. On November 19, he was re-signed to replace the injured Brett Maxie. He served as a backup at safety and appeared in 6 games. At the end of the season, the Saints didn't re-sign him to a contract, which made him a free agent.
