= Irv Eatman =

American football player and coach (born 1961)

No. 75
- Position: Offensive tackle

Personal information
- Born: January 1, 1961 (age 65); Birmingham, Alabama, U.S.
- Listed height: 6 ft 7 in (2.01 m)
- Listed weight: 293 lb (133 kg)

Career information
- High school: Meadowdale (Dayton, Ohio)
- College: UCLA
- NFL draft: 1983: 8th round, 204th overall pick

Career history

Playing
- Philadelphia Stars (1983-1984); Baltimore Stars (1985); Kansas City Chiefs (1986–1990); New York Jets (1991–1992); Los Angeles Rams (1993); Atlanta Falcons (1994); Houston Oilers (1995–1996)

Coaching
- Green Bay Packers (1999) Assistant offensive line coach; Pittsburgh Steelers (2000) Assistant offensive line coach; Kansas City Chiefs (2001–2005) Assistant offensive line coach; Oakland Raiders (2006) Co-offensive line coach

Awards and highlights
- USFL All-Time Team; 3× All-USFL (1983, 1984, 1985); First-team All-Pac-10 (1980); Second-team All-Pac-10 (1981)

Career NFL statistics
- Games played: 149
- Games started: 118
- Fumble recoveries: 5
- Stats at Pro Football Reference

Irvin Humphrey Eatman (born January 1, 1961) is an American former professional football offensive tackle and coach who played professionally for 3 seasons in the United States Football League (USFL) and 11 seasons with the National Football League (NFL).

== Playing career ==
=== High school ===
Eatman attended Meadowdale High School in Dayton, Ohio where he starred in football and basketball.

=== College ===
A native of Birmingham, Alabama, Eatman attended UCLA where he was a two-time Lombardi Award semi-finalist, three-time honorable mention All-America and two-time All-Pac-10 selection. He played on the Bruins Rose Bowl Champion squad as a senior following the 1982 season.

=== USFL ===
Eatman was selected 204th overall in the eighth round of the 1983 NFL draft by the Kansas City Chiefs. However, he opted to join the USFL where he was a three-time USFL All-Pro offensive tackle (1983–1985) with the Philadelphia/Baltimore Stars. In 1984, Eatman was named USFL Man of the Year and was part of Stars squads which claimed USFL titles in both 1984 and 1985.

=== NFL ===
Eatman had a five-year stint in Kansas City (1986–1990) before playing six seasons with the New York Jets (1991–1992), the Los Angeles Rams (1993), the Atlanta Falcons (1994) and the Houston Oilers (1995–1996).
