= Scott Fitzkee =

American football player (born 1957)

No. 81
- Position: Wide receiver

Personal information
- Born: April 8, 1957 (age 69); York, Pennsylvania, U.S.
- Listed height: 6 ft 0 in (1.83 m)
- Listed weight: 187 lb (85 kg)

Career information
- High school: Red Lion (Red Lion, Pennsylvania)
- College: Penn State
- NFL draft: 1979: 5th round, 126th overall pick

Career history
- Philadelphia Eagles (1979–1980); San Diego Chargers (1981–1982); Philadelphia / Baltimore Stars (1983–1985); Montreal Alouettes (1986)

Awards and highlights
- First-team All-East (1978)

Career NFL statistics
- Receptions: 17
- Receiving yards: 321
- Receiving touchdowns: 4
- Stats at Pro Football Reference

Scott Austin Fitzkee (born April 8, 1957) is an American former professional football player who was a wide receiver in the National Football League (NFL) and United States Football League (USFL). He played college football for the Penn State Nittany Lions. In the NFL, Fitzkee played for the Philadelphia Eagles and San Diego Chargers, and in the USFL, he played for the Philadelphia / Baltimore Stars. He also played for the Montreal Alouettes of the Canadian Football League (CFL).

Fitzkee attended Red Lion High School in Red Lion, Pennsylvania, where his father was the principal. Fitzkee was the captain of their football, basketball, and baseball teams, and he also won the state 100-yard dash championship. He then played at Penn State University, who converted him from running back to wide receiver.

Fitzkee was selected by the Philadelphia Eagles in the fifth round of the 1979 NFL draft. As a rookie in 1979, he was the Eagles' third wide receiver, playing on special teams and seeing part-time action when the team used three-receiver sets. The team won 11 games for the first time since 1949. In 1980, Fitzkee caught a touchdown in both of the first two games of the season. However, he suffered a broken bone in week 4 against St. Louis, and broke it again in the playoffs versus Minnesota. The Eagles placed him on injured reserve to start the 1981 season. After Rodney Parker twisted his knee mid-season, Philadelphia tried to activate Fitzkee, but NFL rules required that he clear waivers first to be eligible to play for the Eagles that season. Instead, he was claimed by the San Diego Chargers on November 20, 1981, and played in five games but not a single down on offense.

With the Chargers in 1982, Fitzkee was used little as a third receiver, catching only three passes. He thought that he had a good training camp and believed he outplayed Dwight Scales, who ended up with more playing time. Fitzkee decided to join the Philadelphia Stars of the new USFL in 1983. He signed with the Montreal Alouettes of the CFL in 1986.

USFL statistics
Year	Team	Receiving				
Year	Team	Rec	Yds	Avg	Lng	TD
1983	Philadelphia/Baltimore Stars	55	731	13.3	44	3
1984	Philadelphia/Baltimore Stars	55	895	16.3	45	9
1985	Philadelphia/Baltimore Stars	73	882	12.1	37	3
Career		183	2508	13.7	45	15
