= Sean Landeta =

American football player (born 1962)

No. 5, 7
- Position: Punter

Personal information
- Born: January 6, 1962 (age 64); Baltimore, Maryland, U.S.
- Listed height: 6 ft 0 in (1.83 m)
- Listed weight: 215 lb (98 kg)

Career information
- High school: Loch Raven (Towson, Maryland)
- College: Towson (1979–1982)
- NFL draft: 1983: undrafted

Career history
- Philadelphia / Baltimore Stars (1983–1985); New York Giants (1985–1993); Los Angeles / St. Louis Rams (1993–1996); Tampa Bay Buccaneers (1997); Green Bay Packers (1998); Philadelphia Eagles (1999–2002); St. Louis Rams (2003–2004); Philadelphia Eagles (2005); New York Giants (2006)

Awards and highlights
- 2× Super Bowl champion (XXI, XXV); 2× USFL champion (1984, 1985); 3x First-team All-Pro (1986, 1989, 1990); 2x Pro Bowl (1986, 1990); NFL 1980s All-Decade Team; NFL 1990s All-Decade Team; New York Giants 100th Anniversary Team; Philadelphia Eagles 75th Anniversary Team; St. Louis Rams 10th Anniversary Team; USFL All-Time Team

Career NFL statistics
- Punts: 1,401
- Punting yards: 60,707
- Punting average: 43.3
- Stats at Pro Football Reference

Sean Edward Landeta (born January 6, 1962) is an American former professional football player who was a punter in both the United States Football League (USFL) and the National Football League (NFL). He played college football for the Towson Tigers. Landeta played 22 seasons in the NFL for five different teams between 1985 and 2006. He was named to the NFL 1980s All-Decade Team as the first punter and the 1990s All-Decade Team as the second punter, as chosen by the Hall of Fame Selection Committee members. He is one of 29 individuals out of 25,000 players in NFL history to be selected to multiple All-Decade teams.

== Early life ==
Landeta grew up in Baltimore, Maryland. He never played organized football until his senior year at Loch Raven High School in Towson, Maryland. Landeta was an All-City and All-Metro punter in his only season (1978). Landeta kicked a 41-yard field goal on his first attempt in his first game. His longest punt was 76 yards, which still stands as a school record.

== College career ==
Before his pro career, he played college football at Towson University in 1979, 1980, 1981 and 1982. He started as a freshman for Towson at the age of 17. He led the nation in punting (NCAA Division II) in 1980 and was named First-Team All American in 1982 (NCAA Division II). Landeta booted a school record 72-yard punt in 1981 and hit the school record 57-yard field goal in 1980. He became the only player in NCAA history to lead the nation in punting and field goals in the same season (1980).

== Professional career ==
He played almost half of his career for the New York Giants, where he won two championship rings in Super Bowl XXI and Super Bowl XXV. He also played for the Rams, Buccaneers, Packers and Eagles. Landeta led the NFL in punts with 107 in 1999, led the NFL in gross punting in 1994 with a 44.8 average, led the NFL with a 37.8 net average in 1989, and led the league with 24 punts inside the 20 in 1990.

Landeta was the last active NFL player who played in the United States Football League in the 1980s, punting for the Philadelphia/Baltimore Stars in all three of the original USFL's seasons. Landeta was named as the punter to the All-USFL team in 1983 and 1984. The Stars won back-to-back USFL championships in 1984 and 1985.

Upon the USFL's folding, Landeta joined the NFL's New York Giants, winning two Super Bowls in 1986 and 1990 in his nine seasons with the team (he would return in 2006, in what would be his last season as an active player). He then played for the Los Angeles/St. Louis Rams from 1993 to 1996. He re-joined the Rams for the 2003 and 2004 seasons, giving him six years with the organization. After spending one season (1997) with the Tampa Bay Buccaneers, he moved on to play for the Green Bay Packers in 1998. In 1999, he signed as a free agent with the Philadelphia Eagles. He spent five seasons with the Eagles where he became the oldest punter in NFL history at the age of 44.

Other career highlights include being the first punter in NFL history to average more than 50-yards per punt in a game in three different decades. In 1994, Landeta led the NFL in punting with a 44.8-yard average playing for the Los Angeles Rams. He also recorded the longest punt in Tampa Bay Buccaneers history, with a 74-yarder in 1997 in a game against the New York Jets. As a member of the Green Bay Packers, he set a club record for the highest net punting average and most punts inside the 20 in team history (since the AFL/NFL merger in 1970). As a member of the Eagles, Landeta set the NFL all-time record for number of punts, punting yardage and punts inside the 20 during the 2001 season.

Landeta was the longest-tenured punter in NFL history and is still the oldest punter to ever appear in an NFL game. In addition, Landeta became the first punter in NFL history to earn a $1 million annual salary. Landeta was also named to ESPN's list of 50 All-Time Greatest New York Giants players.

On March 6, 2008, the 25th anniversary of Landeta's first game in the USFL, he officially announced his retirement from professional football.

== Post-playing career ==
In September 2005, Landeta was elected to the Towson University Hall of Fame.

In November 2006, Landeta was elected to the NCAA Division II College Football Hall of Fame.

In May 2009, Landeta was elected to the Pennsylvania Sports Hall of Fame in Philadelphia.

In September 2011, Landeta was elected to the inaugural Loch Raven High School Hall of Fame Class.

In November 2011, Landeta was elected to the State of Maryland Sports Hall of Fame.

In 2010, Landeta became eligible for the Pro Football Hall of Fame and appeared on the ballot for the first time.

After his retirement from the NFL, Landeta has worked with the Eagles and Giants organizations as an alumnus of both teams. He has worked in the media for CBS Radio, FOX Television, ComCast Network and Westwood One. In addition, Landeta has spoken and appeared on numerous radio and television shows around the country. Landeta has also been involved with many charities throughout his NFL career.

== NFL career statistics ==
Legend
	Won the Super Bowl
	Led the league
**Bold**	Career high

Regular season

Season	Team	GP	Punting					
Season	Team	GP	Punts	Yards	Y/P	Net	In20	TB
1985	NYG	16	81	3,472	42.9	36.4	20	**14**
1986	NYG	16	79	3,539	**44.8**	37.1	24	11
1987	NYG	12	65	2,773	42.7	31.0	12	6
1988	NYG	1	6	222	37.0	35.8	1	0
1989	NYG	16	70	3,019	43.1	**37.8**	19	7
1990	NYG	16	75	3,306	44.1	37.3	24	11
1991	NYG	15	64	2,768	43.3	35.3	16	8
1992	NYG	11	53	2,317	43.7	31.5	18	10
1993	NYG	8	33	1,390	42.1	35.0	11	3
1993	LARams	8	42	1,825	43.5	32.9	7	7
1994	LARams	16	78	3,494	**44.8**	34.3	23	9
1995	STL	16	83	3,679	44.3	36.7	23	12
1996	STL	16	78	3,491	**44.8**	36.1	23	9
1997	TB	10	54	2,274	42.1	34.1	15	6
1998	GB	16	65	2,788	42.9	37.1	**30**	7
1999	PHI	16	**107**	**4,524**	42.3	35.1	21	12
2000	PHI	16	86	3,635	42.3	36.0	23	8
2001	PHI	16	97	4,221	43.5	36.4	26	10
2002	PHI	12	52	2,229	42.9	34.6	19	7
2003	STL	16	59	2,525	42.8	32.9	14	5
2004	STL	10	40	1,733	43.3	32.5	9	3
2005	PHI	5	34	1,483	43.6	38.2	7	2
Career		284	1,401	60,707	43.3	35.3	380	166

== See also ==
- History of the New York Giants (1979–1993)
