= Philadelphia / Baltimore Stars =

Defunct football team in the USFL

General information
- Founded: 1982
- Folded: 1986
- Headquartered: Byrd Stadium in College Park, Maryland
- Colors: Crimson, Old Gold, White

Personnel
- Owner: Myles Tanenbaum
- Head coach: 1983 Jim Mora 48–13–1 (.782)

Team history
- Philadelphia Stars (1983–1984); Baltimore Stars (1985)

Home fields
- Veterans Stadium (1983–1984); Franklin Field (1984 postseason); Byrd Stadium (1985)

League / conference affiliations
- United States Football League (1983–1985): Eastern Conference (1984–1985); Atlantic Division (1983–1984)

Championships
- League championships: 2; 1984, 1985
- Conference championships: 2; 1984, 1985
- Division championships: 2; 1983, 1984

Playoff appearances (3)
- 1983, 1984, 1985

The Philadelphia / Baltimore Stars were a professional American football team which played in the United States Football League (USFL) in the mid-1980s. Owned by real-estate magnate Myles Tanenbaum, they were the short-lived league's dominant team, playing in all three championship games and winning the latter two. They played their first two seasons in Philadelphia as the Philadelphia Stars before relocating to Baltimore, where they played as the Baltimore Stars for the USFL's final season. Coached by Jim Mora, the Stars won a league-best 41 regular season games and 7 playoff games.

== Founding ==
On May 11, 1982, the announcement of the USFL was officially made by league owner and antique dealer, David Dixon. The league's Philadelphia team would be owned by real estate developer Myles H. Tanenbaum. He had originally wanted to name the team the Stallions in honor of Rocky Balboa, who was nicknamed "The Italian Stallion." However, when the Birmingham entry snapped up the Stallions name, Tanenbaum settled on "Stars."

George Perles was originally named as the team's head coach in July 1982. Perles, previously an assistant coach for the NFL's Pittsburgh Steelers, never coached a game for the Stars, opting to take the head coach position for Michigan State instead. On January 15, 1983, the Stars hired Jim Mora to be their head coach.

== 1983 season ==
The Stars began in Philadelphia in the USFL's inaugural 1983 season and played their home games at Veterans Stadium (the "Vet"). They compiled the league's best regular season record of 15–3 (.833), and advanced to the 1983 USFL championship game. Their "Doghouse Defense" allowed only 204 points in an 18-game season—the least in the history of the league. The Stars were led by fourth-year quarterback Chuck Fusina (1978 Heisman Trophy runner-up), fifth-year wide receiver Scott Fitzkee, rookie halfback Kelvin Bryant of North Carolina, rookie offensive tackle Irv Eatman of UCLA, rookie linebacker Sam Mills, and second-year safety Scott Woerner. The team also featured Towson's all-star rookie punter Sean Landeta. At the conclusion of the regular season, Bryant was named the USFL's Player of the Year by the Associated Press.

The Stars entered the playoffs as the top-seeded team. In the Semi-Finals, the Stars defeated the preseason favorites to win the 1983 title—George Allen's Chicago Blitz—by withstanding seven turnovers and erasing a 21-point deficit in the fourth quarter to win 44–38 in overtime. In the league title game at Denver's Mile High Stadium on July 17, the Stars lost to Jim Stanley's Michigan Panthers, 24–22. Just as they had against the Blitz, the Stars opened the game sluggishly, but finished with a flourish, after allowing the Panthers to carry a 17–3 lead into the fourth quarter. Many observers of the time believed that the Stars, Panthers and Blitz were almost NFL-quality units.

One of the few blemishes on the Stars' first season was the box office. They only attracted 18,650 fans per game. In addition to bad weather, there were lingering memories of a massive gate-papering scandal involving the World Football League's Philadelphia Bell in 1974. The Bell had claimed that a total of over 120,000 fans had attended their first two games, but it subsequently emerged that all but 19,000 of the tickets had been given away for free or for significantly reduced prices.

== 1984 season ==
The Stars remained in Philadelphia for the 1984 season but were forced to relocate their post-season home games to Franklin Field due to a conflict with the Philadelphia Phillies. The Stars roared through the regular season with the league best 16–2 (.889) record, and routed George Allen's Arizona Wranglers, 23–3 for the league title in Florida at Tampa Stadium on July 15. It was the last traditional professional football championship for the city of Philadelphia until the Eagles' Super Bowl LII victory at the end of the 2017 season, and its first since the 1960 NFL championship. The Stars were also becoming increasingly popular among fans, as average home attendance jumped from approximately 18,000 in 1983 to 28,000 in 1984.

After the league championship game, the Stars played a rare post-season exhibition game with Tampa Bay in England on July 21, and defeated the Bandits 24–21 at Wembley Stadium in London.

=== Schedule ===
Week	Date	Opponent	Result	Record	Venue	Attendance
Preseason
1	Bye					
2	Bye					
3	February 11	vs. New Jersey Generals	L 20–28	0–1	Deland, Florida	
4	February 18	vs. Tampa Bay Bandits	L 17–22	0–2	Orlando, Florida	
Regular season
1	February 26	at Memphis Showboats	W 17–9	1–0	Liberty Bowl Memorial Stadium	28,098
2	March 4	at Washington Federals	W 17–6	2–0	RFK Stadium	12,067
3	March 11	at New Jersey Generals	L 14–17	2–1	Giants Stadium	46,716
4	March 18	Oakland Invaders	W 28–7	3–1	Veterans Stadium	30,284
5	March 24	at Pittsburgh Maulers	W 25–10	4–1	Three Rivers Stadium	24,341
6	April 1	Tampa Bay Bandits	W 38–24	5–1	Veterans Stadium	30,270
7	April 8	at Arizona Wranglers	W 22–21	6–1	Sun Devil Stadium	30,252
8	April 15	Chicago Blitz	W 41–7	7–1	Veterans Stadium	17,417
9	April 22	at San Antonio Gunslingers	W 24–10	8–1	Alamo Stadium	16,590
10	April 27	New Orleans Breakers	W 35–0	9–1	Veterans Stadium	34,011
11	May 6	at Birmingham Stallions	W 43–11	10–1	Legion Field	49,500
12	May 13	Los Angeles Express	W 18–14	11–1	Veterans Stadium	22,391
13	May 19	Jacksonville Bulls	W 45–12	12–1	Veterans Stadium	33,194
14	May 27	at Michigan Panthers	W 31–13	13–1	Pontiac Silverdome	20,387
15	June 4	Pittsburgh Maulers	W 23–17	14–1	Veterans Stadium	30,102
16	June 8	at Denver Gold	W 21–19	15–1	Mile High Stadium	30,755
17	June 15	Washington Federals	W 31–8	16–1	Veterans Stadium	22,582
18	June 24	New Jersey Generals	L 10–16	16–2	Veterans Stadium	37,758
Playoffs
Divisional Playoff	June 30	New Jersey Generals	W 28–7	1–0	Franklin Field	19,038
Conference Championship	July 8	Birmingham Stallions	W 20–10	2–0	Franklin Field	26,616
USFL Championship	July 15	vs. Arizona Wranglers	W 23–3	3–0	Tampa Stadium	52,662
Postseason Exhibition
Exhibition	July 21	vs. Tampa Bay Bandits	W 24–21	—	Wembley Stadium, London, England	21,000

== Relocation to Baltimore ==
The league's owners, led by Donald Trump of the New Jersey Generals, voted to move play to the fall following the 1985 season. This put the Stars in a difficult position. Tanenbaum said that the Stars would have had to start the 1986 season on an extended road trip due to the Phillies sharing Veterans Stadium as well. Had the Phillies advanced to the World Series, the Stars would not be able to play a home game until November at the earliest. Moving full-time to Franklin Field was quickly ruled out due to the Penn Quakers football team playing there on Saturdays when the USFL had planned to play in the fall. The only other football venue in Philadelphia was John F. Kennedy Stadium, next door to the Vet. However, the 60-year-old stadium was in a poor state of repair after not being well maintained in several years; it would be condemned only four years later. In any case, it seated over 100,000 people, meaning even a decent-sized USFL crowd would have been swallowed up in the environment.

At the time, the Philadelphia Eagles were in visible distress only five years after making it to the Super Bowl due to Eagles owner Leonard Tose's gambling and other debts. The Stars were one of the few USFL teams that had a realistic possibility of forcing their NFL counterparts out of town. At one point, Tose unsuccessfully tried to trade the Eagles for the equally distressed Buffalo Bills and/or relocate to Arizona. However, officials with the city of Philadelphia had shown clear favoritism to the Eagles despite their financial struggles, scuttling Tose's efforts and securing an agreement to keep the Eagles in Philadelphia.

With no venue in the Philadelphia metropolitan area suitable even for temporary use, Tanenbaum moved the team to Baltimore, which was still smarting from the loss of the NFL Colts in March 1984. Indeed, even as Tanenbaum prepared to move the Stars, the city of Baltimore was attempting to strip the Colts from owner Robert Irsay via eminent domain.

It initially appeared that the Stars would be bolstered by a merger with the Pittsburgh Maulers. Owner Edward J. DeBartolo, Sr. had folded the Maulers after just one season because he knew he could not compete with the Pittsburgh Steelers, nor did he want to compete directly against his son, Edward J. DeBartolo, Jr., who owned the San Francisco 49ers. He agreed to join Tanenbaum as a minority partner, but decided to get out altogether soon afterward.

Baltimore welcomed the Stars with open arms. Tanenbaum quickly signed a broadcasting deal with Baltimore's most powerful radio station, WBAL, and built a good relationship with then-mayor William Donald Schaefer. However, Tanenbaum ran into a problem when he discovered that the Stars could not play at Baltimore's Memorial Stadium until 1986 due to objections from the Baltimore Orioles. Reportedly, Orioles general manager Hank Peters and manager Joe Altobelli were concerned about the Stars tearing up the turf, and persuaded owner Edward Bennett Williams to lock out the Stars. With no other stadium in the immediate Baltimore area suitable for temporary use, Tanenbaum was forced to play at the University of Maryland's Byrd Stadium in College Park, 29 miles (47 km) southwest of Baltimore and a Washington suburb (coincidentally, the Washington USFL franchise, the Federals, moved to Orlando as the Orlando Renegades the same season). This was all compounded by the Washington Redskins' success during these years which included playing in the Super Bowl in January 1983 and 1984. Further complicating matters, the team kept its operations in Philadelphia and commuted to College Park for games—effectively consigning the Stars to 18 road games for the league's lame-duck spring season.

== 1985 season ==
At least in part due to all the moving, the Stars initially struggled in 1985, but won nine of their last 13 games to secure a wild-card berth. They did so in front of a mostly empty Byrd Stadium, however. While Baltimore-area fans were happy to see the return of pro football after a two-year absence, they balked at making the 35-minute drive down Interstate 95 to see the Stars play in College Park. Most were waiting for the team to begin play in the city's venerable Memorial Stadium a year later.

As a result, attendance sagged to the point that the Stars might have lost home-field advantage for the playoffs even with a winning record. ABC Sports, embarrassed at the dwindling attendance from around the league, told Usher it did not want to televise playoff games in near-empty stadiums. Since ABC had disproportionate influence on league affairs due to the structure of its contract with the USFL, Usher had little choice but to agree. However, the Stars managed to upend the favored New Jersey Generals and Birmingham Stallions in successive weeks to reach the title game at Giants Stadium in New Jersey. Once there, the Stars won the USFL title beating the Bobby Hebert-led Oakland Invaders, 28–24. Soon afterward, Tanenbaum sold controlling interest to fellow real estate magnate Stephen Ross.

As it turned out, this was the final USFL game ever played. On July 29, 1986, a federal grand jury found in favor of the USFL in its antitrust suit against the NFL. However, the USFL was only awarded $1 in damages, tripled to $3 under antitrust law. The league's abandonment of Philadelphia was a factor in the adverse jury award. The jury foreman explained that while they agreed the NFL was a monopoly, they could not agree on the size of the award. As a result, the jury misinterpreted the law and decided on the $1 award, feeling it would be changed by the presiding judge. However, the judge was not able to increase the amount once it was stipulated by the jury. As a result, the league suspended operations a day later, never to return.

Number 19 was never issued to any player in that lone season out of respect to the Colts' great Johnny Unitas.

=== Schedule ===
Week	Date	Opponent	Result	Record	Venue	Attendance
Preseason
1	February 2	vs. Orlando Renegades	L 10–16	0–1	Spec Martin Stadium, Deland, Florida	300
2	February 9	vs. Memphis Showboats	W 14–9	1–1	Winter Haven, Florida	
3	February 16	vs. Tampa Bay Bandits	L 26–28	1–2	Charlotte, North Carolina	20,000
Regular season
1	February 24	at Jacksonville Bulls	L 14–22	0–1	Gator Bowl Stadium	51,045
2	March 3	at Oakland Invaders	T 17–17 (OT)	0–1–1	Oakland–Alameda County Coliseum	20,495
3	March 9	at Memphis Showboats	L 19–21	0–2–1	Liberty Bowl Memorial Stadium	37,466
4	March 17	New Jersey Generals	W 29–9	1–2–1	Byrd Stadium	31,026
5	March 24	Birmingham Stallions	L 3–7	1–3–1	Byrd Stadium	14,529
6	March 31	at Houston Gamblers	W 27–14	2–3–1	Houston Astrodome	24,166
7	April 7	at Los Angeles Express	W 17–6	3–3–1	Los Angeles Memorial Coliseum	5,637
8	April 14	Memphis Showboats	L 10–13	3–4–1	Byrd Stadium	15,728
9	April 21	Portland Breakers	W 26–17	4–4–1	Byrd Stadium	14,832
10	April 28	at Tampa Bay Bandits	L 14–29	4–5–1	Tampa Stadium	41,226
11	May 5	Arizona Outlaws	W 24–19	5–5–1	Byrd Stadium	14,432
12	May 12	at New Jersey Generals	L 3–10	5–6–1	Giants Stadium	34,446
13	May 17	at Orlando Renegades	W 34–21	6–6–1	Florida Citrus Bowl	23,121
14	May 26	San Antonio Gunslingers	W 28–10	7–6–1	Byrd Stadium	8,633
15	June 2	Jacksonville Bulls	W 17–12	8–6–1	Byrd Stadium	9,663
16	June 8	at Birmingham Stallions	L 7–14	8–7–1	Legion Field	24,300
17	June 15	Orlando Renegades	W 41–10	9–7–1	Byrd Stadium	6,988
18	June 23	Tampa Bay Bandits	W 38–10	10–7–1	Byrd Stadium	12,647
Postseason
Quarterfinals	July 1	at New Jersey Generals	W 20–17	1–0	Giants Stadium	26,982
Semifinals	July 7	at Birmingham Stallions	W 28–14	2–0	Legion Field	23,250
USFL Championship	July 14	vs. Oakland Invaders	W 28–24	3–0	Giants Stadium	49,263

== Legacy ==
The Stars are widely acknowledged to have been the best team to see the field in USFL history.

The Stars won 41 of 54 regular-season games and were 7–1 in the postseason. For the team's entire run, they were coached by Jim Mora (Sr), who later became a head coach in the NFL for the New Orleans Saints and Indianapolis Colts. Mora was actually the Stars' second choice; Tannenbaum originally hired Pittsburgh Steelers defensive coordinator George Perles, but Perles opted instead to take the open job at his alma mater, Michigan State.

Carl Peterson, who later became the president/general manager/chief executive officer of the Kansas City Chiefs, served as the team's General Manager for all three seasons.

Sean Landeta and Sam Mills both also had successful careers in the NFL. Landeta was one of the top punters in the NFL for two decades, and was the last former USFL player still active in the NFL at the time of his retirement in 2006. Mills had a sterling career with the Saints (alongside Mora) and the Carolina Panthers. The Panthers retired Mills' No. 51 jersey after his death from cancer in 2005.

Landeta and Bart Oates were also teammates with the New York Giants. Oates signed with the Giants in 1985. Both Oates and Landeta went on to win a combined five Super Bowl rings throughout their NFL careers. Both won two rings apiece with the Giants in 1986 and 1990, while Oates earned an additional ring with the San Francisco 49ers in 1994. Oates was selected to five Pro Bowls during his career and to the UPI All-NFC team three times. He was extremely durable, starting 125 consecutive games during his Giants career.

== Single-season leaders ==
Rushing Yards: 1470 (1983), Kelvin Bryant, 1406 (1984), Kelvin Bryant, 1207 (1985), Kelvin Bryant

Receiving Yards: 731 (1983), Scott Fitzkee, 1895 (1984), Scott Fitzkee, 882 (1985), Scott Fitzkee

Passing Yards: 2718 (1983), Chuck Fusina, 3837 (1984), Chuck Fusina, 3496 (1985), Chuck Fusina

Interceptions: 8 (1983), Scott Woerner, 7 (1984), Mike Lush, 10 (1985) Mike Lush

Sacks: 8.5 (1983), Don Fielder, 6 (1984) George Cooper, 10 (1985) John Walker

== Season-by-season results ==
Season records
Season	W	L	T	Finish	Playoff results
Philadelphia Stars
1983	15	3	0	1st Atlantic Division	Won Divisional Playoff (Chicago); Lost USFL Championship (Michigan)
1984	16	2	0	1st Atlantic Division	Won Divisional Playoff (New Jersey); Won Eastern Conference Championship (Birmingham); Won USFL Championship (Arizona)
Baltimore Stars
1985	10	7	1	4th Eastern Conference	Won Divisional Playoff (New Jersey); Won Eastern Conference Championship (Birmingham); Won USFL Championship (Oakland)
Totals	48	13	1	(including playoffs)	

== Radio broadcasters ==
Year	Station	Play-by-play	Color commentator
1983		Harry Donohue	
1984		Harry Donohue	Vince Papale
1985	WCBM	Chuck Thompson	Vince Bagli
