= Kimmel (surname) =

Kimmel is a German surname, a variant of Kümmel. Notable people with the surname include:

- Bobby Kimmel (born 1940), American musician
- Brianne Kimmel, American venture capitalist
- Bruce Kimmel (born 1947), American actor and director
- Daniel M. Kimmel (born 1955), American film critic and author
- Dick Kimmel (born 1947), American bluegrass musician
- Doc Kimmel (1926–2022), American politician from Florida
- Elizabeth Cody Kimmel (born 1964), American children's book writer
- Eric Kimmel (born 1946), American writer
- Frank Kimmel (born 1962), American racing driver
- Frankie Kimmel (born 1990), American stock car driver
- Haven Kimmel (born 1965), American author and poet
- Husband E. Kimmel (1882–1968), United States Navy admiral
- J. D. Kimmel (1929–2008), American football player
- Jamie Kimmel (born 1962), American football player
- Jimmy Kimmel (born 1967), American TV host and comedian
- John Kimmel (accordionist) (1866–1942), German-American musician
- John C. Kimmel (born 1954), American racehorse trainer
- Jon Kimmel (born 1960), American football player
- Jonathan Kimmel (born 1976), American writer, director and producer
- Kurt E. Kimmel (born 1941), Swiss banker and philatelist
- Manning M. Kimmel (1832–1916), American Union Army and Confederacy officer, father of Husband E. Kimmel
- Manning Kimmel (1913–1944), United States Navy submarine officer, son of Husband E. Kimmel
- Manny Kimmel (1896–1982), American businessman
- Martin Kimmel (1916–2008), American businessman and philanthropist
- Megan Kimmel (1980–2026), American runner
- Michael Kimmel (born 1951), American sociologist
- Richard Kimmel, American theatre director
- Robert Kimmel, American materials scientist and academic
- Robert Kimmel Smith (1930–2020), American children's writer
- Ron Kimmel (born 1963), Israeli computer scientist
- Sidney Kimmel (born 1928), American billionaire businessman
- Stanley Kimmel (1894–1982), American writer and composer
- Tom Kimmel (born 1953), American singer-songwriter
- Tõnis Kimmel (born 1977), Estonian architect
- Wayne Kimmel (born 1970), American investor
- Will Kimmel (born 1988), American racing driver
- William Kimmel (1812–1886), American politician

== See also ==
- Kimel
- Kimler
