= Dave Stalls =

American football player (born 1955)

No. 65, 61
- Position: Defensive end

Personal information
- Born: September 19, 1955 (age 71); Madison, Wisconsin, U.S.
- Listed height: 6 ft 5 in (1.96 m)
- Listed weight: 250 lb (113 kg)

Career information
- High school: Taft (Hamilton, Ohio)
- College: Northern Colorado
- NFL draft: 1977: 7th round, 191st overall pick

Career history
- Dallas Cowboys (1977–1979); Tampa Bay Buccaneers (1980–1983); Los Angeles Raiders (1983); Denver Gold (USFL) (1984); Los Angeles Raiders (1985)

Awards and highlights
- 2× Super Bowl champion (XII, XVIII); Third-team Little All-American (1975)

Career NFL statistics
- Sacks: 20.5
- Fumble recoveries: 4
- Stats at Pro Football Reference

David Milton Stalls (born September 19, 1955) is an American former professional football player who was a defensive end in the National Football League (NFL) for the Dallas Cowboys, Tampa Bay Buccaneers, and Los Angeles Raiders. He also was a member of the Denver Gold in the United States Football League (USFL). He played college football for the Northern Colorado Bears.

== Early life ==
Stalls attended Taft High School and did not start playing football until ninth grade, because he used to focus on ice hockey instead.

After not receiving much interest and writing letters to 40 prospective schools, he received a scholarship offer from the Division II University of Northern Colorado. He was a four-year starter at defensive tackle and received third-team Little All-American honors in 1975.

In 1997, he was inducted into the University of Northern Colorado Athletic Hall of Fame.

== Professional career ==
=== Dallas Cowboys ===
Stalls was selected in the seventh round (191st overall) of the 1977 NFL draft by the Dallas Cowboys. As a rookie, he was a core special teams player. In 1978, he was used mainly as a pass-rush specialist at left defensive tackle in place of Jethro Pugh or Larry Cole and emerged as a key reserve, registering 4 unofficial sacks (fourth on the team).

In 1979, he started the first 12 games at left defensive tackle (replacing the retired Jethro Pugh) ahead of former first-round draft choice Larry Bethea, until being replaced by Cole, after the Cowboys traded for John Dutton who would play left defensive end. He finished with 51 tackles and 5 unofficial sacks (tied for fourth on the team).

In 1980, Ed "Too Tall" Jones unretired and the Cowboys opened training camp with 8 quality defensive linemen, when they usually kept seven. The team decided to retain Bethea and Bruce Thornton instead, and on August 6, Stalls was traded to the Tampa Bay Buccaneers in exchange for a 1981 seventh round pick (#173-Ron Fellows) and a 1982 fourth round pick (#101-Brian Carpenter).

=== Tampa Bay Buccaneers ===
In 1980, the Tampa Bay Buccaneers traded for Stalls to replace an injured defensive end Wally Chambers. He appeared in 15 games with 3 starts.

In 1981, he was a backup end and defensive tackle used mostly on passing downs, until injuries to Lee Roy Selmon and Bill Kollar's season ending knee injury, forced him to start 9 games at left defensive end.

In the 1982 strike shortened season, he led the team in sacks (6.5) ahead of the future hall of famer Selmon. The next year, he had a contract holdout during training camp and asked for the Buccaneers to trade him to the Denver Broncos, in order to pursue his veterinarian interests in the offseason. Complicating matters was a tense relationship with head coach John McKay and the team's ownership, because of his NFL players' union activities.

Stalls ended up renegotiating his contract after the Broncos didn't accept giving up a fourth-round draft choice as part of the trade. He eventually reported to the team and had to pay $40,000 in fines for missing time. On October 18, he was waived after the Buccaneers were notified that he signed a future services contract with the Denver Gold of the United States Football League.

=== Los Angeles Raiders (first stint) ===
On November 10, 1983, needing help on the defensive line, the Los Angeles Raiders signed Stalls to a short-term contract after the Denver Gold agreed to loan him. Although he didn't have the size, he was used as a pass-rushing nose tackle where his quickness created mismatches en route to the Raiders winning Super Bowl XVIII.

=== Denver Gold ===
Stalls took two weeks off after the Super Bowl to physically recover from the grind of the NFL season and joined training camp in February. In 1984, he led the team in sacks with 12.5 (sixth in the league) but his production started to decline halfway through the season because of his body exhaustion. On May 18, he announced his retirement to concentrate in his next career.

=== Los Angeles Raiders (second stint) ===
After sitting out the previous year attending veterinary school at Colorado State University, he was signed by the Los Angeles Raiders as a free agent on July 21, 1985. The team used him again as a pass-rush specialist from the nose tackle position. He was released on October 3.

== Personal life ==
After football, he experienced many careers such as marine biology at California State University, veterinary medical studies at Colorado State University, investment banking at Boettcher & Company and Stern Brothers, sales at MCI Telecommunications, youth advocacy with the Center for the New West, senior management with the City of Denver's Recreation Department, founder & executive director of The Spot (gang youth center), executive director of Aspen Youth Experience, President/CEO of Big Brothers Big Sisters of Colorado, and currently the founder & executive director of the Street Fraternity in Denver, Colorado.
