= Feasel =

Feasel is a surname. Notable people with the surname include:

- Grant Feasel (1960–2012), American football player
- Greg Feasel (born 1958), American football player
