= John Kimmel =

John, Jon, Jonathan, named Kimmel, may refer to:

- John C. Kimmel (born 1954), U.S. thoroughbred racehorse trainer
- John Kimmel (accordionist) (1866–1942), German-American musician
- Jon Kimmel (born 1960), U.S. player of American football
- Jonathan Kimmel (born 1976), American writer-director

== See also ==
- Kimmel (disambiguation)
- Jonathan (disambiguation)
- John (disambiguation)
- Jon (disambiguation)
