= Darryl Hemphill =

American football player (born 1960)

No. 27, 25, 33
- Position: Defensive back

Personal information
- Born: March 29, 1960 (age 66); San Antonio, Texas, U.S.
- Listed height: 6 ft 0 in (1.83 m)
- Listed weight: 195 lb (88 kg)

Career information
- High school: Thomas Jefferson (San Antonio)
- College: West Texas A&M
- NFL draft: 1982: 10th round, 275th overall pick

Career history
- New York Jets (1982)*; Baltimore Colts (1982); Denver Gold (1984–1985); BC Lions (1987)
- * Offseason or practice squad member only
- Stats at Pro Football Reference

Darryl Hemphill (born March 29, 1960) is an American former professional football player who was a defensive back for the Baltimore Colts of the National Football League (NFL) in 1982. He played college football for the West Texas A&M Buffaloes. He also played professionally in the United States Football League (USFL) for the Denver Gold from 1984 to 1985 and for the BC Lions of the Canadian Football League (CFL) in 1987.
