= Sidney Kimmel (disambiguation) =

Sidney Kimmel may refer to:

- Sidney Kimmel (born 1928), U.S. businessman and philanthropist
- Sidney Kimmel Entertainment, U.S. production company for film and television
- Sidney Kimmel Medical College, Thomas Jefferson University, Philadelphia, Pennsylvania, USA
- Sidney Kimmel Comprehensive Cancer Center, Johns Hopkins University, Baltimore, Maryland, USA

== See also ==
- Sidney (disambiguation)
- Kimmel (disambiguation)
