= Greg Feasel =

American football player and baseball executive (born 1958)

No. 67, 70, 75, 77
- Position: Tackle

Personal information
- Born: November 7, 1958 (age 67); Barstow, California, U.S.
- Listed height: 6 ft 7 in (2.01 m)
- Listed weight: 300 lb (136 kg)

Career information
- High school: Barstow (Barstow, California)
- College: Abilene Christian; Barstow JC
- NFL draft: 1980: undrafted

Career history
- Seattle Seahawks (1980)*; Philadelphia Eagles (1981)*; Houston Oilers (1982)*; Denver Gold (1983–1985); Green Bay Packers (1986); Houston Oilers (1987)*; San Diego Chargers (1987)
- * Offseason or practice squad member only

Career NFL statistics
- Games played: 18
- Games started: 3
- Stats at Pro Football Reference

Gregory Duane Feasel (born November 7, 1958) is an American professional sports figure. He played in the United States Football League (USFL) and National Football League (NFL) as an offensive tackle during the 1980s, and is currently the president and chief operating officer for the Colorado Rockies of Major League Baseball (MLB).

== Biography ==
Born and raised in Barstow, California, Feasel graduated from Barstow High School, and initially attended Barstow Junior College. He transferred to Abilene Christian University (ACU) in Texas and he was later inducted as a member of the ACU Hall of Fame. His younger brother Grant (1960–2012) also played at ACU and in the National Football League (NFL).

Unselected in the 1980 NFL draft, Feasel failed to make an NFL team in his first three attempts. He played in the United States Football League (USFL) with the Denver Gold from 1983 to 1985, then in the NFL for the Green Bay Packers in 1986 and the San Diego Chargers in 1987.

Feasel joined the Colorado Rockies organization in 1996 and became chief operating officer in 2012. In April 2021, he was named team president, a position that had been vacant since the 2010 death of the prior president, Keli McGregor.

Feasel and his wife, Lynn, have a daughter.
