= Bob Niziolek =

American football player (born 1958)

No. 82, 89
- Position: Tight end

Personal information
- Born: June 30, 1958 (age 68); Chicago, Illinois, U.S.
- Listed height: 6 ft 4 in (1.93 m)
- Listed weight: 220 lb (100 kg)

Career information
- High school: Weber (IL)
- College: Colorado
- NFL draft: 1981: 8th round, 211th overall pick

Career history
- Detroit Lions (1981); New York Giants (1982)*; Denver Gold (1983–1984); Orlando Renegades (1985)
- * Offseason or practice squad member only
- Stats at Pro Football Reference

Bob Niziolek (born June 30, 1958) is an American former professional football tight end. He played for the Detroit Lions in 1981, the Denver Gold from 1983 to 1984 and for the Orlando Renegades in 1985.
