= Susquehanna Valley (disambiguation) =

The Susquehanna Valley is a region of low-lying lands in the U.S. states of New York, Pennsylvania, and Maryland surrounding the Susquehanna River.

Susquehanna Valley may also refer to:

- Binghamton metropolitan area
  - Susquehanna Valley Central School District (which includes Susquehanna Valley High School), commonly referred to as "Susquehanna Valley"
- Harrisburg–Carlisle metropolitan statistical area
- West Branch Susquehanna Valley in Pennsylvania
