= Kimmell =

Kimmell may refer to:

- Dana Kimmell (born 1959), American actress and model
- Lisa Marie Kimmell (1969–1988), U.S. murder victim
- Susan Kimmell (19th century), First Lady of Pennsylvania
- Kimmell, Indiana, USA; an unincorporated community in Sparta Township, Noble County
- Kimmell Park, Vincennes, Indiana, USA; a historic public park on the Wabash River

== See also ==
- Kimmel (disambiguation)
- Kimel (disambiguation)
