= Denver Gold =

Franchise in the United States Football League

General information
- Founded: 1982
- Folded: 1985
- Headquartered: Mile High Stadium in Denver, Colorado
- Colors: Black, Old Gold, White (1983, 1984) Black, Gold, White (1985)

Personnel
- Owners: 1983–1984 Ron Blanding; 1984–1985 Doug Spedding
- Head coach: 1983 Red Miller (4–7); 1983 Charley Armey (interim) (0–1); 1983–84 Craig Morton (12–12); 1985 Mouse Davis (11–8)

Team history
- Denver Gold (1983–1985)

Home fields
- Mile High Stadium (1983–1985)

League / conference affiliations
- United States Football League (1983–1985): Western Conference (1984–1985); Pacific Division (1983–1984)

The Denver Gold was an American football franchise in the United States Football League (USFL) from 1983 to 1985. The Gold played their home games at Mile High Stadium in Denver, Colorado; and were co-tenants in the spring with the Triple-A Denver Zephyrs baseball team (Denver Bears prior to 1984).

== History ==
=== Holding fast to the USFL's original blueprint ===
When the USFL first organized, league officials identified Denver as a critical market. However, they had a difficult time finding an owner. Ultimately, the league's first operations chief, John Ralston, got in touch with local real estate magnate Ron Blanding, an old friend from his days as head coach of the National Football League's Denver Broncos. After some pleading, Blanding agreed to sign on.

Blanding was easily the poorest owner in the league. He held fast to USFL founder David Dixon's original blueprint for the league, keeping tight controls on expenses (including player salaries) while heavily marketing the team in the Rockies.

The Gold's original coach was Red Miller, who led the Broncos to their first-ever Super Bowl and had known Blanding for several years. Miller was still a very popular figure in the area; fans were still smarting at how the Broncos fired him after the 1980 season. However, Miller bristled at Blanding's bargain-basement approach to running the team. The players used rented cars from Rent-a-Wreck, some of which were in rather poor condition. They had to rely on bare-bones meals, traveled to training camp in old school buses, and only had 100 uniforms for the 120 men they invited to camp. Blanding also balked at signing any of the Gold's first seven picks in the 1983 draft. It got to the point that an irate Miller once threatened to quit unless Blanding decided to "act like a fucking owner of a professional football team."

=== 1983 season ===
The Gold attempted to utilize some of the goodwill established by the more established Broncos by involving former Broncos players and coaches in the Gold organization for the Gold's inaugural 1983 season. Miller stocked his Gold roster with a number of former Broncos players. He also tapped his former starting quarterback with the Broncos, Craig Morton, as his offensive coordinator. Morton became head coach after Blanding fired Miller in the middle of the 1983 season. Despite one of the toughest defenses in the league, a weak offense kept the Gold out of the playoffs with a record of 7-11 in 1983. Blanding, however, was more satisfied with the fact that he actually turned a profit. He was also happy that the Gold led the league in attendance, with almost 42,000 fans per game. In part because of this, the league chose Denver to be the host of the inaugural USFL Championship Game.

=== 1984 season ===
==== 1984 season recap ====
After finishing the 1983 season making a small profit, the Gold went into the 1984 campaign with a bare-bones payroll. They did not sign any significant free agents or college draft picks and traded away two of their three starting linebackers during training camp. First they dealt RLB Kyle Whittingham (84 tackles, 3 fumble recoveries and 2 interceptions) in a package deal to New Jersey and then traded popular All-USFL LB Putt Choate, who had 178 tackles the previous year to the expansion San Antonio Gunslingers.

With one of the league’s lowest payrolls entering the 1984 season, the Gold began with a 7–1 record and were tied for first place in the USFL with the Philadelphia Stars and Birmingham Stallions after 8 weeks.

However, the turning point of the season was a 20–18 loss at the Louisiana Superdome to the New Orleans Breakers on April 22. With starting QB Craig Penrose not dressed, the Gold dropped what would be the first of five consecutive losses. Their early success was attributed to an opportunistic offense and a bend-but-don't break defense that seemed to overcome their personnel issues at linebacker.

During this time, Blanding put the Gold on the market. Unwilling to join his fellow owners in reckless spending, Blanding sold the team to auto dealer Doug Spedding for $10 million in April 1984. By some accounts, Blanding was the only USFL owner who got a net positive return on his investment. Spedding shared Blanding's frugal approach to running the team; if anything, he was even more cost-conscious than Blanding. He ran the Gold out of one of his dealerships. Despite being rather eccentric (according to Morton and Blanding, he was notorious for opening players' mail), years later many former Gold players praised Spedding for holding fast to the original USFL model.

Over the second half of the season, Morton had a QB shuffle that saw him use four different starters in Penrose, Bob Gagliano, Fred Mortensen and rookie Ken Hobart at various points over the last nine games. The Gold went 2–7 down the stretch and finished out of the playoffs. Acquired from Jacksonville in May, Hobart made his first pro start on June 8, a two-point loss to eventual champion Philadelphia, decided by a late field goal.

The offense ranked a respectable eleventh in passing and fourteenth in rushing among the eighteen USFL teams in 1984. Running back Harry Sydney was the main offensive weapon rushing for 961 yards and ten touchdowns to lead the Gold. Quarterback Craig Penrose tossed twelve TD's and was picked fourteen times over eleven starts in fourteen appearances.

The Gold offense was centered around a short passing game featuring running backs Sydney and Vincent White making 44 and 37 receptions respectively to finish 1–2 in team receiving. WR Leonard Harris was the most effective wideout for the Gold catching just 35 passes but had whopping 18.8 average per catch. Former New Jersey General TE Victor Hicks caught 31 passes to lead the tight ends.

The most stable and effective part of the Gold offense in 1984 was the offensive line. Tackles Steve Rogers and Ray Wagner along with guards George Yarno and Greg Feasel and centre Tom Davis did a solid job opening holes and creating pass protection most of the season.

The defensive unit struggled off and on throughout the season and actually shifted from a 3–4 set to a 4–3 defense late in the year to compensate for their lack of quality linebackers.

To address some of their needs, the Gold acquired DE Dennis Edwards (who had 6 sacks in 1983), from the Los Angeles Express and former Dallas Cowboy DE Bruce Thornton from the Chicago Blitz in mid-March. Thornton would contribute 6 sacks for the Gold in his limited playing time over the last 13 games.

In June, the Gold also acquired another former Dallas Cowboys alum in LB Bruce Huther from the 3–15 Pittsburgh Maulers. Huther was the starting middle linebacker over the last few games.

With the departure of Choate and Whittington in training camp, the Gold were not able to convert linebackers John Bungartz, Greg Gerken and Kelvin Newton into effective everyday starters. By the end of the season Bungartz and Gerken were relegated mostly to special teams and Newton was released before the season finale.

The unit did, however, have a relatively strong pass rush with DE Dave Stalls (12.5 sacks), DE Calvin Turner (10 sacks) and Thornton (6 sacks) having solid seasons.

The Gold secondary was the most stable part of the defensive unit with CB David Martin being named to the All-USFL team as a punt returner and a cornerback on The Sporting News All-USFL team in 1984. Martin led the USFL in punt returns with a 13.6 per return average on 22 run-backs, scoring 1 TD.

The secondary had four players record more the 100 tackles on the season in Martin, SS David Dumars, FS Steve Trimble and FS Tom Sullivan – an indication of the softness at the linebacker position.

In mid-season, the Gold special teams took a hit when punter Steve Gortz was injured in a game on April 14 in Pittsburgh. Instead of signing a replacement for Gortz, place kicker Brian Speelman took over the punting duties and served in a dual role for the remainder of the season.

Morton was widely seen as a players coach and it was reported that Spedding expected the Gold to make the playoffs in order for Morton to keep his job. However, unable to overcome the 2–7 slide, the team finished 9–9, one game out of the playoffs.

==== 1984 schedule and results ====
Week	Date	Opponent	Result	Record	Venue	Attendance
Preseason
1	Bye					
2	February 4	vs. Oakland Invaders	W 12–6	1–0	Francisco Grande, Arizona	
3	February 11	vs. Arizona Wranglers	W 31–14	2–0	Casa Grande, Arizona	
4	February 18	vs. Chicago Blitz	W 25–24	3–0	Casa Grande, Arizona	
Regular Season
1	February 26	at Los Angeles Express	W 27–10	1–0	Los Angeles Memorial Coliseum	32,082
2	March 3	at Oklahoma Outlaws	W 17–14 OT	2–0	Skelly Stadium	24,917
3	March 11	Michigan Panthers	L 0–28	2–1	Mile High Stadium	41,623
4	March 18	Tampa Bay Bandits	W 36–30	3–1	Mile High Stadium	19,173
5	March 25	at Memphis Showboats	W 28–24	4–1	Liberty Bowl Memorial Stadium	21,213
6	April 1	Arizona Wranglers	17–7	5–1	Mile High Stadium	31,666
7	April 9	Los Angeles Express	W 35–27	6–1	Mile High Stadium	19,115
8	April 14	at Pittsburgh Maulers	W 31–21	7–1	Three Rivers Stadium	16,773
9	April 22	at New Orleans Breakers	L 18–20	7–2	Louisiana Superdome	22,139
10	April 29	Birmingham Stallions	L 14–31	7–3	Mile High Stadium	35,262
11	May 5	at Oakland Invaders	L 17–20 OT	7–4	Oakland-Alameda County Coliseum	19,331
12	May 11	Chicago Blitz	L 17–29	7–5	Mile High Stadium	45,299
13	May 19	at Arizona Wranglers	L 6–41	7–6	Sun Devil Stadium	21,741
14	May 25	at San Antonio Gunslingers	W 27–20	8–6	Alamo Stadium	20,077
15	June 3	Houston Gamblers	L 20–36	8–7	Mile High Stadium	50,057
16	June 8	Philadelphia Stars	L 19–21	8–8	Mile High Stadium	30,755
17	June 16	at New Jersey Generals	L 7–27	8–9	Giants Stadium	28,915
18	June 22	Oakland Invaders	W 20–7	9–9	Mile High Stadium	32,623

==== 1984 front office and coaching staff ====
1984 Denver Gold staff
Front office: President – Ron Blanding; Vice president and general manager – Bill Roth; Vice-president – Andy Blanding; Head coaches: Head coach – Craig Morton; Offensive coaches: Offensive coordinator – Babe Parilli; Running backs – Gary Cabe; Wide receivers/tight ends – Don Frease; Offensive line – Jim Cadile	Defensive coaches: Assistant head coach/defensive coordinator – Jimmy Carr; Defensive line – Bill Dutton; Linebackers – Lonnie Warwick; Defensive backs – Greg Brown; Special teams coaches: Special teams – Phil Cancik

==== 1984 opening day roster ====
1984 Denver Gold opening day roster
Quarterbacks: 12 Craig Penrose *; 11 Ron Reeves; Running backs: 41 Bo Matthews FB *; 33 Calvin Murray; 24 Harry Sydney *; 44 Vincent White; Wide receivers: 84 John Arnold KR; 83 Elmer Bailey *; 80 Leonard Harris *; 86 Kevin Williams KR; Tight ends: 87 Victor Hicks; 88 Mike Hirn; 89 Bob Niziolek *	Offensive linemen: 52 Tom Davis C *; 75 Grant Feasel RG *; 76 Matt Miller RT *; 70 Harold Norfleet T; 62 Doug Payton G; 74 Steve Rogers LT *; 66 George Yarno LG *; Defensive linemen: 64 Jamie Giles NT; 72 Steve Johnson DE; 62 Tim Moore DE; 79 Pat Ogrin NT *; 77 Dave Stalls *; 99 Calvin Turner *	Linebackers: 57 John Bungartz MLB *; 50 Greg Gerken LB; 55 Jeff Harper *; 54 Kevin Hood LB; 53 Kelvin Newton *; Defensive backs: 27 Anthony Allen CB; 21 David Dumars SS *; 25 Darryl Hemphill FS; 13 David Martin *; 23 Nate Miller *; 47 Steve Trimble FS *; Special teams: 9 Steve Gortz P; 3 Brian Speelman K; 56 John Yarno LS	Developmental squad: 82 Neal Balholm WR; 37 Bob Biestek FB; 71 Mike Call NT; 10 Bob Gagliano QB; 42 John Higgins CB; 34 Bill Johnson RB; 51 Bill Matthews LB; 73 Mark Shoop DE; 32 Tom Sullivan FS; 78 Ray Wagner T	Injured reserve: Vacant; rookies in italics Asterisk (*) denotes starter Roster as of February 26, 1984; 40 Active, 10 Developmental

==== 1984 end-of-season roster ====
1984 Denver Gold end of season roster
Quarterbacks: 9 Ken Hobart *; 12 Craig Penrose; Running backs: 34 Bill Johnson RB; 41 Bo Matthews FB; 46 Dave Preston FB *; 24 Harry Sydney *; 44 Vincent White; Wide receivers: 84 John Arnold; 82 Neal Balholm; 80 Leonard Harris *; 86 Kevin Williams *; Tight ends: 87 Victor Hicks; 88 Mike Hirn; 89 Bob Niziolek *	Offensive linemen: 52 Tom Davis C *; 75 Grant Feasel RG *; 70 Harold Norfleet T; 62 Doug Payton G; 74 Steve Rogers LT *; 78 Ray Wagner T *; 66 George Yarno LG *; Defensive linemen: 72 Steve Johnson *; 79 Pat Ogrin *; 77 Dave Stalls *; 73 Mark Shoop DE; 60 Bruce Thornton DE; 99 Calvin Turner *	Linebackers: 57 John Bungartz LB; 50 Greg Gerken *; 55 Jeff Harper LB; 54 Kevin Hood LB; 59 Bruce Huther MLB *; 58 Jon Kimmel *; Defensive backs: 27 Anthony Allen CB; 21 David Dumars SS *; 25 Darryl Hemphill SS; 13 David Martin *; 23 Nate Miller *; 32 Tom Sullivan FS; 47 Steve Trimble FS *; Special teams: 3 Brian Speelman K/P; 56 John Yarno LS	Developmental squad: 68 Dennis Edwards DE; 10 Bob Gagliano QB; 76 Matt Miller T; 33 Calvin Murray RB; 22 James Stewart S; 30 Derrick Taylor CB	Injured reserve: 83 Elmer Bailey WR; 37 Bob Biestek FB; rookies in italics Asterisk (*) denotes starter Roster as of June 22, 1984; 43 Active, 7 Developmental

==== 1984 game summaries ====
===== Week 1: at Los Angeles Express =====
Quarter	1	2	3	4	Total
Gold	0	10	0	17	27
Express	3	7	0	0	10

at Los Angeles Coliseum, Los Angeles, California

- Date: Sunday, February 26, 1984
- Game time: 1:00 p.m. PT
- Game weather: 61 °F (34 °C) (partly cloudy)
- Game attendance: 32,082
- TV: ABC

The Gold began their second season on the road against their Pacific Division foe, the Los Angeles Express at the fabled Los Angeles Coliseum which was undergoing a facelift in parts of the stadium in advance of the 1984 Summer Olympic Games scheduled for July 1984.

With under six minutes left in a 10–10 game, Gold QB Craig Penrose found WR Elmer Bailey in the end zone for a 6-yard scoring play to give Denver a late 17–10 lead. On the next series, Denver safety Darryl Hemphill picked off Express QB Tom Ramsey and returned it 42-yards for the major to quickly seal a 27–10 victory for the Gold.

The Express got on the board first when rookie K Tony Zendejas hit a 36-yard field goal 9:08 into the contest to give the host club a 3–0 lead after the first quarter.

Early in the second, Gold FB Bo Matthews plunged in from 1-yard out to give the Gold a 7–3 just 2:15 into the period. The Express, however, responded when starting QB Tom Ramsey threw a 12-yard scoring pass to WR Jo Jo Townsell in the back of the end zone to give Los Angeles a 10–7 lead with 4:04 left in the quarter.

However, the Gold quickly drove into Express territory on the last drive of the first half and setup K Brian Speelman for a 43-yard field goal with just 0:03 remaining in the half.

After a scoreless third quarter, the Gold blew the game wide open with under six minutes to go in the contest.

The Gold (1–0) travel to Tulsa to take on the Oklahoma Outlaws (1–0) next Saturday (Mar.3rd) while the Express (0–1) host the Birmingham Stallions (0–1) next Sunday (Mar. 4).

Scoring Summary:

Q1 – LAX – 5:52 – Tony Zendejas 42-yard FG (3–0 LAX)
Q2 – DEN – 14:45 – Bo Matthews 1-yard run (Speelman kick) (7–3 DEN)
Q2 – LAX – 4:04 – Jo Jo Townsell 12-yard TD pass from Tom Ramsey (Zendejas kick) (10–7 LAX)
Q2 – DEN – 0:53 – Brian Speelman 43-yard FG (10–10)
Q4 – DEN – 5:50 – Elmer Bailey 6-yard TD pass from Craig Penrose (Speelman kick) (17–10 DEN)
Q4 – DEN – 4:39 – Darryl Hemphill 42-yard interception return (Speelman kick) (24–10 DEN)
Q4 – DEN – 2:01 – Brian Speelman 46-yard FG (27–10 DEN)

Individual Statistics:

Rushing

DEN – Sydney 14–62, Matthews, Bo 10–13–1, Williams, K. 1–9, White 1–2
LAX – Nelson 10–49, Harrington 7–28, Ramsey 1–9, Allen 2–0, Ellis 1–0

Passing

DEN – Penrose 16–22–166–1–1, Sydney 0–1–0–0–0
LAX – Ramsey 24–33–147–1–3, Partridge 1–1–(−3)–0–0

Receiving DEN – Bailey 3–41–1, Harris 3–34, Sydney 3–27, Niziolek 2–15, Hicks 2–10, Williams 1–23, Murray 1–10, Matthews, Bo 1–6
LAX – Hersey 5–37, Ellis 5–22, Moore 3–28, Sherrod 3–12, Nelson 3–11, Townsell 2–20, Harrington 2–12, Allen 1–5, Boddie 1–(−3)

===== Week 2: at Oklahoma Outlaws =====
Quarter	1	2	3	4	OT	Total
Gold	0	0	14	0	3	17
Outlaws	0	7	0	7	0	14

at Skelly Stadium, Tulsa, Oklahoma

- Date: Saturday, March 3, 1984
- Game weather: 41 °F (23 °C) (overcast, cool)
- Game attendance: 25,403

The Gold continued their two-game road trip to start the season in Tulsa, OK against the expansion Oklahoma Outlaws. Led by former Tampa Bay Buccaneers star QB Doug Williams, the Outlaws won their opener the previous week, 7–3 over the Pittsburgh Maulers.

After a scoreless first quarter, Oklahoma jumped out to a 7–0 lead when former Pittsburgh Steeler FB Sidney Thornton scored on a 7-yard scoring pass from QB Doug Williams with 0:28 left in the first half.

The Gold, however, struck quick again late in the third quarter when RB Vincent White scored on a one-yard plunge with 4:47 left in the third quarter. Just 2:25 later, RB Harry Sydney scored on a 13-yard scoring romp after the Gold recovered a botched snap by Outlaws' P Bob Boris.

In the fourth, the Outlaws tied the contest when Williams scored on a 1-yard keeper 1:24 into the quarter to tie the score at 14–14.

After the Outlaws turned over the ball on the opening kickoff in Overtime, Gold K Brian Speelman hit a-21-yard field goal just 0:31 into the extra period to lift the Gold to a 17–14 victory. The win lifted the Gold to a 2–0 record to start the 1984 USFL season and early possession of first place in the Pacific Division.

Scoring Summary:

Q2 – OKL – 0:28 – Sidney Thornton 7-yard TD pass from Doug Williams (Crum kick) (7–0 OKL)
Q3 – DEN – 4:47 – Vincent White 1-yard run (Speelman kick) (7–7)
Q3 – DEN – 2:22 – Harry Sydney 13-yard run (Speelman kick) (14–7 DEN)
Q4 – OKL – 13:36 – Doug Williams 1-yard run (Crum kick) (14–14)
OT – DEN – 0:31 – Brian Speelman 21-yard FG (17–10 DEN)

Individual Statistics:

Rushing

DEN – Sydney 14–57–1, White 9–19–1, Matthews, Bo 5–13, Murray 1–8
OKL – Thornton 14–49, D. Williams 4–22–1, James 8–14, Ragsdale 2–(1), Boris 2–(−29)

Passing

DEN – Penrose 14–23–164–0–1
OKL – Williams 24–45–259–1–0

Receiving

DEN – Hicks 3–74, Harris 3–28, White 3–21, Sydney 3–10, K Williams 1–19, Bailey 1–12
OKL – Thornton 6–34–1, Crane 5–48, Turner 4–55, James 4–20, Wheeler 2–57, Blair 1–29, Hughes 1–10, Ragsdale 1–6

=== 1985 season ===
==== 1985 season recap ====
In hopes of getting into the playoffs, Spedding hired Houston Gamblers offensive coordinator Mouse Davis for the 1985 season. Rumors had actually abounded that Davis was coming to Denver for much of the latter part of the 1984 season. Davis was the chief advocate of the Run & Shoot offense in the USFL and had implemented the system in Houston that helped make Jim Kelly a superstar.

Davis acquired former Chicago Blitz quarterback Vince Evans, who shared playing time with Bob Gagliano, a fourth-string quarterback under Morton. Although neither quarterback was particularly effective in leading the offense, Davis's offensive schemes and the team's strength at other positions helped the Gold finish fourth in the league in total offense.

Unfortunately, just after Davis took over, the USFL announced that it would switch to a fall schedule for the 1986 season. Spedding was one of two owners (the other being Tampa Bay Bandits owner John F. Bassett) to vote to stay on a spring schedule, knowing that the Gold could not even begin to go head-to-head with the Broncos. His guess proved right. While the Gold had been one of the USFL's attendance leaders, fans in the Denver area were not about to abandon the Broncos. Despite finally getting into the playoffs with an 11–7 record, the Gold's attendance crashed from over 20,000 to 14,400 fans per game.

As a result, despite finishing second in the Western Conference, they were forced to play on the road against the lower-seeded Memphis Showboats under pressure from ABC. The network, who had considerable influence over the USFL due to the structuring of the league's television contract, did not want the embarrassment of having a game played in a near-empty stadium. The Gold were shelled 48–7.

==== 1985 schedule and results ====
Week	Date	Opponent	Result	Record	Venue	Attendance
Preseason
1	February 2	vs. Los Angeles Express	T 17–17	0–0–1	Long Beach, California	
2	February 9	vs. Portland Breakers	W 27–9	1–0–1	Pomona, California	
3	February 16	at San Antonio Gunslingers	L 13–36	1–1–1	Alamo Stadium	
Regular Season
1	February 24	at Oakland Invaders	L 10–31	0–1	Oakland-Alameda County Coliseum	23,622
2	March 3	at Birmingham Stallions	W 40–23	1–1	Legion Field	27,400
3	March 10	Portland Breakers	W 29–17	2–1	Mile High Stadium	17,870
4	March 18	at Houston Gamblers	L 17–36	2–2	Houston Astrodome	33,747
5	March 26	San Antonio Gunslingers	W 16–2	3–2	Mile High Stadium	13,901
6	March 31	Orlando Renegades	W 21–17	4–2	Mile High Stadium	10,217
7	April 8	Arizona Outlaws	W 28–7	5–2	Mile High Stadium	12,769
8	April 15	at Tampa Bay Bandits	L 17–33	5–3	Tampa Stadium	40,000
9	April 21	Los Angeles Express	W 51–0	6–3	Mile High Stadium	13,165
10	April 27	Memphis Showboats	L 17–33	6–4	Mile High Stadium	8,207
11	May 5	at San Antonio Gunslingers	W 35–9	7–4	Alamo Stadium	9,753
12	May 12	at Arizona Outlaws	W 42–28	8–4	Sun Devil Stadium	5,731
13	May 19	New Jersey Generals	W 28–24	9–4	Mile High Stadium	29,129
14	May 23	Oakland Invaders	L 16–31	9–5	Mile High Stadium	12,372
15	May 30	at Los Angeles Express	W 27–20	10–5	Los Angeles Memorial Coliseum	3,059
16	June 9	Houston Gamblers	W 16–13	11–5	Mile High Stadium	12,553
17	June 14	at Portland Breakers	L 17–23	11–6	Civic Stadium	18,953
18	June 23	at Jacksonville Bulls	L 6–42	11–7	Gator Bowl	32,428
Playoffs
Quarterfinals	June 30	at Memphis Showboats	L 7–48	0–1	Liberty Bowl Memorial Stadium	34,528

==== 1985 opening day roster ====
Denver Gold 1985 Opening Day Roster (at 24-Feb-85) * Denotes Starter
Quarterbacks: 8 Vince Evans QB*; 10 Bob Gagliano QB; Running backs: 34 Bill Johnson RB*; 37 Todd Gerhart RB; Wide receivers: 88 Marc Lewis WR*; 82 Lonnie Turner WR*; 84 John Arnold WR; Slot backs: 80 Harris, Leonard SB*; 44 White, Vincent SB*; 85 Stegall, Gill SB; 83 Calip, Brad SB	Offensive linemen: 75 Feasel, Greg LT*; 76 Miller, Matt RT*; 66 Yarno, George LG*; 63 Downing, Walt RG*; 52 Davis, Tom C*; 78 Wagner, Ray OT; 69 Hausauer, Ron OG; 74 Nease, Mike OG; Defensive linemen: 70 Mikolas, Doug NT*; 60 Thornton, Bruce LDE*; 99 Turner, Calvin RDE*; 79 Ogrin, Pat NT; 73 Taliferro, Mike NT; 72 Johnson, Steve DE	Linebackers: 56 Irvin, Terry LOLB*; 59 Nevens, John LILB*; 57 Bungartz, John RILB*; 53 McKibben, Mike ROLB*; 50 Blinka, Stan LB; 55 Walls, Craig LB; 58 Kilkenny, Tom LB; 54 Hope, Neil LB; Defensive backs: 13 David Martin LCB*; 23 Miller, Nate RCB*; 47 Trimble, Steve FS*; 25 Hemphill, Darryl SS*; 27 Loveall, Calvin CB; 42 Harris, Nate FS; 32 Sullivan, Tom FS; 24 Carswell, Ernie SS	Special teams: 3 Speelman, Brian K/P; 'Inactive Week #1: 11 Fisher, Mike QB; 30 Hill, Norman FB; 87 Johnson, Kelley WR; 89 Johnson, Troy WR; 86 Williams, Kevin WR; 51 Gerken, Greg LB; 40 Delaney, Jeff FS	Injured reserve None * Denotes Starter; 43 Active, 7 Developmental

=== Demise of the franchise and the league ===
The Gold would have been in an impossible position even without their attendance figures falling through the floor after the USFL announced it would move to the fall. Staying at Mile High Stadium would have been a logistical nightmare, and no other stadium in the area was large enough or suitable enough for temporary use.

Realizing it would be untenable to stay in Denver, Spedding announced in November that he planned to move the Gold to Portland, Oregon to take the place of the departed Portland Breakers. However, just three months later, Spedding sold the Gold's player contracts to the Jacksonville Bulls. Although the move was billed as a merger, Spedding retained the Gold's intellectual properties. He seriously considered joining Bassett's proposed spring football league before Bassett's failing health prevented that league from launching. Instead Spedding, Bassett, and the USFL as a whole were doomed by the ill-advised attempt to move the playing season to the fall in 1986 in direct competition with the more-established NFL.

The USFL's high-stakes anti-trust suit against the NFL ended in an award of only US$3.00 to the USFL. The jury cited the league's abandonment of Denver and several other major markets as one reason why it awarded the USFL only nominal damages. With no new funds to cover its high spending, the USFL cancelled its 1986 season and folded.

== Single-season leaders ==
Rushing Yards: 1261 (1985), Bill Johnson

Receiving Yards: 1432 (1985), Leonard Harris

Passing Yards: 2695 (1985), Bob Gagliano

== Season-by-season results ==
Season records
Season	W	L	T	Finish	Playoff results
1983	7	11	0	3rd Pacific	–
1984	9	9	0	3rd WC Pacific	–
1985	11	7	0	7th WC	Lost Quarterfinal (Memphis)
Totals	27	28	0	(including playoffs)	
