= Gill Stegall =

American gridiron football player (1961–1988)

No. 85
- Position: Wide receiver

Personal information
- Born: April 30, 1961; Searcy, Arkansas
- Died: April 23, 1988 (aged 26); Searcy, Arkansas
- Listed height: 5 ft 8 in (1.73 m)
- Listed weight: 160 lb (73 kg)

Career information
- High school: Searcy (AR)
- College: Arkansas State; Harding

Career history
- Denver Gold (1985); Tampa Bay Bandits (1986)*; Montreal Alouettes (1986–1987); St. Louis Cardinals (1987)*; Detroit Lions (1988)*
- * Offseason or practice squad member only

Career CFL statistics
- Games played: 7
- Receptions: 13
- Receiving yards: 288
- Touchdowns: 1

Gill Anthony Stegall (April 30, 1961 – April 23, 1988) was an American professional football wide receiver and slotback who played one season in the United States Football League (USFL) for the Denver Gold, and one season in the Canadian Football League (CFL) for the Montreal Alouettes. He also spent time in the National Football League (NFL) for the St. Louis Cardinals and Detroit Lions, but did not play.

== Early life and college football career ==
Stegall was born April 30, 1961, in Searcy, Arkansas. He played college football at Arkansas State University from 1980 to 1982 and then transferred to Harding University in 1984, playing wide receiver for the Bisons.

== Professional football career ==
Stegall was an 11th round draft choice in 1985 by the Denver Gold of the United States Football League (USFL), coached by Mouse Davis. Stegall set a professional football record for most catches in a game in May 1985, making 16 catches against the Los Angeles Express in a televised game. He had 32 catches for the season for 397 yards and 3 touchdowns. In 1986, Stegall was briefly acquired by the Tampa Bay Bandits of the USFL, before the league folded. He then made a move to the Canadian Football League (CFL), signing with the Montreal Alouettes. Stegall had 13 receptions for 288 yards and one touchdown for the Alouettes. Stegall signed with the St. Louis Cardinals of the National Football League (NFL) in September 1987 as a replacement player, but did not play.

He was signed by the Detroit Lions in February 1988. He died two months later from drowning while fishing with family members in the Little Red River in Arkansas, while saving his nephew who had fallen into the water.
