= Matt Miller (offensive lineman) =

American football player (born 1956)

No. 77, 71, 76
- Position: Offensive tackle

Personal information
- Born: July 30, 1956 (age 70); Durango, Colorado, U.S.
- Listed height: 6 ft 6 in (1.98 m)
- Listed weight: 270 lb (122 kg)

Career information
- High school: Durango
- College: Colorado (1975–1978)
- NFL draft: 1979: 4th round, 95th overall pick

Career history
- Cleveland Browns (1979–1982); Denver Gold (1984–1985)

Awards and highlights
- First-team All-American (1978); First-team All-Big Eight (1978)
- Stats at Pro Football Reference

Matthew Peter Miller (born July 30, 1956) is an American former professional football player who was an offensive tackle for four seasons with the Cleveland Browns of the National Football League (NFL). He was selected by the Browns in the fourth round of the 1979 NFL draft, making him a member of the Kardiac Kids. Miller played college football for the Colorado Buffaloes and was on the 1978 College Football All-America Team. Miller also played two seasons for the Denver Gold in the United States Football League (USFL).

== Early life and college ==
Matthew Peter Miller was born on July 30, 1956, in Durango, Colorado. He attended Durango High School in Durango.

Miller played college football for the Colorado Buffaloes of the University of Colorado Boulder. He was on the freshman team in 1975 and was a three-year letterman from 1976 to 1978. As a senior in 1978, he earned United Press International (UPI) first-team All-American and Associated Press and UPI first-team All-Big Eight honors.

== Professional career ==
Miller was selected by the Cleveland Browns in the fourth round, with the 95th overall pick, of the 1979 NFL draft. He officially signed with the team on July 2. He played in all 16 games for the Browns during his rookie year in 1979. Miller was placed on injured reserve on August 1, 1980, and missed the entire 1980 season. He played in all 16 games in 1981. He appeared in nine regular season games and one postseason game in 1982. Miller was released by the Browns on August 29, 1983.

On October 27, 1983, Miller signed with the Denver Gold of the United States Football League (USFL) for the 1984 USFL season. He played in 11 games, starting ten, for the Gold in 1984. He was also a member of the Gold during the 1985 season.

== Personal life ==
Miller is now a professor in Mechanical and Aerospace Engineering at Cornell University. He is featured in several articles with daughter Chaney Miller, who graduated from Cornell University in 2014 with a degree in civil engineering.
