= Payton Gendron =

American mass murderer (born 2003)

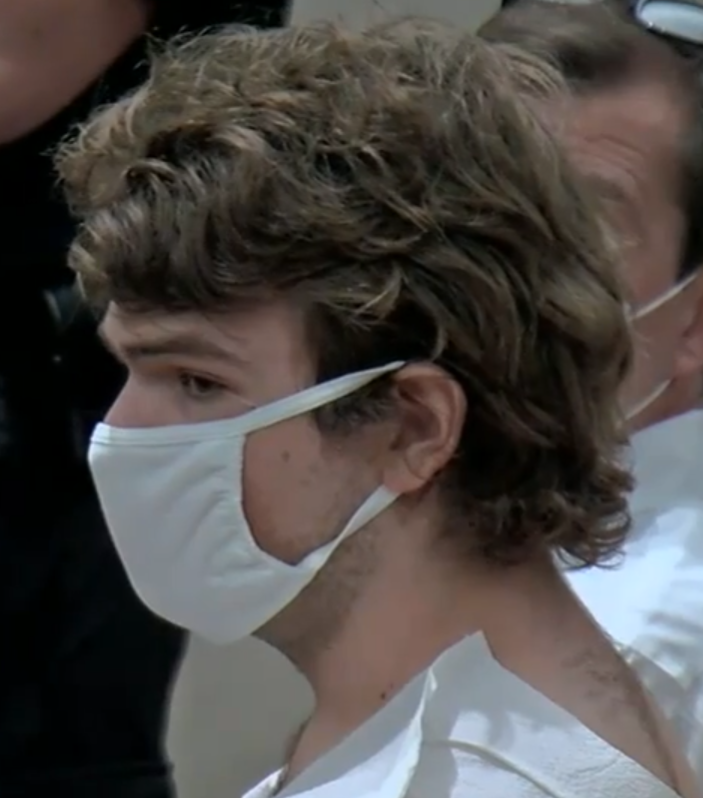
- Gendron following his initial arrest in 2022
- Born: Payton Spencer Gendron; June 20, 2003 (age 23); Johnson City, New York, U.S.
- Known for: Perpetrator of the 2022 Buffalo shooting
- Status: Incarcerated
- Motive: Anti-black racism; White supremacy; Belief in the Great Replacement and white genocide conspiracy theories; Accelerationist neo-Nazism
- Convictions: 25 counts (Note: State: Domestic act of terrorism motivated by hate; First-degree murder (10 counts); Second-degree murder as a hate crime (10 counts); Attempted first-degree murder (3 counts); Second-degree criminal possession of a weapon)
- Criminal charges: 27 counts (Note: Federal: Hate Crime Resulting in Death (10 counts); Discharge of a Firearm to Commit Murder (10 counts); Hate Crime Act Involving An Attempt to Kill (3 counts); Use and Discharge of a Firearm During and in Relation to a Crime of Violence (3 counts); Hate Crime Act Involving an Attempt to Kill)
- Sentence: State: Eleven consecutive life sentences without the possibility of parole plus 90 years

Details
- Date: May 14, 2022; 4 years ago
- Locations: Buffalo, New York, U.S.
- Target: African Americans
- Killed: 10
- Injured: 3
- Weapons: 5.56 Bushmaster XM-15 E2S Target AR-15-style semi-automatic rifle; .30-06 Savage Axis XP bolt-action rifle (unused, left in car); 12-gauge Mossberg 500 pump-action shotgun (unused, left in car)

Payton Spencer Gendron (born June 20, 2003) is an American mass murderer, white supremacist, and neo-Nazi who committed a racially motivated mass shooting at a Tops Friendly Markets in Buffalo, New York, in which he killed 10 people and injured 3 others, on May 14, 2022. Gendron, who was 18 years old at the time, had traveled three and a half hours to the supermarket from his hometown of Conklin, New York.

Gendron livestreamed part of the attack on Twitch until the livestream was shut down by the service in under two minutes. He was inspired to carry out the attack after learning about numerous white supremacist mass murderers through 4chan during isolation caused by the COVID-19 pandemic. His main inspiration was Brenton Tarrant, the perpetrator of the Christchurch mosque shootings, who also livestreamed his attack online.

On May 14, 2022, at around 2:30 p.m., Gendron arrived at the supermarket, where he shot 13 people, 11 of whom were black and 2 of whom were white. At 2:36 p.m., Gendron had gone to the front of the building, which was surrounded by law enforcement, and was arrested. He had planned to attack more locations. He was taken into custody and charged with over 40 federal and state counts, including first-degree murder and terrorism. He pleaded not guilty to all the charges on May 19.

On November 28, 2022, Gendron pleaded guilty to all state charges in the shooting, including murder, domestic terrorism, and hate crimes in an attempt to avoid the federal death penalty. On February 15, 2023, Gendron was sentenced to 11 concurrent life sentences without the possibility of parole. Federal charges are still ongoing, and the federal prosecution also expressed their intention to seek the death penalty. His federal trial began on October 13, 2026.

== Early life and education ==
Payton Spencer Gendron was born on June 20, 2003, in Johnson City, New York, and raised in the nearby town of Conklin. He was described by friends as a quiet, reclusive, and polite person; however, he exhibited a range of idiosyncratic behaviors, including wearing a hazmat suit to class. He attended Richard T. Stank Middle School. He graduated from Susquehanna Valley High School in 2021 and was a student at SUNY Broome Community College at the time of the shooting, but rarely attended in-person classes. He also briefly worked at Conklin Reliable Market. His parents are civil engineers and, according to his neighbors, Gendron had previously stated an intention to become one as well.

=== Investigation of previous threat ===
In June 2021, Gendron had been investigated for making a "generalized threat" or "a threatening statement" at his high school by the police in Broome County. Accounts of the nature of the threat vary; one government official told The Buffalo News that Gendron had threatened to commit a mass shooting at a graduation ceremony, while NBC News states that a teacher had asked him about his plans after the school year, to which Gendron responded, "I want to murder and commit suicide." Contradicting these accounts, in an online chat log from December 9, 2021, Gendron describes staying in the emergency room of a hospital for 20 hours on May 28, 2021, as a result of stating his intention to commit murder–suicide in an online assignment for his economics class, in which Gendron was asked what he wished to do when he retired. He was referred to a hospital for mental health evaluation and counseling but was released after being held for a day and a half. Gendron described the hospital stay as a very negative experience from which he gained encouragement to take action.

Gendron told police that he was merely joking; however, Gendron later wrote online that this was actually a well-executed bluff. He was not charged in connection with the incident since, according to investigators, he had not made a specific enough threat to warrant further action. The New York State Police did not seek an order from a state court to remove guns from Gendron's possession. The mental health evaluation was not an involuntary commitment, which would have prohibited him from buying guns under federal law.

== Weapons ==
Gendron cleared the background check by filling in Form 4473, as is typically required under U.S. federal law. During the purchase of the Bushmaster XM-15 AR-15–style rifle used in the shooting, the seller said that Gendron passed the background check and that the seller did not remember Gendron. Gendron cleared another check while purchasing a shotgun at a store in the neighboring town of Great Bend, Pennsylvania, located 8.7 miles (14.0 km) away from his Conklin house, saying that he would use it for target practice; this shotgun was later recovered by police from Gendron's car. Since New York state prohibits the purchase and possession of ammunition magazines capable of holding more than ten rounds of ammunition, Gendron traveled to Pennsylvania from his home in New York state to purchase a 30-round ammunition magazine. Before the shooting, Gendron wrote that he had purchased a rifle and illegally modified it in order for it to accept 30-round magazines; as New York has a ban on assault weapons. Gendron also wrote that he selected an AR-15–style rifle for its effectiveness, and that he specifically selected the Bushmaster XM-15 for its notoriety.

The police said that Gendron had been in Buffalo in early March, and was also there the day before the shooting, having carried out reconnaissance at the Tops supermarket. According to police, he had researched previous hate-motivated attacks and shootings. According to a childhood friend of Gendron's, Gendron came to the friend's house the day before the shooting and left five boxes of ammunition. Supposedly, Gendron told the friend that he left the ammunition because he needed to rearrange his own house, and that he would retrieve the ammunition later.

On one of his rifles, Gendron had reportedly written the word nigger along with mocking references to reparations. Gendron's gun also reportedly was covered with references to white supremacist mass murderers Dylann Roof, Robert Bowers, Brenton Tarrant, and John Earnest, the acronym SYGAOWN (Stop Your Genocide Against Our White Nations), far-right slang "Buck status: broken", the year 2083—a reference to the manifesto of Anders Behring Breivik—and a depiction of the Archangel Michael's Cross of the fascist Romanian Iron Guard. A law enforcement source told The Daily Beast that Gendron had also written on his rifle the names of one or more victims of the Waukesha Christmas parade attack. On the weapons in his car, which had not been used during the shooting, he reportedly had written "White Lives Matter" and, according to CNN, "what appears to be the name of a victim of a crime committed by a Black suspect."

== Manifesto ==
Prior to the shooting, Gendron wrote and released online a 180-page manifesto that primarily references the topic of mass immigration. The manifesto was originally posted on Google Docs on the evening of May 12, two days before the attack, and according to file data, it has not been modified since. Federal law enforcement sources told CNN that they were reviewing the document along with Gendron's 673-page online diary. The manifesto contains biographical information of the author identical to that of Gendron, such as the author sharing Gendron's birth date.

The author describes himself as someone who identified as falling "in the mild-moderate authoritarian left category", while expressing qualified support for the "LGB" community, and holding white supremacist, anti-Semitic, populist, and ecofascist views. He claims to have adopted these ideological stances after he visited the discussion board /pol/ on 4chan, an imageboard, as well as the website The Daily Stormer beginning in May 2020, on which he saw "infographics, shitposts, and memes" around the beginning of the COVID-19 pandemic in the United States. The manifesto primarily promotes the white nationalist and far-right Great Replacement conspiracy theory of Renaud Camus, which claims that elites are promoting immigration and decreasing white birth rates in an attempt to subject White people to a genocide. The manifesto also says that Jews and societal elites are responsible for transgender inclusivity and non-white immigration, that black people disproportionately kill white people, and that non-whites will overwhelm and wipe out the white race.

The manifesto's author also expressed support for far-right mass shooters Dylann Roof, Anders Behring Breivik, and Brenton Tarrant. About 28% of the document is plagiarized from other sources, especially Tarrant's manifesto. As much as 57% of the text-based ideological sections were plagiarized in this manner; this was measured by excluding the sections which consisted of Internet meme images, other pictures taken from online, and logistical discussion about the equipment for the attack.

The planning for the attack commenced in January 2022. Buffalo was targeted because it was the city closest to the author's home that had the most black residents. He then proceeded to select the ZIP Code area within Buffalo with the highest percentage of black residents. The manifesto includes extensive details about preparations for the supermarket attack itself and a plan, following the initial shooting, to travel to a majority-black neighborhood in Buffalo to conduct further attacks. It characterizes the attack as having been "intended to terrorize all nonwhite, non-Christian people and get them to leave the country."

=== Activity on chat logs and online diary ===
Gendron is also reported to have had an account on the chat platform Discord, with the same username as the Twitch user who livestreamed the attack. Thousands of chat logs were retrieved from the account's postings in a private chatroom, which were written in the form of an online diary and range from November 2021 to May 13, 2022. The logs include photos of Gendron, and the author claimed to be Gendron. Police said that they believed the messages are genuine. The chat logs reference a speeding ticket that is consistent with one received by Gendron. The logs also include to-do list items seemingly indicating that the author was preparing for the attack. The chat logs indicated that the attack was originally planned to occur on March 15 so that the author could commemorate the anniversary of the Christchurch mosque shootings. However, the attack was delayed due to the author developing a case of COVID-19. The logs contained indications from as early as November 2021 that the author planned to livestream a mass shooting targeting black people. He claimed authorship of a post on 4chan from November 9, 2021, that said, "a brenton tarrant event [sic] will happen again soon."

The online diary also had sketches of the layout of the inside of the Tops supermarket. The diary mentions visits to the supermarket on March 8. During these visits, the author notes being challenged by the security guard, which the author described as a close call. He also noted the numbers of black people and white people in the supermarket during his visits. The author considered attacking various locations, including a Walmart in Rochester, New York, and institutions with predominantly black attendees such as churches, malls and elementary schools. He also considered attacking synagogues but decided against it because March 15 would not fall on a Saturday (the Jewish sabbath), thus synagogues were not likely to have many attendees at the author's desired time to attack. He wrote that he used data available through Google to determine when the busiest times in the supermarket would be.

The author of the online diary described himself as being socially isolated. He said, "I would like to [be able to] say I had quite a normal childhood (<18) but that is not the case." He also said, "It's not that I actually dislike other people, it's just that they make me feel so uncomfortable I've probably spent actual years of my life just being online. And to be honest I regret it. I didn't go to friends' houses often or go to any parties or whatever. Every day after school I would just go home and play games and watch YouTube, mostly by myself." In another entry, he added, "If I could go back maybe I'd tell myself to get the fuck off 4chan ... and get an actual life."

At one point in the chat logs, the author describes killing and mutilating a cat, and posted images and gave a brief description on why he did it: "When I came home at ~10:30 I was eating pizza bites when I heard my cat Paige scream from the garage” Gendron wrote. “I quickly enter and the gray cat was attacking her. I then spent the next hour and a half chasing the cat around the garage and stabbing it with my knife (the camo one)." He expressed feeling no empathy or emotions after killing the cat. He told his parents about this and buried the stray in his backyard.

The chat logs also include occasional suicidal ideation and self-doubt from the author.

In other entries, he posted photos of modifications he made to his rifle so that it could be equipped with 30-round magazines, while acknowledging that this was illegal in New York state. He also posted details about obtaining other equipment for a planned attack, such as body armor and a helmet.

=== Prior to the shooting ===
About 30 minutes before the shooting began, invitations to the chatroom that hosted the online diary logs were sent to a small group of other Discord users. After that point, at least fifteen other users joined the chatroom and would have been able to view the chat logs. According to a Discord spokesperson, they found no indication that any other users were aware of the diary before that time. The logs' author also sent others online messages containing links to the Twitch livestream which he would later use to show the attack. According to the message attached to the invite, Discord users could also view a livestream through the Discord chatroom, as opposed to the Twitch livestream. The chatroom was disabled when Discord learned about its alleged relationship to the shooting.

Other than the online diary, chat logs related to the attack were also retrieved from a second chatroom on Discord where members primarily discussed weapons as a dedicated topic. There, the user reported to have been Gendron sought advice regarding equipment such as body armor. Following the shooting, the livestream footage quickly leaked to multiple other social media sites, including Facebook, Twitter, Instagram, and Reddit.

== 2022 Buffalo shooting ==
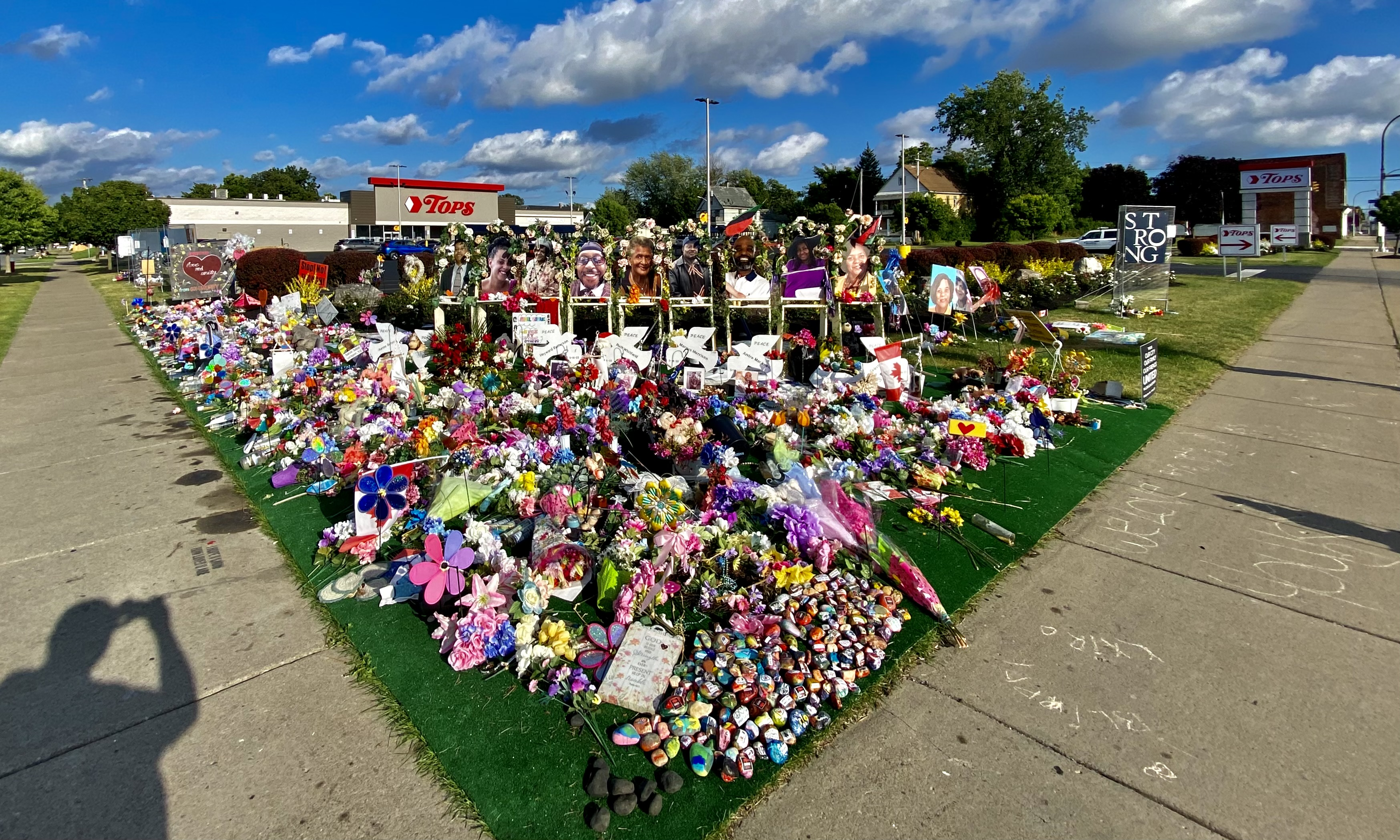
Memorial for the victims of the shooting outside of the supermarket

At around 2:30 p.m. EDT (UTC−04:00), Gendron arrived at the Tops supermarket on Jefferson Avenue, in a predominantly black neighborhood in Buffalo, New York. He was armed with a Bushmaster XM-15 AR-15–style rifle, illegally modified to accept high-capacity magazines, and he had multiple 30-round ammunition magazines. In his car, he had a Savage Arms Axis XP hunting rifle and a Mossberg 500 shotgun. He was wearing body armor, a military helmet, and a recording camera attached to his helmet through which he livestreamed the attack on the online service Twitch. As he approached the grocery store entrance, he was recorded on his livestream saying "just got to go for it".

Gendron first shot four people in the parking lot, killing three. He then entered the store, shooting eight more people and killing six. At 2:31 p.m., Buffalo police received a call reporting shots fired at the store. The first responding officers and firefighters arrived a minute later and reported bodies lying outside the building. At 2:34 p.m., a dispatcher started informing responding officers of an active shooter situation at the store.

According to a law enforcement source, Gendron yelled racial slurs during the incident. Many employees and customers used the store's break room to hide from Gendron and barricaded the door with a heavy desk. Other customers were hidden by employees in the milk cooler and said Gendron shot through the coolers, but the milk cartons stopped the bullets. At some point, an armed security guard, former Buffalo Police Department officer Aaron Salter Jr., shot at him. Due to Gendron's body armor, Salter's bullet did not stop him. Gendron returned fire at Salter, who died at the scene. At an early point in the shooting, Gendron aimed his rifle at an injured white person, the store manager, hiding behind a checkout counter but he apologized and did not shoot.

By 2:36 p.m., Gendron had gone to the front of the building, where patrol officers were able to talk him into dropping his gun after he reportedly aimed it at his neck. A total of 60 shots were fired during the shooting. After his arrest, Gendron made statements regarding his motive and state of mind.

== Legal proceedings ==
Gendron was arraigned in Buffalo City Court, a New York State Court. Represented by a public defender, Gendron entered a not guilty plea to multiple charges of first-degree murder. A felony hearing was scheduled to begin on May 19 in front of a grand jury. He was held without bail under suicide watch. On the same day, the Attorney General of the United States, Merrick Garland, confirmed that the United States Department of Justice was investigating the shooting as a hate crime and as an act of racially motivated violent extremism.

On May 19, it was announced that Gendron was indicted on the charge of first-degree murder by a grand jury in a decision that had been handed up the day prior. Gendron briefly appeared in court on May 19. On June 1, a grand jury issued a 25-count indictment against Gendron. The jury charged him with "one count of domestic terrorism motivated by hate", as well as "10 counts of first-degree murder as a hate crime, 10 counts of second-degree murder as a hate crime, three counts of attempted second-degree murder as a hate crime and one count of second-degree criminal possession of a weapon", according to The Washington Post. Gendron was arraigned in Erie County Court on June 2, 2022, and pled not guilty to all 25 charges.

On June 3, 2022, a filing made on behalf of one of the survivors from the attack sought a court order for the preservation of a number of items in the possession of Gendron's parents. The filing sought to preserve, among other things, any of his available cellphones, computers (and web browsing history), travel and school records, video game consoles, and receipts for firearms and ammunition. Additionally, the filing requested that his parents be made to provide pretrial depositions in court by July 29.

=== State ===
On November 17, Gendron agreed to plead guilty to all state charges. On November 28, he pled guilty to fifteen state-level counts: ten counts of first-degree murder, three counts of attempted murder motivated by hate, criminal weapons possession, and domestic terrorism motivated by hate. On February 15, 2023, Gendron was denied youthful offender status and received 11 life sentences without the possibility of parole plus 90 years.

During his sentencing hearing at Erie County Court the same day, Gendron gave a statement, saying;

"I'm very sorry for all the pain I forced the victims and their families to suffer through. I'm very sorry for stealing the lives of your loved ones. I can not express how much I regret all of the decisions I made leading up to my actions on May 14. I did a terrible thing that day. I shot and killed people because they were black. Looking back now, I can't believe I actually did it. I believed what I read online and acted out of hate. I know I can't take it back, but I wish I could. And, I don't want anyone to be inspired by me and what I did."

As of June 2024, there is no capital punishment in New York state. He was later transferred to Livingston County Jail in Geneseo, New York.

=== Federal ===
As of the date of his state sentencing, Gendron was still facing federal charges. In December 2022, Gendron's lawyer indicated that he would be willing to plead guilty to the federal charges to avoid the death penalty. On January 12, 2024, the Department of Justice said that it would seek the death penalty, making this the first death penalty case under Garland, who had in the past expressed his opposition to capital punishment. In explaining their reasons to seek the death penalty, the prosecutors stated that Gendron's decision to select the supermarket showed he planned to "maximize the number of Black victims", his beliefs in white supremacy, and the substantial planning and premeditation behind the crime, were among the factors they considered in seeking capital punishment for Gendron. Jury selection in Gendron's trial began on October 13, 2026.

== See also ==
- Domestic terrorism in the United States
- List of mass shootings in the United States in 2022
- Timeline of terrorist attacks in the United States
- Joseph Christopher - another racially motivated murderer from Buffalo whose first victim was killed outside a supermarket.
