= Kümmel =

Kümmel is a German surname literally meaning "caraway", which may be a metonymic reference to spice trader or farmer. Notable people with the surname include:

- Ernst Kümmel (born 1925), German footballer and manager
- Henry Barnard Kümmel (1867–1945), American geologist
- Ina Kümmel (born 1967), German cross-country skier
- Otto Kümmel (1874–1952), German art historian and museum director
- Peeter Kümmel (born 1982), Estonian cross-country skier
- Reiner Kümmel (born 1939), German physicist
- Werner Kümmel (1905–1995), German New Testament scholar and academic

== See also ==
- Kümmel (liqueur)
- Kümmel's disease
- Kimmel (surname)
