= Craig Penrose =

American football player (born 1953)

No. 12, 11
- Position: Quarterback

Personal information
- Born: July 25, 1953 (age 73); Woodland, California, U.S.
- Listed height: 6 ft 3 in (1.91 m)
- Listed weight: 211 lb (96 kg)

Career information
- High school: Woodland
- College: San Diego State
- NFL draft: 1976: 4th round, 107th overall pick

Career history
- Denver Broncos (1976–1979); New York Jets (1980); Denver Gold (1983–1984)

Awards and highlights
- NCAA passing yards leader (1975); First-team All-Coast (1975)

Career NFL statistics
- Passing attempts: 117
- Passing completions: 55
- Completion percentage: 47.0%
- TD–INT: 5–12
- Passing yards: 711
- Passer rating: 41.2
- Stats at Pro Football Reference

Craig R. Penrose (born July 25, 1953) is an American former professional football player who was a quarterback in the National Football League (NFL), primarily as a back-up. He spent five seasons in the NFL with the Denver Broncos (1976–1979) and the New York Jets (1980) and two seasons with the United States Football League (USFL)'s Denver Gold. His family origin is Cornish American.

He played college football in a pass-happy system at San Diego State, where such passing was common.

- 1974: 132/235 for 1,683 yards with 10 TD vs 9 INT.
- 1975: 198/349 for 2,660 yards with 15 TD vs 24 INT.

== See also ==
- List of college football yearly passing leaders
