= David Martin (cornerback) =

American football player (born 1959)

No. 33, 9, 34, 13, 25
- Position: Cornerback

Personal information
- Born: March 15, 1959; Philadelphia, Pennsylvania, U.S.
- Listed height: 5 ft 9 in (1.75 m)
- Listed weight: 193 lb (88 kg)

Career information
- High school: John Bartram (Philadelphia)
- College: Villanova
- NFL draft: 1981: 9th round, 240th overall pick

Career history
- Detroit Lions (1981)*; Kansas City Chiefs (1982)*; Denver Gold (1983–1985); Arizona Wranglers (1985); San Diego Chargers (1986); Montreal Alouettes (1986); Buffalo Bills (1987)
- * Offseason or practice squad member only

Awards and highlights
- 3× All-USFL (1983–1985); Second-team All-East (1980)

Career NFL statistics
- Sacks: 1
- Stats at Pro Football Reference

David Martin (born March 15, 1959) is an American former professional football player who was a cornerback in the National Football League (NFL), Canadian Football League (CFL) and United States Football League (USFL). He played college football for the Villanova Wildcats.

== Early life ==
Martin was born and grew up in Philadelphia, Pennsylvania, and attended John Bartram High School. He was named to the Philadelphia Public League's All-Decade football team for the 1970s by the Philadelphia Daily News.

== College career ==
Martin was a member of the Villanova Wildcats for four seasons. He tied for the team lead with four interceptions as a sophomore. He finished his collegiate career with ten interceptions and returned 31 punts for 387 yards and two touchdowns and 16 kickoffs for 302 yards.

== Professional career ==
Martin was selected in the ninth round of the 1981 NFL draft by the Detroit Lions, but was cut during training camp. He was signed in by the Denver Gold of the newly formed United States Football League (USFL) in 1983 and was named All-USFL in his first season after intercepting six passes. Martin was named All-USFL as both a defensive back and as a punt returner 1984. Martin was traded to the Arizona Outlaws during the 1985 season and was again named All-USFL.

Martin began the 1986 season with the San Diego Chargers and played in four games with the team before being released. He was signed by the Montreal Alouettes of the Canadian Football League (CFL) and spent the rest of 1986 with the team. Martin became a free agent when Montreal suspended team operations and was signed by the Buffalo Bills on July 27, 1987. Martin was cut at the end of training camp, but was re-signed by the Bills in October 1987 as a replacement player during the 1987 NFL players strike, recording a sack in three games played before being released after the strike ended.
