= T. J. Houshmandzadeh =

American football player (born 1977)

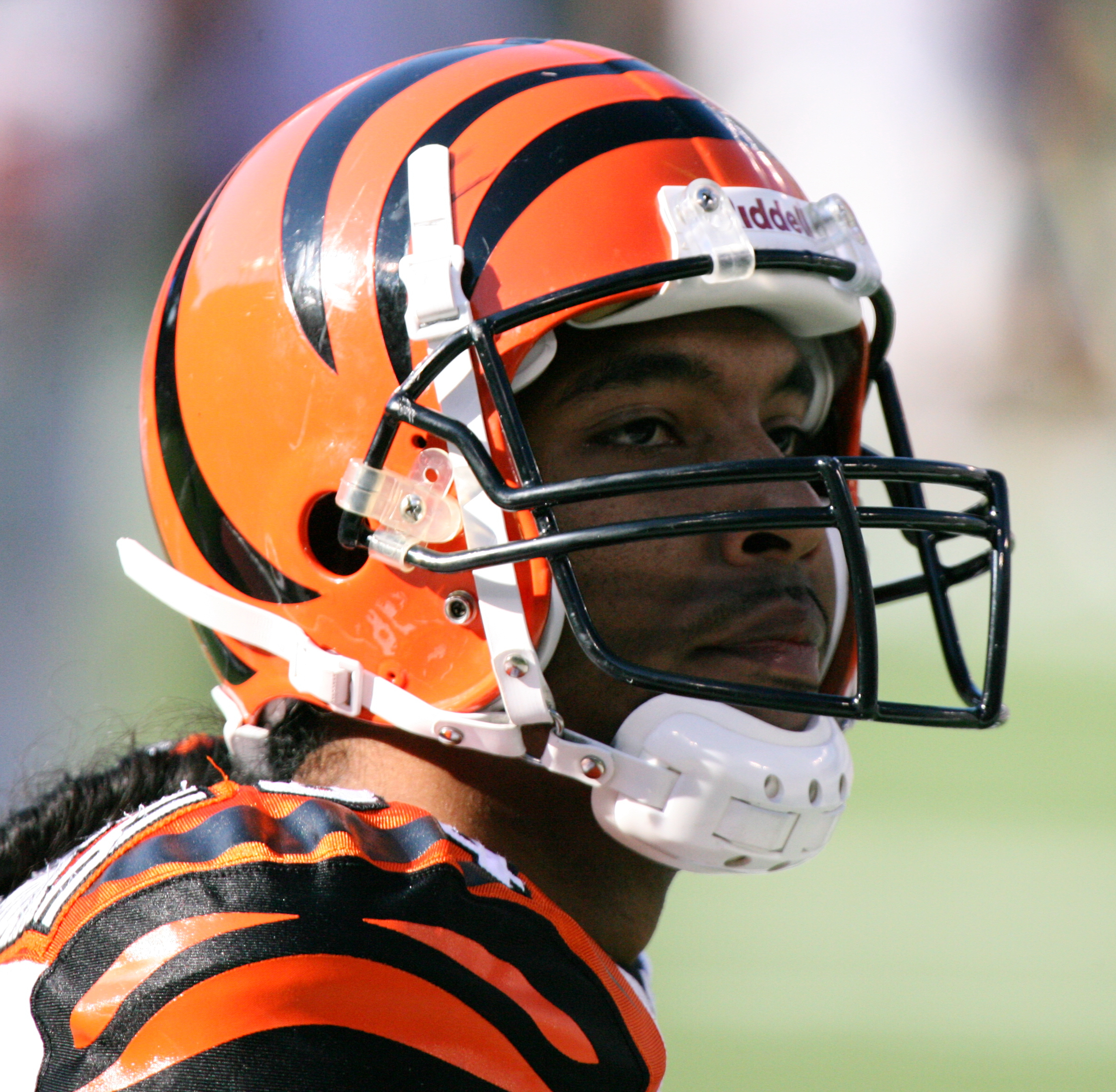
- Houshmandzadeh with the Cincinnati Bengals in 2006

No. 84
- Position: Wide receiver

Personal information
- Born: September 26, 1977 (age 49); Barstow, California, U.S.
- Listed height: 6 ft 2 in (1.88 m)
- Listed weight: 203 lb (92 kg)

Career information
- High school: Barstow
- College: Cerritos (1998–1999); Oregon State (2000)
- NFL draft: 2001: 7th round, 204th overall pick

Career history

Playing
- Cincinnati Bengals (2001–2008); Seattle Seahawks (2009); Baltimore Ravens (2010); Oakland Raiders (2011)

Coaching
- Long Beach Polytechnic (2016–2017) WR; Long Beach Polytechnic (2018) OC; Santa Margarita (2025) WR

Awards and highlights
- Pro Bowl (2007); NFL receptions co-leader (2007); Cincinnati Bengals 40th Anniversary Team; Second-team All-Pac-10 (2000); 2× First-team All-Mission Conference (1998, 1999)

Career NFL statistics
- Receptions: 627
- Receiving yards: 7,237
- Receiving touchdowns: 44
- Stats at Pro Football Reference

Touraj Houshmandzadeh Jr. (/ˌhʊʃmənˈzɑːdə/ HUUSH-mən-ZAH-də; born September 26, 1977) is an American former professional football player who was a wide receiver in the National Football League (NFL). He played college football for the Oregon State Beavers and was selected by the Cincinnati Bengals in the seventh round of the 2001 NFL draft. After playing with the Bengals, Houshmandzadeh played for the Seattle Seahawks in 2009, the Baltimore Ravens in 2010 and the Oakland Raiders in 2011.

Following his playing career, he became a coach at Long Beach Poly High School. He also works as a football analyst for FS1.

== College career ==
=== Cerritos College ===
Houshmandzadeh dropped out of Barstow High School in Barstow, California. He later enrolled at Cerritos College. In his two seasons with the Cerritos College Falcons in 1998 and 1999, he was a two-time First-Team All-Mission Conference selection at wide receiver and kickoff returner. He wanted to play as running back his freshman year, but believing he was too tall to play running back, he voluntarily moved to the wide receiver position. He finished his Cerritos College career with 1,152 receiving yards on 65 receptions. He also had two 103-yard kickoff returns and a 92-yard punt return.

=== Oregon State University ===
Based on his junior college performance, Houshmandzadeh was offered an athletic scholarship at Oregon State University by then head coach Dennis Erickson.

In his sole season as a starter for Oregon State in the 2000 season, Houshmandzadeh caught 42 passes for 656 yards and six touchdowns. He helped his team defeat Notre Dame in the 2001 Fiesta Bowl. He contributed a receiving touchdown, assisting his team to a 41–9 victory.

At Oregon State, he played with Chad Johnson, who would later be his teammate in the NFL with the Cincinnati Bengals.

== Professional career ==
Pre-draft measurables
Height	Weight
6 ft 1 1/4 in (1.86 m)	211 lb (96 kg)
Values from Pro Day

=== Cincinnati Bengals ===
Houshmandzadeh was selected by the Cincinnati Bengals in the seventh round with the 204th overall pick in the 2001 NFL draft.

Houshmandzadeh made his NFL debut in Week 3 of the 2001 season against the San Diego Chargers. As a rookie, Houshmandzadeh had recorded 21 receptions for 228 yards, while also being used to return punts and kickoffs. His most notable achievement was in a game against the Cleveland Browns, when he set a franchise record with 126 punt return yards.

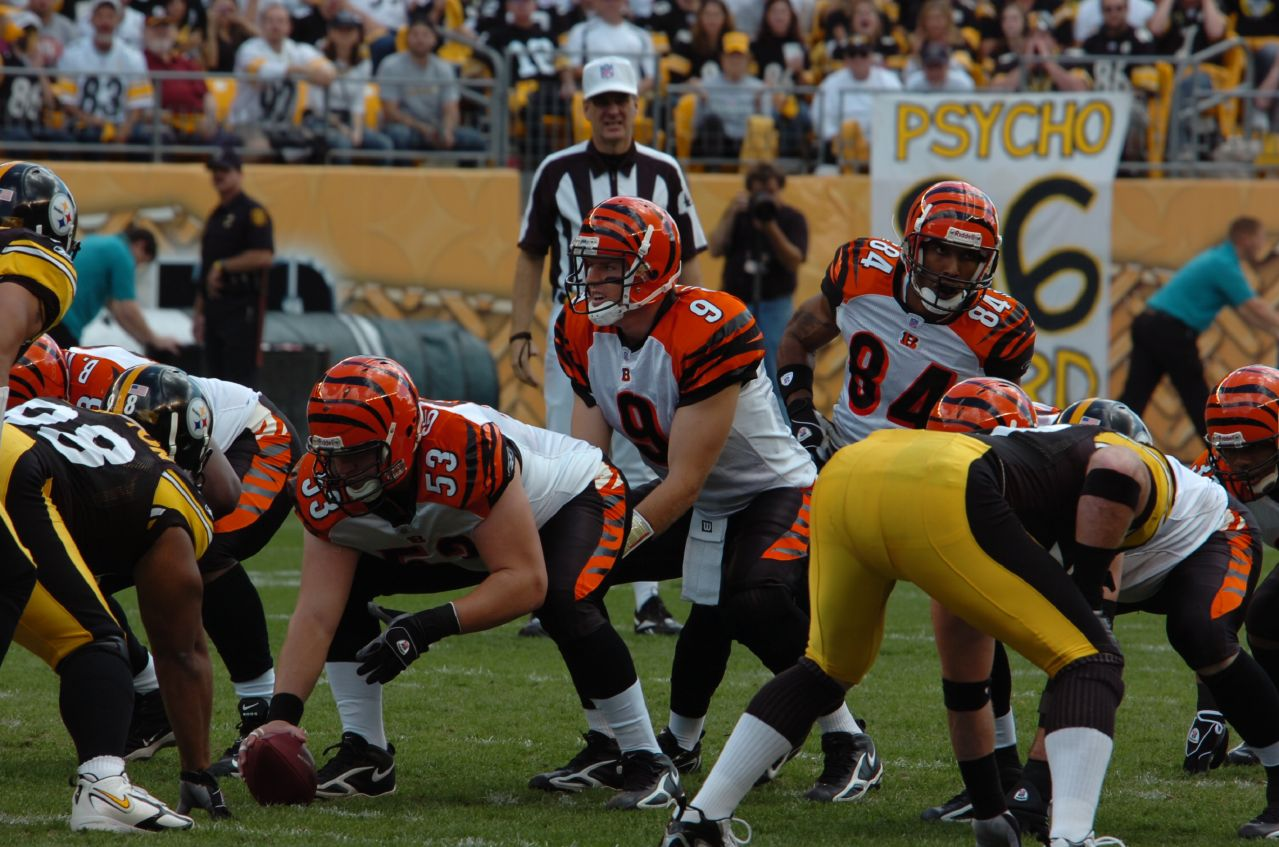
Houshmandzadeh (84) with the Bengals in 2006.

In Week 13 of the 2002 season, against the Baltimore Ravens, Housmandzadeh scored his first professional touchdown on a four-yard reception. During the 2002 season, Houshmandzadeh had 41 receptions for 492 receiving yards and one receiving touchdown in 16 games and five starts.

Houshmandzadeh missed the 2003 season with a severe hamstring injury. In 2004, he was listed as the team's third receiver behind Peter Warrick and Chad Johnson. However, Warrick became injured and Houshmandzadeh was promoted to the starting lineup with Johnson.

In Week 3 of the 2004 season, against the Baltimore Ravens, Housmandzadeh had seven receptions for 116 receiving yards. In Week 12, against the Cleveland Browns, he had two receiving touchdowns in their 58–48 victory. In Week 13, in another game against Baltimore, he had ten receptions for 171 yards and one touchdown in the 27–26 victory. In Week 14, against the New England Patriots, he had 12 receptions for 145 receiving yards. During the 2004 season, Houshmandzadeh had 73 receptions for 978 receiving yards and four receiving touchdowns in 16 games and 13 starts.

"They're both unique", said former Bengals quarterback Carson Palmer of Johnson and Houshmandzadeh. "They do completely different things well and complement each other perfectly. T. J.'s a physical guy; a physical blocker, physical when he gets the ball. He's like (the Pittsburgh Steelers') Hines Ward."

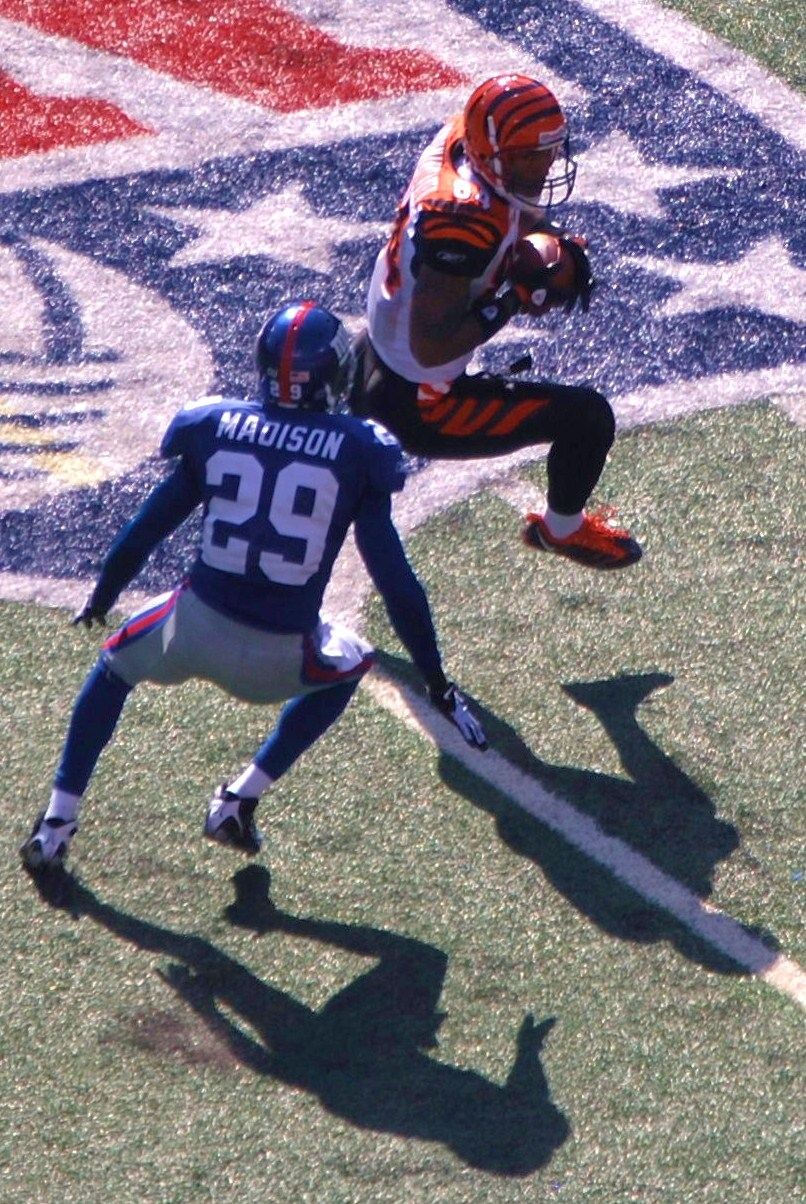
Houshmandzadeh with the Bengals playing against the New York Giants on September 21, 2008.

With the release of Warrick during the 2005 training camp, Houshmandzadeh retained the starting position and he and Johnson soon earned recognition for being among the NFL's most exciting receiving tandems. In March 2005, the Bengals rewarded Houshmandzadeh with a four-year, $13 million contract and an undisclosed bonus.

In Week 4 of the 2005 season, Houshmandzadeh had eight receptions for 105 yards in a 16–10 victory over the Houston Texans. In Week 12, against the Baltimore Ravens, he had nine receptions for 147 yards and a touchdown in the 42–29 victory. In Week 13 against the Pittsburgh Steelers, he had two receiving touchdowns in the 38–31 victory. In the 2005 season, Houshmandzadeh had 78 receptions for 956 receiving yards and seven receiving touchdowns. In the Wild Card Round against the Steelers, he had a receiving touchdown in the 31–17 loss.

In the 2006 season, Houshmandzadeh battled a recurring minor foot injury that kept him out of the first two games of the regular season. In Week 3 of the 2006 season, Houshmandzadeh had nine receptions for 94 receiving yards and two receiving touchdowns against the Pittsburgh Steelers. He won AFC Offensive Player of the Week for his game against Pittsburgh. In Week 6, he had ten receptions for 102 yards and a touchdown against the Tampa Bay Buccaneers. In Week 10, he suffered a mild concussion during the Bengals 49–41 loss to the San Diego Chargers from an early hit by Chargers free safety Marlon McCree. In Week 13 against the Baltimore Ravens, he had ten receptions for 106 yards and a touchdown in the 13–7 victory. In the following game, he had eight receptions for 118 yards and a touchdown against the Oakland Raiders in the 27–10 victory. He finished the 2006 season with 90 receptions for 1,081 yards and nine touchdowns, all career highs. His 90 receptions and nine touchdown catches led his team. He and Chad Johnson also became the first Bengals teammates ever to each record over 1,000 receiving yards in the same season.

Houshmandzadeh before a home game in 2007

Houshmandzadeh opened the 2007 season by scoring a touchdown against the Baltimore Ravens in a 27–20 victory and two touchdowns in the 51–45 loss to the Cleveland Browns in Week 2. Against the Seattle Seahawks in Week 3, Houshmandzadeh totaled 141 yards on 12 receptions for one touchdown in the 24–21 loss. In Week 4, against the New England Patriots, he had 12 receptions for 100 yards and a touchdown. In the following week, he had eight receptions for 145 yards and two touchdowns against the Kansas City Chiefs. He ended up having a streak of eight games with at least one touchdown to start the season. By the end of the year, he finished with a franchise record 112 receptions for 1,143 yards and 12 touchdowns. His 112 catches tied him with Wes Welker of the Patriots for the most in the NFL. He was also selected to the Pro Bowl for the first time in his career.

In Week 3 of the 2008 season, Houshmandzadeh recorded 12 receptions for 142 receiving yards and one touchdown in the 26–23 loss to the New York Giants. In Week 5, against the Dallas Cowboys, he had two receiving touchdowns. In Week 11, in a 13–13 tie to the Philadelphia Eagles, he had 12 receptions for 149 yards and one touchdown. In 2008, Houshmandzadeh had 92 catches for 904 yards and four touchdowns. He did this while Carson Palmer was out with injury for most of the year.

=== Seattle Seahawks ===
Houshmandzadeh was signed by the Seattle Seahawks on March 2, 2009, to a five-year $40 million contract with $15 million guaranteed. He had also been courted by the Minnesota Vikings. The Cincinnati Bengals reportedly gave him an offer, but he countered the statement saying "Cincinnati's offer wasn't enough for me to continue to play there, I think I should be able to start fresh." He jokingly went on to say "I want to win some games for once", which is a reference to the Bengals' history of losing. The Bengals swept the AFC North on their way to a 10–6 record, while Seattle finished 5–11. Houshmandzadeh, however, had a decent year statistically, with 79 catches for 911 yards for an 11.5 yard receiving average, but only scored three touchdowns. On September 4, 2010, the Seahawks released Houshmandzadeh.

=== Baltimore Ravens ===
Houshmandzadeh signed a one-year deal with the Baltimore Ravens on September 6, 2010, for the veteran league minimum of $855,000. However, since his $7 million salary with the Seahawks was guaranteed in his previous contract, Seattle paid him the remaining $6.15 million for 2010. During his short tenure in Baltimore, Houshmandzadeh recorded only 30 receptions for 398 yards. He managed to score only three touchdowns, although one of them won the Week 4 divisional matchup against the Pittsburgh Steelers. In the 2010 Divisional Round loss against the Steelers, Houshmandzadeh dropped a critical pass which would've converted a fourth down and potentially changed the outcome of the 31–24 loss. That, combined with his frequent complaining and general poor play, led to him not being re-signed. "If I go to the right team I'll shock a lot of people", he said while he was a free agent.

=== Oakland Raiders ===
The Oakland Raiders signed Houshmandzadeh on November 1, 2011. The signing reunited Houshmandzadeh with former Bengals quarterback Carson Palmer, as well as head coach Hue Jackson, who was a former assistant with the Bengals.

On December 4, 2011, against the Miami Dolphins, he caught his first touchdown as a member of the Oakland Raiders, a 40-yard pass from quarterback Carson Palmer, which was his only catch in the 34–14 rout by Miami. He finished 2011 with 11 catches for 146 yards for a 13.3 yard receiving average and one touchdown. This would end up being his final season in the NFL, as he later retired.

=== Records ===
- Team record most punt return yards in a game (126) vs. Cleveland, November 25, 2001
- Tied NFL lead most receptions in a season (112) in 2007.

== Personal life ==
=== Andy Furman incident ===
Andy Furman, a sports commentator on Cincinnati's 700 WLW was fired on November 1, 2006, for referring to Houshmandzadeh as a racist on the air. On October 5, 2006, Houshmandzadeh failed to appear for a paid appearance on the show. The next evening, Furman, a New York City native, alleged that he heard from another source that Houshmandzadeh called him a "punk-ass white boy" for criticizing the no-show. Houshmandzadeh denied making the comment.

=== Restraining order ===
On December 4, 2023, Houshmandzadeh filed for a restraining order against a woman who had allegedly been so obsessed with him that she changed her last name to Houshmandzadeh. It was also claimed that the woman had posed as the mother of his kids online and had sent harassing mail and personal items to his home.

== NFL career statistics ==
Legend
**Bold**	Career high

=== Regular season ===
Year	Team	Games		Receiving					Rushing					Kick returns					Punt returns					Fumbles	
Year	Team	GP	GS	Rec	Yds	Avg	Lng	TD	Att	Yds	Avg	Lng	TD	Att	Yds	Avg	Lng	TD	Att	Yds	Avg	Lng	TD	Fum	Lost
2001	CIN	12	1	21	228	10.9	23	0	–	–	–	–	–	10	185	18.5	23	0	12	**163**	**13.6**	**86**	0	**3**	**3**
2002	CIN	16	5	41	492	12.0	31	1	–	–	–	–	–	**13**	**288**	22.2	**44**	0	**24**	117	4.9	34	0	**3**	2
2003	CIN	DNP																							
2004	CIN	16	13	73	978	**13.4**	**62**	4	6	51	8.5	16	0	10	227	**22.7**	32	0	11	88	8.0	28	0	0	0
2005	CIN	14	12	78	856	12.3	43	7	**8**	**62**	7.8	**17**	0	–	–	–	–	–	–	–	–	–	–	1	1
2006	CIN	14	13	90	1,081	12.0	40	9	3	6	2.0	13	0	–	–	–	–	–	–	–	–	–	–	0	0
2007	CIN	16	15	**112**	**1,143**	10.2	42	**12**	5	14	2.8	8	0	–	–	–	–	–	–	–	–	–	–	2	2
2008	CIN	15	15	92	904	9.8	46	4	1	9	**9.0**	9	0	–	–	–	–	–	8	79	9.9	15	0	0	0
2009	SEA	16	16	79	911	11.5	53	3	–	–	–	–	–	–	–	–	–	–	–	–	–	–	–	2	2
2010	BAL	16	2	30	398	13.3	56	3	–	–	–	–	–	–	–	–	–	–	–	–	–	–	–	1	1
2011	OAK	9	0	11	146	13.3	40	1	–	–	–	–	–	–	–	–	–	–	1	0	0.0	0	0	0	0
Total		146	92	627	7,237	11.5	62	44	23	142	6.2	17	8	33	700	21.2	44	0	56	447	8.0	86	0	12	11

=== Postseason ===
Year	Team	Games		Receiving					Fumbles	
Year	Team	GP	GS	Rec	Yds	Avg	Lng	TD	Fum	Lost
2005	CIN	1	1	**4**	25	6.3	8	**1**	0	0
2010	BAL	2	0	**4**	**66**	**16.5**	**28**	0	0	0
Total		3	1	8	91	11.4	28	1	0	0

== Post-playing career ==
After retiring from football, Houshmandzadeh became a football analyst for Fox Sports 1.

During the 2015 offseason, he interned as a coach for the Bengals as part of the Bill Walsh Minority Fellowship Program. He became the wide receivers coach at Long Beach Polytechnic High School in 2016, serving two years before being named the varsity offensive coordinator in 2018.

In 2024, Houshmandzadeh partnered with Snoop Dogg to create the Snoop & Housh Flag Football League.

== Personal life ==
Houshmandzadeh was born to an Iranian American father and an African American mother.

His surname was often shortened to "Housh" or "Hoosh" by fans.

In Electronic Arts' Madden NFL series of games, Houshmandzadeh's surname was shortened to "Houshmandz". The game limited last names to 12 characters. The limit was increased to allow his and other players' names to be displayed in full beginning with Madden NFL 2010.

Houshmandzadeh appeared in a popular fantasy football television commercial from 2006 where a fantasy player struggled to pronounce his surname, stumbling with words like "Houshamazilla", "Houshmazode", "Houshvadilla" and "Houshyomama". That season, former teammate Chad Ochocinco introduced him as "T. J. Who's-your-momma" on television during an ESPN Monday Night preseason game on August 28. Houshmandzadeh would have a career season that year. ESPN later referenced Houshmandzadeh's 2006 season in 2011 in a similar fantasy football commercial with the "Karaoke Draft of '06", with a fantasy football fan singing Houshmandzadeh's name to the tune of the 1977 hit song Barracuda by Heart.
