= Vincent White (American football) =

American football player and coach (born 1961)

Personal information
- Born: August 26, 1961 (age 65); Kansas City, Missouri, U.S.
- Listed height: 5 ft 8 in (1.73 m)
- Listed weight: 185 lb (84 kg)

Career information
- High school: Mullen (Denver, Colorado)
- College: Stanford
- NFL draft: 1983: 6th round, 163rd overall pick

Career history

Playing
- New York Jets (1983)*; Denver Gold (1983–1985)
- * Offseason or practice squad member only

Coaching
- Rangeview HS (CO) (1985) Running backs coach; Oregon Tech (1986–1988) Offensive coordinator & wide receivers coach; Tennessee–Martin (1989) Offensive coordinator & wide receivers coach; Pacific (CA) (1990–1992) Offensive coordinator & wide receivers coach; SMU (1993) Wide receivers coach; Maryland (1994) Wide receivers coach; SMU (1995–1996) Wide receivers coach; Pittsburgh (1997–1999) Running backs coach; Arizona State (2000) Running backs coach; Utah (2001–2002) Running backs coach; Saint Mary's (CA) (2003) Head coach; Delaware State (2005) Running backs coach & tight ends coach; Southeast Missouri State (2006–2010) Associate head coach, offensive coordinator, & quarterbacks coach; New Mexico (2011) Running backs coach; Fordham (2012) Assistant head coach & wide receivers coach; Lincoln (MO) (2013) Offensive coordinator; Delaware State (2016) Associate head coach & running backs coach; Delaware State (2017) Associate head coach & offensive coordinator; Mullen HS (CO) (2018) Head coach

Awards and highlights
- First-team All-Pac-10 (1982)

Head coaching record
- Regular season: 1–11 (.083) (college); 4–7 (.364) (high school)

Vincent Dwayne White (born August 26, 1961) is an American football coach and former running back who was the head football coach at J.K. Mullen High School in Denver, CO.

== Early life and college ==
Born in Kansas City, Missouri, White later grew up in Denver and attended Mullen High School. White helped Mullen win the Colorado Class 3A title as a senior in 1978.

White attended Stanford University and played at running back on the Stanford Cardinal football team from 1979 to 1982. Cumulatively at Stanford, White had 1,689 yards and 12 touchdowns on the ground, in addition to 1,722 receiving yards and 16 touchdown catches. White graduated from Stanford in 1984 with a bachelor's degree in sociology.

=== College stats ===
NO	YDS	AVG	TDS	ATT	YDS	AVG	TDS
162	1722	10.6	18	311	1689	5.4	12

== Professional playing career ==
In the 1983 NFL draft, the New York Jets selected White 163rd overall in the sixth round. However, White instead played for the Denver Gold of the United States Football League (USFL). In three seasons, White rushed for 739 yards and three touchdowns and received for 1,051 yards and seven touchdowns.

=== USFL stats ===
NO	YDS	AVG	TDS	ATT	YDS	AVG	TDS
46	385	8.4	2	166	688	4.1	3

== Coaching career ==
In 1985, White began his coaching career at Rangeview High School in Aurora, Colorado, coaching running backs. The following year, White moved up to the collegiate level as offensive coordinator and wide receivers coach at Oregon Tech, a Division II school. At Oregon Tech, White implemented a record-setting run and shoot offense and helped Oregon Tech make the semifinal round of the 1988 playoffs.

In 1989, White became offensive coordinator and receivers coach at Division I-AA (now Division I FCS) UT Martin under Don McLeary. From 1990 to 1992, White had the same positions at Division I-A (now Division I FBS) Pacific under Walt Harris.

After coaching receivers at SMU under Tom Rossley in 1993, White coached receivers at Maryland in 1994 under Mark Duffner before another stint as SMU receivers coach from 1995 to 1996 again under Rossley.

Reuniting with Harris, White was running backs coach at Pittsburgh from 1997 to 1999. At Pittsburgh, White coached future NFL player Kevan Barlow and helped Pittsburgh qualify for the 1997 Liberty Bowl.

In 2000, White was running backs coach at Arizona State under Bruce Snyder. From 2001 to 2002, White coached running backs at Utah under Ron McBride and was part of Utah's 2001 Las Vegas Bowl title.

On December 19, 2002, Saint Mary's College hired White as head football coach. Saint Mary's went 1–11 in White's lone season in 2003, before Saint Mary's disbanded its football program in March 2004. White said that he felt "misled" and "betrayed" by Saint Mary's.

In 2005, White coached tight ends and running backs at Delaware State under Al Lavan and helped Delaware State finish 7–4 and with its first winning season since 2000.

From 2006 to 2010, White served as assistant head coach, offensive coordinator, and quarterbacks coach at Southeast Missouri State under Tony Samuel.

On January 4, 2011, White returned to the FBS level as running backs coach at New Mexico under Mike Locksley.

In 2012, White was assistant head coach and wide receivers coach at Fordham under Joe Moorhead.

White returned to the Division II level in 2013 as offensive coordinator at Lincoln University in Missouri.

In March 2016, White returned to Delaware State as associate head coach and running backs coach under Kenny Carter; he became offensive coordinator effective in the 2017 season.

In 2018, White was hired as the head football coach for Mullen High School. He resigned after only one year.

== Head coaching record ==
=== College ===
Year	Team	Overall	Conference	Standing	Bowl/playoffs
Saint Mary's Gaels (NCAA Division I-AA independent) (2003)
2003	Saint Mary's	1–11			
Saint Mary's:		1–11			
Total:		1–11			

=== High school ===
Year	Team	Overall	Conference	Standing	Bowl/playoffs
Mullen Mustangs () (2018)
2018	Mullen	4–7	1–4	5th	
Mullen:		4–7			
Total:		4–7			
