= Pat Ogrin =

American football player (born 1958)

No. 79, 75
- Position: Defensive tackle

Personal information
- Born: February 10, 1958 (age 68); Butte, Montana, U.S.
- Listed height: 6 ft 5 in (1.96 m)
- Listed weight: 265 lb (120 kg)

Career information
- High school: Butte
- College: Wyoming
- NFL draft: 1980: undrafted

Career history
- Washington Redskins (1980–1982); Denver Gold (1983); Pittsburgh Gladiators (1988)

Awards and highlights
- Super Bowl champion (XVII)

Career NFL statistics
- Games played: 8
- Stats at Pro Football Reference

Patrick John Ogrin (born February 10, 1958) is an American former professional football player who was a defensive tackle in the National Football League (NFL) for the Washington Redskins. He also played for the now-defunct United States Football League (USFL) Denver Gold in 1983. He played college football for the Wyoming Cowboys.

Ogrin was signed by the Redskins as an undrafted free agent out of the University of Wyoming in 1980. He spent the 1980 season on the injured reserve list with a knee injury. He was added to the active roster in November 1981 after the Redskins released Wilbur Young.
