= Elmer Bailey =

American football player (born 1957)

No. 88, 87, 83
- Position: Wide receiver

Personal information
- Born: December 13, 1957 (age 68); Evanston, Illinois, U.S.
- Listed height: 6 ft 0 in (1.83 m)
- Listed weight: 196 lb (89 kg)

Career information
- High school: Mechanic Arts (Saint Paul, Minnesota)
- College: Minnesota
- NFL draft: 1980: 4th round, 100th overall pick

Career history
- Miami Dolphins (1980–1981); Baltimore Colts (1982); Denver Gold (1984)

Awards and highlights
- First-team All-Big Ten (1979)

Career NFL statistics
- Receptions: 4
- Receiving yards: 105
- Stats at Pro Football Reference

Elmer Francis Bailey (born December 13, 1957) is an American former professional football player who spent three seasons in the National Football League (NFL) with the Miami Dolphins and Baltimore Colts between 1980 and 1982. Bailey appeared in 31 career games after being drafted in the fourth round from the University of Minnesota, he also attended Lincoln (MO) before transferring to Minnesota.
