= Leonard Harris (American football) =

American football player (born 1960)

Profile
- Positions: Wide receiver, kick returner

Personal information
- Born: November 27, 1960 (age 65); McKinney, Texas, U.S.

Career information
- College: Texas Tech
- NFL draft: 1983: undrafted

Career history
- 1984-1985: Denver Gold
- 1986: Tampa Bay Buccaneers
- 1987: Washington Redskins*
- 1987–1993: Houston Oilers
- 1994: Atlanta Falcons
- * Offseason or practice squad member only
- Stats at Pro Football Reference

Leonard Harris (born November 27, 1960) is a former National Football League wide receiver. He played for the Houston Oilers (1987–1993) and Atlanta Falcons (1994). He also played for the Denver Gold of the United States Football League.
