= Robert Kimmel =

American materials scientist and academic

Robert "Bob" Kimmel is an American materials scientist and academic in the field of packaging and labeling and packaging engineering.

== Career ==
His doctorate is from MIT with a focus on polymer science, after which he worked in the packaging industry for thirty years. He is currently Chair of the Department of Packaging Science at Clemson University, and the director of its Center for Flexible Packaging. His research focuses on the design of novel polymer chemicals. He also works on design, patent, and trademark issues related to the packaging and plastics industries. He is listed in Marquis' Who's Who Online.

Kimmel is a named inventor on ten US and international patents, including, "Co-processable multi-layer laminates for forming high strength, haze-free transparent articles and methods of producing same" and "Multilayer laminate formed from a substantially stretched non-molten wholly aromatic liquid crystalline polymer and non-polyester thermoplastic polymer.” He is also the author and co-author of dozens publications in the field of polymer chemistry and packaging. See, for example: “Antimicrobial Packaging for Food” and “New Approach for characterization of biopolymer film using proton behavior determined by low field 1H NMR.”
