= Kimel =

Kimel may refer to:

== People ==
- Sol Kimel (1928–2021), Israeli chemical physicist
- J. Daniel Kimel, plaintiff of Kimel v. Florida Board of Regents on discrimination
- Chaim Kimel (died 2006), murder victim profiled on Deadly Women; see List of Deadly Women episodes
- Kerstin Kimel, a lacrosse coach with some of the most wins; see List of college women's lacrosse career coaching wins leaders

== Other uses ==
- Kimel Industries, North Carolina gunmaker, maker of the Kimel AP-9 pistol
- Kimel v. Florida Board of Regents, U.S. Supreme Court case on discrimination

== See also ==
- Kimmel (disambiguation)
- Kimmell
