= Bruce Thornton (defensive lineman) =

American football player (born 1958)

No. 77, 79
- Position: Defensive end

Personal information
- Born: February 14, 1958 (age 68); Detroit, Michigan, U.S.
- Listed height: 6 ft 5 in (1.96 m)
- Listed weight: 263 lb (119 kg)

Career information
- High school: Chadsey (Detroit)
- College: Illinois
- NFL draft: 1979: 8th round, 219th overall pick

Career history
- Dallas Cowboys (1979–1981); St. Louis Cardinals (1982–1983); Chicago Blitz (1984)*; Denver Gold (1984–1985)
- * Offseason or practice squad member only

Awards and highlights
- All-USFL (1985)

Career NFL statistics
- Sacks: 10.5
- Interceptions: 1
- Stats at Pro Football Reference

Bruce Edward Thornton (born February 14, 1958) is an American former professional football player who was a defensive lineman in the National Football League (NFL) for the Dallas Cowboys and St. Louis Cardinals. He was also a member of the Denver Gold of the United States Football League (USFL). He played college football for the Illinois Fighting Illini.

== Early life ==
Thornton attended Chadsey High School. Besides playing defensive tackle, he was also an accomplished saxophonist and received music scholarships offers.

He accepted a football scholarship from the University of Illinois Urbana-Champaign. As a junior, he was a starter at defensive tackle and led the Big Ten Conference in sacks with 10. In his final year, he was moved to a backup role behind John Thiede, on a team that finished with a record of 1–8–2. He finished his college career with 32 sacks, placing him at the time fifth in school's history.

== Professional career ==
=== Dallas Cowboys ===
Thornton was selected by the Dallas Cowboys in the eighth round (219th overall) of the 1979 NFL draft, after dropping because of his diminished production as a college senior. As a rookie, he helped to compensate the loss of Ed "Too Tall" Jones to his boxing retirement, by coming on passing downs in place of Larry Cole at left defensive end and unofficially finishing second on the team with 6 sacks. His best game came against the Chicago Bears when he registered 2 sacks, one pass defensed and a blocked extra point.

In 1980, the return of Jones reduced his playing time, unofficially posting 3 sacks, including one against Vince Ferragamo in the NFC Wild Card Game. He would remain as a pass-rush specialist during the rest of his career with the Cowboys.

Thornton was waived on August 31, 1981, before being re-signed after Don Smerek injured a knee in the second game of the season and was placed on the injured reserve list. He was cut on September 6, 1982.

=== St. Louis Cardinals ===
On September 7, 1982, he was claimed off waivers by the St. Louis Cardinals. He was placed on the injured reserve list on August 30, 1983, before being released on October 4.

=== Chicago Blitz ===
On November 22, 1983, he was signed by the Chicago Blitz of the United States Football League. On March 28, 1984, he was traded to the Denver Gold in exchange for linebacker Bob Knapton and an undisclosed 1985 draft choice.

=== Denver Gold ===
In 1985, he led the Denver Gold in sacks with 12.5 (third in the league) and received All-League honors.

== Personal life ==
His son Kalen Thornton also played for the Dallas Cowboys.
