= Jon Kimmel =

American football player (born 1960)

No. 54, 50
- Position: Linebacker

Personal information
- Born: July 21, 1960 (age 66); Binghamton, New York, U.S.
- Listed height: 6 ft 4 in (1.93 m)
- Listed weight: 240 lb (109 kg)

Career information
- High school: Susquehanna Valley (Conklin, New York)
- College: Colgate
- NFL draft: 1983: undrafted

Career history
- Arizona Wranglers (1983); Chicago Blitz (1984); Denver Gold (1984); Philadelphia Eagles (1985); Washington Redskins (1987)

Career NFL statistics
- Games played: 5
- Games started: 1
- Stats at Pro Football Reference

Jon Joseph Kimmel (born July 21, 1960) is an American former professional football player who was a linebacker in the National Football League (NFL). He played college football for the Colgate Raiders. He played four games in the NFL for the Philadelphia Eagles in 1985 and one game for the Washington Redskins in 1987. Kimmel also played in the United States Football League (USFL) with the Arizona Wranglers in 1983 and the Chicago Blitz and Denver Gold in 1984.

In 2018, Kimmel was awarded a Super Bowl ring for playing for the Redskins in 1987, the year they won Super Bowl XXII.
