= Bill Johnson (running back) =

American football player (born 1960)

Profile
- Position: Running back

Personal information
- Born: October 31, 1960 (age 66); Poughkeepsie, New York, U.S.

Career information
- College: Arkansas State
- Supplemental draft: 1984: 2nd round, 38th overall pick

Career history
- Denver Gold (1984–1985); Cincinnati Bengals (1985–1987)

Career NFL statistics
- Rushing yards: 475
- Average: 5.5
- Touchdowns: 1
- Stats at Pro Football Reference

William Thomas Johnson (born October 31, 1960) is an American former professional football player from 1984 to 1987 in both the United States Football League (USFL) and the National Football League (NFL).

Primarily a running back, Johnson played college football for the Arkansas State Red Wolves, lettering in 1979, 1980 and 1982. Following his collegiate career, he was selected by the Denver Gold in the 17th round in the 1984 USFL draft.

Johnson played two years with the Gold. In his first season, he rushed the ball 36 times for 126 yards and two touchdowns (and another touchdown receiving). In the Gold's final season, he finished 1985 as the 3rd highest rusher in the league with 1261 yards and 15 touchdowns. He also caught 29 passes for 337 yards and another touchdown.

Johnson was selected by the NFL's Cincinnati Bengals in the second round (38th pick) of the 1984 NFL supplemental draft of USFL and CFL players. After the USFL folded, Johnson joined the Bengals, where he played from 1985 to 1987. During his NFL career, he amassed 475 yards on 85 carries and scored one touchdown.
