= Kurt E. Kimmel =

Swiss banker and philatelist (born 1941)

Kurt E. Kimmel FRPSL RDP (born 17 March 1941) is a Swiss banker and philatelist who signed the Roll of Distinguished Philatelists in 2004. He is a member of the FIP's Postal History Commission Bureau.

== Selected publications ==
- Ceylon: The Pence issues. Royal Philatelic Society London, London, 2020. (With Patrick Pearson)
