= Barstow High School =

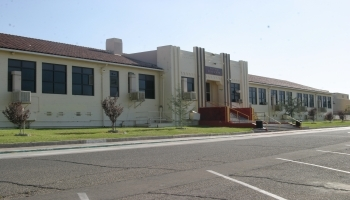

Location
- 430 South First Street; Barstow, California 92311; United States; 34°53′37″N 117°01′46″W

Information
- Type: Public
- Established: September 15, 1915
- School district: Barstow Unified School District
- Principal: Rafael Navarro
- Teaching staff: 65.37 (on FTE basis)
- Grades: 9 to 12
- Enrollment: 1,558 (2024-2025)
- Student to teacher ratio: 23.83
- Colors: Cardinal Red and Vult
- Athletics conference: Desert Sky League
- Mascot: Aztec
- Team name: Aztecs
- Website: https://bhs.busdk12.com/

Barstow High School is a public high school located in Barstow, California. The school serves about 1,400 students in grades 9 to 12 from across the city and in outlying areas.

== History ==
Founded in 1915, the school soon expanded and relocated to its current location in 1938.

In the early 2000s, funding from the city allowed the school to expand greatly, including revamping of older buildings, as well as the construction of a science lab and a gym.

== Athletics ==
The school is known for having D3-State-winning cross country teams, baseball program, award-winning competition cheer squad and the Aztec Marching Band. In Track & Field DSL Championships held on April 30, 2008, Anthony Solis broke the DSL record for the 3200m in 9:37 and later went on to run 9:11 at the 2008 California State Championships for 3200m, after winning CIF-SS D3 3200m individual title. Barstow High School had the Individual Champion in cross country at the Southern Section Finals with Anthony Solis winning in 2007 with a time of 15:01 and Isaac Chavez winning in 2008 with a time of 15:04 (both on the Mt.Sac cross country course).

As of the 2008–2009 school year, the school competes in basketball, football (1969 CIF State Champions), baseball, softball, soccer, girls' volleyball, track and field, cross country (six-time state champions), wrestling, golf, tennis and cheerleading (co-ed).

The 1969 Barstow Riffian football team was undefeated in both pre-season and regular season play. This team won the Golden League Football Conference, entered seventh place in the playoffs where they then continued their undefeated streak beating in the first round fourth place undefeated Ontario 30–6 and then beat in the second round second-placed Santa Paula 45–14. They came from behind in the final playoff game to defeat undefeated Los Alamitos 33–14 and win the CIF AA Southern Section Championship on their home field, before a sold-out crowd of 11,000 fans. This team is the only football team in the school history to win a CIF-SS Championship. It was also the first school in football to go undefeated in a season in the history of San Bernardino County and held this undefeated record for another 20 years.

Since 1932, the Barstow High School Aztecs have played the Victor Valley High School Jackrabbits in the Axe Game. It is the second-oldest high school rivalry in southern California.

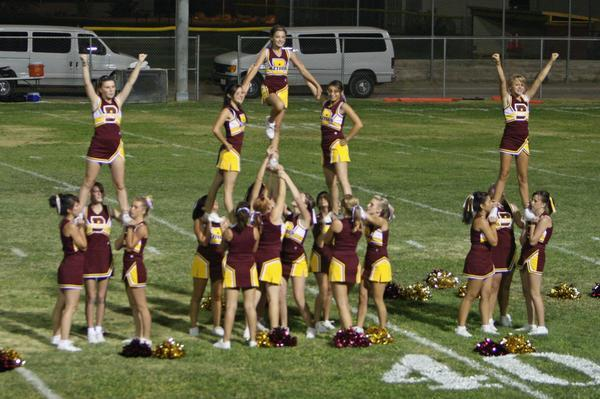
Barstow High Aztec cheerleaders at a football game.

=== Mascot ===
Originally the Bulldogs, "Riffian" became the mascot following popularity of the movie, The Desert Song (1943).

When the school merged with Barstow's John F. Kennedy High School on the campus of Barstow High in 1977, the mascot was officially changed to the Aztecs and the school colors to cardinal and gold.

== Student demographics ==
As of 2008:

- American Indian are 2% of BHS student population, compared to 1% of statewide average
- Asian are 4% of BHS student population, compared to 11% of statewide average
- African American are 18% of BHS student population, compared to 7% of statewide average
- White are 35% of BHS student population, compared to 33% of statewide average
- Hispanic are 41% of BHS student population, compared to 45% of statewide average

== Notable alumni ==
- Grant Feasel, former NFL center
- TJ Houshmandzadeh, former NFL wide receiver
- Robert E. Petersen, magazine publisher
- Aaron Sanchez, professional baseball player (Toronto Blue Jays, Houston Astros, Minnesota Twins, San Francisco Giants, Washington Nationals)
