= Kimmel =

Kimmel can refer to:

== People ==
- Kimmel (surname)

== Places ==
- Kimmel Township, Pennsylvania, USA
- Kimmel Center for the Performing Arts, Philadelphia, PA, USA
- Sidney Kimmel Medical College, Thomas Jefferson University, Philadelphia, Pennsylvania, USA
- Sidney Kimmel Comprehensive Cancer Center, Johns Hopkins University, Baltimore, Maryland, USA
- Kimmel Arena, University of North Carolina at Asheville, Asheville, North Carolina, USA
- Kimmel, Algeria

== Foods ==
- Kimmel bread, rye bread with caraway seeds
- Kümmel (liqueur) or kimmel, a sweet, colorless liqueur

== Other ==
- Kimmel Eshkolot Architects, Israeli architecture firm
- USS Charles J. Kimmel (DE-584), U.S. Navy destroyer escort

== See also ==
- Jimmy Kimmel Live! (2003–2025), known as "Kimmel", U.S. TV late night talk show
- Claysburg-Kimmel School District, Pennsylvania, USA
- Kimmell (disambiguation)
- Kimel (disambiguation)
