= Fred Mortensen =

American football player (born 1954)

No. 14
- Position: Quarterback

Personal information
- Born: March 24, 1954 (age 72); Safford, Arizona
- Listed height: 6 ft 1 in (1.85 m)
- Listed weight: 193 lb (88 kg)

Career information
- High school: Tempe (AZ)
- College: Arizona State
- NFL draft: 1978: undrafted

Career history
- Denver Broncos (1978-1979)*; Washington Redskins (1979)*; Denver Gold (1983–1984); San Antonio Gunslingers (1985)
- * Offseason or practice squad member only

Fred Mortensen (born March 24, 1954) was a former college football player at Arizona State University.

Fred played three years in the United States Football League, playing quarterback for the Denver Gold in 1983 and 1984 and the San Antonio Gunslingers in 1985.

In the 1990s Fred also served as a high school Football coach for the Tempe High School Buffalo Varsity football team where his sons Todd and Nathan attended. Fred quarterbacked Tempe High School to the state finals in 1971. In the 1975 Fiesta Bowl, Fred helped lead the Sun Devils to a 17-14 victory over Nebraska. Today Mortensen lives in Tempe where he acts as a member, and former Bishop, of The Church of Jesus Christ of Latter-day Saints, and runs a general contracting business.
