= Jamie Kimmel =

American football player (born 1962)

No. 59
- Position: Linebacker

Personal information
- Born: March 28, 1962 (age 64); Johnson City, New York, U.S.
- Listed height: 6 ft 3 in (1.91 m)
- Listed weight: 235 lb (107 kg)

Career information
- High school: Conklin (NY) Susquehanna Valley
- College: Syracuse
- NFL draft: 1985: 4th round, 107th overall pick

Career history
- Los Angeles Raiders (1986–1988); Seattle Seahawks (1990)*
- * Offseason or practice squad member only

Awards and highlights
- First-team All-East (1984)

Career NFL statistics
- Fumble recoveries: 1
- Stats at Pro Football Reference

Jamie Kimmel (born March 28, 1962) is an American former professional football player who was a linebacker for the Los Angeles Raiders of the National Football League (NFL) from 1986 to 1987. He played college football for the Syracuse Orange and was selected by the Raiders in the fourth round of the 1985 NFL draft.
