= Kimmell Park =

- U.S. National Register of Historic Places
- U.S. Historic district
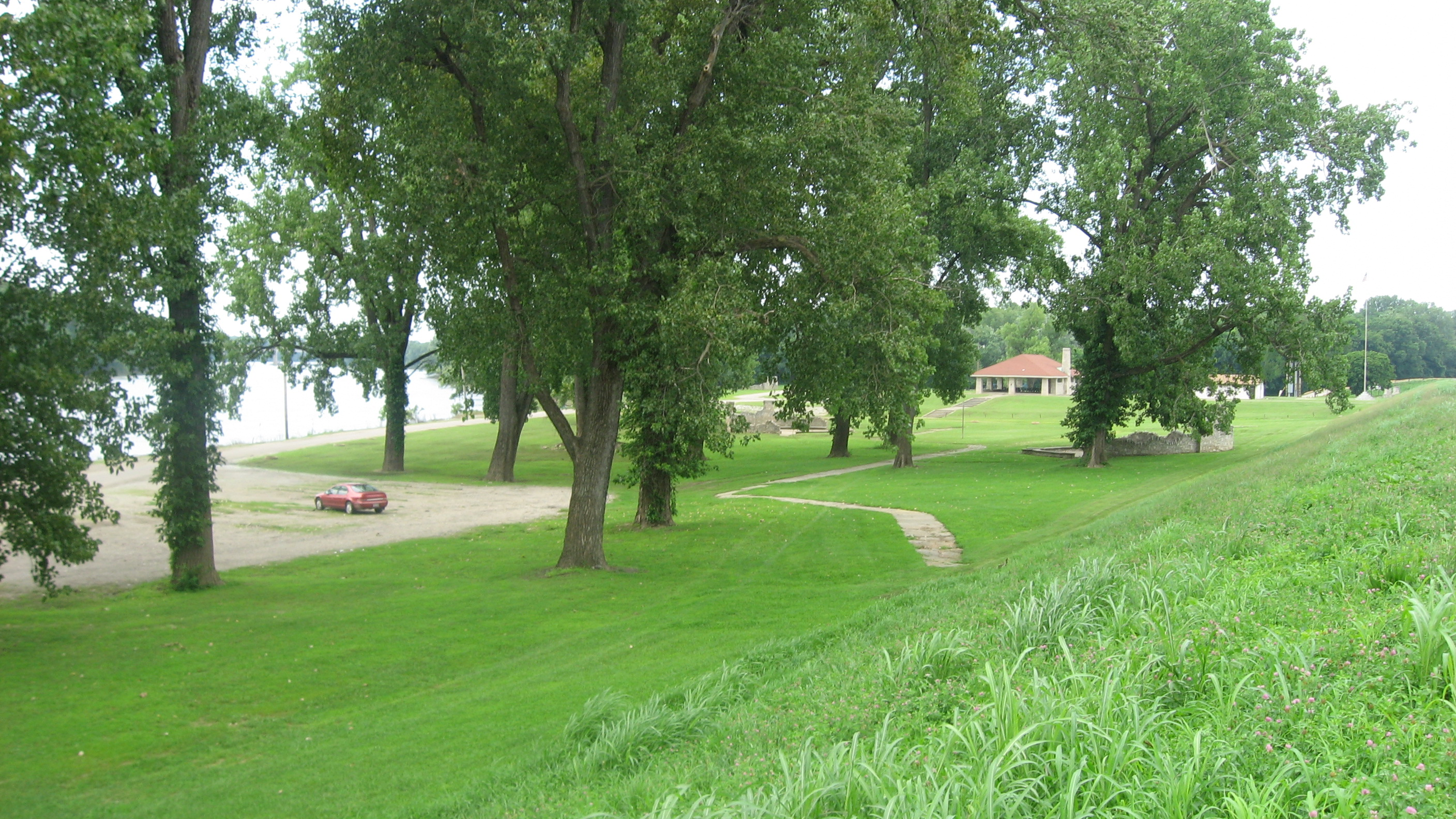
- Kimmell Park, July 2013

- Location within Indiana Location within the United States
- Location: 2014 Oliphant Dr., Vincennes, Indiana
- Coordinates: 38°41′48″N 87°31′04″W
- Area: 22 acres (8.9 ha)
- Built: 1938
- Architect: Sutton, Byron, and Routt, Lester W.
- Architectural style: Park Rustic
- NRHP reference No.: 13000757
- Added to NRHP: September 25, 2013

Kimmell Park is a historic public park and national historic district located on the Wabash River at Vincennes, Indiana. The park was dedicated in 1938, and developed by the Works Progress Administration (WPA). The WPA constructed a limestone shelterhouse and circular picnic patios with seating and built-in fireplace ovens. The park is named for Vincennes mayor Joseph Kimmell (1887–1970) and is a popular spot for picnicking, fishing, and contemplation of the river.

It was added to the National Register of Historic Places in 2013.

With the goal of revitalizing the park and capitalizing on the riverfront, the City of Vincennes, Vincennes Parks Board, and Vincennes University worked cooperatively in 2015, with all parties agreeing to transfer ownership of the 8.5-acre Kimmell Park and its 54-acre woodlands to VU, with covenants to ensure that the property remains a public park. The renovations, costing nearly $3 million, kept the unique, historic features built by the W.P.A. while installing walking paths, 70 new lights, 200 new trees, 850 linear feet of guard rails, 4,000 cubic yards of fresh concrete, new bathrooms, a new boat ramp, regular security patrols, and a widened entrance that offers a more panoramic view of the river. The name of the park remains the same, honoring former Vincennes Mayor Joseph W. Kimmell, who attended Vincennes University and served on their Board of Trustees for many years. The Kimmell Park Community Playground, funded by community effort and a state grant, opened in September 2019.
