= Grant Feasel =

American football player (1960–2012)

No. 50, 64, 54
- Position: Center

Personal information
- Born: June 28, 1960; Barstow, California. U.S.
- Died: July 15, 2012 (aged 52); Fort Worth, Texas, U.S.
- Listed height: 6 ft 7 in (2.01 m)
- Listed weight: 278 lb (126 kg)

Career information
- High school: Barstow (CA)
- College: Abilene Christian
- NFL draft: 1983: 6th round, 161st overall pick

Career history
- Baltimore/Indianapolis Colts (1983–1984); Minnesota Vikings (1984-1986); Seattle Seahawks (1987–1993)

Career NFL statistics
- Games played: 117
- Games started: 54
- Fumble recoveries: 7
- Stats at Pro Football Reference

Grant Earl Feasel (June 28, 1960 – July 15, 2012) was an American professional football center in the National Football League (NFL) for the Baltimore/Indianapolis Colts, Minnesota Vikings, and Seattle Seahawks.

== Early life ==
Born and raised in Barstow, California, Feasel graduated from Barstow High School in 1978, then was a standout football player and a first-team All-America center at Abilene Christian University in Abilene, Texas. In 1997, he was named to the NCAA Division II Team of the Quarter Century.

== Professional career ==
Feasel was selected in the sixth round of the 1983 NFL draft by the Baltimore Colts. He played in the 1983 season in Baltimore, then the franchise relocated to Indianapolis. He played part of the 1984 season, then was traded mid-season to the Minnesota Vikings.

He played two years for the Vikings, then was traded to the Seattle Seahawks in 1987, where he played six of his ten years in the NFL.

== Personal life ==
Feasel married Cyndy and they had three children: sons Sean and Spencer, and daughter Sarah. His older brother Greg (b.1958) also played at Abilene Christian and in the NFL and is also the president of the Colorado Rockies of the MLB.

== After football ==
Feasel died at age 52 in 2012 in Fort Worth, Texas. His family donated his brain to the Concussion Legacy Foundation. He was diagnosed posthumously with chronic traumatic encephalopathy (CTE), a degenerative brain disease. He was one of at least 345 NFL players to be diagnosed after death with this disease, which is caused by repeated hits to the head.

== See also ==
- List of NFL players with chronic traumatic encephalopathy
