= Susquehanna Valley High School =

High school in New York, United States

Location
- 1040 Conklin Rd. Conklin, NY 13748
- Coordinates: 42.0766°N 75.823°W

Information
- Type: Public School
- Principal: Sydelle Steward
- Staff: 40.26 (FTE)
- Grades: 9-12
- Enrollment: 420 (2022-2023)
- Student to teacher ratio: 10.43
- Campus type: Rural-urban fringe
- Colors: Navy and Gold
- Website: School Website

Susquehanna Valley High School is a public high school located in Conklin, New York. It is part of the Susquehanna Valley Central School District, which encompasses residents of the municipalities of Binghamton, Conklin, Kirkwood, and parts of Windsor and Vestal.

== Athletics ==
The school colors are navy and gold. The athletic teams are known as the Sabers, which share a logo with the Kansas State Wildcats.

== Academics ==
SVHS offers many college-level courses through SUNY Broome Community College and Tompkins Cortland Community College. They also offer Advanced Placement courses such as AP Calculus AB and AP Biology.

== Demographics and statistics ==
New York State's data for the 2020-2021 school year notes Susquehanna Valley Districts enrollment was 1,407 for grades K-12. For the highschool, grades 9, 10, 11, and 12 had a combined enrollment of 404 students of which 357 were white (88%), 20 Hispanic or Latino (5%), 13 multiracial (3%), 11 Black or African American (3%), and 3 Asian, Native Hawaiian, or other Pacific Islander (1%). The student/teacher ratio is 11.38

The state's School Safety and Educational Climate Incidents reporting for 2020-2021 noted an enrollment of 405 at the high school, reporting 1 sex offence, 2 assaults causing physical injury, 1 incident of weapons possession, and 1 incident of non-cyber harassment and bullying.

== Notable alumni ==
- Jamie Kimmel, former American football linebacker
- Payton Gendron, mass shooter of a Tops Friendly Markets
