= 1985 USFL season =

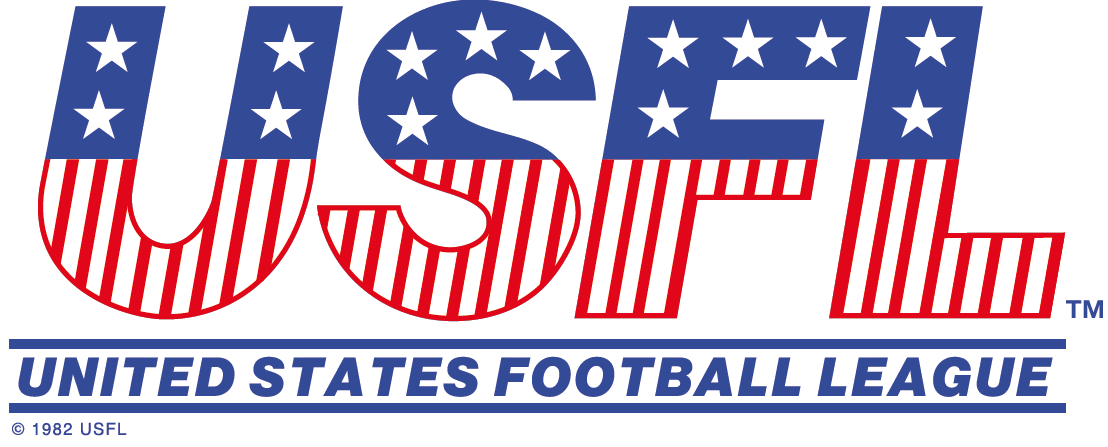
- Duration: February 23 – June 24, 1985
- Eastern Conference champions (regular season) champions: Birmingham Stallions
- Western Conference champions (regular season) champions: Oakland Invaders
- Date: July 14, 1985
- Finals venue: Giants Stadium, East Rutherford, N.J.
- Finals champions: Baltimore Stars

Seasons
- 1984 1986 (cancelled)

USFL teams: Western, Eastern

The 1985 USFL season was the third and final season of the United States Football League (USFL), and the last by a league using that name until the 2022 USFL season.

== Rule changes ==
Adopted instant replay for the 1985 season. Under the instant-replay rule, a team may have one appeal per half in three situations:

- A fumble or no-fumble situation.
- Whether a pass is complete, incomplete or intercepted.
- Whether the ball has penetrated the goal line.

The team asking for the replay would lose a time out if they were wrong. The replay was available only in games televised by ABC.

== Franchise changes ==
- Pittsburgh Maulers fold.
- Chicago Blitz suspend operations.
- Michigan Panthers merge with the Oakland Invaders.
- Arizona Wranglers and the Oklahoma Outlaws merge and create the Arizona Outlaws.
- New Orleans Breakers relocate to Portland, Oregon as the Portland Breakers.
- Philadelphia Stars move games to College Park, Maryland, with plans to move to Baltimore in 1986, team is renamed the Baltimore Stars.
- Washington Federals are sold and relocate to Orlando, Florida, as the Orlando Renegades.

== General news ==
August 22, 1984, the owners voted to move to a fall schedule starting in 1986.

Harry Usher became the new commissioner of the USFL in January 1985.

The USFL and the United States Football League Players Association (USFLPA) agreed on a four-year agreement in March 1985.

On April 29, 1985, the league's owners voted 13–2 to reaffirm their decision to begin playing a fall season in 1986.

== Regular season ==
W = Wins, L = Losses, T = Ties, PCT= Winning Percentage, PF= Points For, PA = Points Against

y = Division Champion, x = Wild Card

Eastern Conference
Team	W	L	T	PCT	PF	PA	Stadium	1985 Capacity	Avg. Att.	Avg. % Filled	Coach
y-Birmingham Stallions	13	5	0	.722	436	299	Legion Field	77,000	32,065	42%	Rollie Dotsch
x-New Jersey Generals	11	7	0	.611	418	378	Giants Stadium	76,891	41,268	54%	Walt Michaels
x-Memphis Showboats	11	7	0	.611	429	337	Liberty Bowl Memorial Stadium	50,180	30,948	62%	Pepper Rodgers
x-Baltimore Stars	10	7	1	.583	368	260	Byrd Stadium	51,500	14,275	28%	Jim Mora
x-Tampa Bay Bandits	10	8	0	.556	405	422	Tampa Stadium	72,812	45,220	62%	Steve Spurrier
Jacksonville Bulls	9	9	0	.500	407	402	Gator Bowl Stadium	80,100	44,325	55%	Lindy Infante
Orlando Renegades	5	13	0	.278	308	481	Orlando Stadium	52,000	24,136	46%	Lee Corso

Western Conference
Team	W	L	T	PCT	PF	PA	Stadium	1985 Capacity	Avg. Att.	Avg. % Filled	Coach
y-Oakland Invaders	13	4	1	.750	473	359	Oakland–Alameda County Coliseum	54,615	17,509	32%	Charlie Sumner
x-Denver Gold	11	7	0	.611	433	389	Mile High Stadium	75,123	14,446	19%	Darrell "Mouse" Davis
x-Houston Gamblers	10	8	0	.556	544	388	Houston Astrodome	47,695	19,120	40%	Jack Pardee
Arizona Outlaws	8	10	0	.444	376	405	Sun Devil Stadium	70,030	17,881	26%	Frank Kush
Portland Breakers	6	12	0	.333	275	422	Civic Stadium	32,500	19,919	61%	Dick Coury
San Antonio Gunslingers	5	13	0	.278	296	436	Alamo Stadium	32,000	11,721	37%	Jim Bates/Gil Steinke
Los Angeles Express	3	15	0	.167	266	456	Los Angeles Memorial Coliseum	94,000	8,415	9%	John Hadl

New Jersey finished ahead of Memphis based on a head-to-head tiebreaker advantage (2–0).

== Playoffs ==
Away team	Score	Home team	Date
Quarterfinals
Houston Gamblers	20–22	Birmingham Stallions	June 29, 1985
Denver Gold	7–48	Memphis Showboats	June 29, 1985
Tampa Bay Bandits	27–30	Oakland Invaders	June 30, 1985
Baltimore Stars	20–17	New Jersey Generals	July 1, 1985
Semifinals
Baltimore Stars	28–14	Birmingham Stallions	July 6, 1985
Oakland Invaders	28–19	Memphis Showboats	July 7, 1985
USFL Championship Game Giants Stadium, East Rutherford, New Jersey
Baltimore Stars	28–24	Oakland Invaders	July 14, 1985

Quarterfinals
W3	Houston	20
E1	Birmingham	22
E4	Baltimore	20
E2	New Jersey	17
E5	Tampa Bay	27
W1	Oakland	30
W2	Denver	7
E3	Memphis	48

Semifinals
E1	Birmingham	14
E4	Baltimore	28
W1	Oakland	28
E3	Memphis	19

USFL Championship
E4	Baltimore	28
W1	Oakland	24

== Statistics ==
=== 1985 regular season stat leaders ===
1985 Passing Stats (all)
Name, Team	Att	Comp	%	yards	YDs/Att	TD	TD %	INT	INT %	Rating
Walter Lewis, MEM	184	97	52.7	1593	8.66	16	8.7	5	2.7	99.8
Jim Kelly, HOU	567	360	63.5	4623	8.15	39	6.9	19	3.4	97.9
Fred Besana, OAK	58	34	58.6	494	8.51	6	10.3	4	6.9	92.2
Brian Sipe, JACK	89	55	61.8	685	7.97	4	4.5	2	2.2	91.3
Cliff Stoudt, BIRM	444	266	59.9	3358	7.56	34	7.7	19	4.3	91.2
Tim Riordan, BAL	36	21	58.3	260	7.22	1	2.8	0	0.0	90.0
Bobby Hebert, OAK	456	244	53.5	3811	8.36	30	6.6	19	4.2	86.1
Chuck Fusina, BAL	496	303	61.1	3496	7.05	20	4.0	14	2.8	84.0
Mike Kelley, MEM	260	165	63.5	2186	8.41	9	3.5	14	5.4	79.1
Bob Lane, BIRM	33	18	54.5	255	7.73	1	3.0	1	3.0	77.2
Doug Williams, ARZ	509	271	53.2	3673	7.22	21	4.1	17	3.3	76.4
Bob Gagliano, DENV	358	205	57.3	2695	7.53	13	3.6	17	4.7	73.5
John Reaves, TB	561	314	56.0	4193	7.47	25	4.5	29	5.2	73.2
Ed Luther, JACK	400	240	60.0	2792	6.98	15	3.8	21	5.3	71.8
Todd Dillon, HOU	225	121	53.8	1495	6.65	9	4.0	9	4.0	71.3
Rick Neuheisel, SA	421	239	56.8	3068	7.29	18	4.3	25	5.9	69.3
Doug Flutie, NJ	281	134	47.7	2109	7.51	13	4.6	14	5.0	67.8
Rick Johnson, ARZ	43	21	48.8	318	7.40	3	7.0	3	7.0	67.8
Reggie Collier, ORL	427	229	53.6	2578	6.04	13	3.0	16	3.7	66.5
Vince Evans, DENV	325	157	48.3	2259	6.95	12	3.7	16	4.9	63.1
Steve Young, LA	250	137	54.8	1741	6.97	6	2.4	13	5.2	63.1
Matt Robinson, POR	310	156	50.3	2182	7.04	15	4.8	20	6.5	62.6
Buck Belue, JACK	68	37	54.4	299	4.40	3	4.4	3	4.4	62.1
Jerry Golsteyn, ORL	135	65	48.1	647	4.79	4	3.0	7	5.2	50.4
Jimmy Jordan, TB	93	54	58.1	601	6.46	3	3.2	11	11.8	48.6
Doug Woodward, POR	155	62	40.0	831	5.36	3	1.9	6	3.9	48.1
Frank Seurer, LA	242	120	49.6	1479	6.11	7	2.9	18	7.4	47.5
Fred Mortensen, SA	57	20	35.1	204	3.58	1	1.8	4	7.0	22.8

1985 Rushing leaders
Name, Team	Att	Yds	Ave.	TDs
Herschel Walker, NJ	438	2411	5.5	21
Mike Rozier, JACK	320	1361	4.3	12
Bill Johnson, DENV	212	1261	5.9	15
Kelvin Bryant, BAL	238	1207	5.1	12
Gary Anderson, TB	276	1207	4.4	16
Joe Cribbs, BIRM	267	1047	3.9	7
Reggie Brown, AZ	229	1031	4.5	12
Albert Bentley, OAK	191	1020	5.3	4
John Williams, OAK	186	857	4.6	9
Buford Jordan, PORT	165	817	5.0	5
Tim Spencer, MEM	198	789	4.0	3
Curtis Bledsoe, ORL	207	781	3.8	3
Maurice Carthon, NJ	175	726	4.1	6
Reggie Collier, ORL	92	606	6.6	12
Walter Lewis, MEM	65	591	9.1	4
Greg Boone, TB	111	559	5.0	3
Allen Harvin, BAL	138	549	4.0	4
George Works, SA	93	542	5.8	1
Mel Gray, LA	125	526	4.2	1

1985 Receiving Leaders
Name, Team	Rec	Yds	Ave.	TDs
Richard Johnson, HOU	103	1384	13.4	14
Leonard Harris, DENV	101	1432	14.2	8
Jim Smith, BIRM	87	1322	15.2	20
Clarence Verdin, HOU	84	1004	12.0	9
Alton Alexis, JACK	83	1118	13.5	5
Marc Lewis, DENV	75	1207	16.1	6
Scott Fitzkee, BAL	73	882	12.1	3
Gary Anderson, TB	72	678	9.4	4
Derrick Crawford, MEM	70	1057	15.1	9
Anthony Carter, OAK	70	1323	18.9	14
Larry Brodsky, TB	69	1071	15.5	7
Gordon Banks, OAK	62	1115	18.0	5
Perry Kemp, JACK	59	915	15.5	4
Marvin Harvey, TB	59	723	12.3	3
Gerald McNeil, HOU	58	1017	17.5	6
Joey Walters, ORL	58	784	13.5	5
Greg Moser, MEM	57	1145	20.1	6
Vincent White, DENV	55	666	12.1	5
Alphonso Williams, AZ	55	1020	18.5	8
Mark Keel, JACK	53	585	11.0	0
Don Roberts, SA	53	653	12.3	4
Sam Harrell, HOU	51	491	9.6	2
Greg Anderson, AZ	51	915	17.9	5
Mike Rozier, JACK	50	366	7.3	3
JoJo Townsell, LA	47	777	16.5	6
Derek Holloway, OAK	47	824	17.5	7
Jerry Gordon, SA	44	693	15.8	7
Ken Dunek, BAL	44	508	11.5	0
Frank Lockett, PORT/SA	43	794	18.5	3
Joey Jones, BIRM	43	751	17.5	7
Jeff Smith, ORL	42	521	12.4	1
Dan Ross, PORT	41	522	12.7	5

=== 1985 USFL regular season sortable offensive team statistics ===
Team	Pts.	Ave.	Rank	Total Yards	Ave.	Rank	Rush. Yards	Ave.	Rank	Pass. Yards	Ave.	Rank
Houston	544	30.2	1	7032	391	1	1192	66	14	5840	324	1
Oakland	473	26.3	2	6354	353	4	2362	131	5	3992	222	4
Birmingham	436	24.2	3	5852	325	8	2463	137	3	3389	188	9
Denver	433	24.1	4	6629	368	3	2079	116	7	4550	253	3
Memphis	429	23.8	5	6201	345	5	2775	154	2	3426	190	8
New Jersey	418	23.2	6	6149	342	6	3763	209	1	2386	133	14
Jacksonville	407	22.6	7	5752	320	10	1998	111	11	3754	209	6
Tampa Bay	405	22.5	8	6709	373	2	2070	115	8	4639	258	2
Arizona	376	20.9	9	5804	322	9	2019	112	10	3785	210	5
Baltimore	368	20.4	10	5926	329	7	2420	134	4	3506	195	7
Orlando	308	17.1	11	4611	256	13	1818	101	12	2793	155	12
San Antonio	296	16.4	12	4597	255	14	1777	99	13	2820	157	11
Portland	275	15.3	13	5029	279	11	2041	113	9	2988	166	10
Los Angeles	266	14.8	14	4707	262	12	2087	116	6	2620	146	13

=== 1985 USFL regular season sortable defensive team statistics ===
Team	Pts.	Ave.	Rank	Total Yards	Ave.	Rank	Rush. Yards	Ave.	Rank	Pass. Yards	Ave.	Rank
Baltimore	260	14.4	1	5291	294	2	2045	114	6	3246	180	3
Birmingham	299	16.6	2	4829	268	1	1807	100	1	3022	168	1
Memphis	337	18.7	3	5327	296	3	1897	105	3	3430	191	5
Oakland	359	19.9	4	5584	310	5	1832	102	2	3752	208	10
New Jersey	378	21.0	5	5685	316	7	1959	109	5	3726	207	9
Houston	388	21.6	6	6298	350	13	2168	120	8	4130	229	13
Denver	389	21.6	7	5924	329	8	2172	121	9	3752	208	11
Jacksonville	402	22.3	8	6121	340	10	2559	142	13	3562	198	7
Arizona	405	22.5	9	5518	307	4	2291	127	10	3227	179	2
Tampa Bay	422	23.4	10	5949	331	9	2390	133	12	3559	198	6
Portland	422	23.4	11	6177	343	11	2344	130	11	3833	213	12
San Antonio	436	24.2	12	5645	314	6	1949	108	4	3696	205	8
Los Angeles	456	25.3	13	6273	349	12	2132	118	7	4141	230	14
Orlando	481	26.7	14	6731	374	14	3319	184	14	3412	190	4

== Awards ==
1985 USFL All-League Team

- WR Richard Johnson, HOU
- WR Jim Smith, BIRM
- TE Marvin Harvey, TB
- T Irv Eatman, BAL
- T Ray Pinney, OAKL
- G Buddy Aydelette, BIRM
- G Pat Saindon, BIRM
- C Kent Hull, NJ
- QB Jim Kelly, HOU
- HB Herschel Walker, NJ
- HB Gary Anderson, TB
- DE James Lockette, NJ
- DE Bruce Thornton, DENV
- DT Reggie White, MEM
- DT Dave Tipton, AZ
- LB Sam Mills, BAL
- LB Kiki DeAyala, HOU
- CB Kerry Justin, NJ
- CB David Martin, DENV/AZ
- S Chuck Clanton, BIRM
- S Mike Lush, BAL
- K Brian Franco, JACK
- KR Clarence Verdin, HOU
- P Stan Talley, OAKL
- PR Gerald McNeil, HOU
- MVP – HB Herschel Walker, NJ
- Coach of the year – Rollie Dotsch, BIRM
- Special Teams Player of the year – WR Clarence Verdin, HOU

Second Team

- WR Anthony Carter, OAKL
- WR Leonard Harris, DENV
- TE Dan Ross, PORT
- T Pat Phenix, BIRM
- T Dan Fike, TB
- G Alvin Powell, AZ
- G Chuck Commusky, BAL
- C Jim Leonard, OAKL
- QB Cliff Stoudt, BIRM
- RB Bill Johnson, DENV
- RB Mike Rozier, JACK
- DE Keith Millard, JACK
- DE Pete Catan, HOU
- LB Bill Roe, BIRM
- LB Herb Spencer, BIRM
- LB Ray Bentley, OAKL
- CB Vito McKeever, OAKL
- CB Jonathan Sutton, BAL
- S Luther Bradley, HOU
- S Vic Minor, SA
- K Toni Fritsch, HOU
- P Greg Carter, ORL
- KR Jerry Parish, ORL
- PR Thad McFadden, BIRM

1985 The Sporting News USFL All-Star Team

- WR Richard Johnson, HOU
- WR Jim Smith, BIRM
- WR Anthony Carter, OAKL
- TE Gordon Hudson, LA
- T Irv Eatman, BAL
- T Gary Zimmerman, LA
- G Buddy Aydelette, BIRM
- G Pat Saindon, BIRM
- C Kent Hull, NJ
- QB Jim Kelly, HOU
- HB Herschel Walker, NJ
- HB Gary Anderson, TB
- DE Reggie White, MEM
- DE William Fuller, BAL
- DT Jearld Baylis, PORT
- DT Doug Smith, BIRM
- OLB Herb Spencer, BIRM
- OLB Andy Hawkins, HOU
- ILB Sam Mills, BAL
- ILB John Nevens, DENV
- ILB Howard Carson, LA
- CB Jerry Holmes, NJ
- CB David Martin, DENV/AZ
- S Barney Bussey, MEM
- S Chuck Clanton, BIRM
- K Tony Zendejas, LA
- KR Clarence Verdin, HOU
- P Stan Talley, OAKL
- PR Gerald McNeil, HOU
- Player of the year—HB Herschel Walker, NJ
- Coach of the year -- Rollie Dotsch, BIRM
- Executive of the year -- Jerry Sklar, BIRM
