= Alvin White (American football) =

American gridiron football player (born 1953)

Profile
- Position: Quarterback/Punter

Personal information
- Born: March 26, 1953 (age 73); Ontario, California, U.S.
- Listed height: 6 ft 3 in (1.91 m)
- Listed weight: 219 lb (99 kg)

Career information
- High school: Newport Harbor (Newport Beach, California)
- College: Oregon State
- NFL draft: 1975: 15th round, 385th overall pick

Career history
- Los Angeles Rams (1975)*; Southern California Sun (1975); Los Angeles Rams (1976)*; New Orleans Saints (1976)*; Houston Oilers (1977)*; Toronto Argonauts (1978); Kentucky Trackers (1979); BC Lions (1980); Calgary Stampeders (1980); Denver Gold (1983); San Antonio Gunslingers (1984–1985)
- * Offseason or practice squad member only

Career CFL statistics
- Comp-Att: 65–136
- Passing yards: 936
- TD–INT: 3–13

Alvin White (born March 26, 1953) is an American former professional football player who was a quarterback and punter in the World Football League (WFL), Canadian Football League (CFL) and United States Football League (USFL). He played college football for the Oregon State Beavers.

== College career ==
White began his collegiate career at Orange Coast College before transferring to Oregon State. As a senior he finished second in the Pacific-8 Conference in total offense with 1,960 yards and was third with 1,662 passing yards while also averaging 36.3 yards per punt. White finished his collegiate career with 3,099 yards on 250-for-557 passing with ten touchdown passes and 36 interceptions while also rushing for 307 yards and eight touchdowns.

== Professional career ==
White earned the nickname "the Grasshopper" for moving from team to team during his career. He was selected by the Los Angeles Rams in the 15th round of the 1975 NFL Draft. He was cut during training camp and was signed by the Southern California Sun of the World Football League as a punter. He was re-signed by the Rams after the WFL season but was again cut early during training camp. White was claimed off of waivers by the New Orleans Saints on July 17, 1976. White was a member of the Houston Oilers during the preseason in 1977 but did not make the final roster.

White was signed by the Toronto Argonauts of the Canadian Football League (CFL) in 1978 and played in five games for the team, completing 65 of 136 pass attempts for 936 yards with three touchdown passes and 13 interceptions while also rushing for three touchdowns. He spent 1979 with the Kentucky Trackers of the minor league American Football Association. White returned to the CFL in 1980 and played with the Calgary Stampeders and the BC Lions. White was signed by the Denver Gold of the United States Football League for the 1983 season. He spent 1984 as a backup quarterback for the San Antonio Gunslingers and was hired by the team as an assistant facilities manager after being released in 1985.

== Personal life ==
White played bit parts is several football-themed movies “North Dallas Forty,” “Two-Minute Warning,” “Semi-Tough,” and “The Best of Times” and is a member of the Screen Actors Guild.
