= Joe Silipo =

American gridiron football player (born 1957)

No. 57, 64, 66, 67, 75
- Position: Center/Long snapper

Personal information
- Born: December 31, 1957 (age 68); Glen Cove, New York
- Listed height: 6 ft 4 in (1.93 m)
- Listed weight: 255 lb (116 kg)

Career information
- High school: East Setauket (NY) Ward Melville
- College: Tulane
- NFL draft: 1981: undrafted

Career history
- Montreal Alouettes (1981); Montreal Concordes (1982)*; Kansas City Chiefs (1982)*; Denver Gold (1983); San Antonio Gunslingers (1984–1985); Buffalo Bills (1987)
- * Offseason or practice squad member only

Career NFL statistics
- Games played: 1
- Stats at Pro Football Reference

Joseph Martin Silipo (born December 31, 1957, at Glen Cove, New York) was a Canadian and American football player in three professional football leagues.

An offensive lineman and a graduate of Tulane University, Silipo played two games with the Montreal Alouettes of the Canadian Football League in 1981. He then moved to the USFL, where he played with the Denver Gold in 1983 and the San Antonio Gunslingers in 1984 and 1985. In 1987, he was an NFL strike replacement player with the Buffalo Bills, playing in one game.

His son, Joe Silipo Jr., was a defensive lineman at the University of Northern Colorado and then transferred to the University of Colorado where he served as a long snapper for the Buffaloes.

== College career ==
Silipo played football at Tulane University and graduated with a degree in education.

== Professional career ==
=== Montreal Alouettes/Montreal Concordes ===
As a free agent, Silipo would sign with the Montreal Alouettes of the Canadian Football League on July 11, 1981. He was assigned jersey number 67 and played in two games during the Alouettes' 1981 season. The Alouettes franchise folded in May 1982 and the team re-emerged as the Montreal Concordes. Following a dismal 3–13-0 record in 1981, the Concordes immediately started a rebuilding process and several players were released, including Silipo on June 28, 1982.

=== Kansas City Chiefs ===
After being released by the Concordes, Silipo signed with the Kansas City Chiefs of the National Football League on July 10, 1982, and subsequently attended the Chiefs' training camp located at William Jewell College in Liberty, Missouri. He was later released by the Chiefs on August 30, 1982. During his time with the Chiefs Silipo wore jersey number 75.

=== Denver Gold ===
Silipo signed with the Denver Gold of the United States Football League (USFL) on December 7, 1982. Silipo would wear jersey number 66 for the Gold and went on to play in 17 games during their 1983 inaugural season.

=== San Antonio Gunslingers ===
He was selected by the San Antonio Gunslingers in the 3rd round (16th player selected) of the USFL expansion draft in September 1983. Silipo played in nine games during the 1984 season and returned to play in 1985 as well. Notable is the fact that Silipo and his teammates continued play during the 1985 season despite not being paid on a regular basis. As a result of the financial problems that owner Clinton Manges faced, the Gunslingers released all of their players, on July 22, 1985, just minutes before the deadline to pay the players for two overdue paychecks.

=== Buffalo Bills ===
Silipo signed with the Buffalo Bills as a replacement player during the 1987 players' strike. He played in his first and only regular season NFL game against the Indianapolis Colts on October 4 in front of 9,860 spectators at the 80,290-seat Rich Stadium. Two weeks later on October 20, 1987, he was placed on the injured reserve list, effectively ending his professional career.

== Post-football career ==
=== Endeavor Academy ===
He later worked as a physical education/health teacher at Endeavor Academy located in Centennial, Colorado.
