= San Antonio Gunslingers (USFL) =

American football team in Texas, US

General information
- Founded: 1977
- Folded: 1985
- Headquartered: Alamo Stadium in San Antonio, Texas
- Colors: Royal blue, kelly green, silver, white

Personnel
- Owner: Clinton Manges
- Head coach: 1984 Gil Steinke (7–11); 1985 Jim Bates (3–9); 1985 Gil Steinke (2–4)

Team history
- San Antonio Charros (1977–1981); San Antonio Bulls (1982–1983); San Antonio Gunslingers (1984–1985)

Home fields
- Alamo Stadium (1977–1985)

League / conference affiliations
- American Football Association (1977–1983): Western Division (1980–1981, 1983); Southwestern Division (1982); United States Football League (1984–1985): Western Conference (1984–1985); Central Division (1984)

Championships
- League championships: 1; 1977

Playoff appearances (6)
- 1977, 1978, 1979, 1980, 1981, 1983

The San Antonio Gunslingers were a professional American football team based in San Antonio, Texas, that played in the United States Football League (USFL) in 1984 and 1985. Owned by oil magnate Clinton Manges, the team played its home games in Alamo Stadium and its colors were kelly green, royal blue, silver, and white. Rick Neuheisel was the team's quarterback.

== History ==
In 1977 the San Antonio Charros were founded by Roger Gill as a charter member of the American Football Association. They went undefeated and won the first championship. After the 1981 season, the Charros changed their name to the Bulls. In 1982 Roger Gill was appointed AFA Commissioner; as part of the terms, Gill agreed to divest himself of the Bulls franchise. He sold the club to Clinton Manges in June of 1982. Under Manges, the Bulls were successful, appearing in the AFA's final championship (but losing in a shutout to the Carolina Chargers).

Going into the 1984 season, the USFL made the decision to expand to eighteen franchises in order to boost league capital. However, efforts to expand to Minneapolis-St. Paul and Seattle fell through. San Antonio was mentioned as a possible market for expansion, as rapid growth through the 1970s propelled it to major-city status. By 1984, almost 800,000 people lived in San Antonio, making it the 11th largest city in the United States. Despite this, a series of studies of possible new cities concluded that San Antonio could not support a USFL team. The San Antonio area, then as now, was considered a medium-sized market because the surrounding suburban and rural areas were far smaller than the city itself.

The owners were also somewhat skeptical about Manges's bid, not in the least because he planned to base the team at Alamo Stadium, a Works Progress Administration project and high school stadium that seated only 18,000 people. Ultimately, fears that Manges would seek a franchise in a proposed league started by WFL, American Basketball Association, and World Hockey Association co-founder Dennis Murphy tipped the scales in his favor. At the time, the flamboyant oil baron was a member of the Forbes 400, and was thought to be one of the richest men in Texas. The USFL did not want to risk losing his apparent wealth to a rival league. Ultimately, Murphy's proposed league folded before it could get off the ground when the USFL placed teams in three of its potential markets–San Antonio, Memphis, and Houston. Manges was unable to carry the Bulls name over because the Jacksonville Bulls claimed the name first.

The USFL had endeavored to avoid the mistakes of the ill-fated World Football League by requiring perspective owners to undergo a detailed due diligence and requiring franchises to meet strict capitalization requirements. However, apart from the concern about Alamo Stadium, it never performed a substantive review of Manges's original application. Once the Minnesota and Seattle franchises fell through, the league had few options left if it was to field 18 teams for the 1984 campaign. With little for anything beyond a cursory review of Manges's financial situation, league officials apparently concluded that given Manges' perceived wealth, his application carried little risk. Additionally, despite – or perhaps, because of – his apparent oil fortune, the league also didn't require Manges to make an initial capital investment (as is standard for most major league sports franchises). Instead, Manges appeared to pay team expenses out of his own pocket as they arose.

The result was an organization that was notoriously cheap, even by USFL standards. The front office was staffed mainly by friends and family. The team bus was an old San Antonio Independent School District bus with a malfunctioning gas gauge; the driver had to manually check the tank. The Gunslingers had to add 14,000 folding chairs around the end zones to bring the stadium to the USFL's minimum capacity. The team office was located in a double-wide trailer in the Alamo Stadium parking lot.

Manges hired local coaching legend Gil Steinke to run the team as general manager and head coach. In 23 years at nearby Texas A&I, Steinke had a record of 195–63–5, including a 6–1 record in NAIA Championship games. However, Steinke had been off the sidelines for almost a decade. More seriously, he was displaying clear signs of mental deterioration, almost to the point of senility. He frequently forgot plays and play calls and got lost in cities that he supposedly knew well. In a league with free-spending owners, Steinke's Gunslingers rarely had the edge in talent, but most games were very disciplined on the field, allowing them to remain somewhat competitive in spite of the team's shoestring budget.

=== 1984 season ===
The Gunslingers roster was populated with football players, not athletes. There were no true game breakers on the team. Nevertheless, they showed signs of offensive competence at times. Whenever they scored, more often than not it was the product of a long, drawn-out drive. The Gunslingers were an average rushing team, in spite of having no true feature back. Neuheisel played solidly as he nickel and dimed the team up and down the field, and the intense "Bounty Hunter" defense led by players like Jeff McIntyre, John Barefield, Peter Raeford, Rich D'Amico, Jim Bob Morris, and Putt Choate kept the Gunslingers within striking distance almost every week. Notably, the team was +13 in turnovers, a sign of a disciplined team.

Coach/general manager Steinke rallied the team to a 7–7 finish after an 0–4 start, keeping them in the playoff race until the last few weeks of the season. However, during their second game of the season, the lights at Alamo Stadium went out during their second game and didn't come back on for 48 minutes. Neuheisel alleged that the head of municipal power company City Public Service deliberately cut the power after having a falling-out with Manges. They finished the game with temporary lights, though by most accounts it was still somewhat dark.

The team remained competitive despite Alamo Stadium's poor playing conditions. The locker rooms were cramped and had no air conditioning. The playing surface was an extremely thin AstroTurf carpet atop a concrete slab, resulting in numerous knee injuries. Many players came down with skin infections because Manges was unwilling to pay to keep the field clean. The field was painted with industrial-grade paint that dried hard. Combined with the thin surface, rug burns usually common on artificial surfaces became severe rashes and scabs in San Antonio.

Additionally, team officials frequently deactivated non-marquee players every third game in a cost-cutting move. The standard USFL contract required players to be active in three consecutive games to earn their full salaries. Neuheisel recalled that players often faked injuries to keep from being deactivated.

The Gunslingers only drew 15,444 fans per game, in large part because they had already built a reputation for being short of professional standards. For instance, they tried to save money by mailing press releases in bulk, resulting in them arriving days after games. Among the promotions they attempted were cowboys firing real guns into the air.

=== Offseason ===
Defensive coordinator Jim Bates was rewarded with a promotion to head coach in 1985. However, according to Bates's successor as defensive coordinator, Tim Marcum, who would later go on to fame in the Arena Football League, the coaches and players already considered Bates to be their true on-field leader. Steinke remained general manager. They also acquired Larry Canada, the Chicago Blitz' leading rusher.

=== 1985 season ===
Despite their strong finish, by the start of the 1985 season, the Gunslingers were known to be badly undercapitalized, unlike most of their USFL brethren.

The Gunslingers' ramshackle financial structure caught up with them early in 1985. The price of oil tumbled as low as $11 or $12 a barrel, decimating Manges's fortune. The Gunslingers quickly fired all of their secretaries, and virtually all of the public relations staffers resigned. The on-field operation suffered as well; they had no scouts or practice squad. It would soon emerge that the Gunslingers' owner had been in financial trouble since at least 1980.

With Manges suddenly unwilling and/or unable to underwrite the franchise's mounting expenses, the club found itself in a situation not unlike those faced by many teams in the ill-fated WFL. Players and coaches frequently had their checks bounce. Neuheisel and McIntyre were the only two players with a personal services contract. When the San Antonio Express-News broke the story, Manges reacted by revoking the paper's press credentials. The situation got so dire at one point that several players traded tickets for food and stayed with sympathetic fans because they couldn't afford to pay the rent for their apartments. Years later, Neuheisel told ESPN that the players raced each other to the bank to cash their checks, knowing that half (if not more) of them would bounce. However, the team had to use creative methods to meet payroll even before then; as mentioned above, they were notorious for deactivating players every third game.

The San Antonio Light reported that the Internal Revenue Service had slapped two liens on the Gunslingers for over $400,000 in back payroll taxes, further squeezing the franchise's financial picture. Eventually, Manges ordered his employees not to discuss the team's finances, and even had reporters bounced from the locker room.

On April 7, Manges promised that the payroll problem would be fixed, going as far as to issue promissory notes. However, the checks bounced again on the following payday, which particularly rankled the players when they saw Manges and his top staffers riding limousines. A month later, the team was nearly left stranded in Orlando when the check for the flight home bounced. They only made it back to San Antonio after Lieutenant Governor Bill Hobby, a Manges confidant, intervened to guarantee payment. After another late payroll on May 29, the players walked out of practice, and only returned after Manges told team president Bud Haun that he would shut the team down if they didn't return.

On one occasion, an arbitrator threatened to release 30 players from their contracts if Manges didn't make good on their bounced checks. On another, several players threatened to sit out a June 9 game against the Los Angeles Express unless they were paid. After a month of missed paydays, Bates threatened to quit unless the players were paid by the team's contest against the Oakland Invaders. The money never arrived, and Bates walked out, forcing Steinke to take over for the last six games of the season.

In June, Manges simply stopped paying the franchise's bills. The players and coaches played the last four games of the season without being paid. Not surprisingly, the Gunslingers barely survived the season. Due in large part to a nonexistent rushing attack (their leading rusher, George Works, only ran for a total of 452 yards), they finished with the second-worst record in the league. Attendance crashed to 11,721, the second-worst in the league. Shortly after the season, after another missed payroll, the entire roster was put on waivers.

=== Aftermath ===
A month after the season, Commissioner Harry Usher had seen enough. He ordered Manges to make restitution for the team's debts in 15 days, or lose the franchise. When this didn't occur, the Gunslingers became the only USFL franchise to be revoked. The dubious distinction was, to an extent, academic. The USFL, which had been planning to move to a fall schedule in 1986, ultimately folded without playing another game.

The Gunslingers' holding company, South Texas Sports, was auctioned off to pay more than $650,000 of debts to former players. The players also sued Manges to recover back pay, but that suit collapsed when Manges filed for bankruptcy. At least some of the players still hadn't been paid at the time of a 1998 reunion, and no players or staff members that were owed back wages had been paid at the time of Manges's death in 2010.

== Average home attendance ==
- 1984: (15,444)
- 1985: (11,721)

== Game results ==
=== 1984 ===
Week	Date	Opponent	Result	Record	Venue	Attendance
Preaseason
1	Bye					
2	February 4	vs. Houston Gamblers	L 17–19	0–1	Harlingen, Texas	
3	February 11	vs. Memphis Showboats	W 13–3	1–1	Shreveport, Louisiana	
4	February 18	Birmingham Stallions	L 15–23	1–2	Alamo Stadium	
Regular season
1	February 26	New Orleans Breakers	L10–13	0–1	Alamo Stadium	18,233
2	March 5	Houston Gamblers	L 7–35	0–2	Alamo Stadium	10,023
3	March 11	at Oklahoma Outlaws	L 7–14	0–3	Skelly Stadium	24,311
4	March 17	Los Angeles Express	L 12–13	0–4	Alamo Stadium	9,821
5	March 24	Oakland Invaders	W 14–10	1–4	Alamo Stadium	11,012
6	April 1	at Michigan Panthers	L 10–26	1–5	Pontiac Silverdome	42,692
7	April 7	at Chicago Blitz	L 10–16	1–6	Soldier Field	9,412
8	April 14	at Jacksonville Bulls	W 20–0	2–6	Gator Bowl Stadium	35,084
9	April 22	Philadelphia Stars	L 14–20	2–7	Alamo Stadium	16,590
10	April 28	at Arizona Wranglers	W 24–23	3–7	Sun Devil Stadium	12,259
11	May 6	Chicago Blitz	W 30–21	4–7	Alamo Stadium	15,231
12	May 11	at Memphis Showboats	L 14–38	4–8	Liberty Bowl Memorial Stadium	32,406
13	May 20	at Washington Federals	W 30–14	5–8	RFK Stadium	6,159
14	May 25	Denver Gold	L 20–27	5–9	Alamo Stadium	20,077
15	June 1	Michigan Panthers	L 17–23 (OT)	5–10	Alamo Stadium	16,384
16	June 11	at Pittsburgh Maulers	W 17–3	6–10	Three Rivers Stadium	17,148
17	June 18	at Houston Gamblers	L 26–29	6–11	Houston Astrodome	30,184
18	June 24	Oklahoma Outlaws	W 23–0	7–11	Alamo Stadium	21,625

=== 1985 ===
Week	Date	Opponent	Result	Record	Venue	Attendance
Preseason
1	February 2	Birmingham Stallions	T 0–0	0–0–1	Alamo Stadium	
2	February 9	vs. Houston Gamblers	L 21–28	0–1–1	McAllen, Texas	
3	February 16	Denver Gold	W 36–13	1–1–1	Alamo Stadium	
Regular season
1	February 25	Memphis Showboats	L 3–20	0–1	Alamo Stadium	10,983
2	March 3	Arizona Outlaws	W 16–14	1–1	Alamo Stadium	11,151
3	March 10	Tampa Bay Bandits	L 18–31	1–2	Alamo Stadium	21,822
4	March 16	at Los Angeles Express	L 7–38	1–3	Los Angeles Memorial Coliseum	10,410
5	March 25	at Denver Gold	L 2–16	1–4	Mile High Stadium	13,901
6	April 1	at Portland Breakers	W 33–0	2–4	Civic Stadium	19,882
7	April 7	Birmingham Stallions	W 15–14	3–4	Alamo Stadium	8,873
8	April 12	at Jacksonville Bulls	L 17–28	3–5	Gator Bowl Stadium	32,097
9	April 22	at Oakland Invaders	L 20–27	3–6	Oakland–Alameda County Coliseum	18,215
10	April 28	Houston Gamblers	L 29–38	3–7	Alamo Stadium	9,723
11	May 5	Denver Gold	L 9–35	4–8	Alamo Stadium	9,753
12	May 13	at Orlando Renegades	L 20–21	3–9	Florida Citrus Bowl	22,404
13	May 18	Oakland Invaders	L 21–24	3–10	Alamo Stadium	7,118
14	May 26	at Baltimore Stars	L 10–28	3–11	Byrd Stadium	8,633
15	June 1	at Arizona Outlaws	L 3–13	3–12	Sun Devil Stadium	11,151
16	June 9	Los Angeles Express	W 31–27	4–12	Alamo Stadium	4,963
17	June 17	at Houston Gamblers	L 21–49	4–13	Houston Astrodome	11,780
18	June 23	Portland Breakers	W 21–13	5–13	Alamo Stadium	19,603

== Rosters ==
=== 1984 ===
NO. NAME (POS) – GP/GS

- 5. MIKE-MAYER, Nick (K) – 18/0
- 7. NEUHEISEL, Rick (QB) – 16/16
- 8. WHITE, Alvin (QB) – 3/0
- 9. HARTLEY, Ken (P) – 15/0
- 10. FORD, Mike (QB) – 2/1
- 11. TORCHIO, Lloyd J. (QB) – 3/0
- 14. MORTENSEN, Fred (QB) – IA/2G
- 16. DOUGLASS, Karl (QB) – 2/1
- 17. PRYOR, David (P) – 3/0
- 20. RAEFORD, Peter (CB) – 18/18
- 21. BONNER, Marcus (RB) – 18/7
- 22. GORDON, Jerry (WR) – 13/13
- 23. ULMER, Mike (FS) – 18/7
- 25. ANDERSON, Gary (CB) – IA/2G
- 26. JERNIGAN, Hugh (CB) – 2/0
- 27. SMITH, Daryl (FS) – IA/2G
- 28. MORRIS, Jim Bob (SS) – 15/14
- 29. RICHMOND, Rock (CB) – 17/6
- 30. STAMPER, Scott (FB) – 11/9
- 31. WHITE, Jafus (SS) – 7/0
- 34. HAGEN, Mike (FB) – 16/9
- 35. PENN-WHITE, Al (RB) – 7/6
- 40. WORKS, George (RB) – 8/2
- 41. GREENE, Doug (SS) – 1/0
- 41. BEDFORD, Vance (CB) – 1/0
- 42. TYLER, Maurice (CB) – 17/12
- 43. ROBERTS, Don (RB) – 15/3
- 44. ARMSTEAD, Charles (CB) – 7/2
- 47. WADDY, Ray (FS) – 17/17
- 49. RUSH, Mark (FB) – 7/0
- 49. THOMPSON, Emmuel (CB) – 2/0
- 50. NEAL, Tally (LB) – 15/0
- 51. D'AMICO, Rich (LB) – 18/18
- 52. OLIVER, Reggie (LB) – 17/2
- 53. CASTILLO, Juan (LB) – 6/0
- 54. MILLS, DAVE (LB) – 6/4
- 54. SPEROS, Pete (C/LS) – 9/0
- 55. CHOATE, Putt (LB) – 18/18
- 56. RIVERA, Jimmy (LB) – 5/0
- 57. SILIPO, Joe (C) – 9/0
- 58. BAREFIELD, John (LB) – 12/12
- 59. McCORMICK, Glenn (C/LS) – 7/3
- 59. McINTYRE, Jeff (LB) – 1/0
- 60. WINTERS, Bill (C) – 12/12
- 61. GARZA, Rich (G) – 18/18
- 62. MUESKE, Darryl (G) – IA/4G
- 63. THOMPSON, Arland (G) – 18/18
- 65. HANNA, Paul (NT) – 17/17
- 66. JOHNSON, Gary Don (DT) – 9/0
- 68. ZOGG, John (G/T) – 5/0
- 70. LOHMANN, Jim (T) – 2/0
- 71. WILLIAMS, Ralph (T) – 18/18
- 72. WHITE, Victor (T) – IA/2G
- 73. PEKAR, Jim (DT) – 1/1
- 72. JONKER, Kurt (T) – DNP/2G
- 75. SPIVEY, Lee (T) – 17/17
- 76. GILLEN, Ken (DE) – 18/18
- 77. TABOR, Tommy (NT) – 18/12
- 78. ST. CLAIR, Mike (DE) – 18/18
- 79. FIELDS, Greg (DE) – 17/0
- 81. HACKETT, Joey (TE) – 18/18
- 82. O'ROARK, Larry (WR) – 2/0
- 82. CRANE, Darryl (WR) – 3/0
- 83. OSBORNE, Rich (TE) – 7/0
- 84. VELA, David (WR) – 2/0
- 84. PARKER, Rodney (WR) – 4/1
- 85. PHEA, Lonell (WR) – 2/2
- 85. MONROE, Terry (DT) – 10/1
- 86. ARMSTRONG, Tony (TE) – 10/0
- 87. GABBIDON, Earl (TE) – 4/0
- 88. BUGGS, Danny (WR) – 17/17
- 89. STARKS, Glenn (WR) – 12/3
- 90. KIRKPATRICK, Ron (DE) – IA/1G
- 95. CASE, Frank (DE) – 18/0
- 99. FIELDS, Greg (DE) – 17/0

INJURED RESERVE

- 97. PRICE, Ernest (DT) – IR/16G

=== 1985 ===
NO. NAME (POS) – GP/GS

- 5. MIKE-MAYER, Nick (K) – 18/0
- 7. NEUHEISEL, Rick (QB) – 18/16
- 9. HARTLEY, Ken (P) – 5/0
- 10. TAYLOR, Whit (QB) – 17/1
- 11. ROBERTS, Buddy (P) – IA/1G
- 14. MORTENSEN, Fred (QB) – 12/1
- 20. RAEFORD, Peter (CB) – 18/17
- 21. BONNER, Marcus (RB) – 18/10
- 22. GORDON, Jerry (WR) – 18/17
- 23. ULMER, Mike (FS) – 8/0
- 24. JAMES, Larry (FS) – 18/3
- 25. MINOR, Vic (FS) – 18/16
- 26. McNEIL, Mark (CB) – 11/0
- 27. WORTHY, Gary (RB) – 10/7
- 28. MORRIS, Jim Bob (SS) – 17/17
- 29. WILLIAMS, Leon (CB) – 17/1
- 30. STAMPER, Scott (FB) – 18/11
- 32. JOHNSON, Clyde (SS) – 18/11
- 33. WORKS, George (RB) – 10/5
- 34. HAGEN, Mike (FB) – 10/0
- 35. CANADA, Larry (FB) – 17/4
- 43. ROBERTS, Don (RB) – 18/5
- 44. ARMSTEAD, Charles (CB) – 18/18
- 48. HADNOT, James (TE) – 14/9
- 49. RUSH, Mark (TE) – 5/1
- 50. NEAL, Tally (LB) – 5/0
- 51. D'AMICO, Rich (LB) – 18/13
- 52. OLIVER, Reggie (LB) – 18/1
- 53. CASTILLO, Juan (LB) – 7
- 54. MILLS, DAVE (LB) – 6/4
- 55. CHOATE, Putt (LB) – 18/18
- 56. MATHIS, Reggie (LB) – 13/0
- 57. SILIPO, Joe (C/LS) – 18/0
- 58. BAREFIELD, John (LB) – 7/7
- 60. LEIDING, Jeff (LB) – 11/4
- 61. GARZA, Rich (C) – 18/18
- 63. THOMPSON, Arland (G) – 18/14
- 65. HANNA, Paul (DT) – 7/4
- 68. ZOGG, John (G) – IA/3G
- 69. ROBERTS, Carl (G) – 18/0
- 70. WALTERS, Rod (G) – 18/18
- 71. WILLIAMS, Ralph (T) – 18/18
- 75. SPIVEY, Lee (T) – 16/16
- 76. GILLEN, Ken (DE) – 11/11
- 77. CHAFFIN, Jeff (DE) – 18/7
- 78. JENKINS, Mark (T) – 18/2
- 80. HILL, Al (WR) – IA/7G
- 80. LOCKETT, Frank (WR) – 8/6
- 81. HACKETT, Joey (TE) – 18/16
- 83. GREENE, Sammy (WR) – IA/1G
- 83. COFFMAN, Ricky (WR) – 9/0
- 85. TOLBERT, Mark (WR) – 5/0
- 86. WILLIAMS, Kevin (WR) – 8/5
- 87. WILLIAMS, Oliver (WR) – 5/0
- 88. BUGGS, Danny (WR) – 8/4
- 90. TABOR, Tommy (DT) – 12/0
- 91. GAYLORD, Jeff (DT) – 7/7
- 92. HAYES, Jay (DE) – IA/5G
- 92. RUSHING, Ralph (DE) – 1/0
- 93. ANAE, Brad (DE) – 16/0
- 94. SMITH, Bennie (DT) – 15/7
- 95. LESNIK, Ivan (DT) – 18/18
- 99. FIELDS, Greg (DE) – 18/18

== Season-by-season ==
Season records
Season	W	L	T	Finish	Playoff results
1977	8	0	0	1st	W Championship
1978	6	4	0	2nd	W Semifinals
1979	10	4	0	2nd	L Semifinals
1980	6	4	0	2nd Western Division	L Semifinals
1981	6	6	0	2nd Western Division	L Semifinals
1982	4	6	0	4th Southwestern Division	--
1983	6	1	0	1st Western Division	L Championship
1984	7	11	0	3rd WC Central	--
1985	5	13	0	6th WC	–
Totals	58	49	0		

== Single-season leaders ==
- Rushing yards: 500 Scott Stamper (American football)(1984), 452 George Works (1985)
- Receiving yards: 690 Jerry Gordon (1985), 650 Jerry Gordon (1984)
- Passing yards: 3068 Rick Neuheisel (1985), 2649 Rick Neuheisel (1984)
