= Cardinal Stadium (1956) =

Stadium in Louisville, Kentucky, US

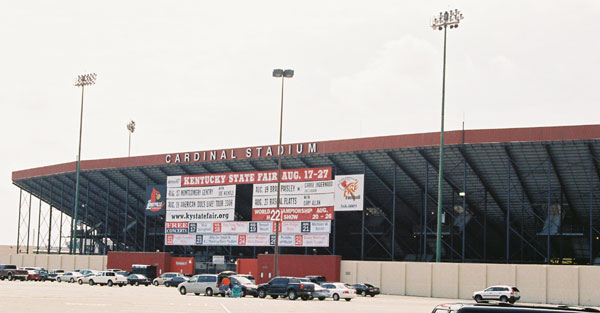
- Interactive map of Cardinal Stadium
- Former names: Fairgrounds Stadium (1956–1982)
- Location: 937 Phillips Lane; Louisville, Kentucky; United States
- Coordinates: 38°12′8″N 85°44′34″W
- Owner: Kentucky State Fair Board
- Operator: Kentucky Exposition Center
- Capacity: 47,925; Stage Set-up: 19,901; End Stage Set-up: 47,925; Football: 36,103; Baseball: 19,901
- Surface: AstroTurf
- Field size: Baseball: Left field - 360 feet (110 m); Center field - 405 feet (123 m); Right field - 312 feet (95 m)

Construction
- Opened: 1956
- Closed: 2014; 12 years ago
- Demolished: 2019

Tenants
- Louisville Cardinals (NCAA) teams: Football (1957–1997); Men's soccer (1979–1999); Baseball (1998–2004); Professional teams: Louisville Raiders (UFL) (1960–1962); Louisville Colonels (IL) (1968–1972); Kentucky Trackers (AFA) (1979–1982); Louisville Redbirds (AA/IL) (1982–1998)

Cardinal Stadium was a multi-purpose stadium in Louisville, Kentucky. It was on the grounds of the Kentucky Exposition Center, and was called Fairgrounds Stadium when it first opened for an NFL exhibition football game between the Baltimore Colts and Philadelphia Eagles on September 9, 1956. It was demolished in 2019.

== History ==
The lone Bluegrass Bowl was held here in 1958. Cardinal Stadium was home to the Louisville Raiders football team from 1960 through 1962. It was the home to two minor league baseball teams in Louisville: the Louisville Colonels in 1957-1962 and again in 1968–1972 and the Louisville Redbirds in 1982–1999. It was to be the home of the American League Kansas City Athletics when their owner Charlie Finley signed a contract to move the team to Louisville in 1964, but the American League owners voted against the move. The Kentucky Trackers of the AFA played at Cardinal Stadium 1979–1980. It also served as the home of the University of Louisville football team from 1957 to 1997 and their baseball team from 1998 to 2004. It was also used heavily as a high school football stadium, hosting state championship games from 1964 to 2002, including hosting all four state championship games played annually 1979–2002.

The Dallas Cowboys' first win in franchise history came in August 1960 at Fairgrounds Stadium. The Cowboys won an exhibition game against the New York Giants 14–3.

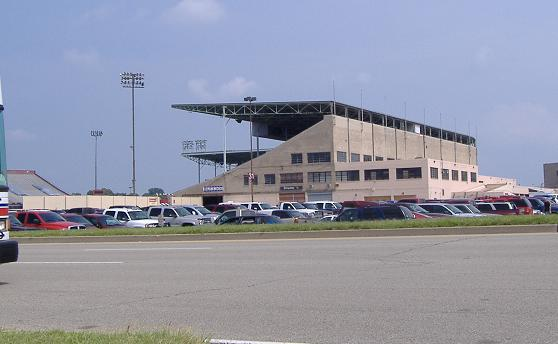
Exterior of Cardinal Stadium pictured in 2006

The stadium was renamed Cardinal Stadium in 1982 when the Louisville Redbirds (now the Louisville Bats) of the American Association became co-tenants of the stadium.

Cardinal Stadium hosted the 1991 Triple-A All-Star Game. The team of National League-affiliated All-Stars defeated the team of American League-affiliated All-Stars, 6–5.

After the university's football team moved into the new on-campus Cardinal Stadium, now known as L&N Federal Credit Union Stadium, in 1998 and the Redbirds moved downtown to Louisville Slugger Field in 2000, the stadium was largely vacant for the rest of its life, with its primary use as a venue for music concert and automotive events occurring during the Kentucky State Fair. Outside of the concerts for the Kentucky State Fair, the Rolling Stones played a concert at Cardinal Stadium on September 19, 1989, as part of the Steel Wheels Tour. Living Color opened for the legendary rock band. Boy band N'Sync performed at Cardinal Stadium on August 10, 2001, as part of the PopOdyssey Tour.

From 2001 to 2003, the Bands of America Louisville Regional Championships were held at the stadium.

== Demolition ==
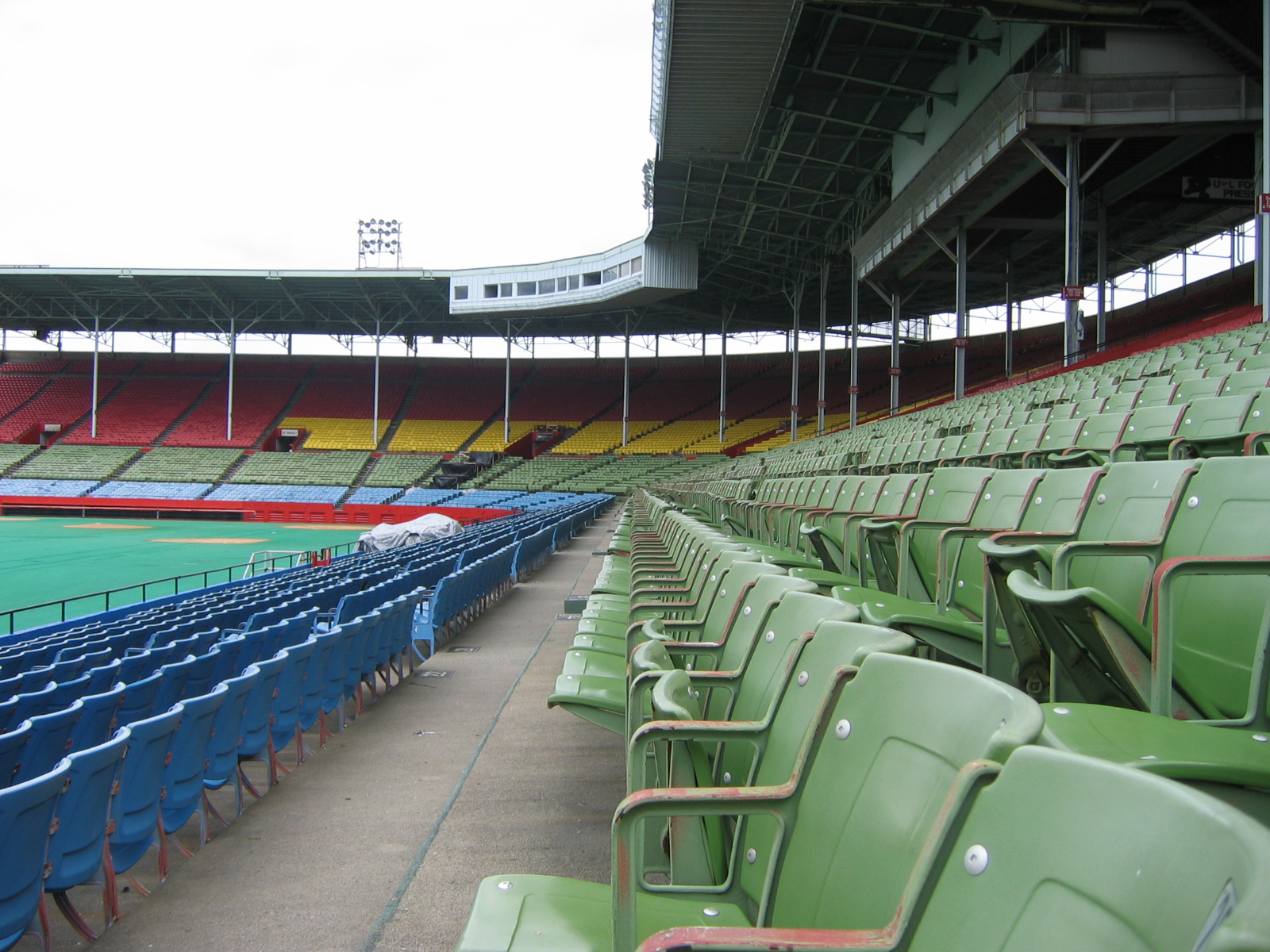
Grandstand and seats in 2008

Local proposals included the demolition of Cardinal Stadium in order to build a new arena, as part of a long term push to build a new indoor-facility to replace the aging Freedom Hall, which is also at the Exposition Center. This became moot with the 2010 opening of the downtown KFC Yum! Center and continued use of Freedom Hall as a venue for concerts and smaller sporting events. More recent plans from the Kentucky State Fair Board sought to demolish this facility to build an outdoor amphitheater with permanent seating for 12,000. On April 26, 2013, the Kentucky State Fair Board stated that the stadium's grandstands were unsafe. Seating was placed on the field for concerts at the 2013 and 2014 Kentucky State Fair. Demolition of the most unsafe portions of the stadium (mainly the football-specific east grandstand) began on November 17, 2014.

During its 2018 regular session, the Kentucky General Assembly approved funds for the complete demolition of Old Cardinal Stadium, and in September of that year, the president of the Kentucky State Fair Board told legislators that complete demolition would start sometime in early 2019. The Fair Board has issued a request for proposals by private contractors to redevelop the stadium site.

Demolition was to officially commence the afternoon of January 24, 2019, with a media event featuring Governor Matt Bevin. The media event was cancelled. After weather-related delays, demolition officially began on March 20, 2019. Demolition was completed in June 2019.

== See also ==
- Sports in Louisville, Kentucky
