= Jim Bob Morris =

American former professional football player and businessman

No. 28, 47
- Position: Safety

Personal information
- Born: May 17, 1961 (age 65); Virgil, Kansas, U.S.
- Listed height: 6 ft 4 in (1.93 m)
- Listed weight: 257 lb (117 kg)

Career information
- High school: Hamilton (Hamilton, Kansas)
- College: Kansas State
- NFL draft: 1983: undrafted

Career history
- Kansas City Chiefs (1983)*; San Antonio Gunslingers (1984-1985); Green Bay Packers (1987); Houston Oilers (1989)*
- * Offseason or practice squad member only

Awards and highlights
- Second-team All-Big Eight (1980)

Career NFL statistics
- Interceptions: 3
- Sacks: 1
- Stats at Pro Football Reference

Jim Bob Morris is an American former professional football player who was a safety for the Green Bay Packers in 1987–88 in the National Football League (NFL) and played in the USFL for three years with the San Antonio Gunslingers and Memphis Showboats. Morris is the CEO of Wanna, Morris Packaging, and El Bandido Yankee Tequila.

Jim Bob grew up in Virgil, Kansas, population 60. He attended Hamilton High where he was All-State in football, basketball and track and holds records for most points scored in a football game of 76 points, scoring 12 touchdowns and 2 extra points, most yards rushed, 354, and total yards for a game, 768. He also holds the team record for most points scored in a basketball game at 48.

He was signed to a basketball scholarship at Coffeyville Community College in 1978. During his freshman year at Coffeyville he played football, basketball and track. His freshman year the team record was 10–1 and capped the year as Coca-Cola Bowl Champions defeating Iowa Central the number one ranked team in the country by a margin of 38–6. Jim also played guard on the nationally ranked basketball team, playing in the National Championship tournament, and he participated in track winning a spot to attend the Junior College National Track Championship as a triple jumper placing 4th. Jim Bob was selected to the All Jayhawk Juco All Conference Team and was an All-American per the "Grid Wire". He was voted as student body president in 1979 and won the Presidents Athlete Award as well.

After the 1979 season, Jim Bob was offered a football scholarship to attend Kansas State University where he was coached by Jim Dickey. Jim Bob was an immediate starter for Kansas State and earned All Big Eight honors as a safety and helped lead Kansas State to their first bowl appearance in the school's history in 1982 at the Independence Bowl versus Wisconsin. He led the team in interceptions in 1981.

After graduation Jim Bob signed a free agent contract with the Kansas City Chiefs. He subsequently played for in the USFL for the San Antonio Gunslingers (1984–86) and the Memphis Showboats (1986). In 1987, he joined the Green Bay Packers and lead the team and league in interception return yardage with 174 yards and was second on the team in sacks. He holds the record for the first-year player interceptions for Green Bay. He joined the Houston Oilers as a free agent in 1989 and officially retired from football in 1990.

Jim Bob and his former wife Lori have four children, Alexandra, Nicholas, James and AvaGrace. They live in Jupiter, FL. He is the owner and proprietor of several food packaging and ingredients companies as well as a partner with an arena football team, Bloomington Edge, and started a professional basketball team Central Illinois Drive.

In December 2018, it was announced that Jim Bob gave the lead gift for The Morris Family Multicultural Student Center at Kansas State University. The building is to be named in honor of his family. As of December 7, 2018, the project had secured $4.2 million of the $5.5 million project goal. The current plan is for the center to open in fall 2020 and be connected to the K-State Student Union.

In August 2019, Jim Bob and Carson Coffman launched Wanna, a peer-to-peer sports betting app that is currently only in Brazil. Wanna aims to be the social network for betting peer-to-peer against other people.

In October 2021, Jim Bob launched El Bandido Tequila with Hall of Fame NHL player, Chris Chelios. El Bandido Tequila has 3 products: blanco, reposado, and anejo. El Bandido Tequila has won 2 gold medal awards from BTI.
