= Bill Winters (gridiron football) =

American football player (born 1954)

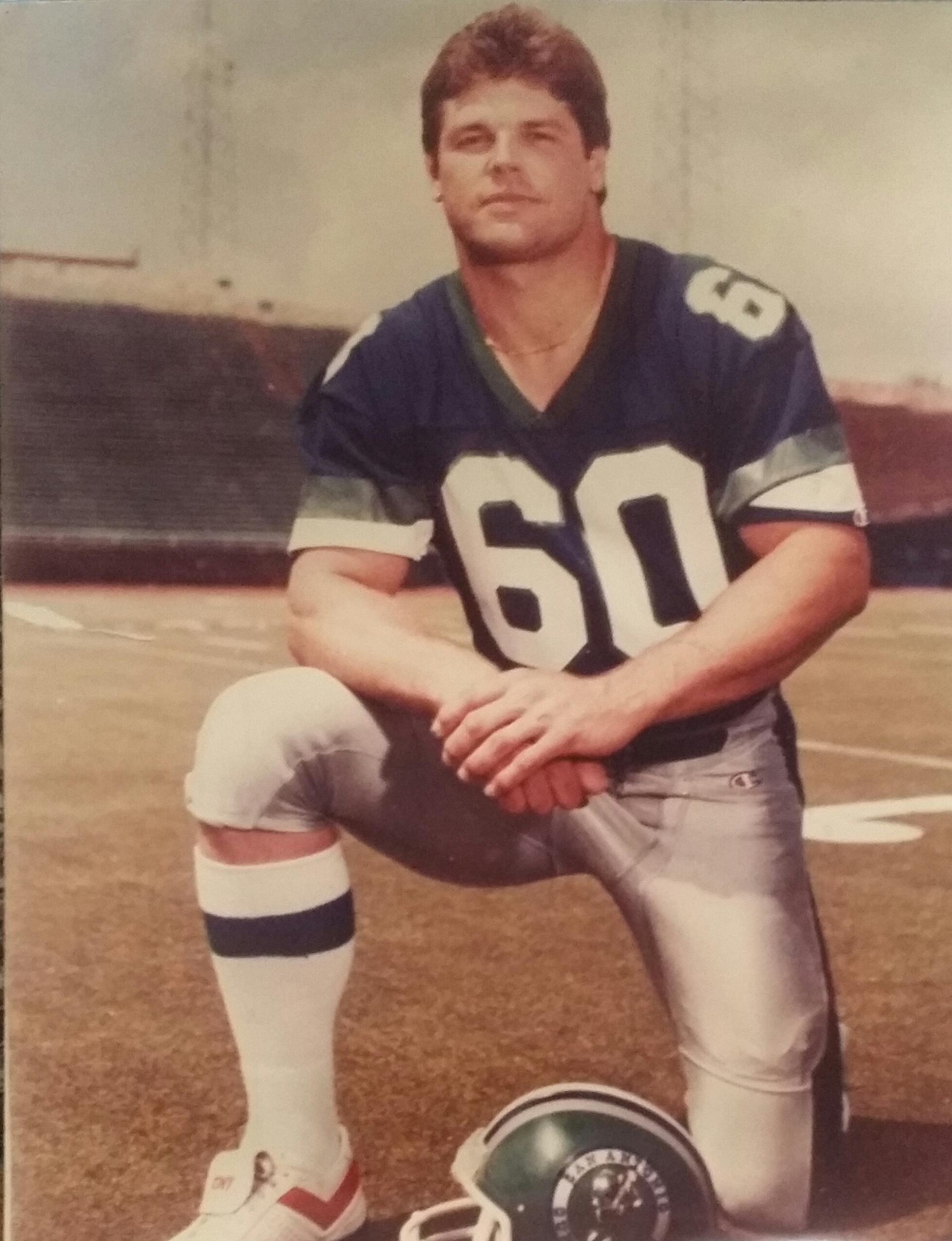
- Winters with the San Antonio Gunslingers in 1984

No. 60, 55, 61
- Positions: Center, guard, tackle, long snapper

Personal information
- Born: July 22, 1954 (age 72); Asbury Park, New Jersey, U.S.
- Listed height: 6 ft 5 in (1.96 m)
- Listed weight: 275 lb (125 kg)

Career information
- High school: Tinton Falls (NJ) Monmouth Regional
- College: Princeton
- NFL draft: 1976: undrafted

Career history
- Washington Redskins (1976)*; New York Giants (1977); Montreal Alouettes (1978–1979); BC Lions (1979); Orlando Americans (1981); Carolina Storm (1982); Tampa Bay Bandits (1983–1984); San Antonio Gunslingers (1984); Portland Breakers (1984–1985)
- * Offseason or practice squad member only

Awards and highlights
- AFA American Bowl champion (1982)

Bill Winters (born William Randolph Kahl-Winter on July 22, 1954) is an American former professional football offensive lineman who played in the Canadian Football League (CFL), American Football Association (AFA), and United States Football League (USFL) during the 1970s and 1980s. He played college football for Princeton University. He was a member of the Washington Redskins and New York Giants of the National Football League (NFL), the Montreal Alouettes and BC Lions of the CFL, the Orlando Americans and Carolina Storm of the AFA, and the Tampa Bay Bandits, San Antonio Gunslingers, and Portland Breakers of the USFL.

== Early life ==
Winters was born in Asbury Park in the Wanamassa section of Ocean Township, Monmouth County, New Jersey. He grew up in nearby Tinton Falls and played high school football, baseball, and basketball for the Monmouth Regional High School Golden Falcons. Winters was an All-Shore and All-County selection as a three-year quarterback for the team and won the prestigious Thom McAn Scholar Athlete Award for Monmouth County his senior year. He also played catcher on the baseball team and forward on the basketball team.

== College career ==
Winters received a full academic scholarship to Princeton University where he graduated with a A.B. in History and a teaching certification in Social Studies. He lettered for the Princeton Tigers, starting out as a quarterback and then moving to tight end where he played his freshman, sophomore, and junior years. His senior year, he played tight end and offensive tackle.

== Professional career ==
Upon graduation, Winters attended a free agent tryout camp and earned a contract as an offensive lineman with George Allen's Washington Redskins in 1976, but was released in training camp. In 1977, he signed with new head coach John McVay and the New York Giants receiving a $5,000 signing bonus. He suffered a ruptured appendix on July 26 due to dehydration during a controlled offensive scrimmage against the New York Jets. Winters was expected to make the final roster with McVay stating on August 9 that "We're going to keep a spot open on our final roster for him," and "That's how much we think of him." On August 17, Winters was placed on the non-football related injury list by the Giants in the hopes of being activated onto the roster once healthy, but developed an infection (peritonitis) keeping him out for the remainder of the season.

Winters was released the following year in training camp on August 15, and picked up on a five-day trial by the Montreal Alouettes of the CFL. He started at right tackle for the remainder of the season which included six of the next eight regular season games, two playoff games and the 66th Grey Cup. The following year, he was traded to the BC Lions during training camp and played in one preseason game but suffered a knee injury during it. The injury required surgery and resulted in him being placed on injured reserve for the season. He spent the 1980 season rehabilitating his knee and started a career as a financial consultant and legally shortened his name to Bill Winters. He went on to play two full seasons in the AFA starting twelve games at center for the Orlando Americans in 1981 and thirteen games at right guard and right tackle for the Carolina Storm in 1982. The Storm went undefeated at 13–0 and won the American Bowl league championship that year.

In 1983, Winters signed on with the Tampa Bay Bandits of the newly emerging USFL where he started 11 of the team's first 12 games at left guard for head coach Steve Spurrier, before sustaining a stress fracture of his right leg ending his season. He was waived in training camp the following year in 1984, but recalled by the Bandits off waivers after the first regular season game. He was then waived again three games into the regular season, but was claimed by the San Antonio Gunslingers of the USFL, where he started 13 of the last 14 games at center for head coach Gil Steinke in their inaugural season. He also did the snapping for field goals and extra points. In 1985, he was traded in the off-season to the Portland Breakers where he rejoined his former line coach from San Antonio Mike Barry. He played 18 games for the Breakers, starting one game at right guard for head coach Dick Coury. The following year Winters was to sign and play for the Orlando Renegades of the USFL and head coach Lee Corso, but the USFL ceased operations and Winters retired from professional football.

== Life after football ==
Winters has worked as a financial consultant and insurance agent, as well as having done some acting and voice over work, writing and some coaching. He authored a book called From the Outhouse to the Penthouse and Somewhere in Between: The Story of One Free Agent's Trip Through the Ranks of Pro Football. He is a lifetime member of the National Football League Players Association and a member of the Screen Actors Guild. After serving as a teacher for 9 years and a coach for 4 years in the Spring Independent School District in Houston, Texas, where he helped coach the Spring Dekaney High School Wildcats to a 2011 5A Division II State Football Championship and a 20th MaxPreps Final National Ranking, he resigned his position to pursue new opportunities.

== Acting appearances ==
=== Television ===
- Fortune Hunter (1994) Guest star as Dawson the star QB
- Pointman (1994) Guest star as Donegan the prison guard

=== Commercials ===
- Nolan Ryan National for Advil (1994) - Featured -Baseball Player at bat

== Coaching experience ==
- University of Florida (1988) Graduate assistant, offensive line coach - training camp
- Montreal Machine (1991) Volunteer coach - training camp
- University of Central Florida (1992) Assistant offensive line coach / special teams
- Rhein Fire (2001) Assistant offensive line coach - training camp
- Tampa Bay Tech H.S. (2005) Offensive line coach
- Princeton University (2006) Sprint football offensive line coach
- Tarpon Springs H.S. (2007) Offensive line coach
- Team Florida All American Football League (2008–2009) Assistant offensive line coach
- Spring Dekaney H.S. (2009–2014) Assistant offensive line coach / track coach
