= Monmouth Regional High School =

High school in Monmouth County, New Jersey, US

Address
- One Norman J. Field Way Tinton Falls, Monmouth County, New Jersey, 07724; United States

District information
- Grades: 9–12
- Superintendent: Brian Evans
- Business administrator: Lori Youngclaus
- Schools: 1

Students and staff
- Enrollment: 891 (as of 2024–25)
- Faculty: 89.9 FTEs
- Student–teacher ratio: 9.9:1

Other information
- District Factor Group: GH
- Website: www.monmouthregional.net
Ind.	Per pupil	District spending	Rank (*)	9-12 average	%± vs. average
1A	Total Spending	$26,178	44	$18,891	38.6%
1	Budgetary Cost	19,602	45	15,592	25.7%
2	Classroom Instruction	10,216	42	8,807	16.0%
6	Support Services	3,949	47	2,294	72.1%
8	Administrative Cost	1,726	29	1,592	8.4%
10	Operations & Maintenance	2,408	44	1,954	23.2%
13	Extracurricular Activities	1,123	39	873	28.6%
16	Median Teacher Salary	58,950	6	71,726
Data from NJDoE 2014 Taxpayers' Guide to Education Spending. *Of 9-12 districts with any number of students. Lowest spending=1; Highest=47

Monmouth Regional High School
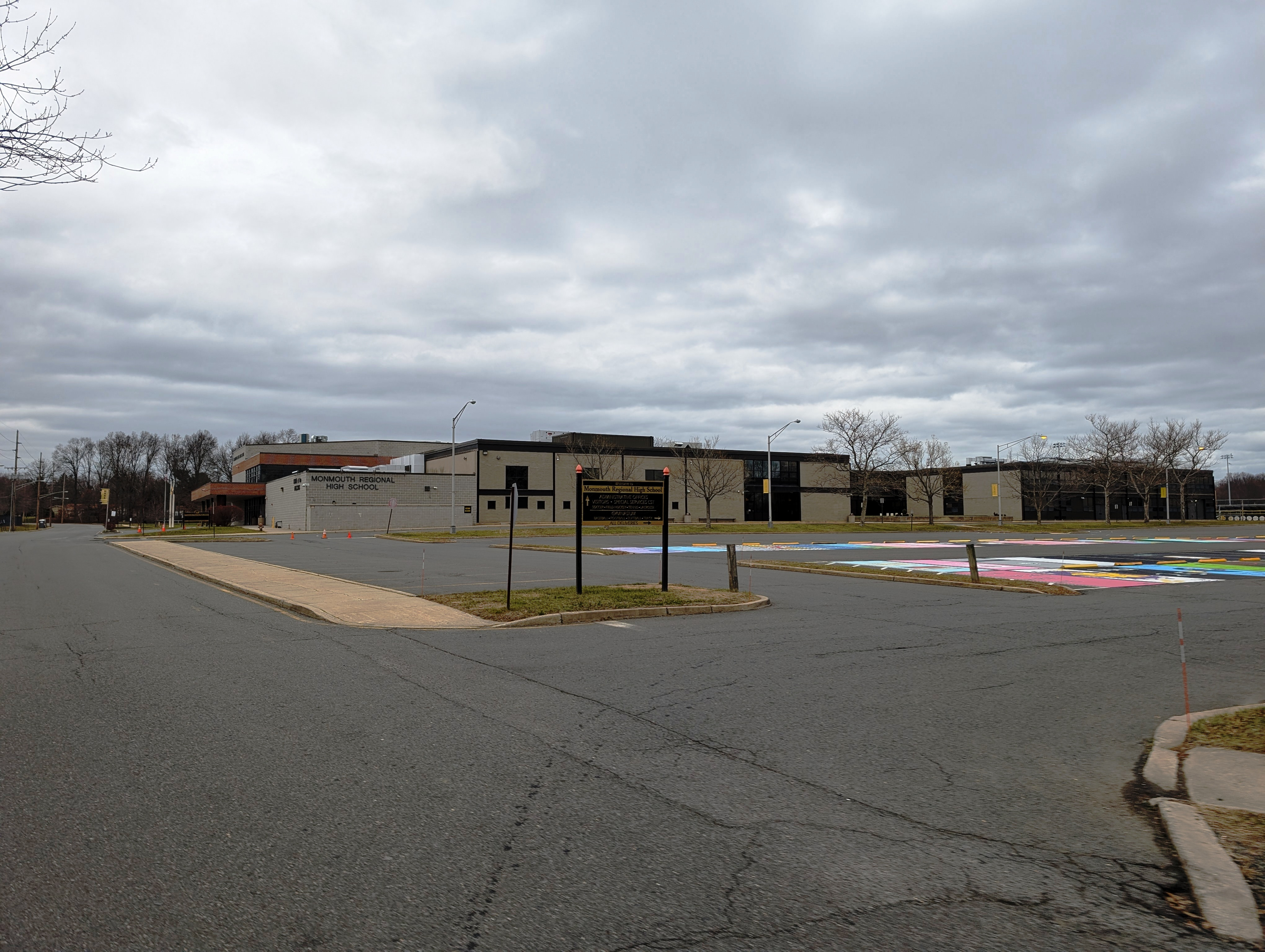

Location
- 40.302853°N 74.09061°W

Information
- Type: Public high school
- Established: 1961
- School district: Monmouth Regional High School District
- NCES School ID: 341044004026
- Faculty: 89.9 FTEs
- Grades: 9-12
- Enrollment: 891 (as of 2024–25)
- Student to teacher ratio: 9.9:1
- Colors: Black white and gold
- Athletics conference: Shore Conference
- Team name: Falcons
- Accreditation: Middle States Association of Colleges and Schools
- Publication: The Falconaire

Monmouth Regional High School is a regional, four-year public high school and public school district based in Tinton Falls, Monmouth County, New Jersey, United States, that serves students in ninth through twelfth grades from Eatontown, Shrewsbury Township and Tinton Falls. The school has been accredited by the Middle States Association of Colleges and Schools Commission on Elementary and Secondary Schools since 1967; the school's accreditation expires in January 2025. The school is the district's only high school facility.

As of the 2024–25 school year, the school had an enrollment of 891 students and 89.9 classroom teachers (on an FTE basis), for a student–teacher ratio of 9.9:1. There were 261 students (29.3% of enrollment) eligible for free lunch and 53 (5.9% of students) eligible for reduced-cost lunch.

== History ==
The high school had served students from the military installation of Naval Weapons Station Earle until the start of the 2016–17 school year, when they started attending Colts Neck High School, as part of a sending/receiving relationship with the Freehold Regional High School District.

The district had been classified by the New Jersey Department of Education as being in District Factor Group "GH", the third-highest of eight groupings. District Factor Groups organize districts statewide to allow comparison by common socioeconomic characteristics of the local districts. From lowest socioeconomic status to highest, the categories are A, B, CD, DE, FG, GH, I and J.

== Awards, recognition and rankings ==
The school was the 123rd-ranked public high school in New Jersey out of 339 schools statewide in New Jersey Monthly magazine's September 2014 cover story on the state's "Top Public High Schools", using a new ranking methodology. The school had been ranked 129th in the state of 328 schools in 2012, after being ranked 177th in 2010 out of 322 schools listed. The magazine ranked the school 133rd in 2008 out of 316 schools. The school was ranked 118th in the magazine's September 2006 issue, which surveyed 316 schools across the state.

Schooldigger.com ranked the school as tied for 236th out of 376 public high schools statewide in its 2010 rankings (a decrease of 17 positions from the 2009 rank) which were based on the combined percentage of students classified as proficient or above proficient on the language arts literacy and mathematics components of the High School Proficiency Assessment (HSPA).

In its 2013 report on "America's Best High Schools", The Daily Beast ranked the school 1537th in the nation among participating public high schools and 88th among schools in New Jersey.

== School ==
The high school is approved by the New Jersey Department of Education.

Special systems are in place to service the needs of youngsters from the transient military population.

52% of the professional staff hold advanced degrees. Monmouth Regional High School classroom teachers have an average of 12 years of teaching experience. The school has a 16 to 1 student to teacher ratio.

== Curriculum ==
Advanced Placement (AP) courses are offered in AP Art History, AP Biology, AP Calculus, AP Chemistry, AP Computer Science, AP English Language and Composition, AP French Language, AP Latin Literature, AP Spanish Language, AP United States History, AP Psychology, AP United States Government and Politics and AP European History. Honors level courses are offered in the five academic disciplines and in advanced elective offerings in the applied technology area. Articulated programs with Brookdale Community College and Ramapo College make it possible for students to earn college credits while in high school. "Futures", a competitive elective program for the Gifted, is designed to develop students' critical thinking and problem solving abilities. Students also have the Opportunity to take part in research opportunities, such as the Waksman Institute at Rutgers University.

In addition to passing the High School Proficiency Assessment (HSPA), all graduates must successfully complete a minimum of 120 credits, including four years each of English and Physical Education / Health, three years of Mathematics, three years of Science, 2 years of U.S. History, one year of World History, one year of a foreign language and two years of Fine / Performing / Practical Arts.

== Athletics ==
The Monmouth Regional High School Falcons compete in Division A Central of the Shore Conference, an athletic conference comprised of public and private high schools in Monmouth and Ocean counties along the Jersey Shore. The conference operates under the jurisdiction of the New Jersey State Interscholastic Athletic Association (NJSIAA). With 730 students in grades 10-12, the school was classified by the NJSIAA for the 2019–20 school year as Group II for most athletic competition purposes, which included schools with an enrollment of 486 to 758 students in that grade range. The school was classified by the NJSIAA as Group II South for football for 2024–2026, which included schools with 514 to 685 students.

The school participates with Shore Regional High School in a joint ice hockey team in which Ocean Township High School is the host school / lead agency. The co-op program operates under agreements scheduled to expire in June 2028.

The boys' soccer team won the Group III state championship in 1965, defeating Vailsburg High School by a score of 3-1 in the tournament final.

The boys track team won the indoor track state championship in Group III in 1974, 1979, 1989 (as co-champion) and 2006, and in Group II in 1988 (as co-champion) and 2007; the program's six state titles are tied for 11th-most in the state. The girls team won the Group II title in 1985, and won the Group III title in 1900, 1991.

The boys track team won the Group III spring / outdoor track state championship in 1974, 1978-1980, 2006 and 2007 (as co-champion).

The boys' track team won the Group III indoor relay championships in 1978, 1979 and 1980; the girls' team won the indoor relay title in 1988 in Group II and were co-champions in Group III in 1989.

The boys' track team won the winter track Meet of Champions in 1979.

The girls' spring track team was the Group II state champion in 1985-1989 and won the Group III title in 1990. The program's six state titles are tied for tenth in the state.

The 2005 girls' basketball team won the Central, Group III sectional title over Willingboro High School with a 69–52 win in the finals.

The 2005 baseball team won the 2005 Central, Group III sectional championship with an 11–1 win over Manchester Township High School in the first round, 10–0 over Ewing High School in the semis and a 6–0 shutout over Ocean Township High School in the finals. The team went on to win the 2005 Group III state championship, defeating Ramapo High School by a score of 3–1 in the tournament final.

The boys' basketball team won the 2007 Central, Group III state sectional championship with a 52–48 win against Hightstown High School.

The 2007 boys indoor track team won every title possible, the 4x400 team was crowned group III and overall state champions, as well as winning the Group III outdoor title with a meet record time of 3:15.04.

== Notable alumni ==
- Marcia Bernicat (born 1953), American diplomat who is Director General of the Foreign Service
- Eugene H. Black III (born 1964), retired United States Navy vice admiral and career surface warfare officer
- Kathy Flores (1955–2021), rugby union player who was the head coach of the U.S. women's national team until January 2011
- Milton Goode (born 1960), retired high jumper who represented the United States at the 1984 Summer Olympics in Los Angeles, having first learned the high jump at Monmouth Regional
- Maggie Hogan (born 1979), canoe sprinter and former collegiate swimmer who is a member of the U.S. National Canoe and Kayak Team
- Ranya Senhaji (born 2002), footballer who plays as a forward for the South Carolina Gamecocks and the Morocco women's national team
- Cindy Lee Van Dover (born 1954), oceanographer
- Quentin Wheeler (born 1955, class of 1974), track and field athlete who came in fourth in the 400 metres hurdles at the 1976 Summer Olympics
- Bill Winters (born 1954), former professional football offensive lineman who played in the National Football League, Canadian Football League, American Football Association and United States Football League for eight seasons during the 1970s and 1980s

== Administration ==
Members of the school administration are:

- Brian Evans, superintendent
- Lori Youngclaus, business administrator and board secretary

== Board of education ==
The district's board of education, comprised of nine members, sets policy and oversees the fiscal and educational operation of the district through its administration. As a Type II school district, the board's trustees are elected directly by voters to serve three-year terms of office on a staggered basis, with three seats up for election each year held (since 2012) as part of the November general election. The board appoints a superintendent to oversee the district's day-to-day operations and a business administrator to supervise the business functions of the district. Seats on the board of education are allocated based on the population of the constituent municipalities, with five seats allocated to Tinton Falls, three to Eatontown and one to Shrewsbury Township.
