= Wimpy Winther =

American football player (1947-2024)

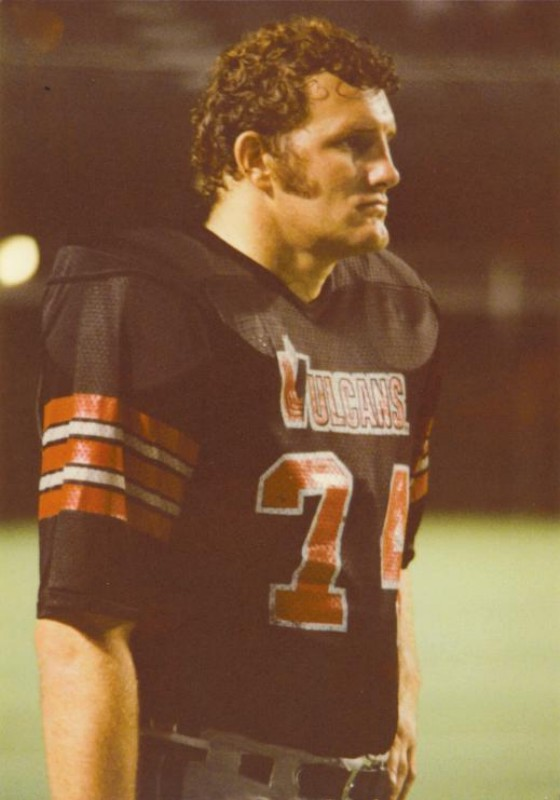
- Winther while playing for the Alabama Vulcans

No. 54, 68, 74
- Position: Center

Personal information
- Born: October 22, 1947; Charles City, Iowa, U.S.
- Died: June 26, 2024 (aged 76); Birmingham, Alabama, U.S.
- Listed height: 6 ft 5 in (1.96 m)
- Listed weight: 261 lb (118 kg)

Career information
- High school: Biloxi (MS)
- College: Mississippi
- NFL draft: 1971: 4th round, 88th overall pick

Career history
- Green Bay Packers (1971); New Orleans Saints (1972); Alabama Vulcans (1979)

Career NFL statistics
- Games played: 16
- Stats at Pro Football Reference

Richard Lew "Wimpy" Winther (October 22, 1947 – June 26, 2024) was an American professional football center in the National Football League (NFL). He was selected by the New Orleans Saints in the fourth round of the 1971 NFL draft and played that season with the Green Bay Packers. The following season, he would play with the Saints.

Richard, nicknamed Wimpy, was married to Sandra Winther. He was the father of three children. After his professional football career ended, Wimpy spent a short period of time in banking. Afterwards, he began teaching and coaching at Shelby County High School in Shelby County, Alabama. Later on, he transferred to Rudd Middle School in Pinson, Alabama, where he taught health and education and coached various sports including football, wrestling, baseball and basketball. After 19 years at Rudd Middle School, Wimpy retired at the early age of 61.

Winther died at age 76 in Birmingham, Alabama.
