= Ranya Senhaji =

Moroccan footballer

Personal information
- Date of birth: 21 April 2002 (age 24)
- Place of birth: Tinton Falls, New Jersey, United States
- Height: 1.73 m (5 ft 8 in)
- Position: Forward

Youth career
- Monmouth Falcons

College career
Years	Team	Apps	(Gls)
2020–2021	South Carolina Gamecocks	32	(2)
2022–2023	Michigan State Spartans	34	(3)

International career^{‡}
2021–	Morocco	2	(2)
- ‡ National team caps and goals as of 14 June 2021.

Ranya Senhaji (Arabic: رانيا الصنهاجي; born 21 April 2002) is a footballer who plays as a forward. Born in the United States, she plays for the Morocco national team.

== Early life ==
Senhaji was raised in Tinton Falls, New Jersey to a Moroccan father and an American mother. She credits her friends, Lindsay and Payton as well.

== High school and college career ==
Senhaji attended Monmouth Regional High School in her hometown. She holds the record for goals in a season at her high school with 30, as well as the career goals record with 58.

She began her college career at the University of South Carolina in Columbia, South Carolina. In her freshman season, she played in 14 of 16 matches, scoring two goals. She appeared in 18 games during the 2021 season.

Senhaji continued her college career at Michigan State University for the 2022 season. She appeared in 13 games during her first season with the Spartans, scoring one goal and providing three assists. She remains at MSU for the 2023 season.

== International career ==
Senhaji made her senior debut for Morocco on 10 June 2021 as a substitution in a 3–0 friendly home win over Mali. She scored her first two international goals four days later against the same opponent.

== See also ==
- List of Morocco women's international footballers
