= Scott Stamper (American football) =

American football player (born 1959)

No. 30
- Position: Running back

Personal information
- Born: December 29, 1959 (age 66); Dayton, Ohio, U.S.
- Listed height: 5 ft 10 in (1.78 m)
- Listed weight: 235 lb (107 kg)

Career information
- High school: Thunderbird (Phoenix, Arizona)
- College: Fort Lewis

Career history
- Denver Gold (1983); San Antonio Gunslingers (1984–1985)

Donald Scott Stamper (born December 29, 1959) is an American former football running back. He played for the San Antonio Gunslingers in the United States Football League. He played college football at Fort Lewis College and was inducted into the college's hall of fame in 1996.
