= Jane Usher =

Jane Ellison Usher served as the President of the Los Angeles City Planning Commission from October 2005 until her resignation in December 2008. She was appointed to the City Planning Commission by Los Angeles Mayor Antonio Villaraigosa. From 1989 until 1993, Ms. Usher served as counsel to the mayor under Los Angeles Mayor Tom Bradley. She had previously worked for the 1984 Summer Olympics in Los Angeles and as a senior advisor to City Attorney Carmen Trutanich from 2009 to 2013.

== Biography and Summary ==
Jane Usher began her career as an attorney in 1980 with the Los Angeles law firm then known as Manatt, Phelps, Rothenberg & Tunney. On leave from the firm, she later served as the Associate General Counsel to the 1984 Summer Olympics, and General Counsel to the United States Football League, the Association of Volleyball Professionals, and the America's Cup. Usher joined the staff of Mayor Tom Bradley as his counsel, policy advocate, and speechwriter. She was also his liaison to the Los Angeles City Attorney and the City Ethics Commission. For two years, Usher sat as Mayor Bradley's alternate on the transportation authority for the county of Los Angeles, and guided his merger of the former Los Angeles County Transportation Commission and the Southern California Rapid Transit District into the Los Angeles County Metropolitan Transportation Authority. Following the Mayor's retirement, Usher became the Assistant Dean of the USC Annenberg School for Communication.

Usher is a former president of Windsor Square and a current board member of the Greater Wilshire Neighborhood Council. Her primary volunteer commitments past and present include to the Harvard-Westlake School, the Center for Early Education, Brown University, which are the schools her two sons Samuel and Jackson Usher attended, and TreePeople. Usher served on the founding board of Mayor Villaraigosa's Million Tree Initiative. Ms. Usher is a member of Wilshire Boulevard Temple. She is the widow of Harry Usher, also a lawyer and the chief operating officer of the 1984 Summer Olympics. During her term on the City Planning Commission, Ms. Usher authored Do Real Planning, the first-ever policy statement issued by this body. As Commission President, she championed smart growth, elegant density, mixed uses, affordable housing, and the end of visual blight and mansionization. Usher garnered fans among the residential neighborhoods of Los Angeles and critics among supporters of the density bonus ordinance as enacted by the City in 2008.

In the 2009 municipal elections, Usher played an active role in the campaign of City Attorney candidate Carmen Trutanich. After Trutanich's victory, Usher was appointed Executive Director of the Trutanich transition and was then offered a senior post in the City Attorney's office where she served until 2013.
