= Ralph Williams (American football) =

American football player (born 1958)

No. 68, 64, 71, 69, 79
- Positions: Guard, tackle

Personal information
- Born: March 27, 1958 (age 68); Monroe, Louisiana, U.S.
- Listed height: 6 ft 3 in (1.91 m)
- Listed weight: 280 lb (127 kg)

Career information
- High school: West Monroe (West Monroe, Louisiana)
- College: Southern (1977–1980)
- NFL draft: 1981: undrafted

Career history
- Houston Oilers (1981–1983); San Antonio Gunslingers (1984–1985); New Orleans Saints (1985–1986)
- Stats at Pro Football Reference

Ralph Williams (born March 27, 1958) is an American former professional football offensive lineman who played four seasons in the National Football League (NFL) with the Houston Oilers and New Orleans Saints. He played college football at Southern University. He was also member of the San Antonio Gunslingers of the United States Football League (USFL).

== Early life and college ==
Ralph Williams was born on March 27, 1958, in Monroe, Louisiana. He attended West Monroe High School in West Monroe, Louisiana.

He was a member of the Southern Jaguars from 1977 to 1980.

== Professional career ==
After going undrafted in the 1981 NFL draft, Williams signed with the Houston Oilers on May 16, 1981. He was placed on injured reserve on August 31 and spent the entire 1981 season there. He played in seven games, starting five, for the Oilers as a left guard in 1982. He was released on August 29, 1983. He was re-signed by the team on September 21 and appeared in one game that season at guard before being released again on October 17, 1983.

Williams started all 18 games at right tackle for the San Antonio Gunslingers of the United States Football League (USFL) during the 1984 USFL season. He again played in all 18 games for the Gunslingers as a right tackle in 1985.

Williams was signed by the New Orleans Saints on July 30, 1985. He played in all 16 games, starting 14, at right guard for the Saints during the 1985 season. He played in six games, all starts, in 1986 as a right guard before being placed on injured reserve on October 18, 1986. He was released by the Saints on September 7, 1987.
