= Mike Ulmer =

American gridiron football player (born 1954)

No. 43, 32
- Position: Safety

Personal information
- Born: December 28, 1954 (age 71); York, Nebraska, U.S.
- Listed height: 6 ft 0 in (1.83 m)
- Listed weight: 196 lb (89 kg)

Career information
- High school: Clay Center
- College: Doane
- NFL draft: 1978: undrafted

Career history
- Chicago Bears (1978); San Francisco 49ers (1979)*; Chicago Bears (1980); Calgary Stampeders (1981); San Antonio Gunslingers (1984–1985); Philadelphia Eagles (1987)
- * Offseason or practice squad member only
- Stats at Pro Football Reference

Michael Walter Ulmer (born December 28, 1954) is an American former professional football player who was a defensive back for the Chicago Bears and Philadelphia Eagles of the National Football League (NFL). He played college football for the Doane Tigers.
