= Cement, Oklahoma =

Town in Oklahoma, US

- Town
- Flag Seal

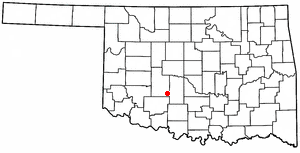
- Location of Cement, Oklahoma
- Coordinates: 34°56′10″N 98°08′11″W
- Country: United States
- State: Oklahoma
- County: Caddo

Area
  - Total: 0.48 sq mi (1.25 km^{2})
  - Land: 0.48 sq mi (1.25 km^{2})
  - Water: 0 sq mi (0.00 km^{2})
- Elevation: 1,529 ft (466 m)

Population (2020)
  - Total: 436
  - Density: 901.1/sq mi (347.92/km^{2})
- Time zone: UTC-6 (Central (CST))
  - Summer (DST): UTC-5 (CDT)
- ZIP code: 73017
- Area codes: 405/572
- FIPS code: 40-13000
- GNIS feature ID: 2413185
- Website: www.cementoklahoma.com

Cement is a town in Caddo County, Oklahoma, United States. The population was 436 as of the 2020 United States census.

The community was named for its early cement industry.

== Geography ==
Cement is located near the southeast corner of Caddo County. U.S. Route 277 passes through the town, leading east then north 18 miles (29 km) to Chickasha and southwest 31 miles (50 km) to Lawton. Oklahoma City is 60 miles (97 km) to the northeast via US-277 and Interstate 44.

According to the United States Census Bureau, Cement has a total area of 0.46 square miles (1.2 km^{2}), all land.

== Demographics ==
Historical population
Census	Pop.	Note	%±
1910	770		—
1920	1,098		42.6%
1930	1,117		1.7%
1940	1,039		−7.0%
1950	1,076		3.6%
1960	959		−10.9%
1970	892		−7.0%
1980	884		−0.9%
1990	642		−27.4%
2000	530		−17.4%
2010	501		−5.5%
2020	436		−13.0%
U.S. Decennial Census

=== 2020 census ===
As of the 2020 census, Cement had a population of 436. The median age was 43.0 years. 22.2% of residents were under the age of 18 and 21.8% of residents were 65 years of age or older. For every 100 females there were 100.9 males, and for every 100 females age 18 and over there were 97.1 males age 18 and over.

0.0% of residents lived in urban areas, while 100.0% lived in rural areas.

There were 187 households in Cement, of which 27.8% had children under the age of 18 living in them. Of all households, 40.6% were married-couple households, 23.5% were households with a male householder and no spouse or partner present, and 31.0% were households with a female householder and no spouse or partner present. About 34.7% of all households were made up of individuals and 19.8% had someone living alone who was 65 years of age or older.

There were 241 housing units, of which 22.4% were vacant. The homeowner vacancy rate was 3.8% and the rental vacancy rate was 11.0%.

Racial composition as of the 2020 census
Race	Number	Percent
White	350	80.3%
Black or African American	5	1.1%
American Indian and Alaska Native	35	8.0%
Asian	0	0.0%
Native Hawaiian and Other Pacific Islander	0	0.0%
Some other race	10	2.3%
Two or more races	36	8.3%
Hispanic or Latino (of any race)	25	5.7%

=== 2000 census ===
As of the census of 2000, there were 530 people, 222 households, and 148 families residing in the town. The population density was 1,173.1 inhabitants per square mile (452.9/km^{2}). There were 284 housing units at an average density of 628.6 per square mile (242.7/km^{2}). The racial makeup of the town was 86.98% White, 2.64% African American, 8.11% Native American, 0.19% Asian, 0.38% from other races, and 1.70% from two or more races. Hispanic or Latino of any race were 1.89% of the population.

There were 222 households, out of which 28.8% had children under the age of 18 living with them, 53.6% were married couples living together, 11.3% had a female householder with no husband present, and 33.3% were non-families. 29.3% of all households were made up of individuals, and 13.5% had someone living alone who was 65 years of age or older. The average household size was 2.39 and the average family size was 2.96.

In the town, the population was spread out, with 26.0% under the age of 18, 6.8% from 18 to 24, 26.6% from 25 to 44, 24.3% from 45 to 64, and 16.2% who were 65 years of age or older. The median age was 39 years. For every 100 females, there were 87.9 males. For every 100 females age 18 and over, there were 85.8 males.

The median income for a household in the town was $18,625, and the median income for a family was $23,500. Males had a median income of $24,531 versus $17,031 for females. The per capita income for the town was $11,378. About 24.6% of families and 27.2% of the population were below the poverty line, including 35.3% of those under age 18 and 24.7% of those age 65 or over.

== Notable people ==
- Blackbear Bosin (1921-1980), Kiowa/Comanche American artist and sculptor, was born and raised near here.
- Clinton Manges (1923–2010), Texas oilman
