= Legion Field =

Stadium in Birmingham, Alabama, United States

- "Football Capital of the South" "Old Gray Lady"
- Aerial view in 2026

- Location in Alabama Location in the United States
- Location: 400 Graymont Avenue West; Birmingham, Alabama
- Coordinates: 33°30′41″N 86°50′34″W
- Owner: City of Birmingham
- Capacity: 71,594
- Surface: FieldTurf (2006–present); AstroTurf (1975–1994); Poly-Turf (1970–1974); Natural grass (1927–1969, 1995–2005)
- Record attendance: 83,183 (United States vs. Argentina, 1996 Olympic soccer)

Construction
- Groundbreaking: 1926
- Opened: November 19, 1927
- Renovated: 1961, 1965, 2005, 2015
- Expanded: 1934, 1948, 1961, 1965, 1977, 1991
- Cost: $439,000 (7.82 million in 2024)
- Architect: D.O. Whilldin

Tenants
- Alabama Crimson Tide (alternate site) (NCAA) (1927–2003); Birmingham–Southern Panthers (NCAA) (1927–1939); Samford Bulldogs (NCAA) (1927–1944); Auburn Tigers (alternate site) (NCAA) (1928–1991); Magic City Classic (NCAA) (1946–present); Iron Bowl (NCAA) (1948–1988, 1990–1992, 1994, 1996, 1998); Dixie Bowl (NCAA) (1948–1949); All-American Bowl (NCAA) (1977–1990); UAB Blazers (NCAA) (1991–2014, 2017–2020); SEC Championship Game (NCAA) (1992–1993); Birmingham Bowl (NCAA) (2006–2020); Birmingham Americans (WFL) (1974); Birmingham Vulcans (WFL) (1975); Alabama Vulcans (AFA) (1979); Birmingham Stallions (USFL) (1983–1985, 2022); Birmingham Fire (WLAF) (1991–1992); Birmingham Barracudas (CFL) (1995); Birmingham Thunderbolts (XFL) (2001); Birmingham Iron (AAF) (2019); USFL (2022)

Website
- birminghamal.gov/legion-field

Alabama Register of Landmarks and Heritage
- Designated: June 14, 2018

Legion Field is an outdoor stadium in the southeastern United States in Birmingham, Alabama, primarily designed to be used as a venue for American football, but occasionally used for other large outdoor events. Opened in 1927, it is named in honor of the American Legion, a U.S. organization of military veterans.

The stadium served as the primary venue for Alabama Crimson Tide home games until the late 1990s and was for many years the site of the annual Iron Bowl rivalry game against Auburn. The UAB football team played at Legion Field from their inception in 1991 through the 2020 season. It has also hosted teams from various professional football leagues.

Since the removal of its east-side upper deck in 2005, Legion Field has a seating capacity of approximately 71,594. At its peak, it seated 83,091 for football and had the name "Football Capital of the South" emblazoned from the facade on the upper deck. Legion Field is colloquially called "The Old Gray Lady" and "The Gray Lady on Graymont".

== Stadium history ==
Construction of a 21,000-seat stadium began in 1926 at the cost of $439,000. It was completed in 1927 and named Legion Field as a war memorial in honor of the recently established American Legion. In the stadium's first event, 16,800 fans watched Howard College (now known as Samford University) shut out Birmingham–Southern College 9–0 on November 19, 1927.

Over the years, the stadium grew. The expansions didn't follow the designer's initial intent on the stadium becoming a monumental horseshoe-shaped amphitheater. Capacity was increased to 25,000 in 1934 and to 45,000 in 1948, and the bowl was enclosed. In 1961, a 9,000 seat upper deck was added to the east side of the stadium, increasing capacity to 54,600. In 1965, a new press box was built in the stadium and capacity was further increased to 68,821. The first nationally televised night college football game at Legion Field was between Ole Miss and Alabama on October 4, 1969.

In 1970, the natural grass turf was replaced with Poly-Turf, which was in turn replaced by AstroTurf in 1975. Seating capacity was increased to 75,808 in 1977 and further increased to 83,091 in 1991. The turf was changed back to a natural Bermuda grass surface in 1995 in order to host soccer events for the Summer Olympics in Atlanta. In 2006, the field went back to an artificial surface with infilled FieldTurf. The field has a conventional north–south alignment at an approximate elevation of 570 feet (170 m) above sea level.

In 2004, a structural evaluation determined that the 9,000 seat upper deck would need major remediation to meet modern building codes. With little prospect of adequate repairs on the way, the University of Alabama withdrew the few home games it still scheduled for Birmingham. The city removed the upper deck in 2005 since the capacity was greater than the need for its tenants. In 2015, renovations took place including general improvements and overall renovations including a new and larger video scoreboard along with a new and improved sound system.

The stadium's future beyond the 2020 college football season is uncertain. The Birmingham–Jefferson Civic Center Authority started construction of a new stadium on the Birmingham–Jefferson Convention Complex grounds in July 2019. UAB football moved into the new 47,000-seat Protective Stadium, in 2021.

== College football ==
=== UAB Blazers ===
Legion Field served as the home field of the UAB Blazers, members of Conference USA, from 1991 to 2020. The Blazers temporarily left Legion Field without a primary tenant during the school's two-year hiatus from football. The Blazers returned to Legion Field for the first time in two years on September 2, 2017, setting a new attendance record in a 38–7 victory over Alabama A&M.

=== Iron Bowl ===
Legion Field was well known for hosting the regular season-ending rivalry between Alabama and Auburn each year from 1948 to 1988. Because of Birmingham's major industry of iron and steel manufacturing, the game became known as the "Iron Bowl." From the series' resumption in 1948 to 1987, each team rotated claiming home-field rights, with Alabama as the nominal home team in even-numbered years and Auburn as the nominal home team in odd-numbered years (the Tigers occupied the west sideline and the Crimson Tide the east sideline beginning in the late 1950s, regardless of which squad the designated home team). Tickets were split equally between the two athletic departments to sell, similar to other rivalries like the Red River Shootout between Oklahoma and Texas or the World's Largest Outdoor Cocktail Party between Georgia and Florida.

For many years, the Iron Bowl was played in Birmingham more or less out of necessity. Neither Alabama's Bryant-Denny Stadium nor Auburn's Jordan-Hare Stadium were nearly large enough to accommodate the large crowds that attended the game even in the 1950s. Additionally, Birmingham was much more accessible to the rest of the state well into the 1970s.

By the 1980s, Jordan-Hare Stadium had expanded to seat over 80,000 people. Combined with Legion Field's decades-long association with Alabama football (see below), this led Auburn fans to lobby for making the Iron Bowl a home-and-home series, or at the very least allow Auburn to move its home games to Jordan-Hare. At the time, Alabama was Auburn's only major rival to have never played a game on the Plains. Ultimately, in 1989, Auburn moved its home games in the series to Jordan-Hare. Thus, tickets for games held at Legion Field were no longer split equally. Auburn did host an Iron Bowl home game at Legion Field in 1991, but since then all Iron Bowls have been played at Auburn in odd-numbered years. In 2000, Alabama followed suit and decided to no longer play its home games against Auburn at Legion Field. Alabama holds a 32–15 advantage over Auburn in games played at Legion Field.

=== Other Alabama and Auburn football games ===
Alabama and Auburn used Legion Field as an alternate home stadium for much of the 20th century. At its height, Legion Field seated over 20,000 more people than Alabama's Bryant-Denny Stadium and Auburn's Jordan-Hare Stadium, making it a natural choice for games likely to attract large crowds. Between its use for the Iron Bowl and as an alternate home stadium for the Crimson Tide and Tigers, Legion Field played host to many of the most important football games in Alabama's history.

Well into the 1980s, Alabama played most of its important games, as well as the Iron Bowl, at Legion Field—to the point that most of Alabama's "home" football history from the 1920s to the 1980s took place in Birmingham. In addition to the larger capacity, Birmingham was more accessible than Tuscaloosa for much of the 20th century—even though Tuscaloosa is only 45 minutes west of Birmingham. The Crimson Tide hosted Tennessee in odd-numbered years in Birmingham through 1997, and hosted LSU in even-numbered years from 1964 through 1986, except for 1980. Well into the 1990s, Alabama usually played anywhere from three to four home games a year at Legion Field. Alabama also played its entire 1987 home schedule at Legion Field due to major renovations at Bryant–Denny Stadium. The stadium's association with Alabama football was so strong that from the 1980s onward, Auburn lobbied to have its home games in the Iron Bowl played in Auburn.

Until 1999, Alabama played at least three games at Legion Field every season. In 1998, Alabama double-decked the east stands at Bryant-Denny, bringing its capacity to a few hundred more seats than that of Legion Field. Due to the disrepair of Legion Field and the added capacity in Tuscaloosa, Alabama moved major conference games on campus. In the ensuing years, Alabama decreased the number of games scheduled in Birmingham. The last home game for Alabama at Legion Field was against the University of South Florida on August 30, 2003. Though Alabama had a couple of games scheduled at Legion Field in 2005 and 2008, the stadium's poor state of repair (see above) led Alabama to end its contract with the city of Birmingham in 2004 and move all home games to Tuscaloosa.

Auburn also used Legion Field for some home games well into the 1970s due to the larger capacity and the difficulty in traveling to Auburn for most of the 20th century. Auburn played all home games against Tennessee at Legion Field until 1978, except in 1974, when the game was played in Auburn. Auburn also played all home games against Georgia Tech at Legion Field until 1970. After 1978, Auburn only ventured to Legion Field for the Iron Bowl. They stopped playing there altogether in 1991, but took part in the Birmingham Bowl at the same stadium in 2015 as a postseason bowl game.

=== Other college football games ===
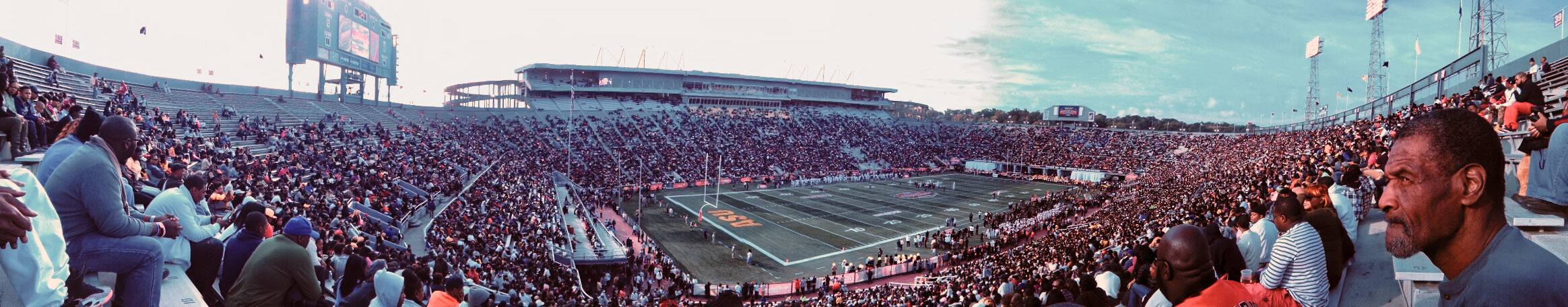
Magic City Classic in Legion Field on October 26, 2013

Legion Field has hosted a number of other college football games. The annual Magic City Classic between Alabama A&M University and Alabama State University has been played here since 1946. The Steel City Classic featuring Miles College and Stillman College is also played at Legion Field. The MEAC/SWAC Challenge was played at Legion Field from 2005 to 2007, but moved to Orlando in 2008.

Birmingham–Southern College played against Mississippi College's junior varsity team in Legion Field on September 6, 2007, in their first football game since 1939.

In terms of postseason play, the Southwestern Athletic Conference used the stadium for their conference championship from 1999 to 2012, but moved to Houston's NRG Stadium in 2013. The Southeastern Conference played their first two conference title games here in 1992 and 1993.

This stadium has also hosted four different bowl games in its history:

- Dixie Bowl (1947–48)
- Hall of Fame Bowl (1977–1985) This game moved to Tampa, Florida in 1986 and was renamed the Outback Bowl in 1995.
- All-American Bowl (1986–1990)
- TicketSmarter Birmingham Bowl (2006–2020)

== Professional football ==
Legion Field has served as the home stadium for various professional football teams in Birmingham. It served as home field for the Birmingham Americans (1974) and Birmingham Vulcans (1975) of the World Football League (1974–1975), the Alabama Vulcans of the American Football Association (1979), the Birmingham Stallions of the United States Football League (1983–1985), and the Birmingham Fire of the World League of American Football (later NFL Europe) in 1991–92. In 1995, it was the home field of the Birmingham Barracudas for their single season of play as part of the short-lived expansion of the Canadian Football League into the United States. In 2001, it was the home field for the single season of the Birmingham Thunderbolts of the XFL. In 2019, it was the home field for the Birmingham Iron of the Alliance of American Football. There have also been at least two NFL preseason games here, on August 8, 1970, when the New York Jets defeated the Buffalo Bills 33–10, and on August 27, 1988, when the Washington Redskins defeated the Atlanta Falcons 34–17.

In 1968, the Boston Patriots of the American Football League played one "home" game against the New York Jets at Legion Field. The Jets, featuring former Alabama quarterback Joe Namath, won the game 47–31.

The inaugural 2022 season of the USFL was played at Protective Stadium and Legion Field. For the 2023 season, Protective Stadium served as the home stadium for the Birmingham Stallions and New Orleans Breakers.

== High school football ==
Legion Field has hosted various high school football games throughout its history. From 1996 until 2008, Legion Field was used by the Alabama High School Athletic Association for the Super Six high school football championships.

In 1974, the Banks Jets defeated the Woodlawn Colonels in front of a record-breaking crowd of over 40,000 at Legion Field. The game would feature future Alabama and NFL players, which included Banks quarterback Jeff Rutledge and Woodlawn running back Tony Nathan.

== Soccer ==
Legion Field has been used as a site for major soccer events, including preliminary matches in the 1996 Summer Olympics—the opening match between the United States and Argentina drew 83,810 spectators, the stadium's all-time record for any event. All of the later-round soccer games moved to Athens, Georgia, after preliminary games had been played in various other cities.

Legion Field has also hosted exhibition games by the U.S. men's and women's national soccer teams. The men's team played a World Cup qualification match against Guatemala at the stadium on March 30, 2005.

When the City of Birmingham changed back to an artificial turf field in 2006, the United States Soccer Federation announced that it would no longer be scheduling men's national team games for Legion Field.

=== 1996 Olympic Soccer Men's tournament matches ===
Date	Time (CDT)	Team #1	Score	Team #2	Round	Attendance
July 20, 1996	6:30 p.m.	United States	1–3	Argentina	Group A	83,183
July 21, 1996	4:00 p.m.	Mexico	1–0	Italy	Group C	44,211
July 22, 1996	6:30 p.m.	United States	2–0	Tunisia	Group A	45,687
July 23, 1996	7:00 p.m.	Mexico	0–0	South Korea	Group C	26,111
July 24, 1996	6:30 p.m.	Argentina	1–1	Tunisia	Group A	16,826
July 25, 1996	8:00 p.m.	Italy	2–1	South Korea	Group C	28,319

=== 1996 Olympic Soccer Women's tournament matches ===
Date	Time (CDT)	Team #1	Score	Team #2	Round	Attendance
July 21, 1996	12:30 p.m.	Germany	3–2	Japan	Group B	44.211
July 23, 1996	3:30 p.m.	Brazil	2–0	Japan	Group B	26.111
July 25, 1996	5:30 p.m.	Brazil	1–1	Germany	Group B	28.319

== Concerts and other events ==
Legion Field has also been used as a concert venue, hosting famous artists of many different genres, including U2, Ruben Studdard, Pink Floyd, and The Rolling Stones.

In 1979 and 1980, the facility played host to the Drum Corps International World Championships.

If Protective Stadium had not been completed in time for the 2022 World Games, that event's opening and closing ceremonies would have been held at Legion Field. It remains in use at least through the World Games, as it served as the venue for flag football.

== Gallery ==
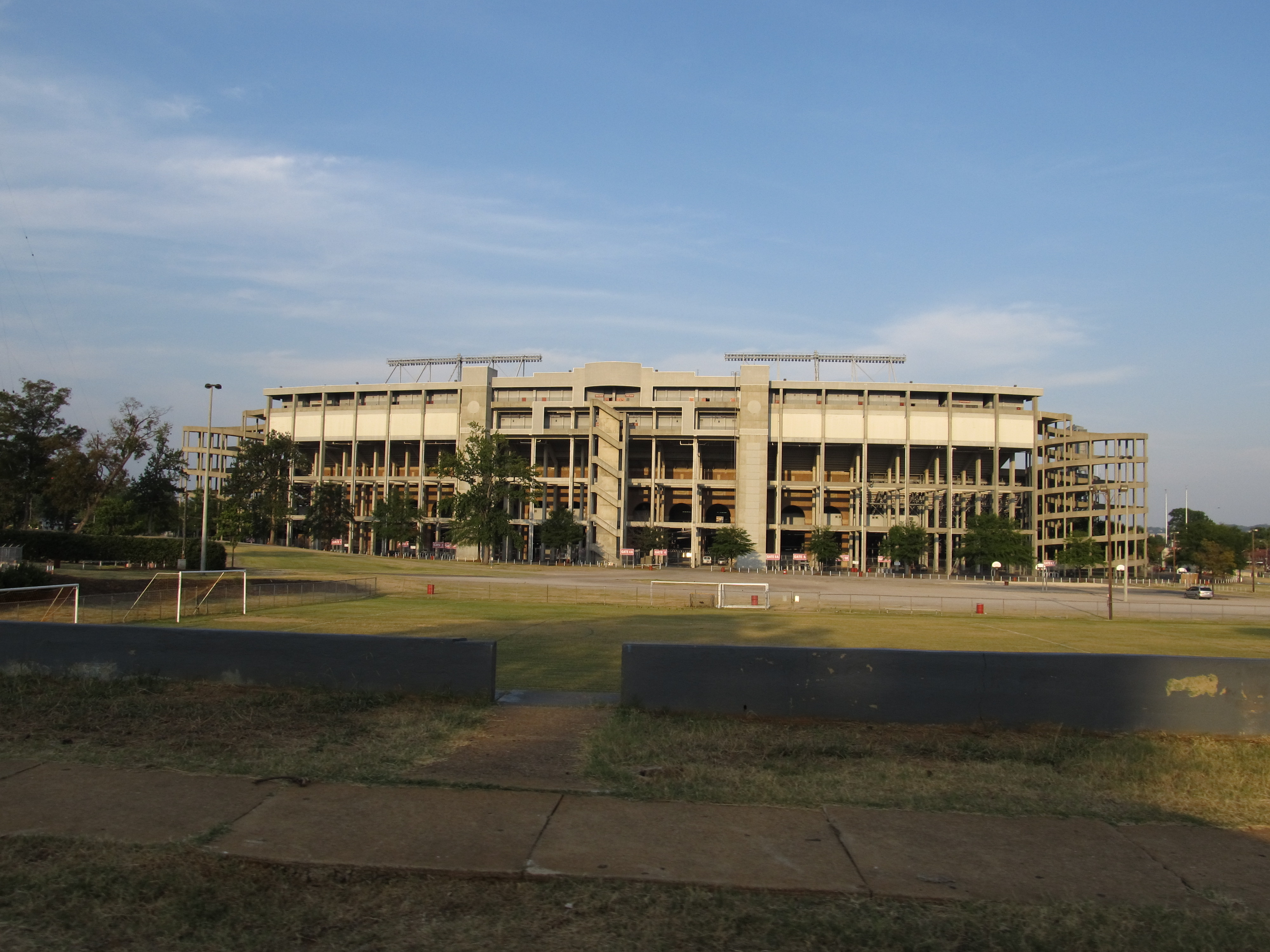
Exterior, from Graymont Avenue

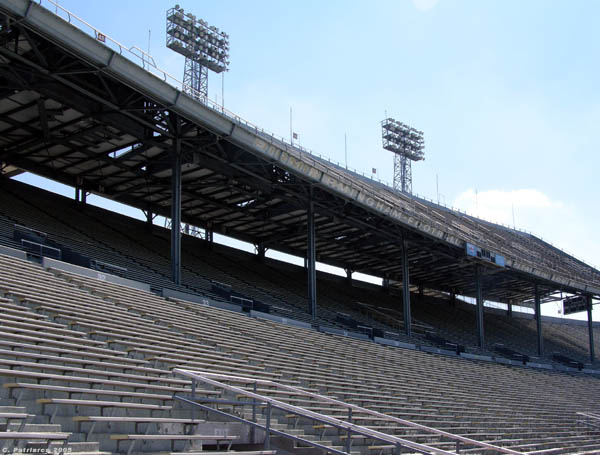
Before the upper deck came down

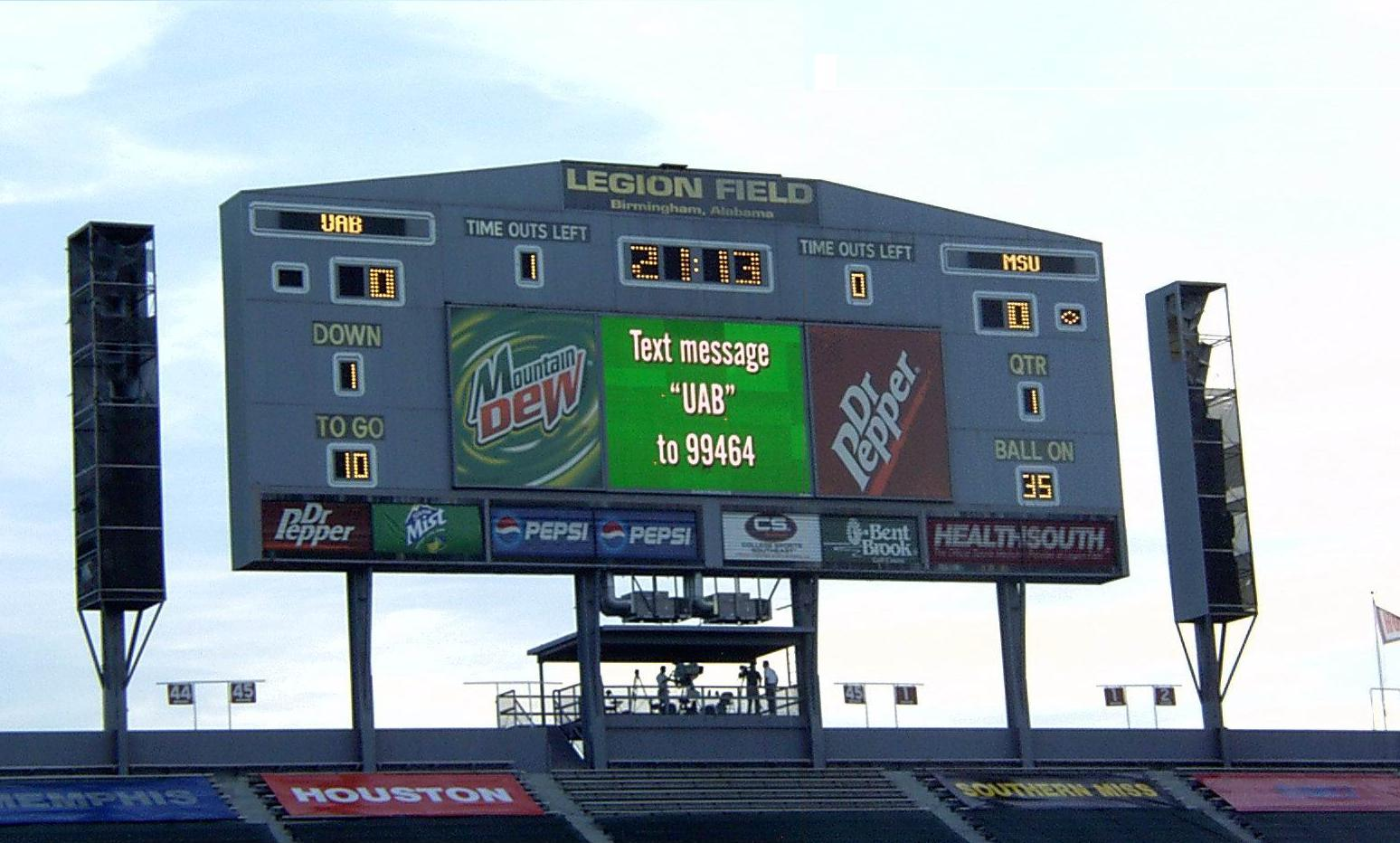
Old scoreboard

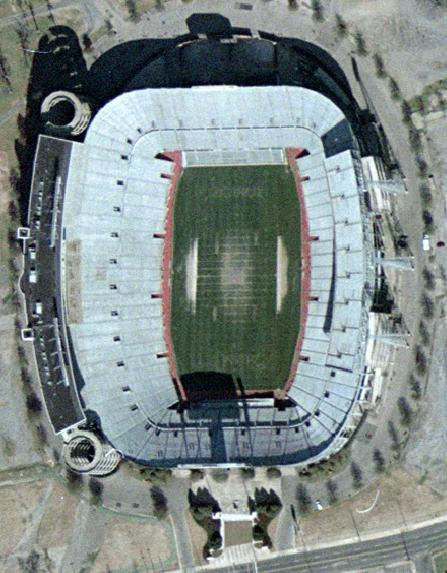
Satellite view, 2004

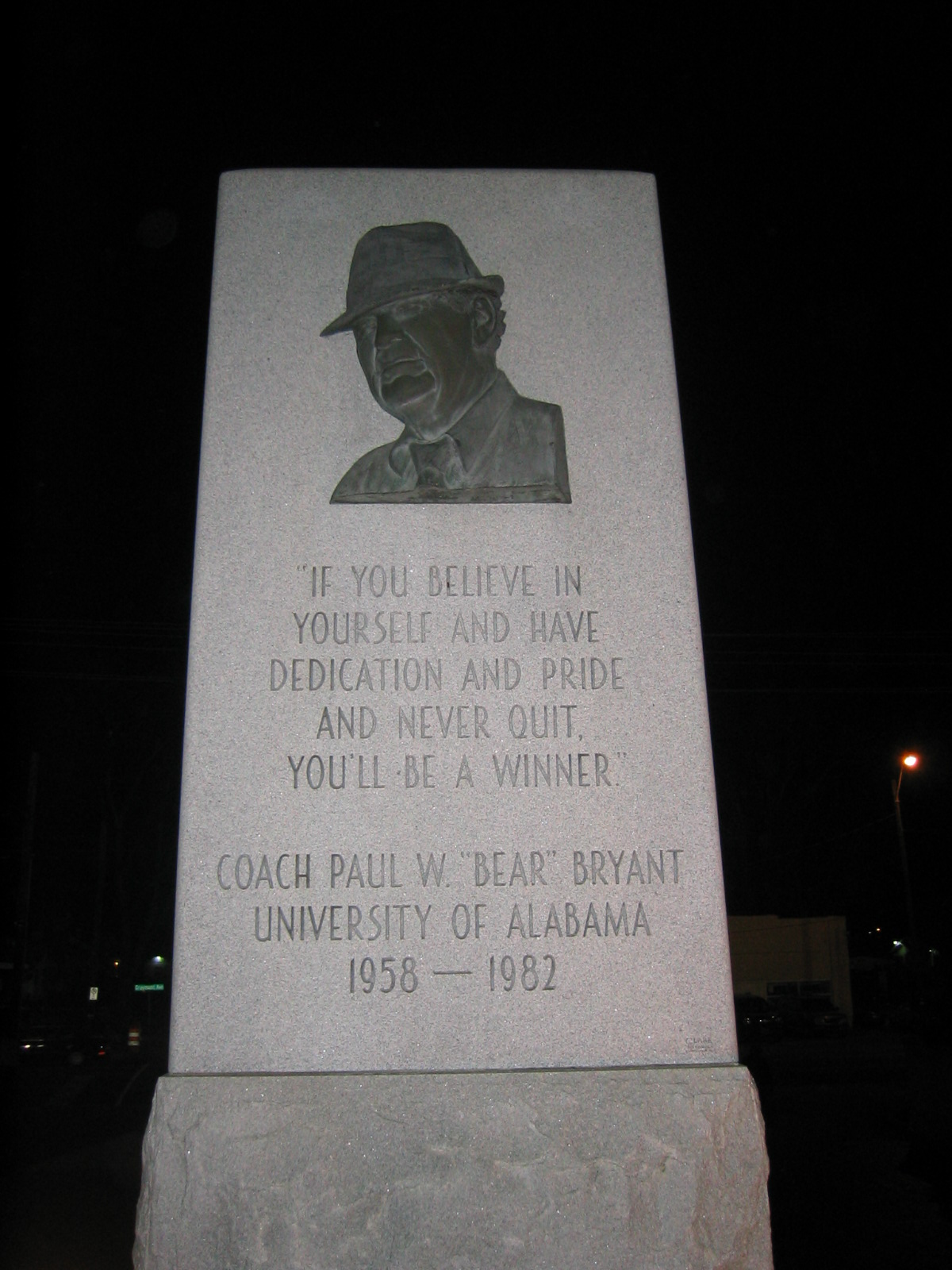
Memorial: "The Bear"

== See also ==
- List of NCAA Division I FBS football stadiums

Events and tenants
Preceded by first stadium	Host of Birmingham Bowl; 2006–2020	Succeeded by Protective Stadium
Preceded by first stadium	Host of SWAC Football Championship Game; 1999–2012	Succeeded by NRG Stadium
Preceded by first stadium	Host of SEC Championship Game; 1992–1993	Succeeded by Georgia Dome
Preceded by first stadium	Host of Dixie Bowl; 1947–1948	Succeeded by defunct
Preceded by first stadium	Host of Hall of Fame (Outback) Bowl; 1977–1985	Succeeded by Tampa Stadium
Preceded by continuation after departure of Hall of Fame (Outback) Bowl	Host of All-American Bowl; 1986–1990	Succeeded by defunct
Preceded by Mile High Stadium	Host of the Drum Corps International; World Championship; 1979–1980	Succeeded by Olympic Stadium (Montreal)
