= Jon Zogg =

American football player (born 1960)

No. 69
- Position: Guard

Personal information
- Born: November 19, 1960 (age 65); San Jose, California, U.S.
- Listed height: 6 ft 4 in (1.93 m)
- Listed weight: 290 lb (132 kg)

Career information
- High school: Watsonville (Watsonville, California)
- College: Boise State
- NFL draft: 1983: undrafted

Career history
- Dallas Cowboys (1983)*; San Antonio Gunslingers (1984-1985); Los Angeles Raiders (1987)
- * Offseason or practice squad member only

Career NFL statistics
- Games played: 1
- Stats at Pro Football Reference

Jon Frederick Zogg (born November 19, 1960) is an American former professional football player who was an offensive guard for one season in the National Football League (NFL) for the Los Angeles Raiders and two for the San Antonio Gunslingers in the United States Football League (USFL). He played college football for the Boise State Broncos and was signed by the Dallas Cowboys as an undrafted free agent in 1983.
