= Jafus White =

American gridiron football player (born 1957)

Profile
- Position: Defensive back

Personal information
- Born: April 16, 1957 (age 69); Cameron, Texas, U.S.

Career information
- NFL draft: 1980: 10th round, 253rd overall pick

Career history
- Green Bay Packers (1980)*; Toronto Argonauts (1981); San Antonio Gunslingers
- * Offseason or practice squad member only

Jafus White (born April 16, 1957, in Cameron, Texas) is an American former football defensive back. He was drafted with the 253rd pick of the 1980 NFL draft in the 10th round by the Green Bay Packers, but never made the roster. His professional career included two games for the Toronto Argonauts of the Canadian Football League (CFL) in 1981, and he also played for the San Antonio Gunslingers of the United States Football League (USFL).
