= Greg Fields (American football) =

American football player (born 1955)

Profile
- Position: Defensive end

Personal information
- Born: January 23, 1955 (age 71)
- Listed height: 6 ft 6 in (1.98 m)
- Listed weight: 260 lb (118 kg)

Career information
- High school: Mission (San Francisco, California)
- College: Grambling State

Career history
- Detroit Lions (1978)*; Baltimore Colts (1979–1981); Atlanta Falcons (1982)*; Los Angeles Express (1983); San Antonio Gunslingers (1984–1985)
- * Offseason or practice squad member only
- Stats at Pro Football Reference

Gregory Keith Fields (born January 23, 1955) is an American former professional football defensive end who played in the National Football League (NFL) and United States Football League (USFL).

== Early life ==
Fields was born and grew up in San Francisco, California and attended Mission High School. He was an All-City selection in football as a junior and senior.

== College career ==
Fields began his career at Hartnell College and was named All-Coast Conference as a sophomore before transferring to Grambling State for his final two years of eligibility.

== Professional career ==
Fields was signed by the Detroit Lions as an undrafted free agent in 1978 but was cut during training camp. He was signed by the Baltimore Colts and spent the 1979 and 1980 seasons playing mostly special teams and as a reserve on the defensive line. Fields was cut by the Colts at the end of training camp in 1981. Fields was signed by the Atlanta Falcons during the 1982 offseason but was cut during training camp. After being cut he locked himself in his hotel room and told Falcons' defensive line coach Jim Stanley that he refused to be released and did not leave training camp until the police were called.

Essentially blackballed from the NFL, Fields was signed by the Los Angeles Express of the newly-formed United States Football League (USFL) in 1983. He finished second on the team with ten sacks during the 1983 season. Fields was cut at the end of training camp in 1984 and assaulted Express head coach John Hadl after being informed of his release. Fields was later signed by the San Antonio Gunslingers, where he played for two seasons until the USFL folded. He recorded 16.5 quarterback sacks in his career at USFL.
