= Clinton Manges =

Oil tycoon

- Born: August 22, 1923; Cement, Oklahoma, US
- Died: September 23, 2010 (aged 87); San Antonio, Texas, US
- Resting place: Hahl Memorial Cemetery, Freer, Texas, US
- Political party: Democratic
- Opponent(s): Mobil, Exxon, Sun Oil, Bill Clements, John Connally, George H. W. Bush, Republicans
- Criminal charges: mail fraud, bribery, conspiracy
- Criminal penalty: fine imprisonment
- Spouse: Ruth Richmond (m. 1946–2010, his death)
- Children: 4
- Military career
- Branch: U.S. Coast Guard
- Rank: Able Seaman

Clinton Manges (August 22, 1923 – September 23, 2010) was a controversial oil tycoon in Texas in the 1970s and 1980s.

Manges was born in Cement, Oklahoma. He began to amass his fortune in South Texas in the early 1970s, when he befriended Lloyd M. Bentsen, Sr., the father of U.S. Senator Lloyd Bentsen, and political boss George Parr, known as the "Duke of Duval." In 1971, Manges bought a 100,000-acre (400 km^{2}) ranch in the county. He was a confidant and close friend of numerous officials, including the late Attorney General Jim Mattox, Garry Mauro and Lt. Gov. Bob Bullock.

Unlike most of his contemporaries, Manges was an open, unashamed liberal. With his large fortune, Manges was soon one of the most prolific supporters of Democratic candidates in Texas. He would often donate $50,000 or more to various statewide campaigns. In contrast, most other Texas oil barons like Eddie Chiles, Bunker and Lamar Hunt, Clint Murchison, and two-time Governor Bill Clements were extremely conservative and supported Republican candidates. Paul Burka of Texas Monthly wrote of Manges in 1984, "By mastering the mysterious ways of South Texas, Clinton Manges has built an empire, amassed political influence, declared war on the state establishment—and left bitter enemies in his wake."

== Personal life ==
Manges was born to migrant farm workers in Cement, Oklahoma. He dropped out of grade school to pick cotton. Later, Manges attended high school in Port Aransas and worked as a shrimper. After serving in the Coast Guard in the World War II era, he moved to the Rio Grande Valley. He met Ruth Richmond, daughter of a prosperous local farmer, and fellow employee at the Rio Theatre in Raymondville; they married in 1946. At age 30, Manges suffered from tuberculosis. In the 1960s he worked in a gas station, where he met and impressed Lloyd Bentsen, Sr.; he subsequently represented Bentsen in his real estate dealings.

Manges did not smoke or drink. He agreed to pay legal expenses of Duval County District Judge O. P. Carillo in his impeachment trial.

Manges owned the Mongoose bowling alley, and later the Mongoose cotton gin. He experienced financial problems in 1961, did not pay debts, and wrote bad checks to the state of Texas. The Small Business Administration foreclosed on the loan with which he started the ginning business. In 1963, he was indicted for making false statements on the application for that loan. He pleaded guilty in 1965 and paid a fine of $2500.

== San Antonio Gunslingers ==
In 1984, Manges persuaded the fledgling United States Football League into granting him an expansion franchise, the San Antonio Gunslingers. In 1983, he had paid to upgrade Alamo Stadium with artificial turf and an all-weather track. Despite–or perhaps, because of–Manges' wealth, the USFL did not require Manges to make an initial capital investment. Instead, he paid for team expenses out-of-pocket as they arose. This practice caught up with him in 1985, when Manges' oil fortune collapsed (though he had been in financial trouble since at least 1980). In the ESPN documentary Small Potatoes - Who Killed the USFL? that first aired on October 20, 2009, former Gunslingers quarterback Rick Neuheisel stated that during that season, the players would often race each other to the bank in order to cash their paychecks. According to Neuheisel, the players knew that the first 50% of the checks deposited were likely to clear, but that the other half would probably bounce.

In June, Manges essentially walked away from the Gunslingers and stopped paying the team's bills, forcing the team to play the last stretch of the season for free. When he refused to make restitution for the team's debts, league commissioner Harry Usher revoked the franchise. The players sued Manges to recover back pay, but that suit collapsed when he declared bankruptcy in 1987. At least some of the players and coaches still had not been paid at the time of a 1998 reunion, and no one owed back pay had been paid at the time of Manges' death.

== Bankruptcy and prison ==
Manges' empire eventually collapsed in 1987. He was convicted on federal charges of bribery and mail fraud in 1995, and after his appeals failed reported to prison in 1997. Charges of conspiracy to bribe the number two official of the Texas General Land Office were dismissed in U.S. district court for lack of federal jurisdiction. He also lost the 100,000-acre (400 km^{2}) he had bought in 1968, Magic Kingdom ranch, to Chapter 11 bankruptcy. In 1991 armed federal marshals arrived at the ranch by Black Hawk helicopter to seize his property.

He died in a nursing home in San Antonio.
