= Joey Hackett =

American football player (born 1958)

No. 81, 82, 85, 89
- Position: Tight end

Personal information
- Born: September 29, 1958 (age 68); Greensboro, North Carolina, U.S.
- Listed height: 6 ft 5 in (1.96 m)
- Listed weight: 267 lb (121 kg)

Career information
- High school: Southern Guilford (Greensboro)
- College: Elon
- NFL draft: 1981: undrafted

Career history
- Dallas Cowboys (1981)*; Washington Redskins (1982)*; New Jersey Generals (1983); San Antonio Gunslingers (1984–1985); Denver Broncos (1986); Green Bay Packers (1987–1988)
- * Offseason or practice squad member only

Career NFL statistics
- Receptions: 4
- Receiving yards: 50
- Touchdowns: 1
- Stats at Pro Football Reference

Joseph Glenn Hackett (born September 29, 1958) is an American former professional football player who was a tight end in the National Football League (NFL).

== Early life ==
Hackett was born on September 29, 1958, in Greensboro, North Carolina.

== College career ==
He played football and baseball at the collegiate level at Elon College and was a two sport All-American in baseball and football.

== Baseball career ==
Hackett was drafted by the St. Louis Cardinals in 1980 and by the Texas Rangers in 1981.

== Football career ==
=== Dallas Cowboys ===
Hackett signed with the Dallas Cowboys in May 1981, but was released on August 24, 1981

=== Washington Redskins ===
As a free agent, he signed with the Washington Redskins on April 2, 1982. The Redskins cut him on June 21, 1982.

=== New Jersey Generals ===
Hackett signed with the New Jersey Generals of the United States Football League (USFL) on November 11, 1982. He was assigned jersey number 82 and spent a significant amount of time on the injured reserve list with a broken hand as well as on the developmental squad. He was activated for game 3 of the 1983 season.

=== San Antonio Gunslingers ===
He was selected by the San Antonio Gunslingers in the 14th round (81st player selected) of the USFL expansion draft on September 6, 1983. He would see extensive playing time for the Gunslingers in 1984 and 1985. In these two seasons, Hackett played in 36 games and had 63 receptions for 946 yards, including eight touchdown receptions. Due to the financial problems that the Gunslingers incurred they released all 46 players on July 22, 1985, just minutes before the deadline to pay the players for two overdue paychecks.

=== Denver Broncos ===
On May 16, 1986, Hackett signed a free agent contract with the Denver Broncos He played in 16 regular season games and in three playoff games, including Super Bowl XXI for the Denver Broncos during their 1986 Season. He returned in 1987, but was released as part of the final roster reductions on September 7, 1987.

=== Green Bay Packers ===
Hackett played for the Green Bay Packers in 1987 and 1988. On Sunday, October 9, 1988, at Milwaukee County Stadium, Hackett would catch his first and only NFL touchdown reception from a two-yard pass thrown by quarterback Don Majkowski in a 45–3 victory against the New England Patriots. In early December 1988, Hackett was placed on the injured reserve list with severe back spasms.

== Personal life ==
After the completion of his athletic career Hackett moved back to his hometown of Pleasant Garden, NC. He married Deborah Maret in 1987 and they have two children. Their son, Jody, born January 27, 1989, went on to play football at Elon University and their daughter, Haley, born May 11, 1990, played basketball at Appalachian State University.

His younger brother Dino Hackett also played in the NFL.
