= Kentucky Trackers =

The Kentucky Trackers were a short-lived team in the American Football Association (1978–1983) from 1979 to 1980, when their franchise was revoked after several rules violations.

The Trackers' roster featured Norm Romagnoli, a linebacker drafted by the Kansas City Chiefs in the 1974 NFL draft, and Dallas Owens, a defensive back drafted by the Dallas Cowboys in the 1978 NFL draft. The Trackers also had several players from Kentucky college teams, such as Dallas Owens, Mike Siganos, Pat Donley, and Gil Foushee from the University of Kentucky; Anthony Miller from Eastern Kentucky University; Charlie Johnson and Keith Tandy from Western Kentucky University. Siganos and Owens were members of the 1977 All-SEC football team. Buddy Pfaadt served as the Trackers' head coach.

The Trackers featured a cheerleading squad and played in Cardinal Stadium in Louisville.
