= K-State Student Union =

- Interactive map of the K-State Student Union area

General information
- Status: Open
- Type: Student union
- Location: 17th & Anderson; Manhattan, Kansas, United States
- Coordinates: 39°11′17.62″N 96°34′57.02″W
- Groundbreaking: 1953
- Opened: September 8, 1956
- Renovated: 1963, 1970, 1998
- Cost: $1.65 million ($19.5 million in 2025 dollars)
- Renovation cost: $900,000 (1963)
- Owner: Kansas State University

Technical details
- Floor area: 270,000 square feet (25,000 m^{2})

Design and construction
- Awards: Top 5 Student Unions in the Nation (1985)

Renovating team
- Renovating firm: Green Construction Company of Manhattan; McPherson Construction Co. of Topeka

Other information
- Parking: Parking Garages

Website
- www.union.k-state.edu

The K-State Student Union is the student activity center at Kansas State University. Built in 1956, the building offers various amenities to K-State students.

== History ==
In 1956, the K-State Student Union was built for the students of Kansas State University. After several decades of students voting in favor of student fees to build such a structure the administration felt obligated to construct a “campus living room” for the students of K-State.

Although the K-State Student Union was opened in 1956, much deliberation had taken place prior. The first consideration to build a student union at K-State began in 1933. At that time Memorial Stadium had started construction and there was discussion to build a student union concurrently, but due to lack of funding, the Union construction plan was cut. In 1935, K-State President Farell appointed a student and faculty committee to research means of building and funding a student union.

On March 11, 1938, the students of the Kansas State Agricultural College (later known as K-State) supported funding of a Union by student fees by 76 percent. The approved fee was $5 per semester and $2.50 for summer session and began charging students in 1941.

Several major events delayed the construction and planning of the Union; World War II, the Korean War and the Flood of 1951. During the flood, Thompson Hall was used as a temporary Union and served as a place of refuge and served meals to those forced out of their homes.

In 1951, President James McCain set the Union as the top priority in new building constructions. A committee of five students and five faculty was appointed to begin the planning process. Two years later the Council for Student Affairs established the Union Governing Board. 1953 also marked the ground breaking for Union construction.

In 1954, student fees were increased to$12.50 per semester. Of the fee, $7.50 went towards bond retirement and $5 was allocated for operations.

Union Governing Board (UGB) held their first meeting on March 15, 1955, one year prior to the opening of the Union.

In December 1955, Union Program Council (UPC) was created and was composed of 114 students.

On March 8, 1956, after many years of hard work and deliberation, the K-State Student Union finally opened. The original building consisted of 110,000 sq ft (10,000 m^{2}). and cost $1.65 million. The Grand Opening theme was “Night at the Circus.” As part of the grand opening banquet, there was a student variety show emceed by K-State student, Gordon Jump (The Maytag Repairman and WKRP).

The K-State Student Union assumes the responsibility for the campus's vending program in October 1960. In 1963 the first addition to the Union is completed adding 40,000 sq ft (3,700 m^{2}). to the building at a cost of $900,000 with no additional student fees. The addition was necessary due to the significant increase in enrollment at K-State. 1970 saw the second addition, adding 100,000 sq ft (9,300 m^{2})., part of which was a Union Bookstore and expansion of the Recreation Center, bring total square footage to 240,000 sq ft (22,000 m^{2}). Total cost of the building cost was $5.4 million (to build a Union this size now, it is estimated that cost would exceed $42 million).

The New York Times recognized the K-State Student Union as one of the top five student Unions in America in April 1986.

In 1991, the Union becomes a tobacco free building and opens Union Station, a non-alcoholic entertainment and food facility. Throughout the rest of the 90s, the Union served as a Red Cross refuge for victims of the Flood of 93, Subway opens in the Recreation area, beer sales begin in the Recreation area, Commerce Bank opens, Union renovation begins, and our name officially changed to K-State Student Union.

In 2000, Friends of the Union was established as the Union Fundraising program, and the first contribution was made by Alpha Delta Pi. Pepsi-Cola was awarded exclusive pouring rights to K-State University and all its entities including the Union. 2000 also welcomed several new openings including, Cats’ Den convenience store, the union Computer Store and Union Hair care (later named Crimpers Too).

== Services ==
Today, the K-State Student Union houses two theater venues, a food court and Subway, a computer store, a bookstore that includes K-State apparel and merchandise, Caribou Coffee, a Recreation Center that includes bowling, billiards and a golf simulator, a full service Commerce bank and also outside bank ATMs, and a convenience store. The K-State Student Union serves as a home to the Union Governing Board and Union Program Council and also serves as a place to host meetings for Greek chapters and outside entities. The Union employs more than 500 people, including students, and provides accommodations for countless programs featuring cultural, social, and recreational entertainment.
