= Alabama Vulcans =

1979 American professional football team

Logo

General information
- Founded: 1979
- Folded: 1979
- Stadium: Legion Field
- Headquartered: Birmingham, Alabama

Personnel
- Head coach: Harry Lander

League / conference affiliations
- American Football Association; Eastern

The Alabama Vulcans were a professional football team which were a part of the American Football Association in 1979. Though the Vulcans used a different color scheme than its predecessors did in the World Football League, the team's name was borrowed from the WFL's Birmingham Vulcans, and its logo was an amalgamation of those of the Vulcans and the Birmingham Americans to draw on the popularity of the previous league's teams. They were owned by Harry Lander, who also served as the team's head coach and the founder of the league. Their home stadium was Legion Field in Birmingham, Alabama. During the one season of the team's existence, it had a record of 13–6, with two five-game winning streaks. The team made the playoffs, but lost in the first round.
