= Harry Usher =

American lawyer (1939–2000)

Harry Lester Usher
- Born: March 6, 1939; Jersey City, New Jersey
- Died: June 22, 2000 (aged 61); Secaucus, New Jersey
- Occupation: Attorney at law
- Known for: 1984 Summer Olympics; United States Football League
- Spouse(s): Jo Usher (divorced); Jane Ellison-Usher
- Children: 6

Harry Lester Usher (March 6, 1939 – June 22, 2000) was an American attorney who was executive vice president and general manager of the committee overseeing business operations for the 1984 Summer Olympics in Los Angeles, and later the second and last commissioner of the United States Football League.

== Early life and education ==
Usher was born on March 6, 1939, in Jersey City, New Jersey. His father died shortly after his birth. He entered Brown University on a scholarship, and his mother also died soon after. At Brown he played football and baseball, and graduated as a Phi Beta Kappa in 1961. He then matriculated at Stanford Law School, where he was editor of the law review and earned his law degree in 1964.

== Career ==
Usher practiced law in California, initially at Gibson, Dunn & Crutcher in Los Angeles and then as a partner in a Beverly Hills firm. He specialized in entertainment law and was president of the Beverly Hills Bar Association when he was made executive vice president and general manager of the Los Angeles Olympic Organizing Committee, which oversaw the business operations of the 1984 Summer Olympics, second in command to Peter Ueberroth, a former client. Usher exerted strict financial control, requiring all expenditures of $1,000 or more to be submitted for his approval; the event generated a surplus of more than $200 million.

On January 15, 1985, he was named the commissioner of the United States Football League (USFL), succeeding Chet Simmons who had resigned the previous day. He signed a three-year contract. The league continued to incur heavy financial losses. ESPN had renewed its network television deal for three years, but ABC, knowing that the USFL was moving to an autumn schedule in 1986 in direct competition with the more-established NFL, decided to televise games for only the 1985 season. He brought a successful antitrust lawsuit against the NFL, but the USFL was awarded only $3 in damages and soon folded.

Usher subsequently worked in executive search and corporate consulting; and at the time of his death headed Proteam.com, an Internet sports company. He was a director of the Amateur Athletic Foundation, now the LA84 Foundation, which was created to disburse California's portion of the surplus from the Los Angeles Olympics and which he was instrumental in making permanent. He was also executive director of the Association of Volleyball Professionals, and was a Brown trustee for six years and helped many California-based students to attend the university.

== Personal life and death ==
Usher was married twice, to Jo Usher, with whom he had four children, and to Jane Ellison-Usher, with whom he had two children.

Usher had open-heart surgery in 1975 when he was only 36. He underwent a second heart bypass at St. John's Hospital and Health Center in Santa Monica on January 9, 1986; he had checked into the hospital complaining of chest pains twenty days earlier on December 20, 1985. On June 22, 2000, at age 61, he was found in a workout room at the AmeriSuites Hotel in Secaucus, New Jersey after an apparent heart attack and confirmed dead at a hospital; he was on a consulting mission for General Electric Financial Services.
