= American Football Association (1977–1983) =

Former American football minor league

The American Football Association (AFA) was a professional American football minor league that operated from 1977 to 1983.

The AFA was concentrated in the southern United States and served as the second tier of professional football between the World Football League, which folded in 1975, and the United States Football League, which began play in 1983. Unlike the WFL or USFL, the AFA always fashioned itself as a minor league, and never planned to rival the National Football League for "major league" status. Players were paid one percent of gross gate revenue, which often meant players were paid only menial sums for their service (often comparable to minimum wage for three hours of work), and the league struggled to acquire recognizable players.

The league played its games on Saturday nights in the summer (beginning its season Memorial Day weekend and ending in August) to avoid direct competition against other football in the fall, a move that foreshadowed the USFL's similar spring football schedule. The AFA ended operations in 1983, unable to take advantage of the strike that hit the NFL the year prior or weather the competition from the USFL.

== Teams and cities represented ==
State	City	Team(s)
Oklahoma	Tulsa	Oklahoma Thunder
Oklahoma	Tulsa	Tulsa Mustangs
Alabama	Birmingham	Alabama Vulcans
Alabama	Birmingham	Alabama Magic
Kentucky	Louisville	Kentucky Trackers
Florida	Jacksonville	Jacksonville Firebirds
Florida	Jacksonville	Jacksonville Sunbirds
Florida	Orlando	Orlando Americans
North Carolina	Charlotte	Carolina Chargers (Note: Also known as the Carolina Storm. The Chargers/Storm were by far the most successful club in AFA history, playing in four of the league's six championship games (losing in 1979 and 1980, winning in 1982 and 1983; Charlotte was also undefeated in the latter two years).)
Texas	San Antonio	San Antonio Charros
Texas	Austin	Austin Texans
Texas	Dallas	Dallas Wranglers
Texas	Burleson	Fort Worth Wranglers
Texas	Houston	Houston Hotshots
Texas	Houston	Houston Armadillos
Arkansas	Little Rock	Arkansas Diamonds
Mississippi	Jackson	Mississippi Stars
Virginia	Norfolk	Virginia Hunters
Louisiana	Shreveport	Shreveport Steamer (Note: Later merged with Orlando as the "Shreveport Americans".)
West Virginia	Charleston	West Virginia Rockets (Note: 1980 and 1981 champions.)
Illinois	Chicago (Note: the AFA's largest market, and the only one in the northern US.)	Chicago Fire (Note: Not to be confused with the WFL team, or the current MLS franchise.)

Many nicknames came from previous leagues, with minor alterations to avoid trademark disputes: the Steamer, Vulcans and Fire all took their names from WFL teams, while the Rockets borrowed their moniker from a Continental Football League and United Football League team of the same name.

The operations were often fly-by-night, with most teams lasting only one season (or less) before folding, and players played for a paycheck equal to one percent of the net gate receipts after expenses (In August 1980, Shreveport Times sports reporter Ron Higgins estimated the average Steamer game check to be about $35 per man).

Despite its minor-league status, the league's teams often were able to secure leases for unusually large stadiums, often those used by the WFL and the USFL: the Orlando Americans, in their lone season, played in the 70,000-seat Citrus Bowl, while the Vulcans and Magic played at similarly-sized Legion Field, Houston played at 73,000 seat Rice Stadium, and the Fire played at Soldier Field. The Mustangs played at 30,000-seat Skelly Stadium. The Jacksonville Firebirds played in the Gator Bowl.

== History ==
The AFA was founded in May 1977 and began to play that summer. It was formed to take advantage of the places where the WFL was the most popular, while avoiding the overspending that led to that league's demise.

Billy Kilmer, the former NFL quarterback (and coach of the AFA's Shreveport Steamer in 1979), was named commissioner in 1981. Kilmer lasted one season as commissioner, working unpaid, during which he encountered numerous problems in the AFA, including a scandal in San Antonio which a player named Robert Lee Johnson misrepresented himself as former NFL offensive lineman Randy Johnson. The Carolina Chargers, one of the league's more successful and stable teams, dropped out of the league mid-season but re-emerged in 1982 under new ownership as the Carolina Storm.

In 1982, with former San Antonio Wings executive Roger Gill at the helm, the league attempted to expand northward by absorbing other semi-pro teams in Buffalo, New York, Racine, Wisconsin and Canton, Ohio.

The USFL's securing of a TV contract, especially after the AFA had failed to do so (the AFA was only able to get a few of its teams onto local cable stations, still a nascent technology at the time), led to the AFA eventually declining into semi-pro status and folding after its 1983 season.

The AFA lasted six seasons, one of the longest runs of a minor professional football organization in the sport's history, and considered the strongest league in the era between the WFL and the USFL. The development of arena football and its numerous imitators has effectively reduced most outdoor leagues to amateur or semi-pro status, with some exceptions, until the modern era of professional spring football began in 2019 with the Alliance of American Football and subsequently the component leagues that would form the United Football League of 2024.

The modern American Football Association, a sanctioning body for semi-pro and amateur football, is unrelated to the former AFA.

=== 1977 ===
Harry Lander and Roger Gill, from the existing San Antonio Charros amateur club, decided to create a new minor league football league and attract local investors. Five other clubs from Houston, Fort Worth, Austin, Wichita Falls, and Oklahoma City joined the Charros to establish the AFA.

The plan was to play two exhibition games, and then each team would play twelve regular-season games beginning on July 2. The players were promised 1% of each game's gate receipts.

After three games (including two preseason) where they failed to score any points, the Fort Worth Stars were forced out of the league, while the Houston franchise—which had failed to secure a home stadium, pay their league dues, or secure medical insurance for their players—folded mid-August.

Team	W	L	T	Pct.	PF	PA	Notes
San Antonio Charros	8	0	0	1.000	329	81	Champions
Oklahoma City Warriors	4	3	0	.571	192	73	
Austin Texans	4	4	0	.500	168	177	
Wichita Falls Steelers	2	5	0	.285	74	162	
Houston Seagulls	0	5	0	.000	38	183	Folded mid-season
Fort Worth Stars	0	1	0	-	0	77	Forced out of the league

The San Antonio Charros finished undefeated in the regular season and were declared league champions.

=== 1978 ===
The AFA entered an agreement for a loose affiliation with the California Football League for the 1978 season, that both leagues will play their normal league schedules, and at the end of the season the champions of each league will play in the "King Kong Bowl" to determine the "national champion".

Team	W	L	T	Pct.	PF	PA
Shreveport Steamer	9	1	0	.900	375	161
San Antonio Charros	6	4	0	.600	235	185
Houston Titans	6	4	0	.600	226	206
Oklahoma City Stampede	6	4	0	.600	263	185
Wichita Falls Roughnecks	2	8	0	.200	101	300
Austin Texans	1	9	0	.100	158	273

==== Playoffs ====
Semi-finals; September 2
1	Shreveport	14
4	Oklahoma City	0
2	San Antonio	25
3	Houston	7

American Bowl I September 16
1	Shreveport	17*
2	San Antonio	14

^{*} Indicates overtime victory.

King Kong Bowl
(September 30 at State Fair Stadium)
San Jose Tigers 32 vs. Shreveport Steamer 6

=== 1979 ===
The league grow to nine teams and had plans to divide to Eastern and Western divisions, but after Tulsa Mustangs folded the remaining teams has gone from two divisions format to one, with the top four teams making the playoffs.

Team	W	L	T	Pct.	PF	PA
Alabama Vulcans	13	5	0	.722	406	220
San Antonio Charros	10	4	0	.714	405	301
Carolina Chargers	12	5	0	.705	457	277
Jacksonville Firebirds	11	5	0	.687	497	277
Shreveport Steamer	9	7	0	.562	387	279
Mississippi Stars	5	11	0	.312	220	386
Kentucky Trackers	4	12	0	.250	342	544
Tulsa Mustangs	1	4	0	.250	39	120
Arkansas Champs	2	14	0	.125	138	503

==== Playoffs ====
Semi-finals; September 15
1	Alabama	21
4	Jacksonville	28
2	San Antonio	21
3	Carolina	28

American Bowl II; September 29
4	Jacksonville	27
3	Carolina	7

=== 1980 ===
The AFA started the season with eight teams and split up to Eastern and Western divisions. The league revoked Kentucky Trackers license after several cases of misconduct with four remaining weeks in the regular season. The Trackers' remaining games was filled with semi-pro teams from the Atlantic Coast League and the Dixie League, but those games did not count in AFA standings.

Eastern Division
Team	W	L	T	Pct.	PF	PA
Carolina Chargers	10	3	0	.769	315	231
West Virginia Rockets	9	4	0	.692	294	183
Jacksonville Firebirds	8	5	0	.615	306	225
Kentucky Trackers	0	13	0	.000	135	248
Western Division
Team	W	L	T	Pct.	PF	PA
Shreveport Steamer	9	1	0	.900	265	122
San Antonio Charros	6	4	0	.600	227	179
Austin Texans	4	6	0	.400	189	245
Fort Worth Wranglers	0	10	0	.000	85	307

==== Playoffs ====
Semi-finals; August 30
1	Carolina	36
4	San Antonio	20
2	Shreveport	17
3	West Virginia	21

American Bowl III; September 7
1	Carolina	18
3	West Virginia	42

=== 1981 ===
Billy Kilmer was introduced as the first full-time commissioner of the American Football Association. Also, for the first time, the league expended behind southern United States, when they add the Chicago Fire.The Chargers players voted to walk out on the team four games into the season, while both Shreveport Steamer and Austin Texans folded before season end, resulting in Kilmer resignation before the American Bowl. He was replaced by AFA president Roger Gill.

During the season a member of the Orlando Americans admits he impersonated former NFL guard Randy Johnson to make the team. He was discovered when he couldn't crack the starting lineup.

Eastern Division
Team	W	L	T	Pct.	PF	PA
West Virginia Rockets	11	1	0	.916	307	144
Jacksonville Firebirds	8	4	0	.666	228	206
Virginia Hunters	7	5	0	.583	187	210
Orlando Americans	5	7	0	.416	229	202
Carolina Chargers	2	10	0	.166	102	117
Western Division
Team	W	L	T	Pct.	PF	PA
Chicago Fire	8	4	0	.666	311	223
San Antonio Charros	6	6	0	.500	276	297
Shreveport Steamer	6	6	0	.500	169	182
Texas Wranglers	5	7	0	.416	149	237
Austin Texans	2	10	0	.166	184	324

^{*} Includes forfeit games.

==== Playoffs ====
Semi-finals; August 23
1	West Virginia	42
4	San Antonio	12
2	Chicago	24
3	Jacksonville	17

American Bowl IV; August 30
1	West Virginia	29
2	Chicago	21

=== 1982 ===
The AFA expanded to 18 teams, and split up to three divisions, while two teams (Florida Sun and Roanoke Valley Express) folded mid-season.

Southeastern Division
Team	W	L	T	Pct.	PF	PA
Carolina Storm	10	0	0	1.000	339	89
Georgia Pride	6	4	0	.600	178	179
Alabama Magic	6	4	0	.600	209	138
Tallahassee Statesmen	5	5	0	.500	120	178
Jacksonville Sunbirds	3	7	0	.300	136	225
Florida Sun*	0	10	0	.000	7	141
Southwestern Division
Team	W	L	T	Pct.	PF	PA
Shreveport Americans	8	2	0	.800	291	124
Oklahoma Thunder	8	2	0	.800	308	125
Texas Wranglers	8	2	0	.800	291	124
San Antonio Bulls	4	6	0	.400	203	195
Houston Armadillos	2	8	0	.200	54	308
Austin Texans	0	10	0	.000	113	345
Northern Division
Team	W	L	T	Pct.	PF	PA
Racine Gladiators	10	0	0	1.000	309	88
West Virginia Rockets	7	3	0	.700	363	121
Akron Bulldogs	6	4	0	.600	229	98
Roanoke Valley Express*	3	7	0	.300	63	106
Buffalo Geminis	3	7	0	.300	93	294
Virginia Chargers	1	9	0	.100	27	410

^{*} Includes forfeit games.

==== Playoffs ====
First Round (August 7):
Racine 44 vs. Akron 6
Carolina 61 vs. West Virginia 18
Texas 17 vs. Oklahoma 14
Shreveport 42 vs. Georgia 35

Semi-finals; August 15
Carolina	35
Racine	8
Shreveport	30
Texas	27

American Bowl V August 21
Carolina	46
Shreveport	22

=== 1983 ===
It was the seventh and final year of the AFA. The United Football Teams of America league champion – Oklahoma City Drillers – joined the league but later announced that they would play the season as a travelling team before folding altogether after two weeks. Among the Drillers' players was defensive lineman Toby Covel, an unemployed oil worker who remarked of his experience that "semi-pro means semi-pay" and, after the teams' closure, turned to his side job as a country musician, which would earn him fame under the name Toby Keith. The majority of the teams followed, and the league decided that division champions Carolina and San Antonio would meet in the final American Bowl.

The Bulls knew before season's end that they would join the United States Football League as an expansion team for the 1984 season, where they played as the San Antonio Gunslingers (as the Jacksonville Bulls had already claimed rights to the "Bulls" name).

Eastern Division
Team	W	L	T	Pct.	PF	PA
Carolina Storm	6	0	0	1.000	289	44
Canton Bulldogs	4	1	0	.800	87	77
Charleston Rockets	1	3	0	.250	108	81
Pittsburgh Colts	1	5	0	.166	80	236
Western Division
Team	W	L	T	Pct.	PF	PA
San Antonio Bulls	6	1	0	.857	276	58
Shreveport Americans	5	2	0	.714	237	113
Baton Rouge Red Wings	2	3	0	.400	43	224
Dallas Wranglers	2	4	0	.333	115	137
Houston Mustangs	0	4	0	.000	45	159
Oklahoma City Drillers	0	2	0	.000	7	96

==== Playoffs ====
Semi-finals
Carolina
Canceled
San Antonio
Canceled

American Bowl VI; July 23
Carolina	39
San Antonio	0
